= Devana =

Western Slavic goddess

- Goddess of the hunt, wild animals, forests
- Other names: Zevana, Dziewanna
- Weapon: Bow and arrows
- Animals: Sighthounds

Equivalents
- Roman: Diana

Devana (Polish: Dziewanna [d͡ʑɛˈvan.na], Latin: Dzewana), Zevana (Polish: Ziewanna), less often Zievonia (Polish: Ziewonia, Zewonia) is the goddess of wild nature, forests, hunting and the moon worshiped by the Western Slavs.

She was first mentioned in the 15th century by Jan Długosz, who compared her to the Roman goddess Diana. Dziewanna is also a Polish name for Verbascum, the etymology of the word is unclear. After strong criticism from Aleksander Brückner, researchers rejected her authenticity, but nowadays it is accepted by an increasing number of researchers. Sometimes, in folk rituals, she performs together with Morana.

== Etymology ==
Proto-Slavic name for Verbascum is reconstructed as *divizna (cf. Polish: dziwizna, Czech and Slovak: divizna, Serbo-Croatian: дивѝзма, divìzma), with secondary form as *divina (cf. Polish: dziewanna, Ukrainian: дивина́, romanized: dyvyná). That word has a Proto-Balto-Slavic origin and appears in Lithuanian language as e.g. devynspė͂kė, devynjėgė. The only cognate from outside the Balto-Slavic group may be Dacian word διέσεμα/diésema (Dioscorides), which is being derived from *diu̯es-eu̯smn („burning sky”) and compared to German Himmelbrand (Verbascum; „burning heavens”), but exact etymology of Slavic word is unclear. Russian linguist and etymologist Aleksandr Anikin notes a similarity between the Lithuanian terms for Verbascum and the Lithuanian word devynì "nine".

There are several interpretations of Devana's name. The most obvious etymology are words such as dziewa, dziewka, "girl, young woman, maiden", and dziewica, "virgin", a word derived from the dziewa.

Another word, from which the name of the goddess may come from, may be the old Polish dziwy, "wild".

It was also proposed to combine Devana's name with the Proto-Indo-European god of heaven *Dyēus. Slavic folklore includes demons with a similar name, e.g. Polish and Czech dziwożona, Russian div, Bulgarian and Croatian samodiva ("rusalka, boginka, the magical creature"), etc. It is assumed that the feminine demons-divas derive from the Proto-Slavic word *diva, and this word is the feminine form of the word *divъ ("div (demon)"). *divъ is derived from the PIE. word *Dyēus ("god of heaven") through the intermediate *deywós ("heavenly") and its closest related word is Dievs – god of heaven in Baltic mythology. *Dyēus in the Slavs has acquired demonic characteristics as a result of cultural contacts with Iranian peoples, who have demonized the Iranian continuator of *Dyēus as a result of the Zoroastrianist reform. Anikin notes that Verbascum has sometimes been used to lighten hair, and combines the word with PIE. the root *dei-u̯- or *dī- ("to shine, to be bright"), from which also comes *Dyēus.

The suffix -ana, -anna, which occurs in the names of many goddesses, may be derived from the PIE. word *ansu meaning "lord, ruler, god".

== Sources ==
The first source to mention Devana is the Czech Mater Verborum - a Latin dictionary dating back to the 13th century. The text of the dictionary can be read: "Diana, Latonae et Iouis branch" ("Diana, daughter of Jupiter and Latona") and a Czech gloss: "Devana, Letuicina and Perunova dci" ("Devana, daughter of Letuna and Perun"). However, Mater Verborum was discovered in the 19th century by Václav Hanka, who was proved to have falsified texts on Czech history, making this source unreliable.

The main source about Devana is Jan Długosz's Annales:

And since the Lechitic state happened to be founded in an area containing vast forests and groves that the ancient people believed to be inhabited by Diana and that Diana claimed power over them, Cerera, on the other hand, was considered the mother and goddess of the harvests the country needed, [therefore] these two goddesses: Diana in their language called Dziewanna and Cerera called Marzanna enjoyed a special cult and devotion.

— Jan Długosz, Annals or Chronicles of the Famous Kingdom of Poland, 1455.

In another place he writes that when Mieszko ordered the drowning of the idols of pagan gods, "this destruction and drowning of the idols is still present and renewed in some Polish villages, where they carry the images of Devana and Morena on a long stick and throw them into the swamps and sink on Laetare Sunday". However, the information of Długosz that the custom of drowning Death is a legacy of the destruction of Slavic idols by Christians is false, because this custom is already condemned in the Provincial statutes in short, which were written before Długosz's Annales (1420s). In the Chronicle of Poland a similar custom is described by Marcin Bielski:

It was still in my memory that on White Sunday they drowned an idol, one, having dressed a sheaf of hemp or straw in human clothing, which was shown around the whole village, at the nearest lake or puddle, after removing his clothes, they threw it into the water, singing mournfully: Death twists at the fence, let us seek trouble; then they would run home from that place as soon as possible, whoever fell then had this prophecy that he would die that year. They called this idol Marzana, I would say it's the god Mars, Ziewanna as Diana.

— Marcin Bielski, Chronicle of Poland, 1597.

In Poland, the goddess is also mentioned by Maciej Stryjkowski: "Diana, the goddess of hunting, was called by the Sarmatians Zievonia or Devana in their language", "Christ, you enlightened Mieszko who was born blind, and you brought Poland to your baptism. Grom, Ladon, Morana, Pogvizd, Zevana gave up to you". Devana is also mentioned by Miechowita, Guagnini, Kromer and priest Wujek.

Aside from Długosz, this goddess is mentioned by Oskar Kolberg in his work on Lusatia: „Dživica, goddess of forests and hunting, peculiarly in southern Sorbs. This beautiful woman with a bow and arrow has greyhounds. They also talk about someone who stayed in the forest at noon: Hladaj so, zo dživica k tebi ńepřindže. They think that she is hunting also by moonlight. Džiwi [means here] wild, and dživina [means] wildmeat.”

Devana can also be confirmed by toponymy, e.g. the Děvín peak in the Pavlovské Hills, Devínska Nová Ves, or Devin – a Slavic name for Magdeburg and others.

The only potential, non-Western Slavic source is Sermon by Saint Gregory, which lists the figure of Diva alongside other gods such as Mokosh and Perun. Diva passed from Old Russian to Czech and was considered by Josef Jungmann to be another name of the goddess Lada.

== Folklore ==
Devana, apart from the sources mentioned above, does not appear directly in folklore, but some legends may point to her. Devana may be indicated by the legend of Łysa Góra, which was presented as "Polish Olympus" in Polish culture. According to local legends, before the monastery was built there, on Łysa Góra in pre-Christian times stood a gord (Wielkopolska Chronicle) or a castle (Długosz). According to Długosz, the castle was to be built by giants, and in the folk version by the "Proud Lady", which was her seat. The Proud Lady, who was to defeat Alexander the Great, fell into pride and declared herself Diana. God did not bear it and destroyed the castle with lightning. Marek Derwich and Marek Cetwiński interpret The "Proud Lady" as Devana.

Later on, Devana is mentioned by the Scottish folklorist James G. Frazer in his The Golden Bough, who describes a Silesian custom where the figure of Death (Marzanna) is melted or destroyed. Then, the young people go to the forest, cut down a small fir, strip away the bark and then decorate it with festoons, paper roses, pisanki, etc. The tree is called May or Summer. Then the boys walk with this tree from house to house and sing songs:

We've already brought Death out of the village -
We are bringing a new Summer
We bow to the May days
And colorful flowers

Polish text

Wynieśliśmy już z wioski Śmierć –
Niesiemy nowe Lato
Kłaniamy się majowym dniom
I kolorowym kwiatom

Frazer continues: "Sometimes they also bring from the forest a nicely assumed doll, which they call Summer, May or Fiancée. In Poland they call her the Devana, the goddess of spring". A similar practice is described by Marcin Kromer in De origine et rebus gestis Polonorum libri XXX. In Podlasie region, the Princess, a beautiful girl dressed in colorful robes, flowers and red beads was shown around, which may be related to the Silesian custom.

In Slavic folklore there are devony (Polish: dziewonie) – female mountain spirits or demons living in the caves, engaged in spinning, related to the forest fleece, who may be a demonized Devana. It can be similar with dziwożony.

=== Herb ===
in Polish, dziewanna (less often dziwizna) is also the name for verbascum, used for skin care and treatment of respiratory problems. Szyjewski notes, however, that the dziewanna was sometimes called the braid of the Virgin Mary, and Kolankiewicz that in medieval iconography the Blessed Virgin Mary was sometimes depicted with the verbascum in her hand, and marzanna (name for six plants), was also a synonym for the dziewanna in the 16th century.

== Interpretations ==
The first studies on the "pantheon of Długosz" denied the existence of all or most of the gods he mentioned. The main critics were Aleksander Brückner and Stanisław Urbańczyk. After rejecting the hypercritical approach to "pantheon of Długosz" many researchers, such as Aleksander Gieysztor, Andrzej Szyjewski, Vyacheslav Ivanov and Vladimir Toporov, have been inclined to acknowledge the authenticity of at least some "Polish gods", including Devana.

=== Double goddess ===
Due to the multiple appearances of the pair Devana and Morana in the spring ceremonies, some researchers have suggested that both of these goddesses could be the two faces of one goddess of life and death. A similar motif occurs in Indo-European religions, e.g. the Scandinavian Hel ("one half of her face had a handsome and pleasant expression, the other half dead and hideous") or the Greek couple Persephone-Kora, who spent half a year underground and half a year on earth. According to Kolankiewicz, double goddess may be indicated by alleged connection of Devana with Proto-Slavic *diva ("female spirit, boginka") and Iranian deva ("demon"). The archaic nature of Devana and Morana may be indicated by a connection to vegetation, and that connects them to Mother Earth.

== In Christianity ==
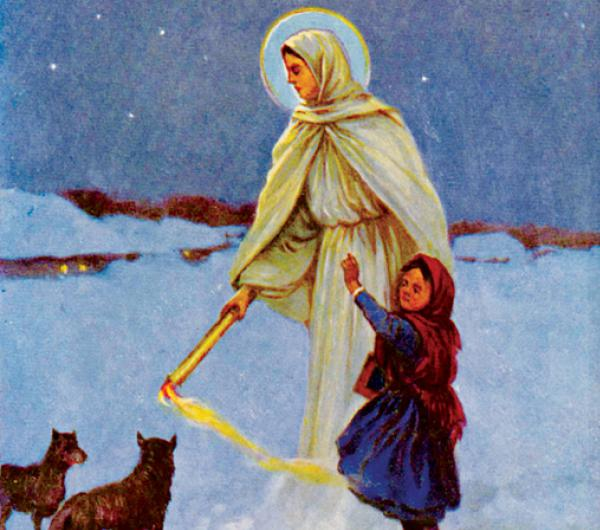
Our Lady of Thunder Candle.

During the Christianization, Devana could have been replaced by Our Lady of Thunder Candle (Polish: Matka Boża Gromniczna). Polish legend says that she walks on February nights and protects fields from freezing. The iconography depicts her with the wolf (or wolves) she protected from death from the peasants, and whom she made her servant, with a basket or a nest of larks at her feet, whose squeal was to herald the imminent coming of spring. In her hands, she always holds a "thunder candle" (Polish: gromnica, from grom "thunder"), which was used for fortune-telling, protect the house from wolves, lightning or evil, and used to burn the hair of children to protect them from ear disease. Thunder candle often occurs in sayings about the coming of spring. In the past, thunder candle wicks were made of verbascum and sometimes was named knotnica (from knot "wick"), royal candle or braid of the Virgin Mary. Connecting the feast of Our Lady of Thunder Candle (Candlemas) with wild animals appears in other Slavic countries.

== Legacy ==
- 471143 Dziewanna – asteroid named after goddess
- Halina Poświatowska – W słońcu południa
- Małgorzata Hillar – Ballada o dziewannie
- Bronisława Ostrowska – Dziewanna

== Bibliography ==
- Gieysztor, Aleksander (2006). Mitologia Słowian. Warszawa: Wydawnictwa Uniwersytetu Warszawskiego. ISBN 978-83-235-0234-0.
- Szyjewski, Andrzej (2003). Religia Słowian. Kraków: Wydawnictwo WAM. ISBN 83-7318-205-5.
- Gloger, Zygmunt (1903). Encyklopedja staropolska ilustrowana. Vol. IV. P. Laskauer, W. Babicki.
- Kolankiewicz, Leszek (1999). Dziady. Teatr święta zmarłych. Gdańsk: Słowo/Obraz Terytoria. ISBN 8387316393.
- Niedzielski, Grzegorz (2011). Królowie z gwiazd. Mitologia plemion prapolskich. Sandomierz: Armoryka. ISBN 978-83-7950-077-2.
- Urzędów, Marcin (1595). Herbarz Polski to jest o przyrodzeniu ziół i drzew rozmaitych i inszych rzeczy do lekarstw należących księgi dwoje. Kraków: Drukarnia Łazarzowa.
- Cieśla, Joanna (1991). Wielka księga ziół. Warszawa: Wiedza i Życie. ISBN 8385231242.
- Derwich, Marek (2004). Od Gigantów po Aleksandra Macedońskiego. Obraz historii w relacjach o początkach Łysej Góry i klasztoru łysogórskiego (XIV-XVIII w.). Staropolski ogląd świata. Wrocław: Drukarnia Łazarzowa. pp. 57–63.
- Derwich, Marek; Cetwiński, Marek (1987). Herby, legendy, dawne mity. Wrocław: Krajowa Agencja Wydawnicza. ISBN 8303018094.
- Kurek, Jagoda (2020). "Dziewanna – ognisty aspekt archetypu dzikiej kobiety". Gniazdo - Rodzima Wiara I Kultura. 1/(20). FNCE.
- Kolberg, Oskar (1985). "Przekłady fragmentów Pjesnicěk J. E. Smolerja". Lud. Jego zwyczaje, sposób życia, mowa, podania, przysłowia, obrzędy, gusła, zabawy, pieśni, muzyka i tańce. Vol. 59, cz. I, Łużyce. Wrocław: Krajowa Agencja Wydawnicza. ISBN 8300000658.
- Brückner, Aleksander (1985). Mitologia słowiańska. Warszawa: Państwowe Wydawnictwo Naukowe. ISBN 8301062452.
- Anikin, Aleksandr (2019). "дивена". Русский этимологический словарь. Vol. 13. Moskwa: Nestor-Istorija. ISBN 978-5-88744-087-3.
- Brodský, Pavel (2012). "Rukopis mater verborum jako problém paleografický, kodikologický i uměleckohistorický". Historia Slavorum Occidentis. 2 (1): 1–2. doi:10.15804/hso120110. ISSN 2084-1213.
