= Dzidzilela =

Alleged Polish goddess

Dzidzilela, Dzidzileyla, Dzidzilelya (Note: Latin: Dzydzileyla Polish: Dzidzilela, Dzidzilejla, Dzidzilelja) is an alleged Polish goddess. First mentioned by Jan Długosz as the Polish equivalent of the Roman goddess Venus, goddess of marriage. Nowadays, the authenticity of the goddess is rejected by most researchers, and it is believed that the theonym was created by recognizing a fragment of folk songs as a proper name.

== Source ==
Dzidzilela first appears in the Annals of Jan Długosz, who compared her to Venus, the Roman goddess of love:

Venus they called Dzydzilelya, and, believing her to be the goddess of marriage, they prayed to her for fertile descendance and an abundance of sons and daughters.

— Jan Długosz, Annals or Chronicles of the Famous Kingdom of Poland, 1455

After Dlugosz the information about Dzidzilela was repeated by Maciej Miechowita, Marcin Kromer, Alexander Guagnini, Maciej Stryjkowski, Marcin and Joachim Bielski, and the priest Jakub Wujek in the following variations: Dzidzilia, Zizilia, Zyzylia, Zezylia.

== Historicity ==
The authenticity of Dzidzilela, like that of other deities mentioned by Długosz, was initially not questioned. This situation changed when Aleksander Brückner criticised the sources about the goddess. Originally, he acknowledged the historicity of the goddess, reading her name as Dziecilela, which was supposed to mean "the one who lull, rock the children" (from Old Polish lelać "to lull, rock", Polish dzieci "children"), rejecting the role of the goddess of love ascribed to her by Długosz. A few years later he pointed out the similarity with the word dziedziły "dziady". Ultimately, however, he rejected the authenticity of the goddess, arguing that Długosz's original record does not support such an interpretation, and considering dziedziły to be a contemporary invention. He concluded that Dzidzilela derives from the refrains of folk songs; however, he did not know how to interpret the first segment, dzidzi – he pointed out that just as the words vyelom or lelom appear before the fragment of the refrain lado (see: Lada), dzidzi, or something similar, could have appeared too. In the case of the second segment, -ilelya, he believed that it could have derived from the alleged theonym Ileli (Latin: Yleli, Ylely) (Note: Statua provincialia breviter (1420): Also forbid clapping and chanting, in which the names of the idols Lado, Yleli, Yassa, and Tya are invoked, and which are held during Green Week. Sermones per circulum anni Cunradi (1423): Unfortunately, our old men, old women, and girls do not apply themselves to prayers, so that they would be worthy to receive the Holy Spirit, but unfortunately, during these three days, which should be spent in meditation, old men, women, and girls come together, not to church, not for prayers, but for dances, not to call upon God, but upon the devil, namely, Ysaya, Lado, Ylely, Yaya.) mentioned in church sermons. A similar opinion was held by Henryk Łowmiański.

In the case of the analysis of Długosz's manuscript record (Dzydzilelya), the reconstruction of Dziecilela proposed by Brückner, which he eventually abandoned, was an arbitrary reading of dz as Polish ⟨c⟩ and y as Slavic ⟨ě⟩.

According to Zorian Dolęga-Chodakowski, this theonym originated from a phrase like "oj, didi Lelo". A similar conclusion was reached independently by Anatoliy Zhuravlov, who reconstructed *did(i) lel(e) as a song formula, similar to *dedъ lada found in East Slavic calendar and ritual songs. This reconstruction is supported by East and South Slavic formulas, e.g.: Serbo-Croatian "Kraļu! Lelo!", "Pero, lelo!", "Lele mužu", "Jelo le!", "lelja le", Bulgarian "Tatko-le", "Lubo-le", "Vily-le", "Goro-le", Russian "Lele didu", "lele babo", etc., whose structure consists of name (vocative singular) + *le or *lele/*lelo.

In the fragments of East Slavic folk songs, there often appears the unintelligible word did-, e.g.: Ukrainian "Oy, didi Lelo", "Did i Did i Lado", "Oy Did, Did i Łado", or Russian, "Oy Did i Lado", "Dido kalina! Lela malina", which has its counterpart in Old Lithuanian didys, Lithuanian dialectic dzidzis, Lithuanian didys, which also occurs in songs, for example: "Oj did, didi...", "Ar i didi...", "Didi divaj buvo", "Didis... Devie!" The word is explainable in a Baltic context, and it is related to the Lithuanian didis "big, great". For this reason, some scholars believed that the word was borrowed from Baltic to East Slavic (e.g. Aleksandr Faminstyn), but the example of the fragment of the Old Slovak song "Didi-Jane", "Didi-Jene" meaning "oh St. John", sung during St. John's Day may indicate a native Slavic origin of the word – the presumed Proto-Slavic *did- "big, great", like its Baltic counterpart, would be a continuation of the Proto-Indo-European *d(e)ih₂-dʰe "to be visible". Thus, it is possible that the first segment of the song formula "name + lelo" contains a Polish continuant of the Proto-Slavic *did-, which may have yielded the song-formula *didi lela or *didi lelo, which was recognized as a proper name by Długosz and later recognized as a deity. According to Michał Łuczyński, this interpretation is the most likely. The recognition of Dzidzilela as a relic of a pagan ritual language, and not as a goddess, was also advocated by Anatoliy Zhuravlov, Vyacheslav Ivanov and Vladimir Toporov, and other scholars.

It is unlikely to be related to the Latinized given name Didislav, which probably renders the Western South Slavic *Didislavъ, and the Old Polish surname Dzidziula, as their transcription may be tainted, e.g., the Slavic ⟨ě⟩ non-standardly transcribed as i, which may be indicated by the Old Slovak given name Dedislav. In the case of the name Didislav, if the transcript is correct, the analysis suggests that the first segment is a imperative from a hypothetical Proto-Slavic verb *diditi of unknown meaning not preserved in any language, which also causes problems, and the etymology of this name may also be explained in other ways.

Reading the name as a name similar to the Old Polish *Lelistryj (12th century) (Note: Polish stryj "uncle".), with the segment being a kinship term, where the first segment derives from the Proto-Slavic *dědъ "grandfather" is also unlikely, because in personal names *dědъ passed into the root *Dědo- or *Dědu-, e.g.: Old Polish Dziadumiła (Note: e → a – lekhitic apophony), Czech Dědomil, Serbo-Croatian Djedomir/Dedomir, Russian *Dedoslavъ. Therefore, form *Dziadolela should be expected, which, however, is not indicated in the record of Długosz. The Old Polish surname Dzidziula (Latin: Dzydzula (1485), Dzidziuła (18th century)), which was connected with the word dziad "grandfather" and surnames with a similar suffix, e.g. Dziadul, Sowul, Szewczul and others, cannot be connected with the theonym because it is a polonized Lithuanian surname (Lithuanian: Dìdelis, Didžiùlis).

In the case of later editions of Długosz's Annals, where records of Dzidziela (Rozrożowski's codex) and Dzidzielia (Dobromił's edition) are found, the theonym may be reconstructed as the Old Polish name *Dzidziela, which would be the feminine equivalent of the masculine name *Dzidziel (consisting of the root Dziad + the suffix -el) with the suffix -ela, cf. with the attested personal name from the 15th century Dzidziula, or be an abbreviation of an unknown full name. However, these editions are later and contain their own variations of theonyms, making them less reliable.

The vast majority of researchers reject the authenticity of the goddess, and many ignore her in their publications; Roman Jakobson, Aleksander Gieysztor among others connected the sound of Dzidzilela to the sound of the South Slavic rainmaking ritual Dodola.

== Bibliography ==
- Kolankiewicz, Leszek (1999). Dziady. Teatr święta zmarłych. Gdańsk: Słowo/Obraz Terytoria. ISBN 8387316393.
- Brückner, Aleksander (1985). Mitologia słowiańska. Warszawa: Państwowe Wydawnictwo Naukowe. ISBN 8301062452.
- Jakobson, Roman (1985). Selected Writings VII: Contributions to Comparative Mythology. Walter de Gruyter. ISBN 9783110106176.
- Gieysztor, Aleksander (2006). Mitologia Słowian. Warszawa: Wydawnictwa Uniwersytetu Warszawskiego. ISBN 978-83-235-0234-0.
- Szyjewski, Andrzej (2003). Religia Słowian. Kraków: Wydawnictwo WAM. ISBN 83-7318-205-5.
- Łuczyński, Michał (2020). Bogowie dawnych Słowian. Studium onomastyczne. Kielce: Kieleckie Towarzystwo Naukowe. ISBN 978-83-60777-83-1.
- Faminstyn, Aleksandr (1884). Божества древних славян (in Russian) (1 ed.). Saint Petersburg: Тип. Э. Арнгольда.
- Łowmiański, Henryk (1979). Religia Słowian i jej upadek, w. VI-XII. Warszawa: Państwowe Wydawnictwo Naukowe. ISBN 83-01-00033-3.
- Ivanov, Vyacheslav; Toporov, Vladimir (1980). "Славянская мифология". In Tokarev, Sergei (ed.). Мифы народов мира: Энциклопедия (in Russian). Vol. 2. Moscow: Большая российская энциклопедия. pp. 450–456.
- Alvarez-Pedroza, Juan Antonio (2021). Sources of Slavic Pre-Christian Religion. Leiden: Koninklijke Brill. ISBN 978-90-04-44138-5.
