= Lel and Polel =

Polish pagan deities

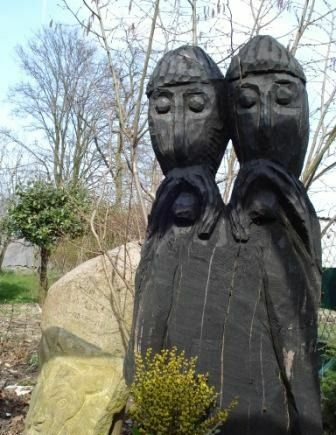
- A copy of the twin statue from the island of Fischerinsel
- Major cult center: Fischerinsel (probably)
- Region: Poland, Veleti (probably)
- Parents: Łada (mother)

Equivalents
- Roman: Castor and Pollux

Lel and Polel (Latin: Leli, Poleli) are Polish divine twins, first mentioned by Maciej Miechowita in the 16th century where he presents them as equivalents of Castor and Pollux and the sons of the goddess Łada, the equivalent of Leda. There is no complete agreement about the authenticity of the cult of Lel and Polel.

== Sources ==
Lel and Polel were first mentioned in the Chronica Polonorum by Maciej Miechowita where he is correcting Jan Długosz who wrote that Łada was Polish equivalent of Roman god of war Mars:

They worship Leda, mother of Castor and Pollux, and twins from one of the eggs born, Castor and Pollux, which is still heard today by singing the most ancient songs of Łada, Łada, Ilela and Leli Poleli with clapping and beating hands. Łada is – as I dare say according to the testimony of the living word – name of Leda, not Mars, Castor [is named] Leli, Poleli [is name of] Pollux

— Maciej Miechowita, Chronica Polonorum, (1519)

Marcin Kromer, Maciej Stryjkowski, Marcin Bielski and his son Joachim also mention the twins. Alessandro Guagnini claimed that the cult of Lel and Polel existed during his lifetime in Greater Poland. The priest Jakub Wujek also mentions "Lelipoleli".

== Research ==
Initially, the authenticity of the gods Lel and Polel was not questioned, as evidenced by their popularity among major Polish writers such as Ignacy Krasicki, Juliusz Słowacki and Stanisław Wyspiański.

Aleksander Brückner, who was one of the first researchers to tackle the topic of the Polish pantheon, categorically rejected the authenticity of Lel and Polel. He believed that the cry Łada, Łada, Ilela and Leli Poleli cited by Miechowita was in fact only a drinking song, an exclamation similar to tere-fere or fistum-pofistum, and the alleged names were derived from the word lelać "to sway". Despite Brückner's significant achievements, many modern researchers accuse him of a hypercritical or even pseudoscientific approach to the subject of the Polish pantheon.

The attitude towards the cult of Lel and Polel changed in 1969 when two cult figures of oak tree dating from the 11th or 12th century were discovered on the island of Fischerinsel on the Tollensesee in Mecklenburg. One of them is 178 cm high and presents two male figures with a moustache, in headgear (helmets?), which are fused with heads and torsos. The second primitive representation, which is 157 cm high, shows a female figure with clearly outlined breasts. Some researchers allege that these idols depict Lel and Polel and their mother Łada.

Following the abandonment of Brückner's hypercritical attitude and the discovery of twin figures on the island of Fischerinsel, modern researchers are more confident about the authenticity of their cult. Against the origin of the names from drinking songs are testified by Karol Potkański the own names Lel and Lal and the Russian song Lelij, Lelij, Lelij zelenyj and my Lado! where the first word may be associated with the dialectal Russian word lelek, which meant a "strong, healthy youth". Voditь leli is a women's pageant to honour young married women that shows the original ritual and mythical connotations, which after several centuries could have become drunken chants. From the 17th century, the term lelum polelum in the sense of "slow, sluggish" was recorded, which may have been the result of desacralization. According to Andrzej Szyjewski, Lelum and Polelum could have been zodiacal twins, (Note: The brightest stars of the Gemini constellation, α Gem and β Gem, are thought to have been originally named Lele and Polele in Belarusian tradition, after the twin characters.) and in the opinion Alexander Gieysztor they brought happiness, which may be reflected in faith in the magical power of a double ear [of grain].

However, according to Grzegorz Niedzielski, Lel and Polel are the invention of Miechowita and the Slavic twin brothers were to be Łada and Leli, where Łada was the fire god and the remains of the divine twins is the legend of Waligóra and Wyrwidąb.

== Lel and Polel in culture ==
=== Literature ===
- Janusz Christa: Kajko and Kokosz ("Lelum polelum" is a favorite saying of Breakbone)
- Ignacy Krasicki: Myszeis. ("Popiel calls, begs Lelum Polelum")
- Juliusz Słowacki: Lilla Weneda. Lelum and Polelum are sons of king of Veneti and they were kidnapped by Lechites.
- Stanisław Wyspiański: Skałka. ("Lel, cause it, my friend")
- Adam Mickiewicz: Pan Tadeusz. ("Castor and his brother Pollux glittered at their head, once called among the Slavs Lele and Polele")
- Władysław Orkan: Drzewiej. Powieść. ("there was Lel, uncle of the god, and Lada or Polel, the son who charged the sword; there was Lelej or Lelek, the keeper of the herds")

=== Music ===
- Lao Che – Lelum Polelum
- Rod – Lelum Polelum (album)
- Sulin – Lelum Polelum

=== Video games ===
- The twin divines appear in the video game Blacktail by Polish developer The Parasight, as standing stones. (touching one transports you to the other)

== Bibliography ==
- Brückner, Aleksander (1985). Mitologia słowiańska. Warszawa: Państwowe Wydawnictwo Naukowe. ISBN 8301062452.
- Gieysztor, Aleksander (2006). Mitologia Słowian. Warszawa: Wydawnictwa Uniwersytetu Warszawskiego. ISBN 83-235-0234-X.
- Szyjewski, Andrzej (2003). Religia Słowian. Kraków: Wydawnictwo WAM. ISBN 83-7318-205-5.
- Kolankiewicz, Leszek (1999). Dziady. Teatr święta zmarłych. Gdańsk: Słowo/Obraz Terytoria. ISBN 8387316393.
- Niedzielski, Grzegorz (2011). Królowie z gwiazd. Mitologia plemion prapolskich. Sandomierz: Armoryka. ISBN 978-83-7950-077-2.
