= Pseudo-mythology =

Improperly sourced or non-historical myths

Pseudo-mythology (Russian: кабинетная мифология or kabinetnaya mifologiya, "office mythology", literally "cabinet mythology") are myths and deities which are not properly attested in traditional mythology and folklore or whose existence is doubtful or disproved. It may be created by researchers who liberally interpret scarce sources.

Pseudo-mythology should not be confused with the term "false mythology" in the derogatory meaning of "false beliefs" or "false/fabricated stories". The term is also not applicable to mythological elements in literary works invented for artistic reasons.

Philosopher Vincent Descombes maintains that "a myth is what is told as a myth and what is transmitted as a myth". Therefore, in his opinion, the correct term would be "poor mythology" or "insipid mythology", rather than "pseudo-mythology".

== Slavic mythology ==
There is a scarcity of reliable sources for the Slavic religion.

A large number of questionable Slavic deities have been described since the 16th century and through the present day.

=== Poland ===
Polish chroniclers of the 16th and 17th centuries such as Jan Długosz, Maciej Miechowita, and Maciej Stryjkowski invented many pseudo-deities based on models from antiquity, including Dzidzilela, Kyi, Lada, Yesha, Pogvizd, and Uslad.

=== Belarus ===
A good deal of nonexistent deities and spirits were invented by Pavel Shpilevsky (also alias P. Drevlyansky) in his writings about Belarusian mythology; in particular, in his work Belarusian Folk Legends (1st part: 1846, 2nd and 3rd: 1852), where he described 52 alleged Belarusian mythological characters, most of them are questioned by modern academia. Despite the fact that his writings were heavily criticized by his contemporaries (e.g., by Alexander Potebnja), they have been treated as a trusted reference work by several generations of researchers. While Shpilevsky did collect Belarusian folklore, he liberally added his own interpretations without drawing distinction from authentic folklore.

== Baltic states ==
=== Lithuania ===
Jan Łasicki in his Concerning the gods of Samagitians, and other Sarmatians and false Christians (De diis Samagitarum caeterorumque Sarmatarum et falsorum Christianorum, written c. 1582 and published in 1615) provides a a list of 78 deities and spirits. However he was criticized already in 19th century, e.g., by Antoni Julian Mierzyński, who also questioned the authenticity of the mythology of Teodor Narbutt, who was popular during the national awakening of Lithuania. Only a few of Łasicki's deities are considered authentic now.

Anapilis is a fictional mountain, allegedly the place of the afterlife in the pagan mythology of ancient Lithuanians. It is independently sourced only to Teodor Narbutt, known to invent hosts of pseudo-pagan deities. Therefore Anapilis/Anafielas is considered pseudo-mythological as well. Still, it is part of the modern Lithuanian culture. Bronys Savukynas wrote: "one of the most frequently used Narbutas’s false names is the name of ancient Lithuanian paradise – Anapilis."

=== Latvia ===
After the abolition of serfdom in Latvia, a new national identity was forming and authors sought to prove that Baltic cultural traditions were as deep as those of other nations. It was hoped that a grand epic could be constructed using pieces preserved in folklore. It was also thought that the ancient religion, forgotten during 700 years of oppression, could be reconstructed. However, folklore sources proved insufficient for the task. Some attempted to reconstruct pantheons to be as impressive as in Greek mythology, which led to some deities being simply invented. Besides the assumption that deities of other Baltic peoples must be Latvian as well but were simply lost over time, many new deities were modeled after Greek and Roman deities. An example of the trend is the epic poem Lāčplēsis by Andrejs Pumpurs, which features a pantheon of Latvian and Prussian gods and some the author has invented himself. Similarly, works of Juris Alunāns and poet Miķelis Krogzemis feature pantheons of invented deities.

=== Estonia ===
Aivar Põldvee writes that the Estonian pantheon started shaping in the 19th century during the period of national awakening. The older sources about ancient Estonian deities are scarce and ambiguous, while the 19th-century research was uncritical. Still, 19th century writings shaped the modern interpretation of Estonian mythology. Therefore, Põldvee writes that the term "pseudo-mythology" is applicable here. In particular, it is traceable how the Estonian god Vanemuine was reconstructed by Estonian intellectuals from Finnish Väinämöinen, whose authenticity (at least the whole mythology around him) has also been questioned.

== Greece ==
Despite Greek Mythology being one of the most documented mythologies on the planet, several figures were added to the pantheon. One of these is Mesperyian the alleged daughter of Hades and Persephone, who was first mentioned in a discussion on which goddess is the most beautiful on Tumblr. With some people refusing to answer because of how the Trojan War started. One user brought up Mesperyian who was said to be more beautiful than that "jealous hoe" Aphrodite who burnt her face off with a poisoned comb. Similar to how Medea killed her rival Glauce or Creusa, with a poisoned dress. The tale continues with Mesperyian donning an iron mask and becoming the goddess of torture and punishment.

== See also ==
- Fakelore
- Demogorgon
- Mythopoeia
- Invented tradition
