= Lada (mythology) =

Alleged goddess in Slavic and Baltic mythology

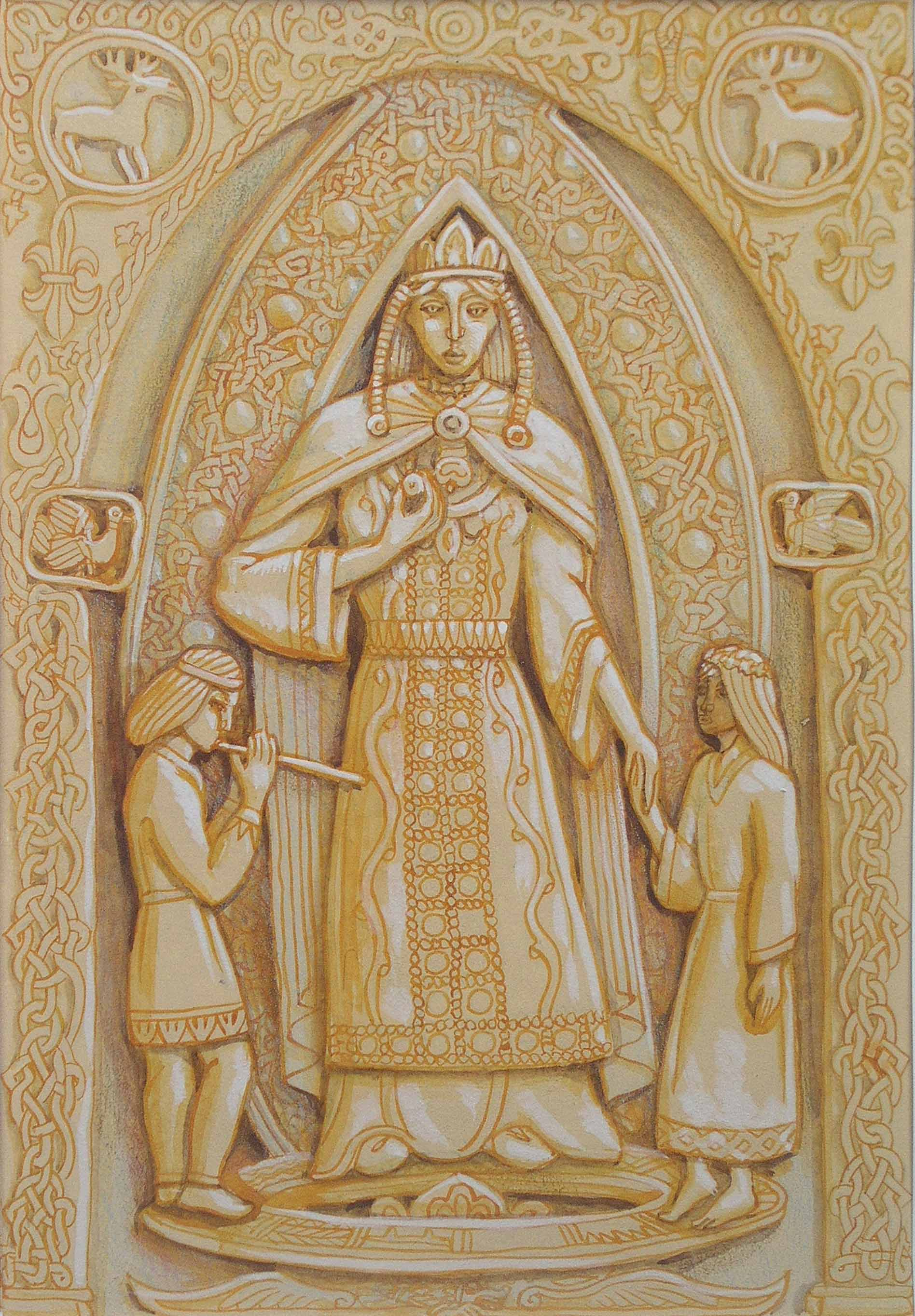
Maximilian Presnyakov: "Lada" ("Slav cycle"), 1998.

Lada (Note: Polish: Łada [ˈwada]; Russian: Лада [ˈladə].) and Lado (Note: Polish: Łado [ˈwadɔ]; Russian: Ладо [ˈladə].) are alleged Slavic deities. Lada was first mentioned around 1405–1412 in the sermons of Lucas of Wielki Koźmin, which warned against worshipping Lada and other gods during spring ceremonies and folk performances.

The deities owe their popularity to Polish priest Jan Długosz, who described Lada as a goddess of war in his works and compared her to the Roman Mars, to Alexander Famitsin, who recognized the name Lada in Russian songs as attributed to the goddess of marriage, and to scholar Boris Rybakov, who insisted on recognizing her historicity. However, the vast majority of religious scholars and Slavists reject the historicity of these deities, believing that they owe their divine status to a misunderstanding of the song refrains by medieval scribes.

According to some scholars of Baltic mythology, Lada was also worshipped by the Balts, but this view is also considered controversial; see the Lada as Baltic goddess section.

Minor planet (2832) Lada was named after her.

== Sources ==
=== Polish ===
The first source mentioning the theonym Lada is the Gniezno Sermons, which were written by Lucas of Wielki Koźmin around 1405-1412, without giving any description:

One should pay attention to those who say ungodly things today in dances or elsewhere in performances, consider unclean things in their hearts, shout out and mention the names of idols, and consider whether conversion to God the Father is possible. Certainly not. For it is forbidden to hear freely these holidays, which unfortunately celebrate according to what was left of the rites of the accursed pagans of our ancestors, unless for punishment, as once the shout of the inhabitants of Sodom and Gomorrah rose. For at this festival indecent exposure and other abominations, which the Apostle says should not even be named because of God the Father. However, due to the fact that preachers have arrived, such things cease, and in many places they have already ceased [...] There is no other name under heaven in which we can be saved. For a man is not saved in the name of Lado, Jassa, !Quia, Nyia, but in the name of Jesus Christ ... Not Lada, not Jassa, not Nija, which are the names of idols worshiped here in Poland, as some chronicles of Poles testify...

— Lucas of Wielki Koźmin, Gniezno Sermons, around 1405-1412

Similar cautions, also without any description, are also found in: Statua provincialia breviter (1420-1422), Sermones per circulum anni Cunradi (1423), Postilla Husitae anonymi, and in glosses of Life of Adalbert of Prague.

The theonyms contained in the Gniezno Sermons were also repeated by Jan Długosz, who made an interpretatio romana and compared Lada to the Roman war god Mars:

Mars they called Lyada, whom the fictions of the poets proclaim the patron and god of war. To him they prayed for victory over their enemies and a fierce heart, and they sought his favour with the cruellest of cults.

— Jan Długosz, Annals or Chronicles of the Famous Kingdom of Poland, 1455

After Długosz the information about Lada was repeated by Maciej Miechowita, Marcin Kromer, Alexander Guagnini, Maciej Stryjkowski, Marcin and Joachim Bielski, and the priest Jakub Wujek. Maciej Miechowita, who copied information from Długosz, did not agree with him, however, on the function of Lada and corrected Długosz's information, comparing her to the Greek Leda and recognising her as the mother of Lel and Polel:

They worship Leda, the mother of Castor and Pollux, and twins born of a single egg, Castor and Pollux, which can be heard even today in the most ancient songs sung by Łada, Łada, Ileli and Leli Poleli with clapping and beating hands. Calling Lada – as I would venture to say according to the testimony of the living word – Leda, not Mars, Castor [is named] Leli, Poleli [is name of] Pollux.

— Maciej Miechowita, Chronica Polonorum, (1519)

Outside the Annals, in Insignia seu clenodia Regis et Regni Poloniae, Długosz also mentions the female deity Lada, worshipped in the village of Łada near the river Łada, from which the Łada family took its name: "Łada took its name from the name of a Polish goddess who was worshipped in Mazovia in the town and village of Łada". She is also mentioned in the Powieść świętokrzyska: "there was a church of three idols, which were called Lada, Boda, Leli, to which the ordinary people went on the first of May to make prayers to them and to offer them.".

=== East Slavic ===
God Lado appears twice in Eastern sources. The first is the Hustyn Chronicle, written in Church Slavonic from the 17th century, with an uncertain exact date of composition and an uncertain author. This source recognizes Lado as the god of marriage and joy, and compares him to the Greek god Bacchus-Dionysus:

The fourth, Lado, was an infernal god; in him they believed that he was the god of weddings, joy and all prosperity, like the Hellenes in Bacchus. Those who were about to get married offered sacrifices to him, so that with his help the marriage would be good and loving. This Lado, the demon, is worshipped in some parts of the world at baptisms and weddings by singing some songs, and clapping hands on the table or on hands, Lado, Lado, interspersed with their songs, they repeat many times.

Similar informations are found in the Kievan Synopsis of 1674 by Innocent Gizel, which mentions Lado as a deity of happiness, to whom offerings were made during wedding preparations. Leli and Poleli, and their mother, were also supposed to be worshipped by singing "lado, lado, lado".

== Historicity ==
=== Sources ===
The only "independent" source mentioning the deity of Lada/Lado are the Gniezno Sermons, and other sources are dependent on them. The theonyms contained therein were then used and popularized by Jan Długosz in his Annals, where he did interpretatio romana and compared Lada to the Roman god of war Mars. Długosz's description was then copied by subsequent Polish authors, such as Maciej Miechowita. Długosz and Miechowita together became sources for Marcin Kromer. Długosz, Miechowita and Kromer together became sources for Maciej Stryjkowski, Marcin and Joachim Bielski. (Note: The brevity and general style indicate that Kromer was also a source for Bielski, but he is not listed in the bibliography.) Alexander Guagnini took his information from Stryjkowski and was even accused of plagiarism by him. He differs, however, as to the function of the gods. The information contained in Powieść świętokrzyska was copied from Maciej Miechowita. Additionally, there is no information about such a cult on Łysa Góra in other sources and it is contradicted by archaeology.

East Slavic sources cannot be considered independent sources either. Although the Hustyn Chronicle contains original content, it is also a compilation of various earlier East Slavic as well as Polish sources. The fragment of Chronicle mentioning the god Lado copies information from Kromer, Marcin Bielski, and Guagnini. The same problem applies to the Synopsis, which copied information from Kromer and Stryjkowski, as well as from the Chronicle.

=== Genesis ===
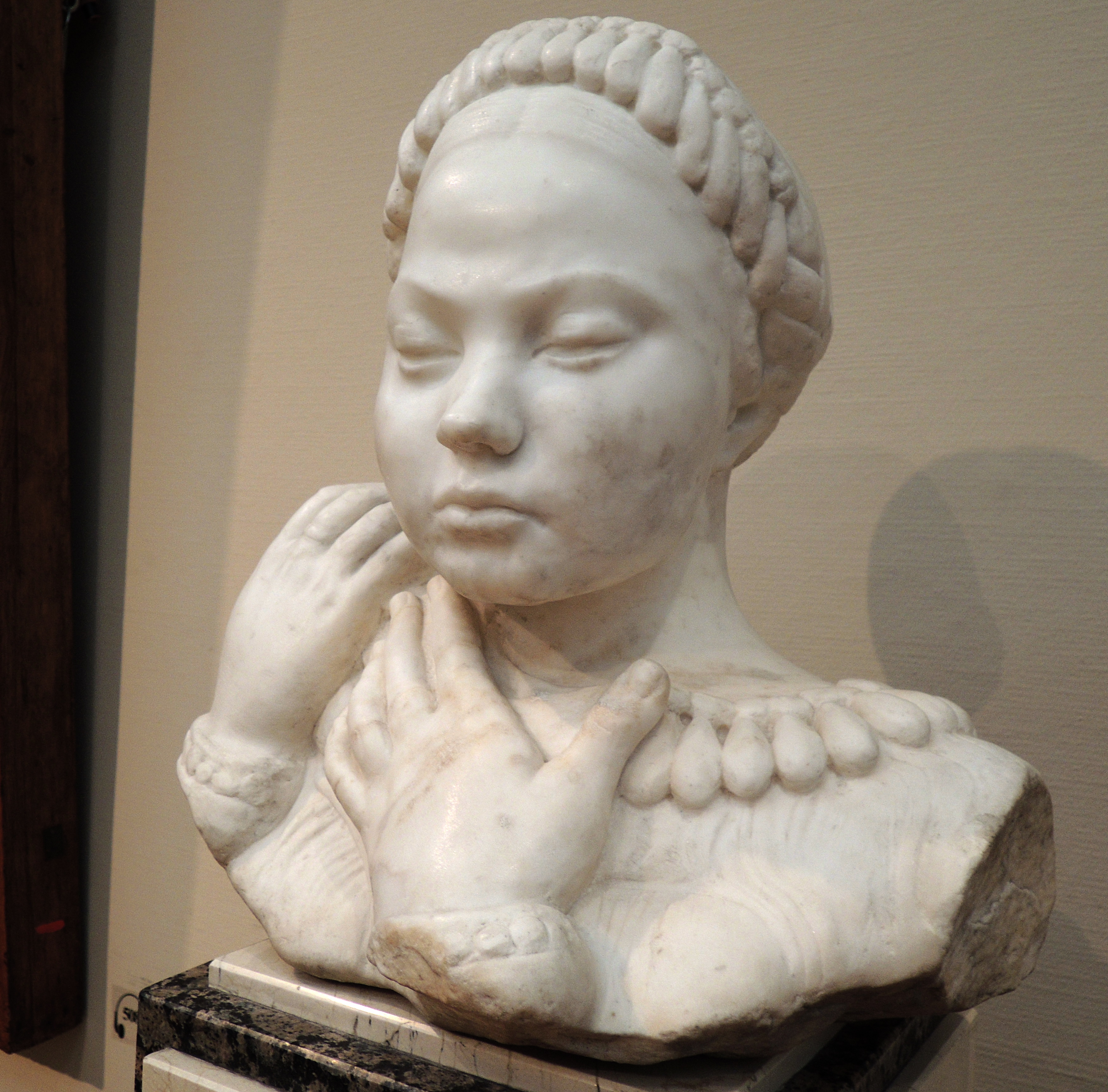
Sergey Konenkov, Lada

Originally, the authenticity of the deity/deities was not denied and they appeared in the Slavic Romantics. Their authenticity was also assumed by early 18th and 19th century authors, such as Mikhail Popov, Mikhail Chulkov and Andrey Kaisarov, who assumed the authenticity of the Synopsis. The value of the Chronicle was also recognized by the Russian musicologist and composer Alexander Famintsyn in his 1884 work Bozhestva drevnikh slavyan. There he writes of a 17th century song from Croatia which notes "the holy god Lado" sung by girls dancing around a bonfire:

Lepi Jve terga rože
Tebi, Lado, sweti bože,
Lado, slušaj nas, Lado!
Pewke, Lado, pewamo ti,
Sedca naše wklaniamo ti,
Lado, slušaj nas, Lado!

Additionally, he analyzed songs from all over the Slavdom, the existence of which was to prove the existence of the goddess Lada, wife of Lado.

Russia: Oy lelu Lado! O Lado moye! Ladu, Ladu, Ladu! Divo Lado!	Ukraine and Galicia: Oy Did Lado! Oj Did i Lado! Ta vladu Ladom! Did Did i Lado!	Serbia: Lado, Lado! Lado-Le mile, Oy Lado Oy!	Bulgaria: Lade, Lado! Oy Lado, Lado!

Famintsyn believed that the theonyms should be translated as "consent", and connected them with the Roman goddess of concord and harmony Concordia, whose name also translates as "consent", and further with the goddess Bona Dea.

Starting in the 19th century, critical voices began to appear in the scientific community about the authenticity of the deities. One of the first and most influential was ethnographer and linguist Alexander Potebnja. After analyzing the source material, mainly song fragments, he came to the conclusion that lada appears in spring, summer and wedding songs, and that there are no grounds to consider this word as a remnant of the old goddess. This position was later upheld by linguists Gregor Krek and Aleksander Brückner, as well as Max Vasmer and Oleg Trubachyov. Contemporary scholars overwhelmingly reject the authenticity of the deities Lada and Lado, believing, as in the case of Jesza, that the word lada, incomprehensible to the scribe, found in folk songs, was mistakenly considered a theonym, and then its attributes were added. This view is shared by scholars who consider at least part of Długosz's mythological account to be valuable, such as Aleksander Gieysztor, Andrzej Szyjewski, (Note: Szyjewski ignores Lada in his publications.) or Vyacheslav Ivanov and Vladimir Toporov.

The last influential scholar to insist on recognizing the historicity of Lada was Boris Rybakov. In his work, Yazychestvo drevnikh slavyan (1981), he hypothesized an Indo-European origin for the goddess Lada and compared her to the Greek Leda and Demeter. In addition, he considered another alleged goddess, Lelya, to be her daughter, and considered them both to be identical with the Rozhanitse, and to be important deities in the Slavic pantheon before the rise of the "Vladimir's pantheon". According to him, Lada and Lelya ruled over spring nature and agricultural work, fertility, love and marriage. However, he negatively referred to the male god Lado claiming that lado is a vocative case from lada.

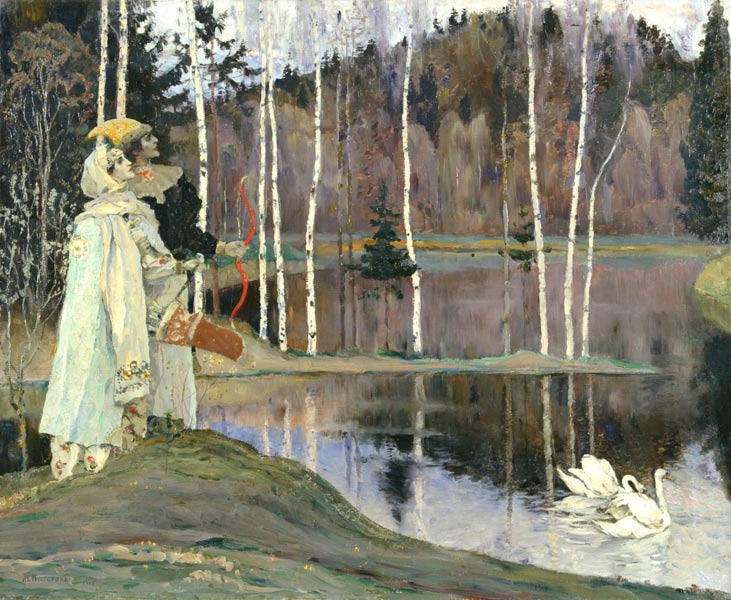
Mikhail Nesterov, Dva lada

The word lada means "wife, female lover, consort", and "husband, male lover, consort" – it is a two-gender noun and was used for women as well as men; in this respect Brückner compares it to the Polish word sługa. The word occurs, for example, in Old East Slavic as лада, lada "husband" (e.g. in The Tale of Igor's Campaign, the longing wife calls out: "bring my husband (lada) to me"), Czech lada "beloved" or "maiden, girl" (e.g. in Life of saint Catherine: "Oh, what a wonder has happened, Jesus Christ, over your beloved (lada)"), Ukrainian ла́до, lado "husband", ла́да, lada "wife", Serbo-Croatian ла̏да lada "wife", or Bulgarian ла́да, lada "the second daughter in the family who goes for water during the laduvane (ладу́ване – wedding tradition)". Słownik staropolski knows the Polish word łada only from sermons speaking about deity, so probably the word was no longer functioning in living language in the 15th century. The form Alado appearing in Postilla Husitae anonymi is probably the result of an attempt to adapt the word to Italian phonology. The form lado is not a separate word, but a vocative case from the word lada. From Slavic languages the word was borrowed into Baltic languages e.g. as lado, laduto etc.

Krzysztof Tomasz Witczak tried to read the Długosz's theonym Lyada differently from other researchers. According to him, the Latin Lyada corresponds to the Old Polish form *Lęda because the consonant ⟨l⟩ in medieval Latin in Poland was written as ly or li, and he considers that the reading *Łada is unjustified and represents a folk etymology. He believed that *Lęda was supposed to be a pagan theonym that had been demonized, and he refers here to the Russian dialectical words ляд, lyad, and ляда, lyada meaning "unclean spirit, devil". However, as Michał Łuczyński notes, the assumption that the ly notation corresponds to the vowel ⟨l⟩ justifies the reading of the Latin name as *Lada rather than *Lęda. In addition, an analysis of Długosz's personal spelling features shows that the ly notation also served him for the consonant ⟨ł⟩, e.g: Lyassza Gora "Łysa Góra", or Lyeba "Łeba". Therefore, it should be assumed that Długosz's Lyada corresponds to the old Polish form *Łada, as it is interpreted traditionally.

==== Further etymology ====
The Proto-Slavic form of lada is reconstructed as *lada. Further etymology is unclear; it is generally believed that *lada is etymologically related to the Proto-Slavic noun and root *ladъ (Polish: ład, Russian: лад) meaning "harmony, order". According to Brückner, the word derives from the verb ładzić "to concur, agree" (Proto-Slavic *laditi) → "concurring, agreeing couple" → "husband, wife" or "lovers". The etymology of the word *ladъ is also unclear, and a kinship with Gothic 𐌻𐌴𐍄𐌰𐌽 (letan "to let") has been suggested, or some relation to the word *lagoda "gentleness" – according to Brückner and Nikolay Shanskiy lad contains the decayed root la- "over" found in lagoda expanded with the suffix -d (cf. зад zad, под pod). According to Shanskiy lad originally meant "top, peak", as opposed to pod "bottom, pit". He also points to the word сладить, sladit' "to win (over) someone" and suggests the following shift in meaning: "to win" → "to bring order" → *laditi "to live in harmony" → *ladъ "harmony, order".

=== Dida and Dido ===
Based on the Did-Lada refrain, uncritical and romantic old researchers, in addition to inventing Lada, also invented the god Dido and the goddess Dida.

Famintsyn considered these words as borrowed from the Baltic languages and pointed to the Lithuanian didis "big, great". However, the attested fragment from the Slovak songs Didi-Jane, Didi-Jene "o St. John" sung on Saint John day may indicate to the native origins of these words (Proto-Slavic *did- "big, great"). The Proto-Slavic form may be continued by the Polish *dzidzi, which is most likely found in another theonym mentioned by Długosz: Dzidzilela.

== Lada as Baltic goddess ==
There is also a view among Baltic Romantics and some scholars that Lada was also worshipped by the Balts.

The word lada, and its various derivatives, appear in the refrains of sutartinės, Lithuanian polyphony songs, in various combinations, such as Lado tatato / Laduto, laduto / Loduta, loduta / Liadeli, liadeli / Ladutela, laduta, and others. Zenonas Slaviūnas grouped these songs as follows: workers' songs, wedding songs, military songs, family songs, dance songs, and songs about nature. Similarly, but more precisely, Vanda Misevičienė classified them, moving the songs about crane to the groups of rye-gathering songs and the songs about fir tree to the groups of family songs.

According to Norbertas Vėlius, although the songs belong to different groups, they all have much in common. For example, in the sutartinės about the conifer, the image about the maturation of young people is poetically represented by a conifer tree that outgrows all the trees in the forest. In another song, a crane is called upon to fly into the garden, pick flowers and make a wreath – this motif evokes the idea that a bride-to-be should start making a wreath to join the ranks of adults. In another sutartinės the shooter kills a crane, which is supposed to mean a girl taken by a boy, and in yet another song the crane is asked to feed "his children". The songs Kad mes buvom and Selagij viteli rikavo are openly wedding songs and tell of courtship. Also, the song Išjos brolis, which has a military character, is sung on behalf of a sister who talks about her feelings. Finally, the song Laduto, laduto tells about the bad relationship between daughter-in-law and father-in-law. According to Vėlius, all songs with these refrains refer to young people, especially girls who have reached adulthood. Thus, it should be considered that if the word Lado occurring in these refrains had any meaning, it should be associated primarily with young people.

In his search for the origin of these words, Vėlius points to Stryjowski's Chronicle, where he describes the custom of dancing and singing Lado, lado ir mano lado in honor of "Liada or Ladona – the mother of Castor and Pollux". In another place of his Chronicle dedicated to Lithuania and Samogitia, he writes that Lithuanians worshipped the god Dzidzis Lado, in whose honor they sang Lado, lado, lado didis mūsų dieve. He also mentions Kromer's Chronicle and the Kievan Synopsis. He notes, however, that the reliability of these sources is low and cites the opinions of Lithuanian researchers, such as Simonas Stanevičius, who believed that the god Lado was invented by Stryjkowski on the basis of a folk songs, Simonas Daukantas, who regarded the god Dzidzis Lado as a distorted form of Titis leido referring to Perkūnas, Mikalojus Akelaitis, according to whom Lado is a distorted form from laide or leide, and Brückner, according to whom Lado was borrowed into Lithuanian songs along with the Kupala night, and several other Lithuanian scholars who rejected the deity's authenticity. He also recalls that the Slavic deity Lada/Lado is regarded with distrust by Slavic scholars. He also mentions several Lithuanian and Slavic researchers who accepted the deity's authenticity, but notes that many of them were not mythologists but ethnographers who did not study the deity's authenticity.

However, according to him, an argument for the existence of the goddess could be the Bulgarian custom of laduvane, during which the second girl in the family who goes to fetch water is called "lada". The Greek dragon Ladon may also be an argument, assuming that the coincidence of the similarity of words is not accidental, and the Lithuanian words ladėti, laduti meaning "to reprimand, abuse", "to curse, damn", as well as the Latvian lādēt, and words from the semantic field "to curse", also often have a mythological meaning.

Bronislava Kerbelytė argues against the existence of the goddess Lada among the Balts. She states that the Slavic chant lada generally appears in wedding songs, and she reads the word did as "dziad, grandfather", which sometimes appears in the names of Slavic ritual objects around the winter solstice, such as dednik (or badnjak) or didukh, which are associated with the cult of fertility. In Russian, the wedding is sometimes called rukobitije ("crossing of arms"), from which the clapping while singing the refrains of the lada during children's songs may derive. She further points out the analogy between East Slavic songs with the refrain lada and songs during Līgo noted by Eduards Volters. Latvian līgt meaning "to employ," "to make peace," and līgums "to agree," along with Lithuanian lygti, sulygti "to consult, negotiate, agree," correspond to the Slavic word lad. She gives the example of a story about a Gypsy who forced a peasant to exchange horses by jokingly suggesting to the villager that they should go to an inn, shake hands, and shout liko. When they did so, the gypsy took the peasant's horse, taking advantage of the fact that the peasant had forgotten the meaning of shaking hands and the shouting. The symbol of crossed hands was also used during Lithuanian summer solstice celebrations, e.g. a couple would jump over the fire holding hands: if they let go while jumping, they would not get married.

Jan Łasicki (16-17th century) mentions god Tavalas in one of his works. Scholars have compared this name to a song written by Simonas Daukantas sung by boys dragging a log on Christmas Eve, which was supposed to prove the existence of the god Tabalas:

Tabalai, tai tai tai,
Judink, seni, kaulus,
Up up up,
Sumušk rankom delnus

However, an analysis of the song and language shows that tabalai is derived from the verb tabaluoti "to dangle". The authenticity of other deities mentioned by Łasicki is also rejected, e.g.: alleged theonym Šluotražis is derived from the word šluotražis "broom" and was a magical and symbolic (related to healing) ritual object, to which it has already been explained by many scholars. Thus, according to Kerbelytė, there are no grounds to consider Tabalas or Lada as Lithuanian deities – these words were only magic words or objects used in rituals and ceremonies. The lado refrain is also considered a ritual vocabulary by Lithuanian ethnologist Rimantas Balsys, who blames the misunderstanding in the Baltic context on the uncritical use of 16th century sources and the activity of the Romantics, who considered the ritual ledų dienos ("day of ice") as proof of the existence of the winter goddess Lada. In the case of the historicity of the Slavic deity, he takes a neutral position.

== Bibliography ==
- Alvarez-Pedroza, Juan Antonio (2021). Sources of Slavic Pre-Christian Religion. Leiden: Koninklijke Brill. ISBN 978-90-04-44138-5.
- Balsys, Rimantas (2006). "Lada (Didis Lado) baltų ir slavų rašytiniuose šaltiniuose". Acta Baltico-Slavica. 30: 597–609.
- Brückner, Aleksander (1985). Mitologia słowiańska. Warszawa: Państwowe Wydawnictwo Naukowe. ISBN 8301062452.
- Brückner, Aleksander (1927). "ład". Słownik etymologiczny languagea polskiego. Kraków: Krakowska Spółka Wydawnicza.
- Derwich, Marek (1996). "Wiarygodność przekazów pisemnych na temat kultu pogańskiego na Łyścu. Archeologia a źródła pisane" [Reliability of written sources on pagan worship in Łysiec. Archaeologist and written sources]. Słowiańszczyzna w Europie średniowiecznej. 1, Plemiona i wczesne państwa. Wrocław: Werk: 97–104.
- Famintsyn, Alexander (1884). Божества древних славян (in Russian) (1 ed.). Saint Petersburg: Тип. Э. Арнгольда.
- Gieysztor, Aleksander (2006). Mitologia Słowian. Warsaw: Wydawnictwa Uniwersytetu Warszawskiego. ISBN 978-83-235-0234-0.
- Ivanov, Vyacheslav; Toporov, Vladimir (1980). "Славянская мифология". In Tokarev, Sergei (ed.). Мифы народов мира: Энциклопедия (in Russian). Vol. 2. Moscow: Большая российская энциклопедия. pp. 450–456. Archived from the original on 2014-07-16.
- Kerbelytė, Bronislava (2009). "Folkloro duomenys - senosios raštijos žinių vertinimo priemonė". Tautosakos darbai. 37: 13–30.
- Kolankiewicz, Leszek (1999). Dziady. Teatr święta zmarłych. Gdańsk: Słowo/Obraz Terytoria. ISBN 8387316393.
- Łuczyński, Michał (2020). Bogowie dawnych Słowian. Studium onomastyczne. Kielce: Kieleckie Towarzystwo Naukowe. ISBN 978-83-60777-83-1.
- Mačuda, Jiří (2012). Rodnověřské obřady a ruská lidová kultura (in Czech). Brno: Masaryk University.
- Potebnja, Alexander (1882). "Объяснение малорусских и сродных песен". Русский филологический вестник (in Russian). 7 (2 ed.). тип. М. Земкевича и В. Ноаковского.
- Schmadel, Lutz (2012). "(2832) Lada". Dictionary of Minor Planet Names. Berlin: Springer Science & Business Media. Bibcode:2012dmpn.book.....S. doi:10.1007/978-3-642-29718-2. ISBN 978-3-642-29717-5.
- Shanskiy, Nikolay; Bobrova, Tatyana (2004). Школьный этимологический словарь русского языка. Происхождение слов (in Russian). Moscow: Дрофа. p. 231. ISBN 5-7107-8679-9.
- Sokolov, Mikhail Evgenievich (2014). Старорусские солнечные Боги и Богини. Рипол Классик. ISBN 9785458247511.
- Suszko, Henryk (2003). Latopis hustyński. Opracowanie, przekład i komentarze. Wrocław: Wydawnictwo Uniwersytetu Wrocławskiego. ISBN 83-229-2412-7.
- Téra, Michal (2009). Perun: Bůh hromovládce (in Czech). Červený Kostelec: Pavel Mervart. ISBN 978-80-86818-82-5.
- Trubachyov, Oleg (1987a). "*lada". Этимологический словарь русского языка (in Russian). Vol. 14. Moscow: Nauka.
- Trubachyov, Oleg (1987b). "*ladъ". Этимологический словарь русского языка (in Russian). Vol. 14. Moscow: Nauka.
- Vasmer, Max (1986a). "лад". Этимологический словарь русского языка (in Russian). Vol. 2. Translated by Trubachyov, Oleg (2 ed.). Moscow: Progress.
- Vasmer, Max (1986b). "ла́да". Этимологический словарь русского языка (in Russian). Vol. 2. Translated by Trubachyov, Oleg (2 ed.). Moscow: Progress.
- Vėlius, Norbertas (2000). "О семантике припева lado в литовских сутартинес". Балто-славянские исследования. XIV. Moscow: 189–196.
- Znayenko, Myroslava T. (1980). The Gods of Ancient Slavs: Tatishchev and the Beginnings of Slavic Mythology. Columbus: Slavica. ISBN 0-89357-074-5.
