= Niya (mythology) =

Slavic god or death god

- Underworld
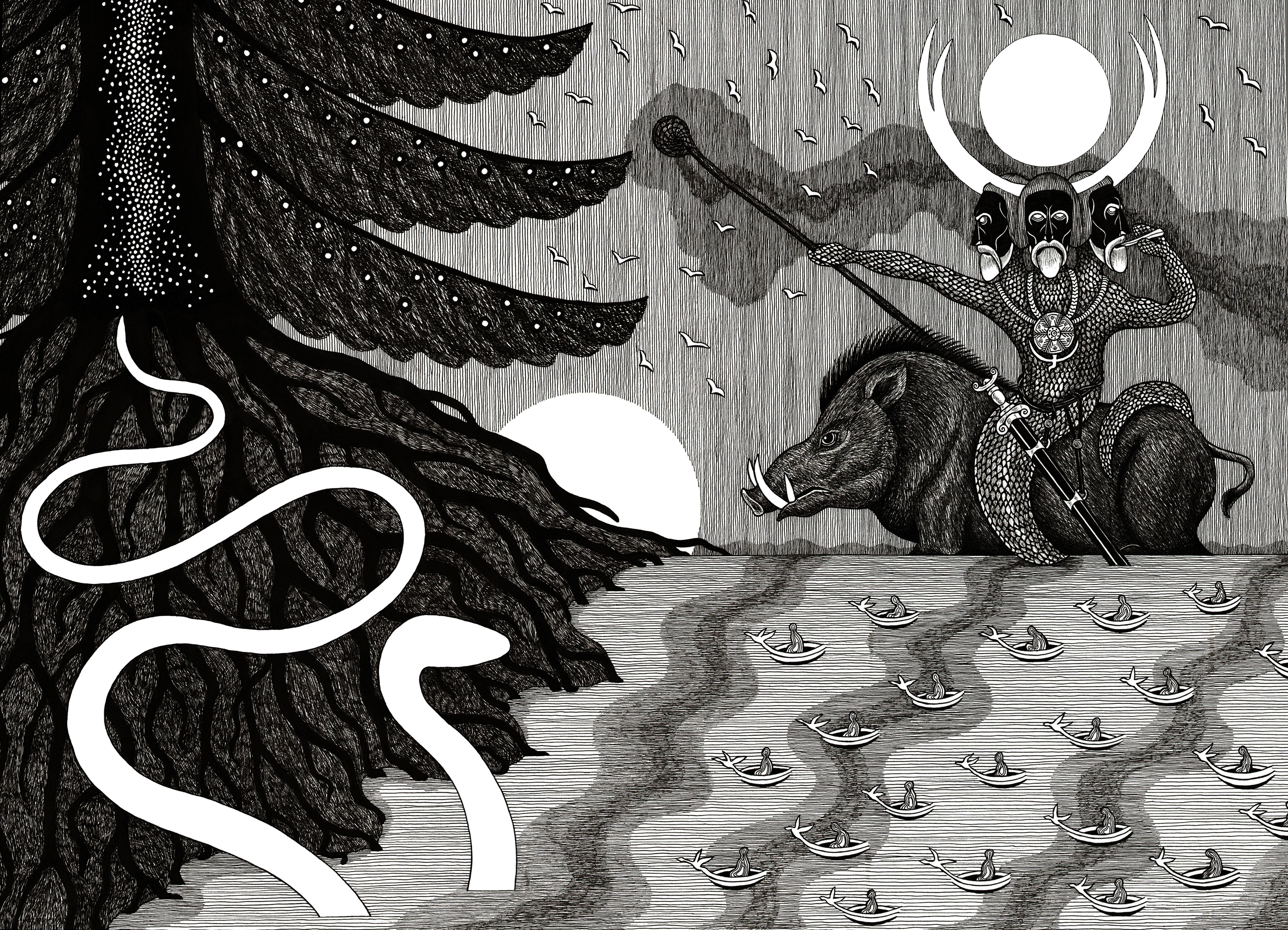
- Nyja, Marek Hapon, 2017
- Other names: Nya, Tiya, Yaya
- Venerated in: Poland
- Major cult center: Gniezno

Equivalents
- Greek: Hades
- Roman: Pluto

Niya (Polish: Nyja IPA: [nɨja], Nija IPA: [ɲja], Latin: Nya) is a Lechitic god of the underworld of unknown sex, whose exact functions are unknown. Niya is mentioned together with other gods worshipped by Poles, such as Yesha, Łada, or Devana. Niya's cult may be demonstrated by the sayings "Go to Niye" ("pójść do Nyje") and "Dwell in Nya" ("bydlić w Nyi") collected by Polish ethnographer Aleksander Brückner. In recent years, the confidence in the authenticity of Niya has increased in the scientific community.

== Etymology ==
According to Stanisław Urbańczyk, the name Niya comes from the root ny-, which appears in the Old Polish word nyć, meaning "to fade, disappear". The variant naw appears in Ruthenian and Bulgarian in the forms nav, navje, navka. Andrzej Szyjewski agrees with this claim, adding that Niya is an echo of the proto-Slavic word *nawь meaning "corpse", "deceased." In Bulgarian spells, there are "twelve naves" as evil demons spreading the plague, and South Slavic navije or navje are seen as evil birds harassing pregnant women. In the Eastern Slavs, "navya bone" was used in rites related to death. In other Slavic languages nici means "lying face downwards" which indicates the downward direction and chthonic afterlife.

Oleg Trubachyov also noted the relationship between the proto-Slavic word *navь and the Proto-Indo-European word *nāu, meaning "to flow", and pointed to the Latin word navis meaning "boat". This would connect Niya with the function of a psychopomp and in that case would be the equivalent of the Greek Charon.

Aleksander Brückner took the name from the word niti meaning "to rot", "to molder".

== Sources ==
The first source mentioning a deity named Niya is theologian Lucas of Wielki Koźmin. As the most likely author of the Gniezno sermon created in the years 1410–1412 for bishop Wojciech Jastrzębiec, he wrote:

One should pay attention to those who say ungodly things today in dances or elsewhere in performances, consider unclean things in their hearts, shout out and mention the names of idols, and consider whether conversion to God the Father is possible. Certainly not. For it is forbidden to hear freely these holidays, which unfortunately celebrate according to what was left of the rites of the accursed pagans of our ancestors, unless for punishment, as once the shout of the inhabitants of Sodom and Gomorrah rose. For at this festival indecent exposure and other abominations, which the Apostle says should not even be named because of God the Father. However, due to the fact that preachers have arrived, such things cease, and in many places they have already ceased [...] There is no other name under heaven in which we can be saved. For a man is not saved in the name of Lado, Jassa, !Quia, Nija, but in the name of Jesus Christ ... Not Lada, not Jassa, not Nija, which are the names of idols worshiped here in Poland, as some chronicles of Poles testify ...

— Lucas of Wielki Koźmin, Gniezno sermon (1420–1422)

Statua provincialia breviter from 1420–1422 mentions the name of the god as Tya/Tiya:

Also forbid clapping and singing which calls the names of the gods Lado, Yleli, Yassa, and Tya, which were used to celebrate during Green week.

— Mikołaj Trąba, Gniezno sermon (1410–1412)

Jan Długosz describes the cult of Nya, presenting him as the Polish equivalent of Pluto and his temple in Gniezno:

They called Pluto Niya, considering him the god of the underworld and the guardian and protector of souls when they leave the body. To him they prayed that the introduction would be after death to better places in the underground. For these souls [or: this god], the most important temple was built in the city of Gniezno, to which pilgrims came from all sides.

— Jan Długosz, Annales seu cronici incliti regni Poloniae (1455–1480)

After Długosz, the cult of Nya is described by Maciej Stryjkowski:

Pluto, also the infernal god, whom they called Nya, praised the evening, and also asked him for a better and earlier place in hell and rain, or to tame the bad weather, whose church was the holiest in Gniezno, as Dlugosus testifies.

— Maciej Stryjkowski, O starodawnych ceremoniach albo raczej szaleństwach ruskich, polskich, żmudzkich, litewskich, liflandskich i pruskich obywatelów bałwochwalców i różność ich bogów fałszywych (1582)

Jakub Parkoszowic writes about Nya as a god of Poles independently of sources from Jan Długosz in his traktat o ortografii polskiej ("treatise on Polish orthography"):

whenever it came soft "n" ... , they were always written with a double "y" in front of the appropriate vowel ... Such spelling was not enough to differentiate, because between "Nija", which was the name of the idol, and "nia", a syllable in the word 'gniazdo', there was no difference in spelling.

After Długosz, the cult of Nya is also described by Maciej Miechowita. Niya was also mentioned by Marcin Bielski and his son Joachim and by priest Jakub Wujek together with other gods worshipped by Poles. Sermones per circulum anni Cunradi from 1423 mentions about god named Yaya which is believed to be other version of name of Niya.

== Description ==
=== Temple in Gniezno ===
When writing about Niya, Długosz mentions a temple that was to be built in his honour in Gniezno. Archaeological research carried out at Lech Hill revealed the presence of a stone structure in the form of a mound on which were found fragments of animal bones and early-medieval ceramics, probably representing traces of sacrifices there. In addition, at the top of the hill there was a periodically wet basin, which in the theological vision of the world could emphasize the sacred (aquatic-chtonic) character of the place. Archaeologist Paweł Szczepanik interprets it as a remnant of a cult site corresponding to the temple mentioned in the chronicle of Długosz.

=== Interpretations ===
Grzegorz Niedzielski believes that Tiya (and/or Diya) is not a distortion of the name Niya but rather the other name of Niya. He derives Diya and Tiya from dąć, tchnąć – "to blow, breathe" from which comes dech, tchnienie – "breath", followed by duch "spirit", dusza "soul", natchnienie "inspiration". The Greek term for god – θεός (theós) – is to come from the same indoeuropean root *dheu-. He also notes the connections between characters with similar names and the underworld in Greek mythology: nymph Thynia is said to be the mother of Delphus who replaced Python as Delphic oracle and the name Python is derived from the same root as the Indic mythological serpent Ahi Budhnya and badnjak. Semele changed her name to Thyone after she was rescued by her son Dionysus from Hades and she is related to Dionysian frenzy – inspiration. Anthesteria is festival of Dionysus where dead were resurrected. A similar relationship can be found in Slavdom: vilas, Bulgarian wilněja ("crazy, someone who lost his mind"), Czech wilny ("voluptuous"), Slavic velna ("wave, waters") and Panslavic god of underground Veles (probably from *wel – death). Latin word thya, thyon means "fragrant tree" and brings to mind a wooden log depicting badnjak. He also notes the similarity of the names of Niya, badnjak, badnik and bannik, suggesting the common sound cluster "b-(d)-n-j" (also existing in the name Ahi Budhnya), similar to the word bezdenna [przepaść], the "bottomless [pit]" connected to the abode of god of underground. In that case Niya's name could mean "Disappearing [in the abyss]" and be equivalent to the meaning of Hades's name "The Unseen One, The Invisible One".

For Alexander Gieysztor, Niya is the equivalent of Pluto. Brückner, who was hypercritical of the Długosz pantheon, said that Niya could indeed be a pagan remnant. According to Krzysztof Witczak, Niya is the Slavic equivalent of the Greek goddess Enyo. Both were supposed to be the remains of a proto-Indo-European goddess, "the perpetrator, the performer of disappearance, i.e. drying, disappearing", and reconstructed the name of this goddess as *Nūyā. Szczepaniak states that Niya is a female deity, caring for the dead, human fate and the community of the living. For Kolankiewicz, Niya was the equivalent of Veles as guardian of souls of the dead and synonymous with the moon.

== Bibliography ==
- Kolankiewicz, Leszek (1999). Dziady. Teatr święta zmarłych. Gdańsk: Słowo/Obraz Terytoria. ISBN 8387316393.
- Szczepanik, Paweł (2018). Słowiańskie Zaświaty. Wierzenia, wizje i mity. Szczecin: Wydawnictwo Triglav. ISBN 978-83-62586-73-8.
- Gieysztor, Aleksander (2006). Mitologia Słowian. ISBN 83-235-0234-X.
- Szyjewski, Andrzej (2003). Religia Słowian. ISBN 83-7318-205-5.
- Strzelczyk, Jerzy (2007). Mity, podania i wierzenia dawnych Słowian. ISBN 978-83-7301-973-7.
- Brückner, Aleksander (1985). Mitologia słowiańska. ISBN 8301062452.
- Niedzielski, Grzegorz (2011). Królowie z gwiazd. Mitologia plemion prapolskich. Sandomierz: Armoryka. ISBN 978-83-7950-077-2.
