= Jesza =

Alleged Polish god

Jesza (read as Yesha; Latin: Jessa, Yesza) or Jasza (read as Yasha; Latin: Yassa, Jassa) is an alleged Polish god. He was first mentioned around 1405–1412 in the sermons of Lucas of Wielki Koźmin, which warned against the worship of Jesza and other gods during spring rituals and folk performances. His popularity is partly owed Jan Długosz's comparison of him to the Roman god Jupiter. However, the opinions of the 20th century and later researchers are divided with respect to the authenticity of the deity.

The Latin names should be written in modern Polish as Jesza or Jasza. In the 15th century, the Polish voiceless retroflex fricative (sh sound) was written as ss (modern Polish sz).

== Sources ==
The first known source mentioning the name Jesza is the Pentacostal Sermons written by Lucas of Wielki Koźmin around 1405–1412, without giving any specific description:

One should pay attention to those who say ungodly things today in dances or elsewhere in performances, consider unclean things in their hearts, shout out and mention the names of idols, and consider whether conversion to God the Father is possible. Certainly not. For it is forbidden to hear freely these holidays, which unfortunately celebrate according to what was left of the rites of the accursed pagans of our ancestors, unless for punishment, as once the shout of the inhabitants of Sodom and Gomorrah rose. For at this festival indecent exposure and other abominations, which the Apostle says should not even be named because of God the Father. However, due to the fact that preachers have arrived, such things cease, and in many places they have already ceased [...] There is no other name under heaven in which we can be saved. For a man is not saved in the name of Lado, Jassa, Qiya, Nyia, but in the name of Jesus Christ ... Not Lada, not Jassa, not Nija, which are the names of idols worshiped here in Poland, as some chronicles of Poles testify...

— Lucas of Wielki Koźmin, Pentacostal Sermons, around 1405–1412

Similar warnings, also without any description, are also found in: Statua provincialia breviter (1420–1422), Sermones per circulum anni Cunradi (1423), Postilla Husitae anonymi, and in glosses of Life of Adalbert of Prague.

The theonyms contained in the Pentacostal Sermons were also repeated by Jan Długosz, who made an interpretatio romana and compared Jesza to the Roman chief god Jupiter:

Jupiter they called Yesza [or Jessa] in their tongue; they believed that he, as the most important god, was responsible for all favourable meteorological phenomena, and for everything which happened to them, both negative and fortunate. To him they also dedicated the highest honours compared with the other deities, and they performed sacrifices to him more frequently.

— Jan Długosz, Annals or Chronicles of the Famous Kingdom of Poland, 1455

After Długosz the information about Jesza was repeated by historians Maciej Miechowita, Marcin Kromer, Alexander Guagnini, Maciej Stryjkowski, Marcin and Joachim Bielskis, and the priest Jakub Wujek.

== Historicity ==
Originally, the historicity of Jesza was not questioned; he appears in the works of Polish Romantics, such as Bronisław Trentowski. This situation changed when Aleksander Brückner criticised the sources mentioning Jesza. Brückner pointed out that the word ješa (yesha) in Old Church Slavonic meant "may", and he also hypothesized that it could not have been the name of the old god as, in his opinion, it was accidentally heard in folk songs. Although this position was not fully embraced by other scholars such as Karol Potkański, it was subsequently supported by such scholars as Henryk Łowmiański, or Stanisław Urbańczyk though none of these were aware of the Lucas of Wielki Koźmin postilla.

Contemporary scholars often criticize Brückner's views on the information given by Długosz, regarding them as hypercritical. However, many scholars, such as Aleksander Gieysztor, or Vyacheslav Ivanov and Vladimir Toporov, who consider at least part of Długosz's mythological account valuable also reject the historicity of Jesza, and believe the deity was created through a misunderstanding of the refrains of folk songs or words, as suggested by Brückner, or ignore him in their publications as does Andrzej Szyjewski,. According to Brückner, Długosz considered Jesza to be equivalent to Jupiter because of the phonetic similarity (Polish: Jowisz "Jupiter", from Latin Jovis).

Other modern scholars, such as the historian Włodzimierz Szafrański, the cultural anthropologist Leszek Kolankiewicz and the historian and medievalist Krzysztof Bracha appear more willing to accept the authenticity of the theonym.

=== Origin ===
The word ješa occurs in Old Church Slavonic (ѥша, ⰵⱎⰰ) as a wishful participle "I wish that, utinam". As an example, a passage from the Old Church Slavonic translation of the Bible ješa i nie sьbrali sьbora is given, which is translated as "would indeed they had not convened the council!". According to linguists, originally the word ješa meant "may be" and was third-person singular optative of the word *jesmь ("I am") – so easily the original meaning of "may be" could have shifted into "if only". Consequently, there is a consensus among scholars that the word jesza appearing in the church texts occurs in this sense and was mistakenly considered a deity. However, etymological dictionaries state that the word ješa is attested only in Old Church Slavonic (and its Russian and Serbian versions), and no researcher has indicated where this word found its way into Polish chants.

Another explanation is proposed by Michał Łuczyński, who points to Maria Malec's work Imiona chrześcijańskie w średniowiecznej Polsce. According to Malec, the suffix -sz forms 56 derivations from Christian names, 15 times with Christian names ending in a consonant and 40 times with Christian names ending in a vowel, and she points to the names Busz, Dasz, Desz, Dosz, Gasz, Niesz, Siesz and others. She also lists the name Jasz – Jesz, as two phonetic variants of one name: Jasz (Latin: Georgium Jasch) as a Lesser Poland name from 1228, and Jesz (Latin: Iohannis Jesz) as a Mazovian name from 1429, and their variants: Jaszak, Jaszek, Jaszko, Jeszek, Jeszko, Jeszel. Also attested is the hypocoristic (diminutive) of the name with the suffix -a: Jasza (Latin: Apud Iaszkonem dictum Iasscha) from 1408. These names are an abbreviation of the name Jan, Polish equivalent of John, so the name Jesza should be considered as its derivative.

== Interpretations ==
Despite strong criticism of the source material mentioning Jesza, some scholars have accepted or are accepting its historicity and have made interpretations of this theonym.

According to Włodzimierz Szafrański, Jesza could have been a Pan-Slavic or even Pan-Indo-European god. He believed that the name of the god, Jesza, was clearly etymologically related to another Indo-European god, the Celtic Esus, whose name was derived, as in the case of the Norse Æsir (in Old Norse áss, óss meant "god"), from the same Indo-European root *ansu- ("lord, ruler, god"). Also derived from this stem is the Avestan word ahura meaning "lord", and which later became the epithet of the Zarathushtrian god Ahura Mazda as "Lord of Wisdom", to whom the yasna ritual is dedicated, the Sanskrit word ásura "divine, powerful", or the Hittite ḫaššuš "king". In Georges Dumézil's trifunctional hypothesis Esus is compared to Jupiter and Odin, and this should support Długosz' comparison of Jesza to Jupiter. In the case of the second form of the deity's name, Jasza, Szafrański believed that an additional influence on its formation could have been exerted by the Sarmatian/Alanian tribe of Jasz living in part of today's Poland.

According to Leszek Kolankiewicz, Jesza was the Polish equivalent of Dazhbog (or Svarog, assuming that Dazhbog is the local equivalent of Svarog) stating that the names of both gods actually mean the same. He points to another wish-particle, bodaj, and quotes a 15th-century wish Bogdaj mu zaległ usta wrzód literally meaning "Lord/God, let him have an ulcer in his mouth" with a clear structure daj Boże "please God", and this brings to mind associations with Dazhbog, whose name is translated in two ways: either as daj-bog "God who gives", or as dag-bog, where the first part comes from the Proto-Indo-European stem *dag meaning "to burn", i.e. "God who burns". Thus Jesza, like Dazhbog, would have been the god of sun and fire, the giving, punishing and burning god. He concludes at the same time that since Lada is always mentioned first in the sources, she (or he) may have been the most important god.

== Jesza in culture ==
Manuscript by Bronislaw Trentowski: With the word Halu Jessa created the world and all that existed in it. Therefore Triglav, having heard it, tore off his three heads, and from the blood that flowed from them arose hosts of three successive deities.

== Bibliography ==
- Kolankiewicz, Leszek (1999). Dziady. Teatr święta zmarłych. Gdańsk: Słowo/Obraz Terytoria. ISBN 8387316393.
- Bracha, Krzysztof (2014). "Tria Ydola Polonorum". In Bracha, Krzysztof; Hadamik, Czesław (eds.). Sacrum pogańskie - Sacrum chrześcijańskie. Warszawa: DiG. p. 400. ISBN 978-83-7181-873-8.
- Potkański, Karol (1924). Pisma pośmiertne.
- Brückner, Aleksander (1985). Mitologia słowiańska. Warsaw: Państwowe Wydawnictwo Naukowe. ISBN 8301062452.
- Gieysztor, Aleksander (2006). Mitologia Słowian. Warsaw: Wydawnictwa Uniwersytetu Warszawskiego. ISBN 978-83-235-0234-0.
- Szyjewski, Andrzej (2003). Religia Słowian. Kraków: Wydawnictwo WAM. ISBN 83-7318-205-5.
- Łuczyński, Michał (2020). Bogowie dawnych Słowian. Studium onomastyczne. Kielce: Kieleckie Towarzystwo Naukowe. ISBN 978-83-60777-83-1.
- Szafrański, Włodzimierz (1987). Prahistoria religii na ziemiach polskich. Wrocław: Ossolineum. ISBN 83-04-02624-4.
- Szafrański, Włodzimierz (1979). Pradzieje religii w Polsce. Warszawa: Iskry. pp. 355–386. ISBN 83-207-0035-3.
- Kempiński, Andrzej (1993). Słownik mitologii ludów indoeuropejskich. Poznań: Kantor Wydawniczy SAWW. ISBN 83-85066-91-8.
- Łowmiański, Henryk (1979). Religia Słowian i jej upadek, w. VI-XII. Warsaw: Państwowe Wydawnictwo Naukowe. ISBN 83-01-00033-3.
- Urbańczyk, Stanisław (1947). Religia pogańskich Słowian. Kraków: Wydawnictwo Studium Słowiańskiego Uniwersytetu Jagiellońskiego.
- Ivanov, Vyacheslav; Toporov, Vladimir (1980). "СЛАВЯНСКАЯ МИФОЛОГИЯ". In Tokarev, Sergei (ed.). Мифы народов мира: Энциклопедия. Vol. 2. Moscow: Большая российская энциклопедия. pp. 450–456.
- Alwin, Kloekhorst (2007). Etymological Dictionary of the Hittite Inherited Lexicon. Leiden: Brill. ISBN 978-90-04-16092-7.
- Vasmer, Max (1986). "еша". Этимологический словарь русского языка (in Russian). Vol. 2 (2 ed.). Moscow: Progress.
- Trubachyov, Oleg (1979). "*eša". Этимологический словарь русского языка (in Russian). Vol. 6. Moscow: Nauka.
- Alvarez-Pedroza, Juan Antonio (2021). Sources of Slavic Pre-Christian Religion. Leiden: Koninklijke Brill. ISBN 978-90-04-44138-5.
