= Censorship in Poland =

Censorship in Poland was first recorded in the 15th century, and it was most notable during the Communist period in the 20th century.

== Kingdom of Poland and the Polish-Lithuanian Commonwealth ==
The history of censorship in Poland dates to the late 15th or the first half of the 16th century. The first recorded incident dates to the late 15th century in the Kingdom of Poland related to a complaint by Szwajpolt Fioł (a Franconian from Neustadt living in Krakow) against a Polish bishop who forbade a printer in Kraków from printing liturgical books in Cyrillic script; Fioł lost the case and was sentenced to prison, becoming the first known victim of censorship in Poland. In 1519 sections of the book Chronica Polonorum by Maciej Miechowita, critical of the ruling Jagiellonian dynasty, were censored, making it in turn the first known Polish work to be subject to cuts by censors. A decree of king Zygmunt I Stary of 1523 has been called the first law about censorship in Poland. Together with a series of further edicts by Sigmismund August it prohibited the import and even reading of a number of books related to the Reformation. An edict of Stefan Batory of 1579 in the Polish-Lithuanian Commonwealth introduced the idea of wartime censorship, prohibiting distributing information on military actions. In the 17th century Poland saw the publication and adoption of the first Polish editions of the Index Librorum Prohibitorum (1601, 1603, 1617), which among others banned the books of Erasmus of Rotterdam, Andrzej Frycz Modrzewski, Copernicus, Stanisław Sarnicki, Jan Łaski, as well as some other satires (pl:Literatura sowizdrzalska). Extensive internal censorship was also used by the Roman Catholic Church in Poland, as well as by other denominations in Poland, including the Protestant and the Orthodox Churches as well as by the Polish Jews. Outside the religious sphere, several royal decrees from the 17th century explicitly prohibited distribution of several texts, mainly those critical of the royalty; occasional regulations in this matter were also issued by the local municipal governments.

The idea of freedom of speech was in general highly valued by the Polish nobility, and it was one of the key dimensions distinguishing the Commonwealth from the more restrictive absolute monarchies, common in contemporary Europe. Only the banning of books that attacked the Catholic faith was relatively uncontroversial, and attempts to ban other types of works often led to heated debates. In the last century or so of the Polish-Lithuanian Commonwealth, the issue of censorship was therefore occasionally debated by Polish Sejm and regional sejmiks, usually with regards to individual works or authors, whom some deputies either defended or criticized. There were a number of lawsuits concerning individual books, and some titles were judged and sometimes doomed to be destroyed by burning. Since there was no overall law about the censorship, there were often disputes about jurisdiction in this matter between the bishops, the state officials and the Jagiellonian University. Some country-wide laws related to censorship would be eventually discussed and passed in the Sejm in the last years of the Commonwealth's existence. In particular, the Constitution of May 3, 1791, while it did not address the topics of freedom of press or censorship directly, it guaranteed the freedom of speech in its Article 11 of the "Cardinal and Inviolate Rights".

== Partitions ==
Following the partitions of Poland, which ended the existence of the independent Polish state in 1795, censorship was in force on the annexed Polish lands, as the codes of occupying states generally contained severe censorship laws. Out of the three regimes, the Russian censorship was the harshest. During some periods, the censorship was so invasive that even the usage of words Poland or Polish was not allowed.

== Second Polish Republic ==
Following Poland regaining independence in 1918, the cabinet of Jędrzej Moraczewski who served as the first Prime Minister of the Second Polish Republic between November 1918 and January 1919 removed preventive censorship, abolishing a number of laws inherited from the partition period, and replacing them with ones more supportive of the freedom of press. New press laws were issued on 7 February 1919, introducing press regulation system and giving the government control over printing houses. In 1920 during the Polish-Soviet war, information about the war was required government's approval. The March Constitution of 1921 confirmed the freedom of speech, and explicitly abolished any preventive censorship and concession system.

Following the May Coup of 1926 censorship targeting opposition press and publications intensified. In practice, Second Polish Republic has been described as having "mild censorship". The censorship was carried by the Ministry of Interior. Printing presses had to provide an advance copy to the Ministry, which could order the publication to be stopped. The publishers were allowed to dispute the Ministry decision in the courts. Newspapers were allowed to indicate that they were subject to censorship by publishing blank spaces. It was common for publishers to skirt the law, for example by delaying the sending of the first copy of a book to the Ministry, which meant that many controversial books were sold in the bookstores before the Ministry censors made their decision. The April Constitution of 1935 did not discuss the freedom of press issue, which has been seen as a step backwards in the issues related to censorship, and a Press Law decree of 1938 introduced a provision which allowed Ministry of Internal Affairs to prevent the distribution of foreign titles. 1939 saw the controversial arrest of a publisher and journalist Stanisław Mackiewicz.

In the Second Polish Republic, censorship was often employed "in defense of decency" against writers whose works were considered "immoral" or "disturbing the social order. Polish historian Ryszard Nycz described the censorship of that time as "focused primarily on anarchists, leftists, and Communist sympathizers among the avant-garde writers". Polish writers whose works were censored included Antoni Słonimski, Julian Tuwim, Józef Łobodowski, Bruno Jasieński, Anatol Stern, Aleksander Wat, Tadeusz Peiper and Marian Czuchnowski. Film censorship (focused on ensuring decency) has been described as extensive, as the law prohibited not only pornographic films but also films showing content that "generally violates codes of morality and law", a formulation that has been used to justify a number of controversial decisions, and according to its critics, made the film censors equal in power to the film directors. The director of the Central Film Bureau within the Ministry of Internal Affairs, colonel Leon Łuskino, has been described as the "terror of the film-makers".

== World War II ==
Following the Germany and Soviet occupation of Poland in 1939, the occupying powers once again introduced significant levels of censorship to Polish territories. The Germans prohibited publication of any regular Polish-language book, literary study or scholarly paper.

Censorship at first targeted books that were considered to be "serious", including scientific and educational texts and texts that were thought to promote Polish patriotism; only fiction that was free of anti-German overtones was permitted. Banned literature included maps, atlases and English- and French-language publications, including dictionaries. Several non-public indexes of prohibited books were created, and over 1,500 Polish writers were declared "dangerous to the German state and culture". The index of banned authors included such Polish authors as Adam Mickiewicz, Juliusz Słowacki, Stanisław Wyspiański, Bolesław Prus, Stefan Żeromski, Józef Ignacy Kraszewski, Władysław Reymont, Stanisław Wyspiański, Julian Tuwim, Kornel Makuszyński, Leopold Staff, Eliza Orzeszkowa and Maria Konopnicka. Mere possession of such books was illegal and punishable by imprisonment. Door-to-door sale of books was banned, and bookstores—which required a license to operate—were either emptied out or closed. The press was reduced from over 2,000 publications to a few dozen, all censored by the Germans.

== People's Republic of Poland ==
Following the communist takeover of Poland, the Main Office of Control of Press, Publications and Performances (Główny Urząd Kontroli Prasy, Publikacji i Widowisk, GUKPiW) was established in the People's Republic of Poland on 5 July 1946 although it traced its origins to the organs established by the provisional Polish communist authorities in 1944. Censorship affected all forms of media: print, television, radio and all kinds of performances. All publications and spectacles had to receive prior approval from GUKPiW, and it also had the right to annul any media publishing or broadcasting licenses. The press laws were subject to major revisions in 1984 and 1989. Communist era censorship targeted topics associated with Soviet repression against Polish citizens, works critical of communism or labeled as subversive, and much of the contemporary émigré literature. As elsewhere in the Soviet Bloc, the censorship was seen as enforcing the party line of the communist party.

The controls were particularly severe during the early years of the communist period (i.e., during the Stalinist era in Poland). During that time, censorship meant not only policing content, as even refusal to print government-endorsed texts could have severe consequences, as evidenced by an incident in 1953 when the weekly Tygodnik Powszechny was temporarily closed and lost its printing house after it refused to print the obituary of Joseph Stalin.

The censorship law was eliminated after the fall of communism in Poland, by the Polish Sejm on 11 April 1990 and the GUKPiW was closed two months later. The closing of the GUKPiW has been described as "the formal and legal fact of lifting censorship [in Poland]" and the year 1990 has been said to have seen the "definite elimination" of censorship in Poland.

== Third Polish Republic ==
The freedom of the press is guaranteed in both the modern Constitution of Poland (1997) and in the revised press law. Another article of the Constitution explicitly prevents preventive censorship, although it does not prohibit post-publishing repressive censorship which in theory might be not incompatible with the modern Polish law.

A plan for Internet censorship legislation that included the creation of a register of blocked web sites was abandoned by the Polish Government in early 2011, following protests and petitions opposing the proposal.

On 24 May 2019, Poland filed an action for annulment of the European Union's Directive on Copyright in the Digital Single Market with the Court of Justice of the European Union. Deputy Foreign Minister of Poland Konrad Szymański said the directive "may result in adopting regulations that are analogous to preventive censorship, which is discouraged not only in the Polish constitution but also in the EU treaties".

== Bypassing censorship ==
To avoid censorship, throughout the periods that censorship affected the Polish writers, some authors turned to self-censorship, others attempted to cheat the system with metaphors and Aesopian language, and yet others had their works published by the Polish underground press.

== See also ==
- Copyright law in Poland
- Hate speech laws in Poland
- Internet in Poland#Internet censorship and surveillance
- Media of Poland
