= Kyi (mythology) =

Kyi (Polish: Kij [kʲij], Latin: !Qui) or Kvyi (Polish: Kwij [kvʲij]) is an alleged Polish god or mythical figure associated with smithery mentioned only in one source, the Postil of Koźmieńczyk. So far, only Leszek Kolankiewicz has undertaken the interpretation of this figure.

One should pay attention to those who say ungodly things today in dances or elsewhere in performances, consider unclean things in their hearts, shout out and mention the names of idols, and consider whether conversion to God the Father is possible. Certainly not. For it is forbidden to hear freely these holidays, which unfortunately celebrate according to what was left of the rites of the accursed pagans of our ancestors, unless for punishment, as once the shout of the inhabitants of Sodom and Gomorrah rose. For at this festival indecent exposure and other abominations, which the Apostle says should not even be named because of God the Father. However, because that preachers have arrived, such things cease, and in many places they have already ceased [...] There is no other name under heaven in which we can be saved. For a man is not saved in the name of Lado, Jassa, !Quia, Nyia, but in the name of Jesus Christ ... Not Lada, not Jassa, not Nija, which are the names of idols worshiped here in Poland, as some chronicles of Poles testify...

— Lucas of Wielki Koźmin, Sermon of Gniezno, around 1405–1412

== Etymology ==
The pan-Slavic word *kyjь (today "stick, cue, club") comes from word *kovati ("to forge") originally meaning "to beat". This noun used to mean not only "stick, club", but also "hammer" (cf. Old Church Slavonic: кꙑи/kyi "hammer", Serbo-Croatian: kij "hammer" (15th cent.), Lithuanian: kūjis "hammer"). From the word *kovati come such Polish words like kijanka "washing paddle", kuźnia "forge", kowadło "anvil", okowy "bonds", podkowa "horseshoe", kowal "blacksmith".

The Dictionary of Old Polish Personal Names notes the surname Kij from the 13th century, and the surnames Kijan, Kijanowic, Kijanowski, Kijko since the 14th century. The surnames Kijski, Kijowski, Kijański, Kije, Kijk, Kijec, Kijec(s)ki appear starting with the 15th century. The name Kij meant "the one who beats, forges" (cf Lithuanian: káuti "to beat, forge", Old High German: houwan "to hit", Celtic cuad "to beat").

== Interpretation ==
because that there is only one source listing this character and the lack of information about it in this source, possibilities for interpretation are limited. Kija could be alternation of Niya, but the fact that in the first enumeration of the Kija and Nyia are listed together speaks against this. Kyi mentioned by Koźmieńczyk may be somehow connected with the legendary Kyi – the ruler of Eastern Polans and the founder of Kyiv, mentioned in the Primary Chronicle (Długosz sees in the founder of Kyiv "one Polish pagan prince"), as well as with other characters with similar names, name donors for places with similar names to Kyiv, including hypothetically Kuyavia.

The name is associated with a certain archaic mythological complex, whose personification in Iranian mythology is Kaveh (from PIE. *kou̯ "to forge"), also known as Kobe. According to a message from the 10th century B.C. Kaveh was a blacksmith-hero who killed a three-headed dragon (Aži Dahaka) and founded the Kayanian dynasty, where the title of kings from this dynasty was Key or Kay (e.g. Kay Khosrow). Like Kaveh, before the founding of Kyiv, Kyi kills the dragon. A similar motif has been preserved in the Lesser Poland (where metallurgy had existed for several hundred years) legend about Krak from the 13th century, who, according to one version, also kills the dragon. Kyi could therefore be a mythical blacksmith, a dragon slayer.
