= Alexander Famintsyn =

Alexander Famitsin
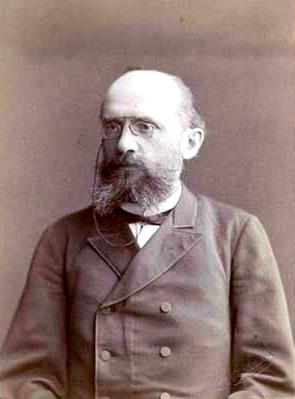
- Famitsin in 1896
- Born: Kalouga
- Died: 6 July 1896 (aged 54); St. Petersburg
- Occupations: musical writer; critic; composer; musicologist; professor

Alexander Sergeivich Famintsin (Russian: Александр Сергеевич Фаминцын) (also transliterated as Aleksandr S. Famincyn or Famintsyn) (1841-1896) was a Russian composer, critic, musicologist and scholar. He was one of the early faculty members of the renowned Saint Petersburg Conservatory. He was a pupil of Ignaz Moscheles, Moritz Hauptmann and Ernst Richter and friend of Alexander Serov.

== Life ==
Alexander Sergeivich, of aristocratic descent, was born at Kaluga, Oct. 24 (O.S.), 1841. His mother Wilhelmina Mestmacher was of German descent. He was educated in St. Petersburg, where he studied with Jean Vogt, and on leaving the university spent two years in Leipzig, where he studied theory under Hauptmann, Richter, and Moscheles.

On his return to Russia he was appointed professor of musical history and aesthetics at the newly opened Conservatoire. He also was secretary of the Russian Music Society.

He resigned from the conservatory in 1872, in order to devote himself to composition. As a music critic, he was known for his attacks upon the new national school of music. But he also covered other topics such as an article about the first production of Richard Wagner's Der Ring des Nibelungen at Bayreuth in 1876, which appeared in the Saint Petersburger Zeitung.

Apart from his musical and scholarly endeavors, Famintsin was one of the commission members in the declaration of independence of Ukrainian language in 1906.

== Works ==
=== Operas ===
Famitsin composed two operas: Sardanapalus, given in St. Petersburg in 1875, but with so little success that he made no effort to produce his second opera, Uriel Acosta. His instrumental works include three quartets, a pianoforte quintet, and a 'Russian Rhapsody' for violin and orchestra.

=== Books ===
Two books of 'Songs for Russian Children' have outlived his more ambitious attempts. As a musical historian he did his best work in the following publications:

- Russian Mummers and Gleemen (1889)
- The Ancient Indo-Chinese Scale in Europe and Asia (1889)
- Russian Folk-Songs (1890)
- The Gussies: a Russian National Instrument (1890)
- The Dombra and Kindred Instruments (1891)

He also translated Adolf Bernhard Marx's Allgemeine Musiklehre and Richter's Harmonielehre into Russian.

In addition to his books on music, he wrote several books about ancient Slavic culture.
