= Jean Vogt =

19th-century German composer

Jean Vogt (1823 in Tyniec Legnicki – 1888) was a German composer.

== Life ==
From 1850 to 1855, Vogt lived as organist and piano teacher in Saint Petersburg. Another stay abroad took him to New York City in 1871. From 1873, he was active again in Berlin.

Vogt's work was strongly influenced by the work of Felix Mendelssohn Bartholdy. He had success with his oratorio Lazarus as well as with several piano pieces.
