= Mater Verborum =

1240 Latin dictionary

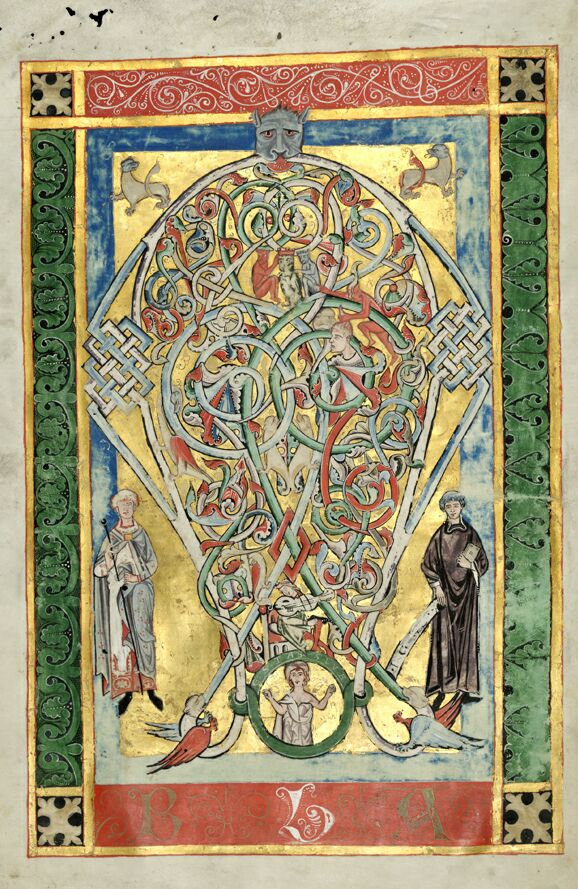
Title page of «Mater Verborum»

Mater Verborum (or Glosa Salomonis) is a medieval encyclopedical dictionary written in Latin language around 1240. The document is especially renowned for the more than 1000 comments written in it in the medieval Czech language. The manuscript is deposited in the Library of the National Museum (Prague), under signature X A 11.
