= Chronica Polonorum (1519) =

1519 book by Maciej Miechowita

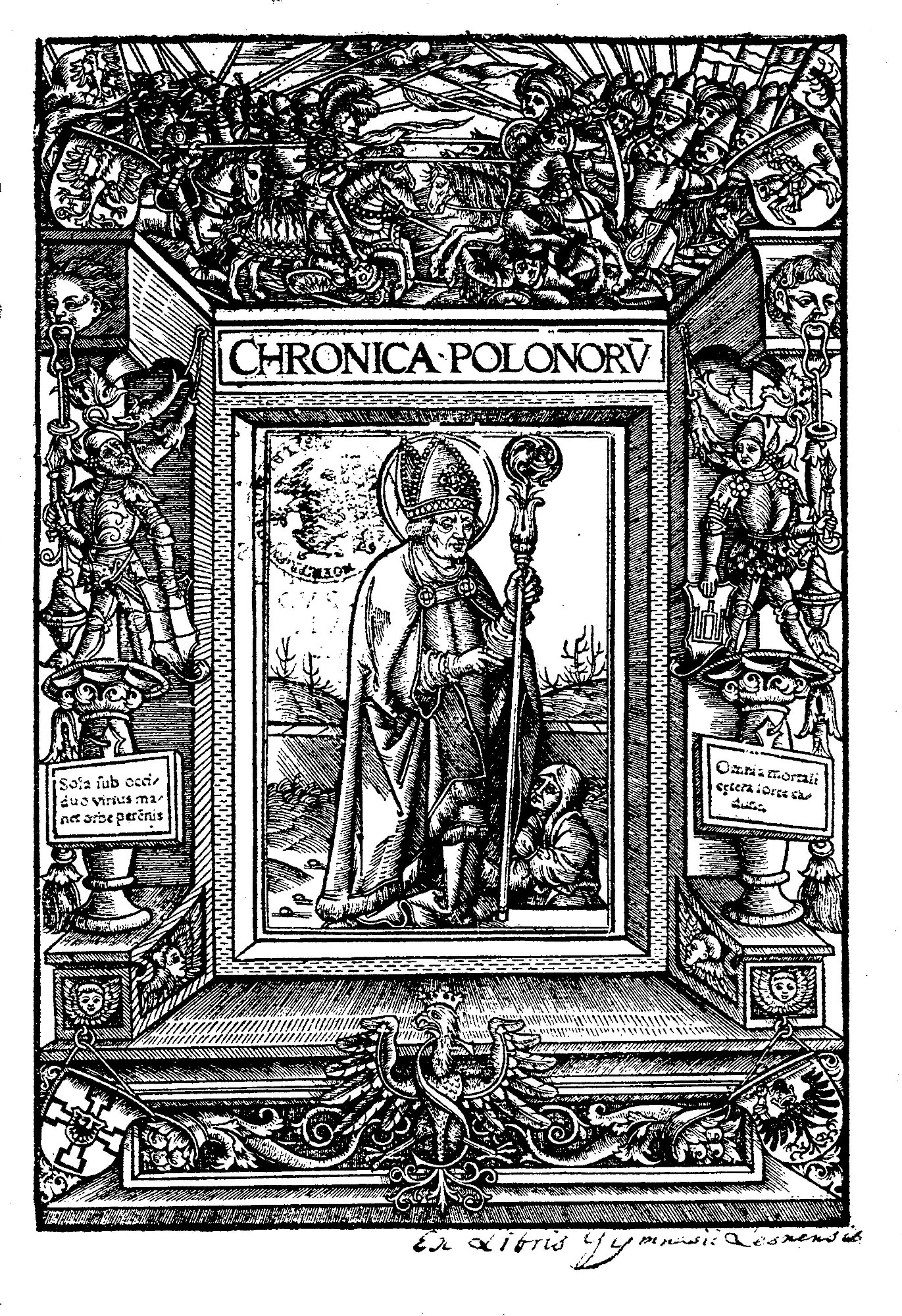
- Cover of second edition of Chronica Polonorum, 1521
- Author: Maciej Miechowita
- Language: Latin
- Subject: History of Poland
- Genre: History
- Publisher: Hieronim Wietor, Kraków
- Publication date: 1519, 1521
- Publication place: Poland

Chronica Polonorum (English: Chronicle of the Poles, Polish: Kronika polska) is a treatise about Polish history and geography written in Latin by a Polish renaissance scholar Maciej Miechowita, a professor of Jagiellonian University, historian, geographer, astrologer, and royal physician of king Sigismund I the Old. Chronica Polonorum was first published in 1519.

== Content ==
The Chronicle describes the history of Poland. It is based on the earlier work of Jan Długosz (Latin: Johannes Longinus), supplementing its content with the events leading to the accession of Sigismund the Old to the throne. Although the first edition of the Chronicle was published in 1519, it was confiscated by the authorities. As a result of the intervention of the Senate some passages have been removed, others deeply revised, because a number of nobles felt offended by the hostile description of their ancestors. The book was republished in 1521 without the offending passages about Jagiellons and the Primate Jan Łaski. The Chronicle by Miechowita became a seminal source of data used in the creation of further chronicles by Bernard Wapowski and Marcin Kromer, the author of De origine et rebus GESTIS Polonorum. Miechowita had his Chronica Polonorum republished by printer Hieronim Wietor of Kraków. A supplementary treaty in three volumes written by Ludwik Decjusz (Louis Decius) was added to it as De vetustatibus Polonorum liber I, De Iagellonum familia liber II, and De Sigismundi regis temporibus liber III.

== See also ==
- Chronica Polonorum by Wincenty Kadłubek
- Wielkopolska Chronicle (Chronica Poloniae maioris), anonymous
