= Vladimir Toporov =

Russian philologist (1928–2005)

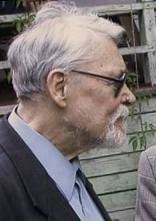
Vladimir Toporov

Vladimir Nikolayevich Toporov (Russian: Влади́мир Никола́евич Топоро́в; 5 July 1928 in Moscow – 5 December 2005 in Moscow) was a Russian philologist associated with the Tartu–Moscow Semiotic School. His wife was Tatyana Elizarenkova. He is also recognized as a prominent Balticist.

== Background ==
Toporov authored more than 1500 works, including Akhmatova and Dante (1972), Towards the Reconstruction of the Indo-European Rite (1982), Aeneas: a Man of Destiny (1993), Myth. Rite. Symbol. Image (1995), Holiness and Saints in the Russian Spiritual Culture (1998), and Petersburg Text of Russian Literature (2003). He translated the Dhammapada into Russian and supervised the ongoing edition of the most complete vocabulary of the Prussian language to date (5 volumes).

Among Toporov's many honours were the USSR State Prize (1990), which he turned down to voice his protest against the repressive January Events of the Soviet administration in Lithuania; the first ever Solzhenitsyn Prize (1998), and the Andrei Bely Prize for 2004. He was a member of the Russian Academy of Sciences and many other scholarly societies.
