= Alexander Guagnini =

Venetian-Polish historian (1538–1614)

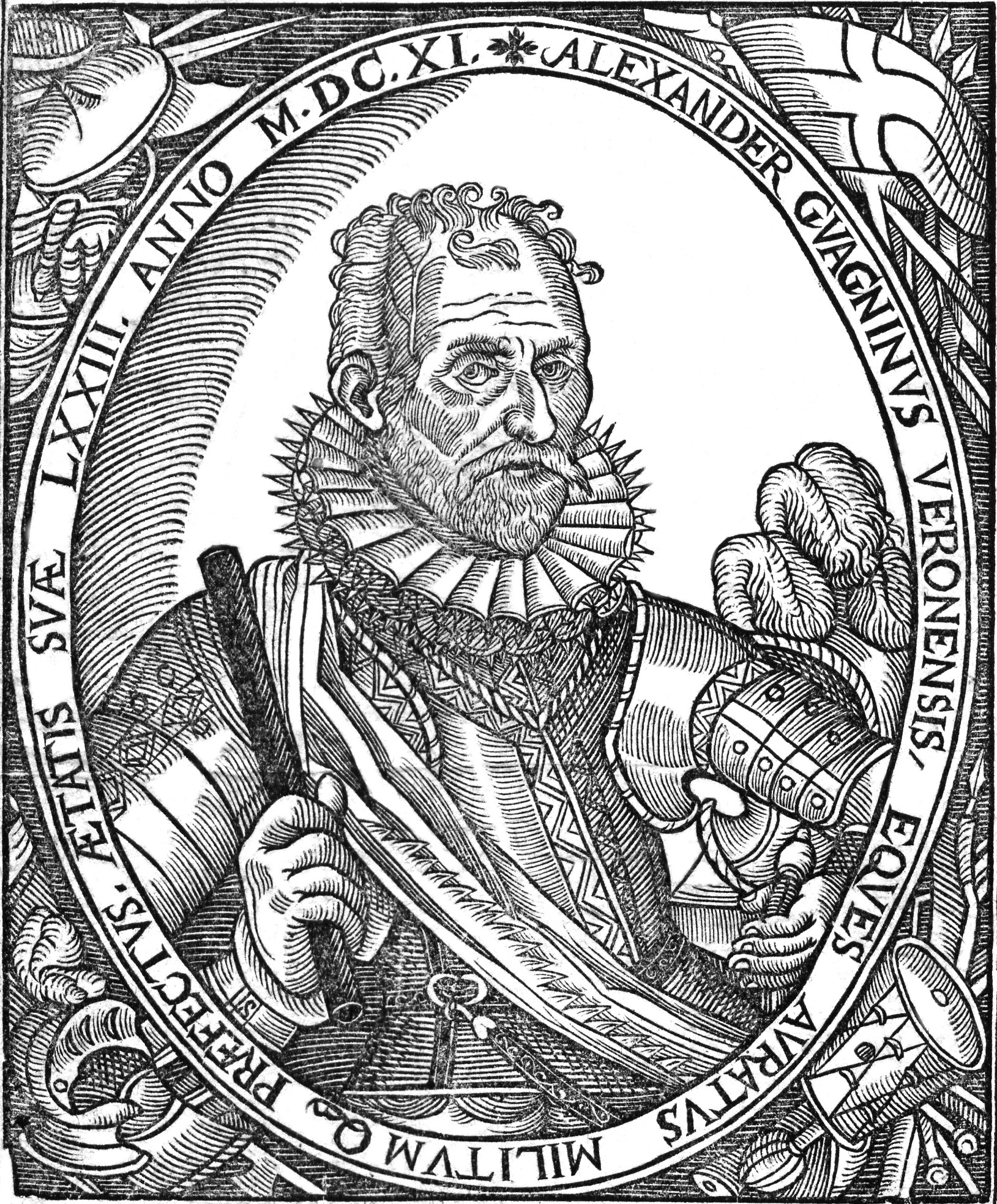
Gravure of Alessandro Guagnini out of his "Description..."

Coat of arms of Gwagnin

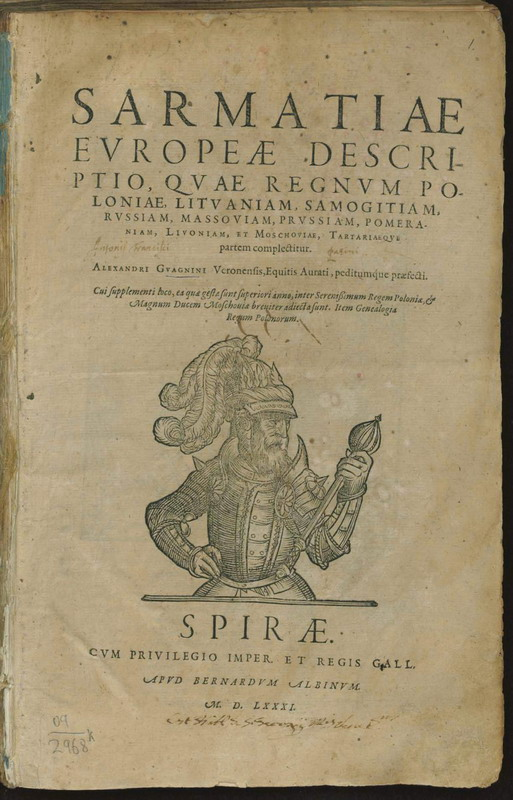
Title page of the Description of Sarmatian Europe, Spiræ 1581 (in Latin)

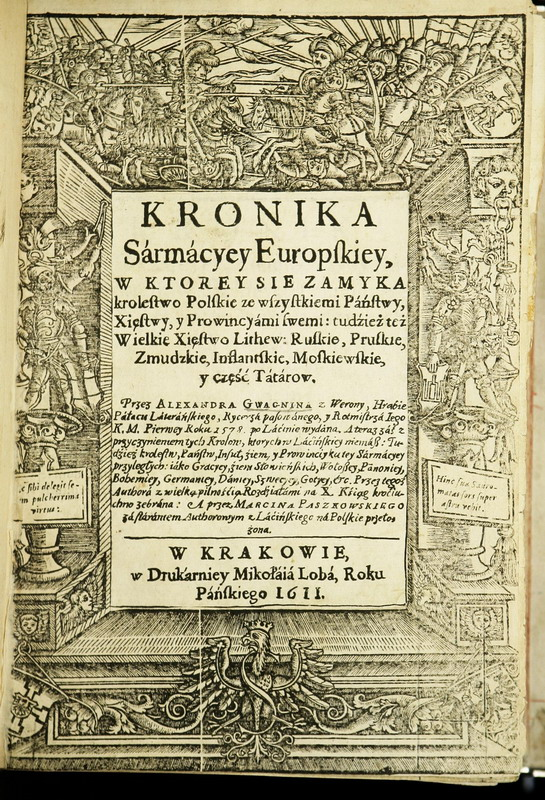
European Sarmatia Chronicles, Mikolaj Loba Printshop, Cracow, 1611 (in Polish)

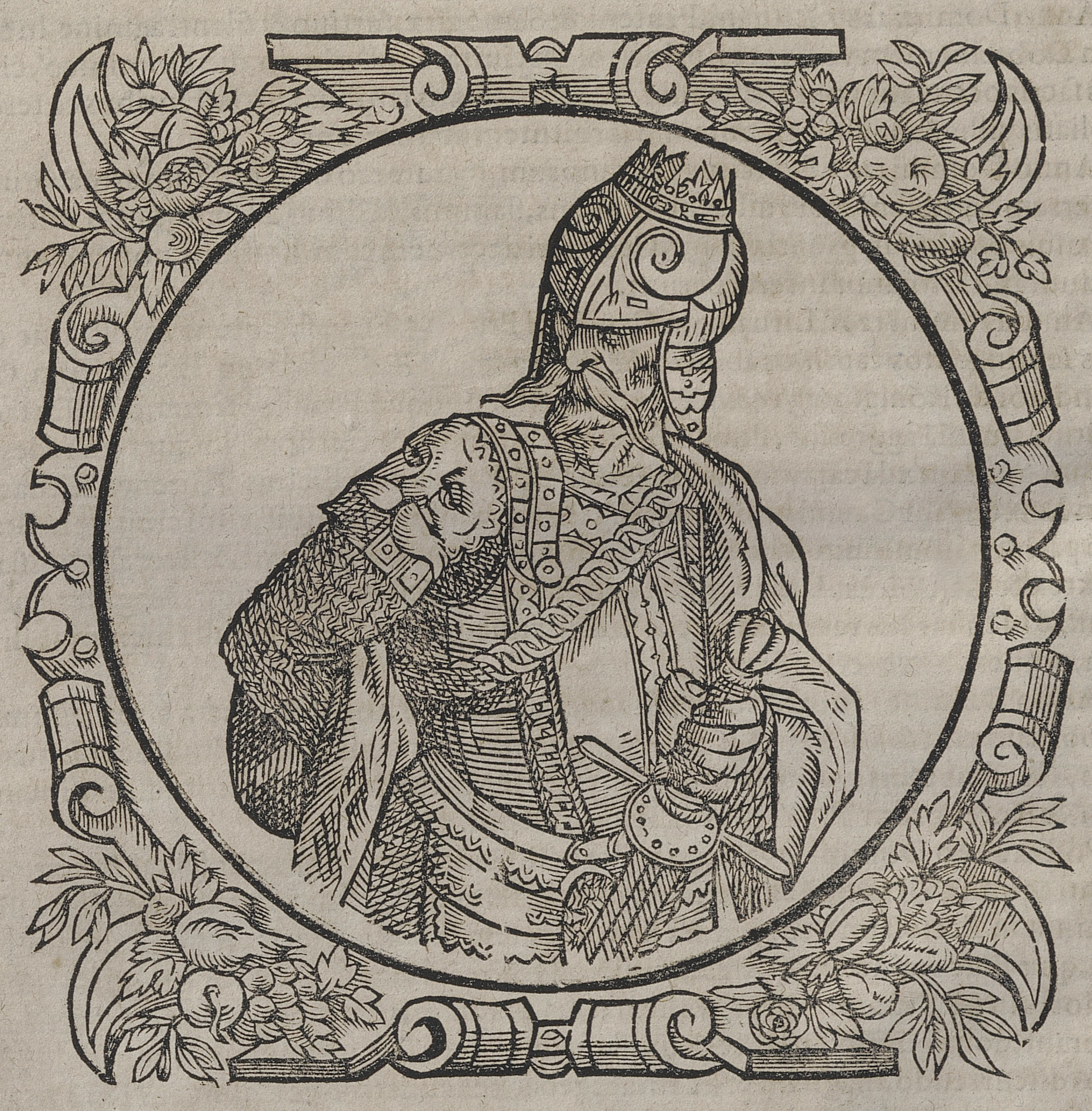
Portrait of Gediminas. The same image was used to illustrate Casimir III of Poland.

Alexander Guagnini (Polish: Alexander Gwagnin; Italian: Alessandro Guagnini dei Rizzoni; 1538, in Verona, Republic of Venice – 1614, in Kraków, Polish–Lithuanian Commonwealth) was a Venetian-born Polish writer, military officer, chronicler and historian of Italian heritage. He is known as a Crown Rotmistrz of Poland and Commandant of Vitebsk. Guagnini fought for the Polish–Lithuanian Commonwealth in the Livonian War and the Moldavian Magnate Wars.

Gwagnin is best known for his Latin work Sarmatiae Europeae descriptio, usually translated as Description of Sarmatian Europe, published in Kraków, 1578, which contained descriptions of the countries of Eastern Europe (history, geography, religion, traditions of Poland, Lithuania, Samogitia, Ruthenia, Masovia, Prussia, Pomerania).

Along with his father, Guagnini came to the Polish–Lithuanian Commonwealth during the Livonian War. (Note: Dyachok, 299) He spent almost his entire life in Poland and considered it his other Motherland and wrote about that in his Description of Sarmatian Europe. During his years of service Guanini was close to the Great Hetman Lithuanian and at the end of it he was closely connected with the court of Cracow Archbishop. He was referred in front of the Polish Sejm by the first persons of European states.

== Biography ==
=== Research ===
The earliest biographic information about Alexander Guagnini is recorded by Szymon Starowolski in his "Scriptorum Polonicorum εχατοντας" in 1622. (Note: Dyachok, 302) Later briefly Guagnini was mentioned by Franciszek Bohomolec in the fourth volume of his "Zbior dziejopisow polskich w czterych tomach zawarty" (Work collection of Polish chroniclers in four volumes). It is possible that the information about the Italian was based on the excerpt from the Szymon Starowolski's book.

A new source was introduced for the scientific circulation by Michał Wiszniewski in the mid 19th century, which was a recommendation letter of Russian voivode Mikołaj Sieniawski for Guagninis father and son to the King of Poland Sigismund Augustus dated 25 February 1561. (Note: Dyachok, 306) It contained the following phrase in Old Polish language, "Wloch z Werony pan Ambrozy, z szynem ssvym Alexandrem" (Italian out of Verona Mister Ambrosius with his son Alexander). In 1860 Kazimierz Józef Turowski published excerpts out of the "Description of Sarmatian Europe". In his brief article about life and works of the Italian he provides extended quotes of the Franciszek Bohomolec foreword to the 1768 edition. In 1887 Italian historian Carlo Cipolla published a big research "One Italian in Poland and in Sweden on the border of the 17th century. Biographic information" (Italian: Un Italiano nella Polonia e nella Svezia tra il XVI e il XVII secolo. Notizie biografiche). As a result of his search in archival storages of Venetia and Verona, the historian discovered unknown earlier sources to biography of his countryman. (Note: Dyachok, 303) Among other researchers about Guagnini was Polish author Antoni Pietkiewicz who edited the Guagnini's information in the Polish "Great General Illustrated Encyclopedia". In general, researchers were more interested in the issue of authorship of "Description of Sarmatian Europe".

With a turn of the 20th century, the interest in Guagnini has dissipated. In 1960 Włodzimierz Budka edited an article about the chronicler in "Polish biographic dictionary" adding few more interesting details that he found in the Cracow's Archives. Based on documents from the archives, Budka discovered facts a rector's court appeal of a translator Grzegorz Czaradzki in reference of not payment by the Italian an agreed sum of money as well as a court appeal of Guagnini himself against a publisher Mikolaj Loba. In 1967 another article about Guagnini was published by Polish historian Andrzej Wyrobisz who specializes in history of Polish glass production industry.

=== Outlook ===
Alessandro Guagnini is of Italian origin. He was born in the city of Verona which was indicated at the publishing of his work, in Latin as Alessandri Guagnini Veronensis and in Polish as Przez Alexandra Gwagnina z Werony. (Note: Dyachok, 308)

Mykola Kovalskyi pointed out that in literature could be met two dates of his birth. (Note: Dyachok, 309) One is 1534, while the other is mostly used 1538. Ukrainian writer Oksana Pakhlyovska, a daughter of a Polish writer Jerzy Jan Pachlowski, provided both dates in the "Ukrainian Literary Encyclopedia". The discrepancy could be solved after checking the Verona's archives that were found by professor Carlo Cipollo. According to them, the Guagnini family was quite famous and well respected in the city. Its representatives were members of the city council as early as the 15th century. His grandfather Ambrogio Guanini de'Rizzoni in 1529 aged 48 lived in Veronian district Ferrabo and had six children. The oldest son Ambrogio was 23 years old. During the 1541, census his age was recorded as 32 instead of 35. Along with him to the list was added a wife Bertholomea 33 y.o. and three children Francesca 9, Alessandro 7, and Clara 4. In 1545 census Alessandro is recorded as 11-year-old. Cipolla recalls also a list composed in 1555 where the age of the future chronicler is indicated as 20. It is probably could be explain that to the document was entered a number of full years. Regardless of it, Carlo Cipolla who entered in scientific circulation the mentioned sources argued that Guagnini was born in 1538. Some writers (i.e. Wiszniewski, Turowski, others) did not indicate his year of birth, but wrote that the chronicler died in 1614 at age 76.

Practically nothing is known about the childhood and adolescence of Alessandro. Possibly during that time he learned military engineering and military topography that became useful during his service in the Polish military. (Note: Dyachok, 310) Without referring to sources, S.Grzybowski, Julia Radziszewska and others were pointing to his skills in topography and map drawing. Military skills Allesandro, possibly, learned already in Poland from his father Ambrogio who, quoting the words of voivode Seniawski was "a person educated in knightly affairs". More than likely yet in Italy Guagnini learned Latin in which he was writing freely as well as adopted some humanistic ideas of Italian culture. Particularly his historic and geographical work is noted for its great tolerance towards people of other nationalities and religious background.

It is known that Ambrogio left Verona in 1555 along with his family. However, Alessandro stayed back for a couple of years, possibly due to his education. Gassenkamp shared a thought that Guagnini senior left for Poland where since 1548 ruled Sigismund the Augustus, a son of Italian who was sympathetic towards former countrymen of his mother. After being able to save up some money, by 1558 Ambrogio invited his son. Gassenkamp and Budka expressed a guess that the departure of Ambrogio could have been with political foundation. (Note: Dyachok, 311) Grounds for that was the exchange of letters between the King of Poland and the Herzog of Prussia during the winter of 1563 which included mentioning of Guagnini. Out of that Gassenkamp made a conclusion that before entering military service in Poland, Guagnini offered his service to Albrecht of Prussia.

In 1571 he received an indygenat (a type of naturalisation through adaptation of nobility) from the King of Poland. At that time Gwagnin also adapted his family coat of arms with a hedgehog (according to Włodzimierz Budka), (Note: Dyachok, 314) due to his official last name dei Rizzoni where riccio in Latin means hedgehog.

=== European Sarmatia Chronicles ===
Maciej Stryjkowski, who was his subordinate, alleged that Guagnini stole a manuscript of the Chronicle of Poland, Lithuania, Samogitia and all of Ruthenia from him and was not the author of the book. Stryjkowski protested before the Polish king and his claims were recognized in 1580, but the book continued to be printed under Guagnini's name and was translated into Polish. An expanded edition appeared in 1611.

The chronicle included portraits of Lithuanian dukes for the first time. Despite the images being purely fictional and having nothing to do with actual dukes, anachronistic clothes and weapons, and that some of the images illustrated multiple people, the portraits highly influenced future depictions of the grand dukes of Lithuania. To this day they remain the most popular portraits used in many history books.

Copies of the book are preserved, among other places, in the Vilnius University Library and in the Francis Skaryna Belarusian Library and Museum in London.
