= Maciej Stryjkowski =

Polish historian (c. 1547 – c. 1593)

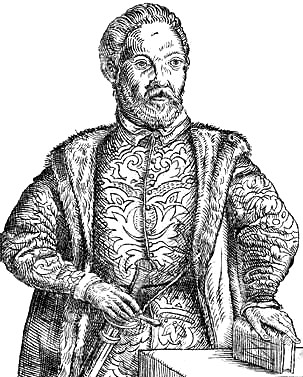
- Coat of arms: Leliwa
- Born: c. 1547; Stryków, Kingdom of Poland
- Died: c. 1593

Maciej Stryjkowski (also referred to as Strykowski and Strycovius; c. 1547 – c. 1593) was a Polish historian, writer and a poet, known as the author of Chronicle of Poland, Lithuania, Samogitia and all of Ruthenia (1582). The work is generally considered to be the first printed book on the history of the Grand Duchy of Lithuania.

== Biography ==
Maciej Stryjkowski was born around 1547 in Stryków, a town in the Rawa Voivodeship in the Kingdom of Poland. He graduated from a local school in the town of Brzeziny, after which he joined the Grand Ducal Lithuanian Army. He served in a garrison in Vitebsk under Alexander Guagnini.

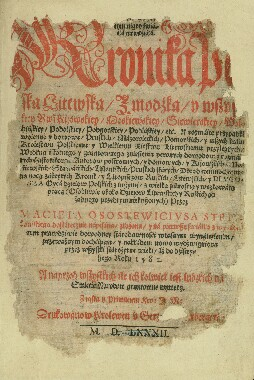
Title page of Stryjkowski's Chronicle...

He was a Pole, but spent most of his life in the Grand Duchy, initially as a soldier. Around 1573, at the age of roughly 25, he retired from active service and became a protégé of Merkelis Giedraitis, the bishop of Samogitia. Eventually, Stryjkowski became a Catholic priest and ended as a provost at the parish of Jurbarkas near the Lithuania–Prussia border. There he devoted his life to writing a monumental chronicle of the lands of Poland–Lithuania, eventually published in Königsberg (today Kaliningrad) in 1582. The book, published under the title of Chronicle of Poland, Lithuania, Samogitia, and all of Ruthenia of Kiev, Moscow, Novgorod... (Note: The full title of the book in contemporary Polish language was long Kronika Polska, Litewska, Żmódzka y wszystkiej Rusi Kijowskiey, Moskiewskiey, Siewierskiey(...) y rozmaite przypadki woienne y domowe, pruskich, mazowieckich, pomorskich y inszych krain Królestwu Polskiemu y Wielkiemu Xięstwu Litewskiemu przyległych(...) and included all of the lands of mediaeval Ruthenia listed separately, as well as a short explanation of sources used. Because of that, it is usually referred to by its opening names only.) is a classic piece of literature written in the Polish language and detailed much of the history of the Polish–Lithuanian Commonwealth and its parts from their legendary roots up to 1581. Some fragments of his work are written in the Lithuanian language. He also encouraged Lithuanian nobility to use the Lithuanian language.

The chronicle was a successful compilation of earlier chronicles by Jan Długosz and Maciej Miechowita, but also includes Ruthenian chronicles, folk tales and legends. It instantly gained much fame among the szlachta (nobility) and it is often argued that Stryjkowski was among the Polish–Lithuanian writers to shape the Lithuanian national identity, as his works were later copied by scores of writers and chroniclers in all parts of the region. Until the 19th century, the works of Stryjkowski were considered to be the basic sources of information on early period of history of the Grand Duchy of Lithuania. It was not until the advent of modern historiography that his chronicle started to be criticised and disputed, mainly due to his favour of the magnates, lack of distinction between legends and historic accounts and his theory on the Roman origin of the Lithuanian ruling families.

Stryjkowski's Chronicle introduced the idea of historical succession between Kiev, Galicia–Volhynia and Lithuania as an alternative to the Rurikid scheme, according to which the Kievan heritage was claimed by Moscow.

In 1577, Stryjkowski also authored an epic poem On the beginnings of the famed nation of Lithuania (...), (Note: As in the case of his chronicle, the full title was O początkach, wywodach, dzielnościach, sprawach rycerskich i domowych sławnego narodu litewskiego, żemojdzkiego i ruskiego, przed tym nigdy od żadnego ani kuszone, ani opisane, z natchnienia Bożego a uprzejmie pilnego doświadczenia, which could be roughly translated as On the beginnings, accounts, virtues, marital and domestic affairs of the famed nations of Lithuania, Samogitia, Ruthenia; never before touched or described by anyone, put down out of God's inspiration and own experience.) which however was not published until after Stryjkowski's death. He died around the year 1593, though the exact date and place remain unknown.
