= Marcin Bielski =

Polish writer and historian (1495–1575)

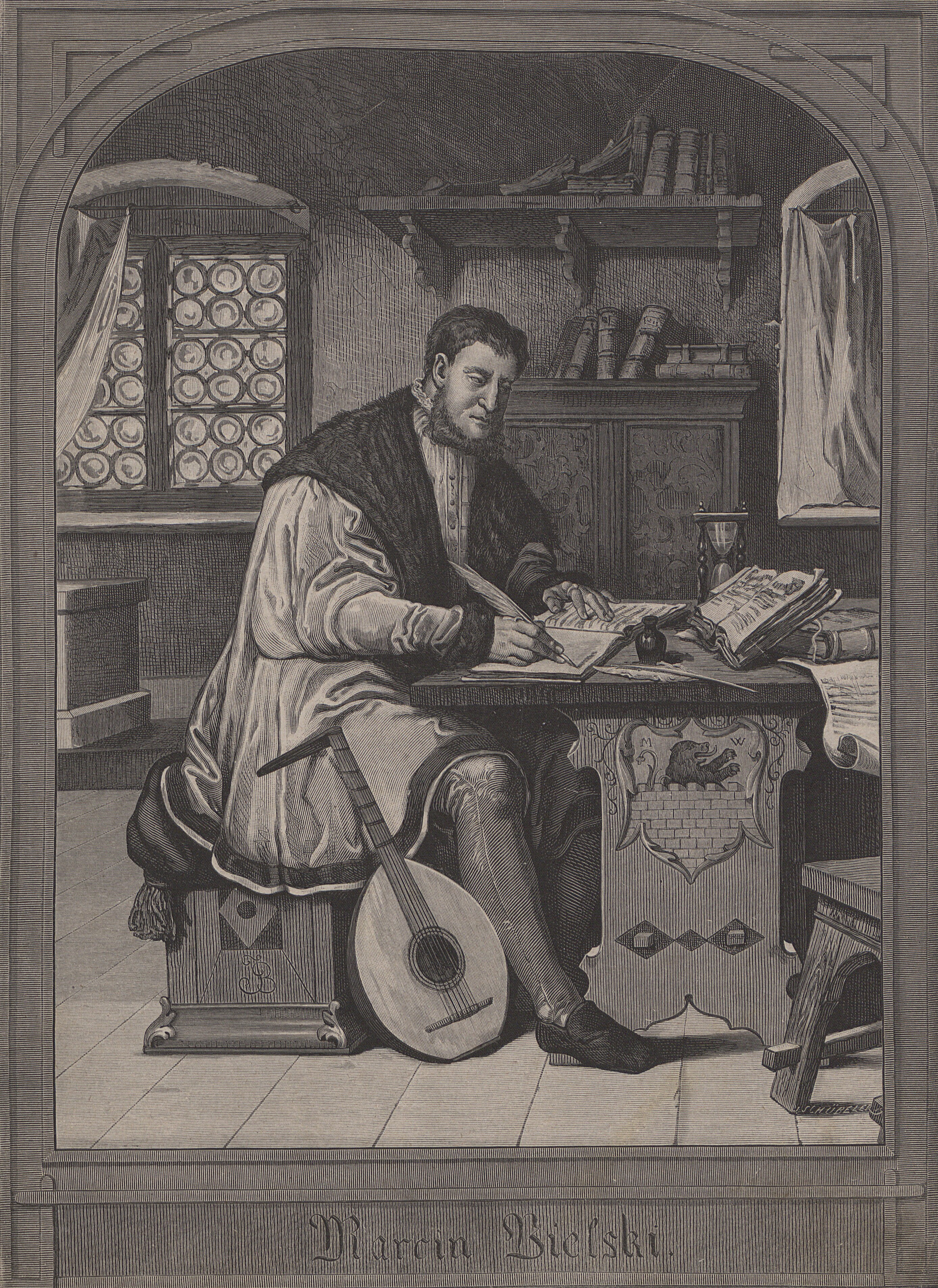
Marcin Bielski

Marcin Bielski (or Wolski; 1495 – 18 December 1575) was a Polish soldier, historian, chronicler, renaissance satirical poet, writer and translator. His son, Joachim Bielski, royal secretary to king Sigismund III Vasa, was also a historian and poet.

He was born of noble parentage on the patrimonial estate of Biała (whence the family name), Pajęczno County, in the Polish province of Sieradz. His alternate surname Wolski derives from his estate at Wola.

One of two Polish writers of the same name, he was the first to use the Polish language, hence his designation as the father of Polish prose.

== Life ==
Bielski was educated at the University of Kraków, founded by Casimir the Great in 1364, and spent some time with the military governor of that city. He served in the army in the wars against the Wallachians and Tatars, and participated in the Battle of Obertyn (Galicia) in 1531.

He was the author of several works, including:

- Zywoty Filozofów (Lives of the Philosophers, 1535)
- Kronika Swiata (Universal Chronicle, 1550–64), from the earliest time down to his day, divided into six periods. This was the first important universal history published in the national idiom, and the first attempt at a comprehensive history of Poland, from 550 to 1580; in the second edition (1554) there is a reference to America. After the author's death the work was continued, rearranged, and brought down to the year 1597, under the title of Kronika Polska (Chronicle of Poland) by his son Joachim (b. 1540; d. 1599), secretary to King Sigismund III
- Sprawa Rycerskiego, a treatise on military art (1569), according to the Greek science of warfare, in eight parts. It contains valuable data about the Polish army and kindred subjects.

After Bielski's death, several satirical poems by him were published:

- Seym Majowy (The May Diet, 1590), descriptive of the degradation of Hungary, and an appeal to his countrymen to emulate a higher standard of life
- Seym Niewiesci, (Woman's Council, 1586–95), analytical of the then existing political conditions in Poland
- Sen Maiowy (Dream of a Hermit, 1586)
- Komedia Justina y Konstanciey (Comedy of Justinian and Constantia, 1557)
