= Aleksander Gieysztor =

Polish historian

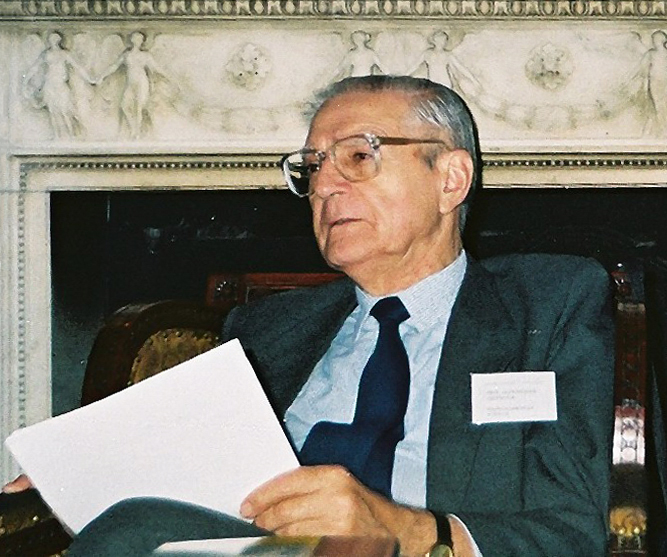
Aleksander Gieysztor, 1995

Aleksander Gieysztor (17 July 1916 – 9 February 1999) was a Polish medievalist historian.

== Life ==
Aleksander Gieysztor was born to a Polish family in Moscow, Russia, where his father worked as a railwayman. In 1921, the family relocated to Poland and settled in Warsaw. He graduated in history from the University of Warsaw in 1937.

He was married to Irena Gieysztor née Czarnecka, a fellow historian.

The Aleksander Gieysztor Prize of the Kronenberg Foundation and the Aleksander Gieysztor Academy of Humanities are named after him.

== Awards ==
- 1944: Silver Cross of the Order Virtuti Militari
- 1961: Legion d'Honneur
- 1980: The Order of Merit of the Federal Republic of Germany
- 1994: Order of the White Eagle
- 1993: Commander's Cross with Star of the Order of Polonia Restituta
- 1999: The Commander's Cross of the Order of Merit of the Italian Republic

== Books ==
- Historia Polski (co-author; 1947)
- Ze studiów nad genezą wypraw krzyżowych (1948)
- Zarys nauk pomocniczych historii (1948), a textbook used by a lot of generations of Polish students
- Zarys dziejów pisma łacińskiego (1972)
- Zamek Królewski w Warszawie (1973)
- Mitologia Słowian (1982) (wyd. Wydawnictwa Artystyczne i Filmowe, 1982 i 1986, w serii * Mitologie Świata, ISBN 83-221-0152-X).
- Dzieje Mazowsza do 1526 roku (co-author Henryk Samsonowicz)
- La Pologne et l’Europe au Moyen Age. Warszawa, P.W.N. Conférence au Centre Scientifique Parisien de l’Académie Polonaise des Sciences le 10 décembre 1962.
- Società e cultura nell’alto Medioevo Polacco. Ossolineum 1965. Conférence à l’Académie Polonaise des Sciences à Rome le 5 novembre 1963.

== See also ==
- List of Poles
