= Maciej Miechowita =

Polish scholar (1457–1523)

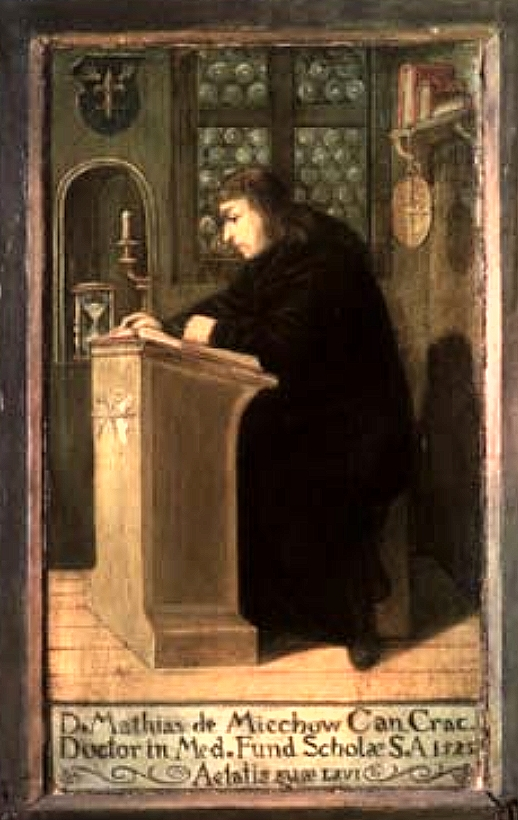
Maciej Miechowita

Maciej Miechowita (also known as Maciej z Miechowa, Maciej of Miechów, Maciej Karpiga, Matthias de Miechow; 1457 – 8 September 1523) was a Polish Renaissance scholar, professor of Jagiellonian University, historian, chronicler, geographer, medical doctor (royal physician of king Sigismund I the Old of Poland), alchemist, astrologer and canon in Kraków.

== Life ==
He studied at the Jagiellonian University (also known as the Cracow Academy), obtaining his master's degree in 1479. Between 1480 and 1485 he studied abroad. Upon his return to the country, he became a professor at the Jagiellonian University, where he served as a rector eight times (1501–1519), and also twice as a deputy chancellor of the Academia. He lived in the Długosz House from 1514 to 1516.

His Tractatus de duabus Sarmatiis ("Treatise on the Two Sarmatias") is considered the first accurate geographical and ethnographical description of Eastern Europe. It provided the first systematic description of the lands between the Vistula, the Don and the Caspian Sea. This work also repeated after Jan Długosz and popularised abroad the myth of Sarmatism: that Polish nobility (szlachta) are descendants from the ancient Sarmatians. Miechowita suggested that the szlachta had a right to the eastern part of the territory historically inhabited by the Sarmatians, namely Moscow, which he presented as the junior partner, or "younger brother", of Poland. It was also "the first European treatise to overtly challenge the existence of the Riphean mountains". Miechowita stated: "We know for certain and have seen that the Hyperborean, Riphean, and Alan mountains do not exist".

His Chronica Polonorum ("Polish Chronicle") is the developed, larger treaty about Polish history and geography. Contra pestem sevam regimen and Conservatio sanitatis are his two printed medical treaties, about how to combat epidemics and on benefit of sanitation.

He has also written other works, many of which appeared only in manuscripts and were not printed during his lifetime, like his biography of Saint John Cantius.

== Selected works ==
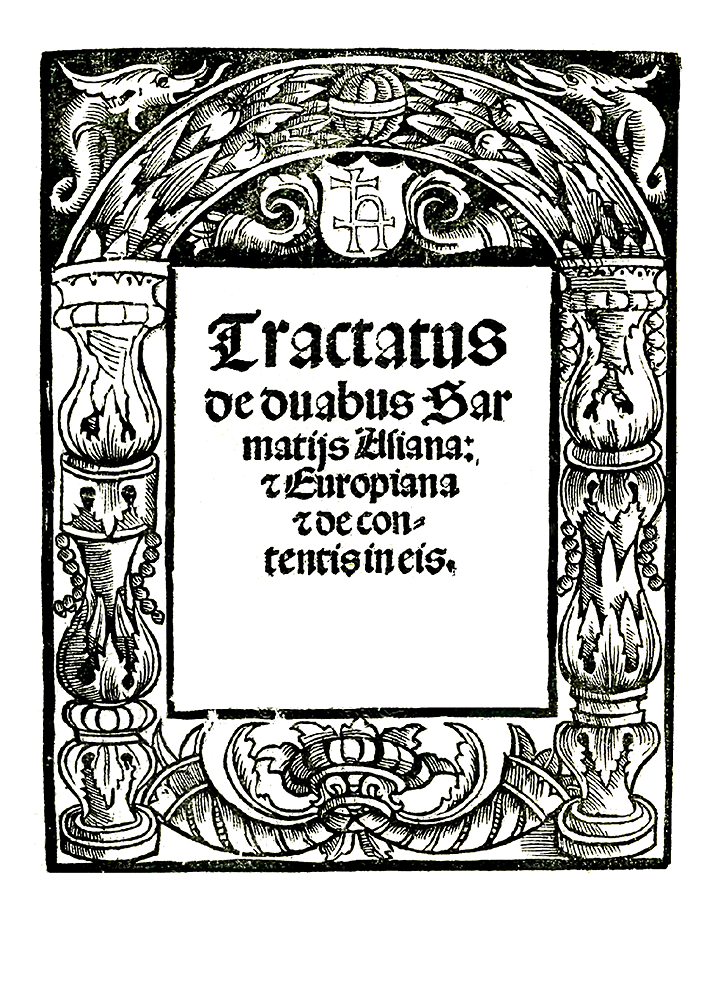
Title page of the first edition of Miechowita's Tractatus de duabus Sarmatiis

- Contra pestem sevam regimen, print. 1508;
- De sanguinis missione, print. 1508;
- Conservatio sanitatis, print. 1512;
- Tractatus de duabus Sarmatiis Europiana et Asiana et de contentis in eis, print. 1517;
- Chronica Polonorum, print. 1919, 1921.

== See also ==
- List of Catholic clergy scientists

== Sources ==
- Akopyan, Ovanes (1 January 2020). "Europe or Not? Early Sixteenth-Century European Descriptions of Muscovy and the Russian Responses". In Detering, Nicolas; Marsico, Clementina; Walser-Bürgler, Isabella (eds.). Contesting Europe: Comparative Perspectives on Early Modern Discourses on Europe, 1400–1800. BRILL. pp. 248–271. doi:10.1163/9789004414716_013.
