= *Seh₂ul and *Meh₁not =

Proto-Indo-European Sun and Moon deities

*Seh₂ul
- Sun deity
- Abode: Sky
- Planet: Sun
- Symbol: Chariot, solar disk
- Day: Sunday

Equivalents
- Albanian: Dielli
- Celtic: Sulis
- Etruscan: Usil
- Greek: Helios
- Hindu: Surya
- Norse: Sól
- Roman: Sol
- Hittite: UTU-liya
- Lithuanian: Saulė
- Zoroastrian: Hvare-khshaeta
- Germanic: Sowilō

*Seh₂ul and *Meh₁not are the reconstructed Proto-Indo-European Sun deity and Moon deity respectively. *Seh₂ul is reconstructed based on the solar deities of the attested Indo-European mythologies, although their gender (male or female) is disputed, since there are deities of both genders. Likewise, *Meh₁not- is reconstructed based on the lunar deities of the daughter languages, but they differ in regard to their gender.

The daily course of *Seh₂ul across the sky on a horse-driven chariot is a common motif among Indo-European myths. (Note: On a related note, the Pahlavi Bundahishn narrates that creator Ohrmazd fashioned the sun "whose horses were swift.") (Note: Nijolė Laurinkienė cites that the imagery is present in South Slavic: Serbian songs mention that the Sun (Сунце) rides a horse-driven vehicle, dives into the sea and rises out of the water.) While it is probably inherited, the motif certainly appeared after the introduction of the wheel in the Pontic–Caspian steppe about 3500 BC, and is therefore a late addition to Proto-Indo-European culture.

== The Sun deity ==
=== Reflexes ===
The existence of a Proto-Indo-European sun deity can be postulated on the basis of its possible reflexes throughout Indo-European cultures. In Greek mythology, the name of the god Helios is etymologically connectable with other Indo-European words for the Sun. However, another notable solar deity in ancient Greek religion was Apollo, a god whose name is possibly of Pre-Greek origin. Nevertheless, the term Phoebus—an epithet of Apollo—has been connected with Sanskrit bhaga, though it is considered by the linguist Robert Beekes to be unexplained. Similarly, the Romans borrowed Apollo as a sun deity, in spite of their preexisting sun god Sol, whose name also is connectable with the Indo-European word for "Sun." In Albanian paganism, the Sun—worshiped as the god of light, sky and weather, giver of life, health and energy, and all-seeing eye—is referred to as Dielli, a name that is considered to have been a word taboo originally meaning "yellow, golden, bright or shiny one" used to refer to the Sun due to its perceived sacred nature. Another parallel in another Indo-European culture may be drawn from Zoroastrian Hvare-khshaeta.

There are two separate solar deities in Vedic mythology: Surya and Savitr—the latter of which described with the pseudonym Prthupáni ("with the wide hand"), a title that may relate to the epithet Lamfáda ("of the long arm"), which is ascribed to the Irish god Lugh. Via the migration of Indic peoples, the sun Indo-European god may have spread to other cultures. Kassite inscriptions include mention of a name Šur(i)yaš-, which may have been borrowed from an Indo-Aryan language. The name of the Near Eastern prince Šuwardata, who is mentioned in Amarna Letters, may parallel the Sanskrit name Sūryadatta and is perhaps of Indo-Aryan origin. In Vedic Sanskrit, the term raví ("रवि"), which also refers to the Sun god, is cognate with Old Armenian arew ("արև")—both of which are, according to the linguist Hrach Martirosyan, derived from Indo-European or Armeno-Aryan "poetic language." Moreover, Martirosyan considers the original Proto-Indo-European word for the Sun—which he reconstructs as *seh₂ul—was "profane," and therefore was replaced by a poetic term that eventually produced arew in Armenian.

=== Genealogy ===
The Vedic Sun deity Surya is stated to be the son of the sky deity Dyaus and the mother goddess Aditi. Likewise, in Slavic paganism, the sun god Dazibogu was described at the offspring of the sky deity Svarog. It is possible that, in the original Proto-Indo-European mythology, the sun god was also conceptualized as the child of the sky god *Dyḗws. In the Homeric Hymn to Helios, his mother—Euryphaessa—is described with the epithet "βοῶπις," ("boôpis") meaning "ox-eyed." According to the Italian linguist Enrico Campanile, the name of Greek Euryphaessa may relate to the Proto-Indo-European root *bʰeh₂- ("to shine"), which also surfaces in certain epithets of the Vedic and Greek dawn goddesses, such as the term "vibhātī́" ("विभा॒ती," "shiny"), an epithet of Ushas. If this comparison is accepted, then it may indicate that the sun god was originally the offspring of the dawn goddess.

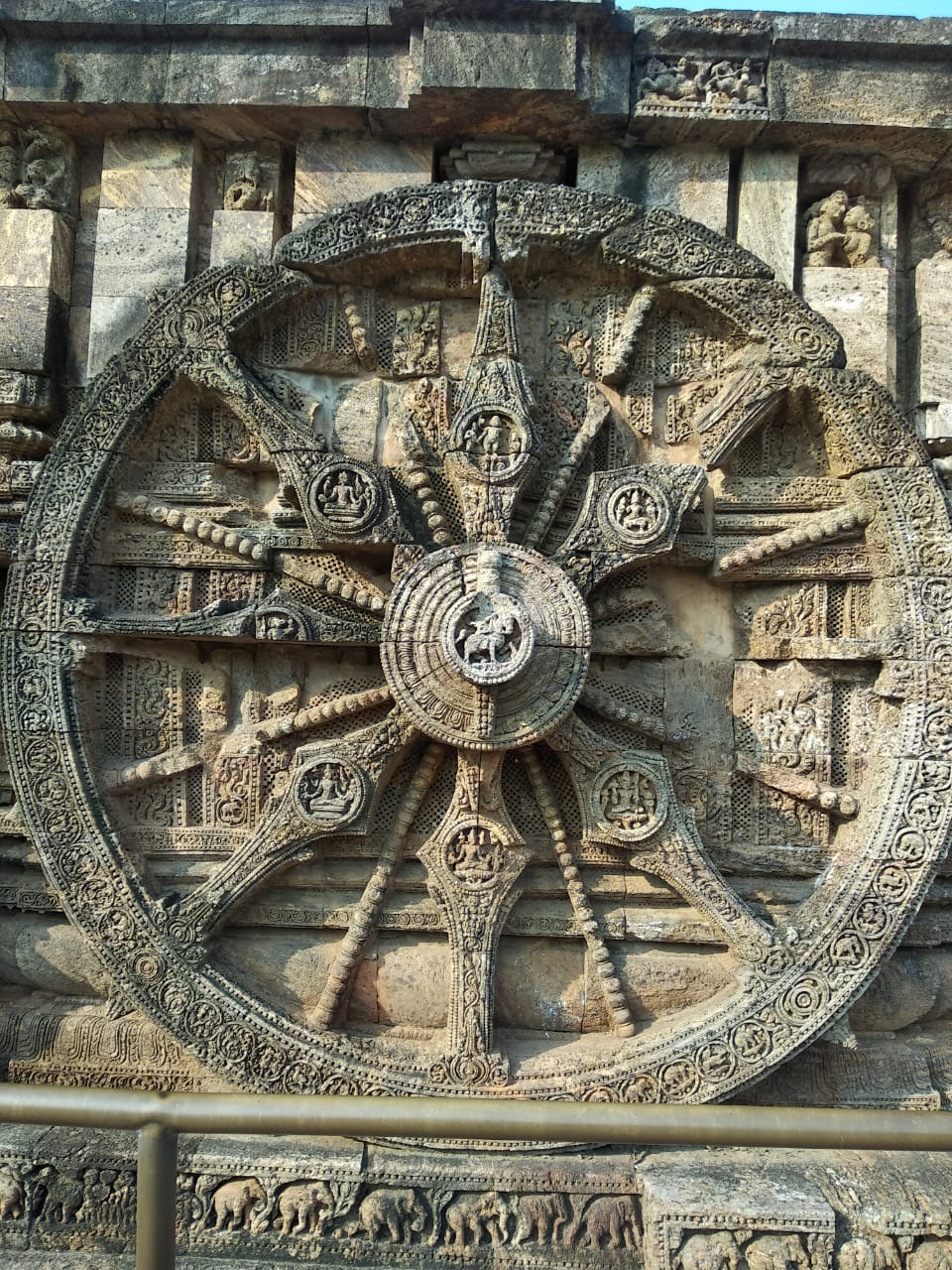
Detail of a chariot wheel at the Konark Sun Temple

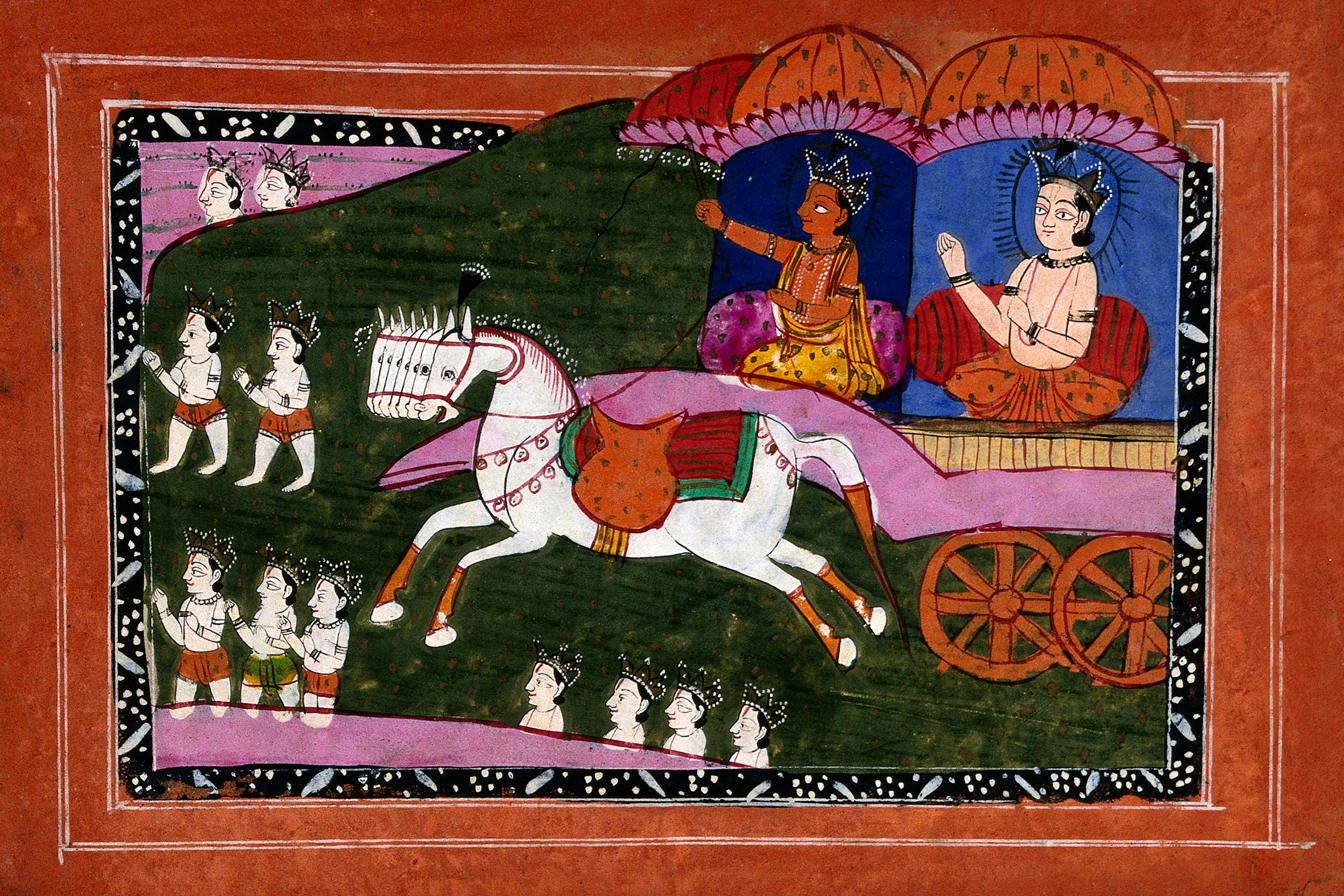
The Sun god Surya driving a chariot

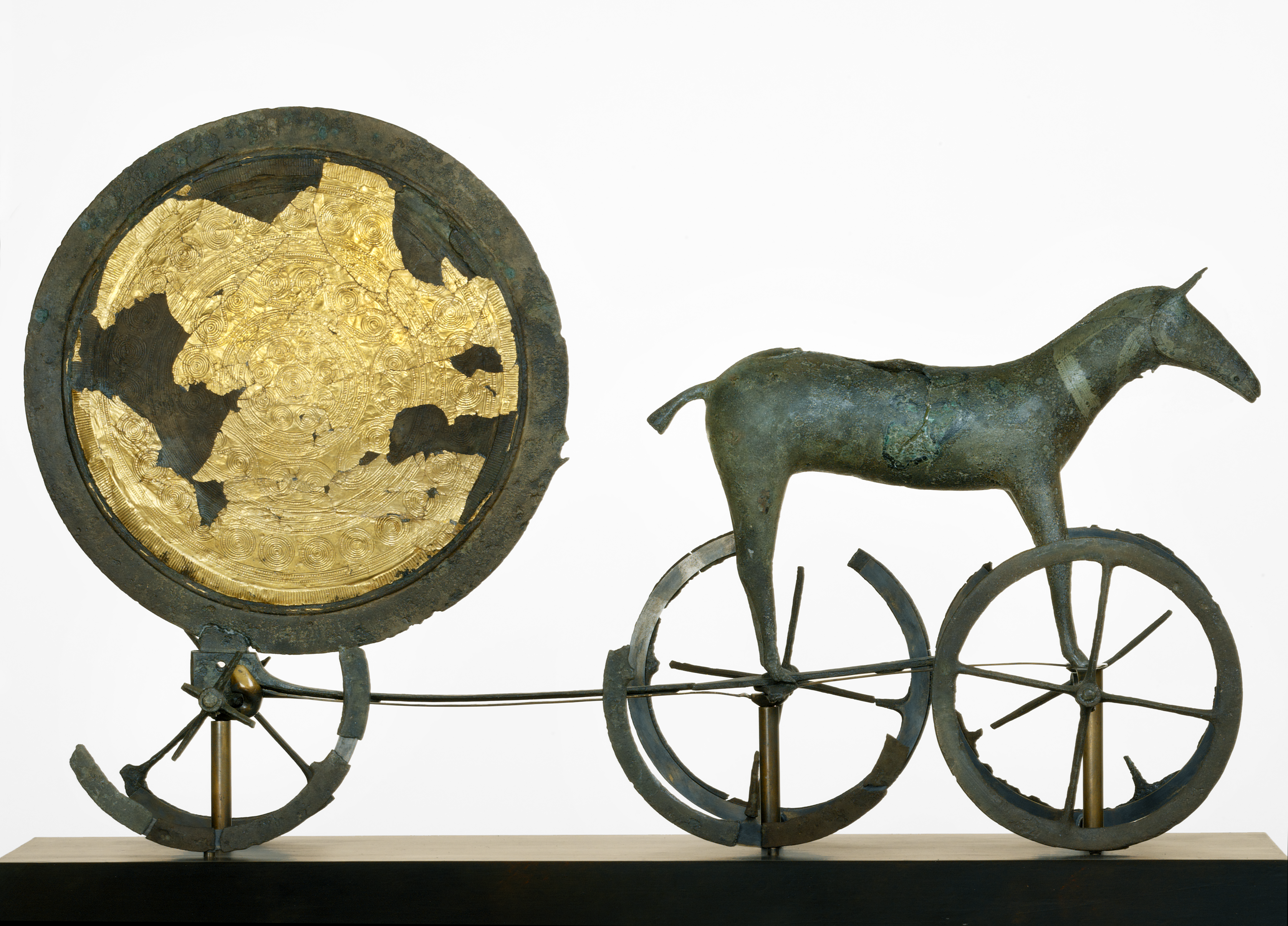
The Trundholm sun chariot, an artifact from Late Bronze Age Denmark that perhaps represents the Proto-Indo-European myth of a Sun chariot.

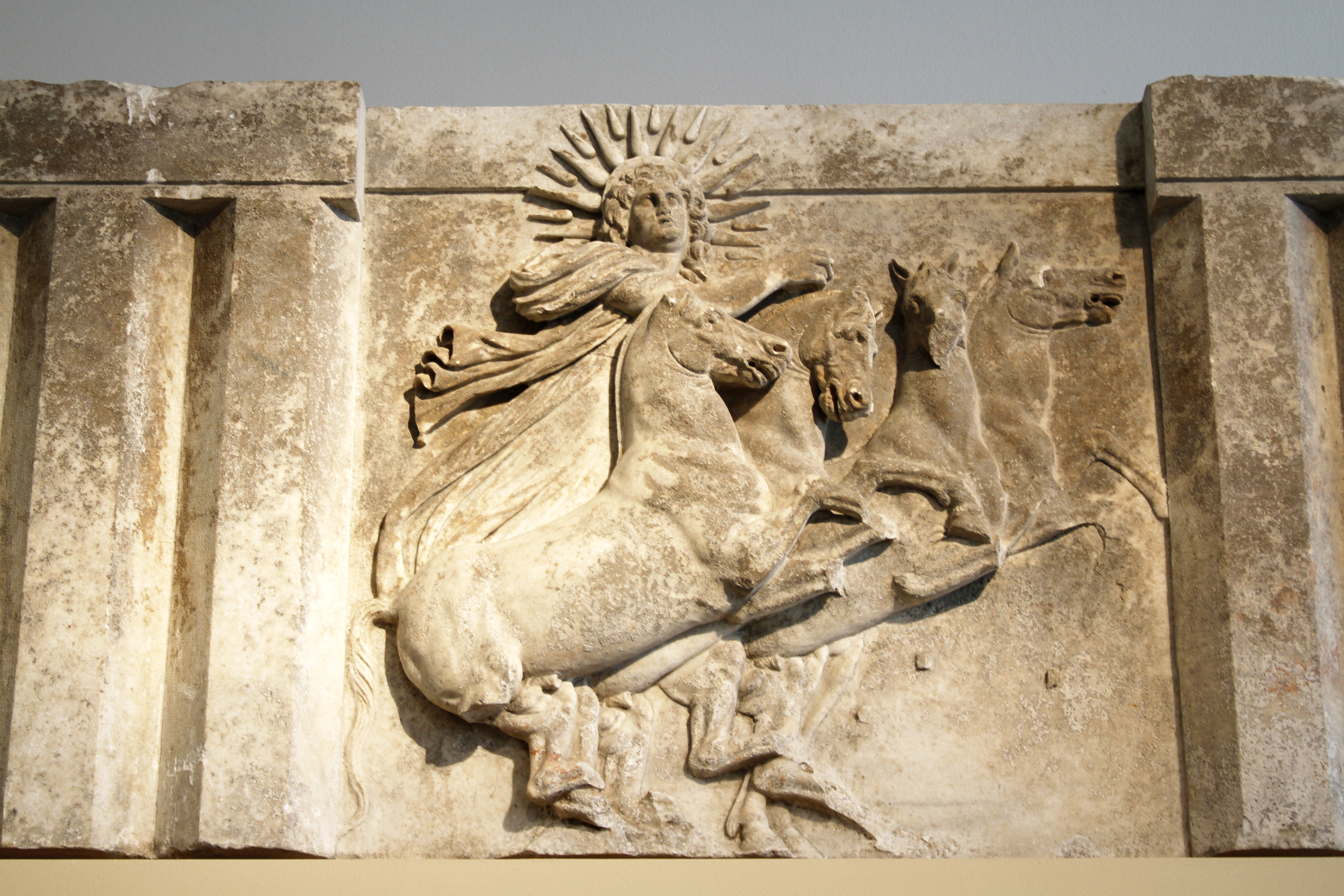
Depiction of the Greek god Helios riding his chariot

=== Horses of the Sun ===
In the mythologies of the daughter languages (namely, Baltic, Greek and Old Indic), the sun deity crosses the sky in a horse-driven chariot or wagon. For instance, in Norse mythology, the chariot of the Sun god is driven by the two horses Árvakr and Alsviðr. Ovid, a 1st-century BCE Roman poet, lists several "swift" ("volucres") horses "of the Sun" ("Solis equi") that pull the chariot of Helios, namely Pyrois, Eous, Aethon, and Phlegon. In the Rigveda, it is stated that the Surya is pulled across the sky "in a moment speed" by "auspicious" and "bay-colored" horses. Similarly, the Latvian god Ūsiņš and the Lithuanian Sun goddess Saule both had chariots that were pulled across the sky by two white horses. However, Mallory and Adams caution that the motif is not exclusively Indo-European, and mention evidence of its presence in Mesopotamia.

In Vedic mythology, the storm deity Indra is stated to have attacked the dawn and crashed the sun chariot. According to the Indo-Europeanist Nicholas Kazanas, this Indian story may connect to the Greco-Roman myth of Phaethon, in which the Greek mythological figure accidentally drove the sun chariot too close to the Earth, resulting in the lightning god Zeus striking him down. In further support of the connection, Kazanas notes that the name "Phaethon" ("Φαέθων," "Phaéthōn") was also applied to a horse of the dawn goddess Eos and—in the works of Homer—to the Sun itself.

Both Sanskrit and Greek writings describe the Sun as traveling with great speed. Mimnermus, a 7th-century BCE Greek poet, writes about the "swift Sun" ("ὠκέος Ἠελίοιο," "ōkéos Ēelíoio"), and the Atharvaveda likewise mentions a "swift Sun" ("आशुम् सूर्यम्," "āśúm sū́ryam"). Both of the terms utilized in the Greek and Vedic texts derive from Proto-Indo-European *HéHḱus ("quick") and *sóh₂wl̥ ("Sun") respectively. Poets in Hellenic and Indo-Iranian cultures tended to describe the Sun as traversing the sky untired or unwearied. In the Rig Veda, it is stated that the Sun and the moon "unweariedly ("ájasra") maintain their brightness." Similarly, in the Iliad, the Sun is associated with the adjective "ἀκάμας" ("akámas"), meaning "untiring."

Rigvedic scriptures mention the sun deity Savitr following a "great path" ("म॒होअज्मस्य," "mahó ájmasya"), while the Homeric Hymn to Selene depicts the moon goddess also traversing a "great path" ("μέγας ὄγμος," "mégas ógmos"). The term utilized to describe these occurrences in their respective languages both descend from the Proto-Indo-European words "*méǵh₂s" and "*h₂óǵmos." According to Matasović, the Proto-Indo-European people may have conceptualized a heaven-like afterlife existing at the end of the Sun's path. Matasović notes that the Ancient Greek term ὄλβος ("ólbos," "bliss") may derive from Proto-Indo-European *su(h₂)-ol-gʷh₂o- ("that which goes towards the Sun") and is perhaps related to Sanskrit svargá ("स्वर्ग," "paradise"). Beekes, however, suggests a possible Pre-Greek origin for the word ὄλβος.

=== Light of the Sun god ===
Although the sun was personified as an independent deity, the Proto-Indo-Europeans also visualized the sun as the "lamp of *Dyēus," as seen in various reflexes. For instance, the 5th-century BCE Athenian playwright Euripides references "the god's lamp ("λαμπὰς ... θεοῦ," "λαμπὰς ... θεοῦ") in his play Medea and mentions "rays of the Sun" ("ἀελίου ... λαμπάσιν," "aelíou ... lampásin") in the play Ion. Numerous kennings describing the Sun appear throughout Old English literature. In Beowulf, reference is made to "heaven's candle" ("rodores candel") and a "world's candle" ("woruldcandel"). The poem Andreas, another piece of Anglo-Saxon writing, mentions two separate "sky's candles" ("heofancandel" and "wedercandel"), while the poem Battle of Brunanburh mentions a "lamp of the lord God" ("Godes candel"). In a Hittite prayer, the Sun-goddess of Arinna is also called "the land of Hatti's torch." Both the Vedic sun god Savitr and the Greek god Helios are described as lighting up the world for its inhabitants. In the Rigveda, it is stated that Savitr raises "his banner" and produces "light for all the world of creatures." Similarly, in the Odyssey, it is stated that Helios leaves "the beauteous water surface" and "sprang up into the brazen heaven to give light to the immortals and to mortal men on the earth."

=== All-seeing Sun god ===
==== Eye of the Sun ====
References to the "eye of the Sun" in the Rigveda

As thou, Dawn, hast caused Agni to be kindled, and with the Sun's eye hast revealed creation.

— Rigveda. 1.113.9

with floods of rain they make the Sun's eye fade away.

— Rigveda. 5.59.5

Thine is this world of flocks and herds around thee, which with the eye of Surya thou beholdest

— Rigveda. 7.98.6

The Sun with his dear eye beholds that quarter of the heavens which priests Have placed within the sacred cell.

— Rigveda. 9.10.9

May Surya's eye with days and nights endow him, and ever may his light spread out before him

— Rigveda. 10.10.9

In Greek mythology, Helios is referred to as the eye of Zeus, while in Zoroastrian religion Hvare-khshaeta is described as the eye of Ahura Mazda. According to the 5th-century BCE Roman author Macrobius, the "ancients" ("antiquitas") referred to the Sun as the "eye of Jupiter" ("Iovis oculum"). Another Roman author, Ovid, portrays the Sun god referring to himself as "the world's eye" ("mundi oculus"), he "who beholds all things" ("omnia qui video"), and the one through whom "the earth beholds all things" ("per quem videt omnia tellus"). Likewise, the Rigveda describes the god Surya as the "eye of Mitra and Varuna" ("mitrásya váruṇasya cákṣase"). In the play Electra by the 5th-century BCE Athenian playwright Euripides, the Sun is connected with the title "gold-visaged" ("χρυσωπός," "khrusōpós"), Such a description parallels the epithet "golden-eyed" ("हि॒र॒ण्या॒क्षः," "hiraṇyākṣá"), which is utilized in the Rigveda to describe the god Savitr.

Ferdowsi, a 10th-century CE Persian poet, also details a myth involving the character of Goshtasp, in which it is stated that a tree provided "such thick shade" that it could conceal "the eye of the Sun." Furthermore,Yazidis refer to the sun as "the eye of Şêşims" (çehvê Şêşims). Albanian solemn oaths are taken "by the eye of the Sun" (për sy të Diellit), which is related to the Sky-God worship (Zojz). Further connections possibly derive from a segment in the play Thesmophoriazusae by Aristophanes, in which the character of Euripides describes a creation myth in which Aether is stated to have created the eye according to the "image of the solar disc" ("ἀντίμιμον ἡλίου τροχῷ").

In Old Norse poetry, the phrase "ennis sólir," meaning "Suns of the forehead," is utilized as a kenning to describe eyes. The names of Celtic sun goddesses such as Sulis and Grian may also allude to this association: the words for "eye" and "sun" are switched in these languages, hence the name of the deities. In one Scots Gaelic folksong recorded by the folklorist Alexander Carmichael in the 19th-century, the Sun is described as the "eye of great God" ("sùil Dhé mhóir"). The term utilized to designate "God" within this verse is descended from Proto-Indo-European *deywós, which is itself related to the name of the sky god *Dyḗws. The Old Armenian word for the Sun, aregakn ("արեգակն"), may be a compound of the word areg ("արեգ," "Sun") and "akn" ("ակն," "eye"). Additionally, the 5th-century CE Classical Armenian historian Movses Khorenatsi recounts a supposedly ancient hymn to the mythical hero Vahagn, at the end of which it is stated that "his eyes were Suns."

==== The Sun as cosmic overseer ====
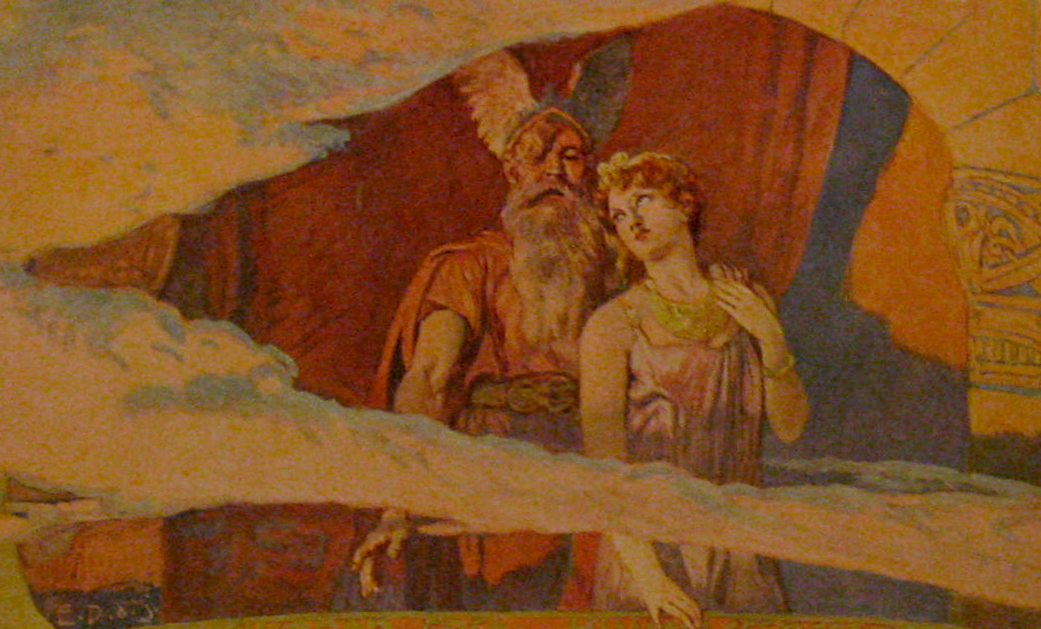
1905 depiction by Emil Doepler of Wodan and Frigg observing the Earth from the Heavens

In a Rigvedic poem—the Sun is described as he who "beholds ("स्पशम्," "spáśam") the universe." Within Germanic literature—more specifically, within the Old English poem Phoenix—it is stated that the Sun "surveys the world" ("woruld geondwlīteð"). Similarly, the Latvian sun goddess Saule is described—in the dainas—as witnessing all the occurs in the world. According to the religious scholar Jiří Dynda, the notion of the Sun protecting and observing the world may be reflected in the terms Lithuanian and Latvian terms pasáulis and pasaule, both of mean "world" and morphologically are composed of elements meaning "under" and "the Sun." Similarly, various words in Slavic languages meaning "Sun" derive from Proto-Slavic *světъ ("light, world"), which itself derives from Proto-Indo-European *ḱweyt- ("to shine").

The historian Peter Jackson notes that—in a Homeric hymn to a Demeter—the Sun is described as "the watcher ("σκοπός," "skopós") of gods and men." It is not clear, however, whether these attributes were originally associated with the sun deity or other gods. Amongst the Greeks, the sky god Zeus was also identified an all-seeing deity. Hesiod, and 8th-7th century BCE poet, writes that the eye of Zeus "sees all things and knows all things" and that "thrice ten thousand are Zeus's immortal guardians of mortal human beings" who watch over "judgments and cruel deeds." It is perhaps possible that the Zeus assumed the role as divine watcher as his prominence grew within Hellenic religion.

The Vedic sky god Dyaus is not ascribed the same quantity of spies associated with his Greek counterpart Zeus. Dyaus is perhaps ascribed the epithet "all-knowing" ("विश्ववेदसे," "viśvavedase"), though the translator William Dwight Whitney notes that the passage has also been interpreted as referencing the root √vid- ("to find, acquire") instead of the homophonic root √vid- ("to know"), both of which were likely once the exact same word. In Rigvedic tradition, the god Varuna is, however, stated to possess a "thousand eyes." Moreover, Varuna is connected with the epithet "viśvávedāḥ" ("वि॒श्ववे॑दा॒," "all-knowing") and "urucákṣasam" ("wide of eye"), the latter of which may parallel the Avestan epithet "vaōurucašānē" ("wide of eye"), which is ascribed to the god Ahura Mazda. The motif of spies resurfaces in the Avesta, where the god Mithra is described as possessing "one thousand ears" and is said to spy "with ten thousand (eyes)." The 8th-century Benedictine monk Paulus Diaconus recounts a Lombardic myth in which the god Wodan favors a legendary tribe called the Winnili in battle because they were the first side that he saw at sunrise. It is perhaps possible that this myth could reflect an Indo-European tradition of a sky god as a divine observer, as Odin may have assumed several of the characteristics of *Dyḗws during the development of Germanic mythology.

==== The Sun god and oaths ====
The idea of the Sun as a universal overseer may have motivated a belief that operated as a protective deity. Within the Rigveda, Surya is described as watching the "deeds of men both good and evil" and "guardian of all things fixt, of all that moveth." Heraclitus, a late 6th or early 5th-century BCE Greek philosopher, writes that "the sun will not overstep his measures ("δίκης," "díkēs")." This statement parallels a Vedic verse in which it is claimed that "Surya transgresses not the ordered limits ("दिशा," "díśaḥ")." The terms utilized in each passage to describe the boundaries are cognate, both deriving from *deyḱ-. In various Indo-European cultures, the Sun god is repeatedly summoned to watch over an oath or vow, a divine role that may have emerged from their connection to justice and their omniscient nature. In Luwian culture, the Sun-god Tiwaz is entitled "Tiwaz of the oath" ("ḫīrutallis ^{d}UTU-waza"), though his name is etymologically linked to the Proto-Indo-European sky deity *Dyḗws. The same "Tiwaz of the oath" surfaces in another Luwian inscription of the Kuwattalla tradition, in which the divinity is connected with the verb ḫīrutalli- ("to perjure"), perhaps—according to the philologist Alice Mouton—indicating a belief that the Sun-god functioned as a witness to perjury. Within this same inscription, the god Tiwaz is described supervising a ritual alongside the Heaven and the Earth. Amongst the Romans, oaths were governed by the god Dius Fidius, whose name is also etymologically related to the Proto-Indo-European sky god. In the Atlakviða, a poem from the Poetic Edda, the character of Gudrun notes that another individual, Atli, had "often sworn oaths" by "the south-slanting Sun." There is evidence that, in another Germanic society, the Franks, oaths were still sworn by the Sun, even following Christianization. The Vita Sancti Eligii, a hagiography detailing the life of Saint Eligius, recounts an anecdote in which Eligius himself had advised the Franks that, for their own salvation, that "none should call the sun or moon lord or swear by them."

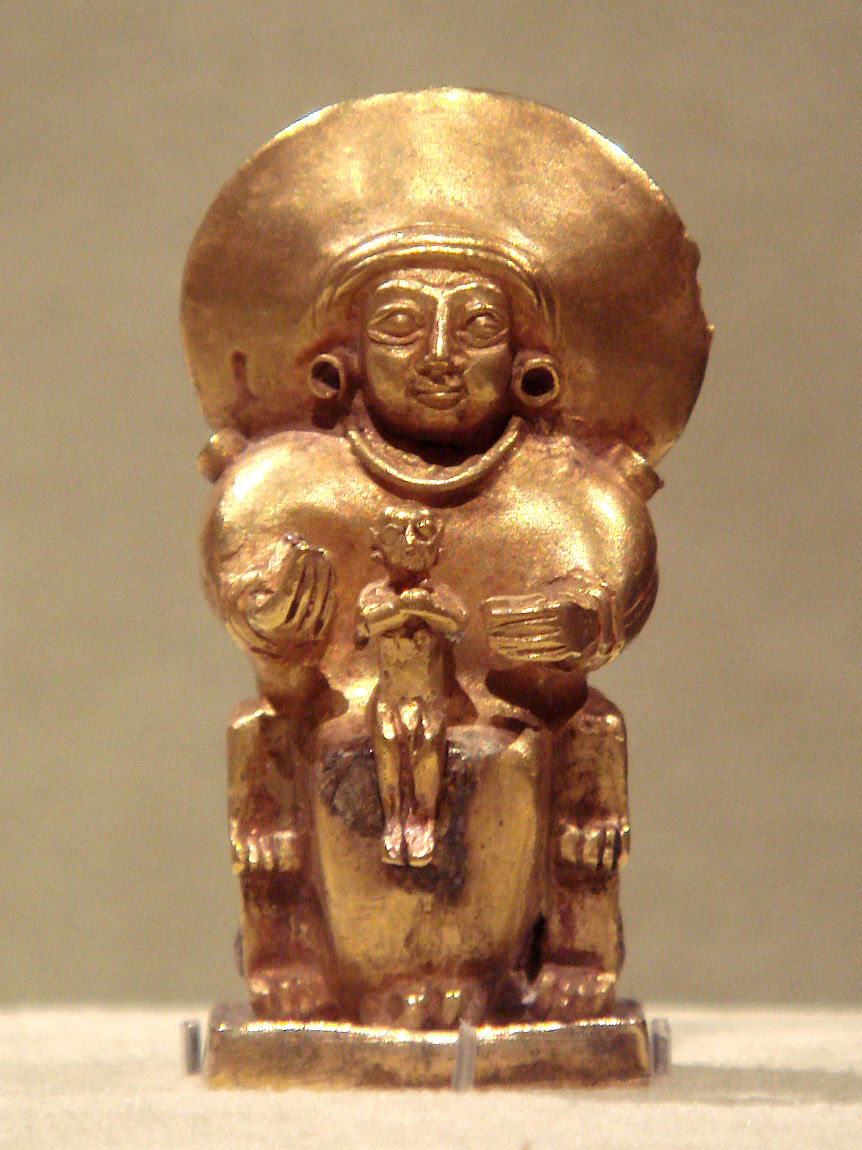
Possible depiction of the Hittite Sun goddess holding a child in her arms from between 1400 and 1200 BC.

=== Gender ===
The original Proto-Indo-European term for the Sun may be reflected in the Luwian neuter noun še-ḫu-wa-a-a[l]—perhaps alternatively read as ši-wa-a-al—which likely meant something akin to "lamp" or "brazier." According to West, it is unlikely that a word for "Sun" would have been reutilized to describe lamps, thereby implying the converse—that the term originally meant "lamp" and was repurposed to describe the Sun. When the term came to refer to the personified Sun deity, it naturally acquired gender connotations. The philologist Ranko Matasović proposes that Proto-Indo-European likely identified both the sun and the sun god with a masculine noun *seh₂wōl, whereas the concept of sunshine was communicated utilized a separate neuter noun *sh₂wor. Likewise, in Sanskrit, the generic noun meaning "Sun, light" is the neuter form svàr ("स्वर्"), whereas the derivative referring to the Sun god is a masculine proper noun Sū́rya ("सूर्य").

The majority of Indo-European sun deities were male, although the sun goddesses Saulė, Sól, and *Sowilō were propitiated in Baltic, North Germanic, and Continental Germanic mythology respectively. Otherwise, in Celtic mythology, the name of the goddess Sulis may also be etymologically related to Old Irish feminine noun súil ("eye"), which itself may derive from the Proto-Indo-European word for "Sun." According to the philologist Martin Litchfield West, the majority of female Sun deities in Indo-European mythologies are concentrated throughout Northern Europe, perhaps implying a common substrate affecting this area of the Indo-European world. The original Proto-Indo-European sun god may have persisted into Hittite mythology as a male Sun god named Šiušummi, who was possibly worshipped in later periods under the name Ištanu, whose name was perhaps borrowed from the Hattian deity Eštanu. However, the Assyriologist Charles Steitler argues that such an interpretation is contradicted by the general adoption of the same Hattic divinity and the Hittite Sun goddess of Arinna, who is possibly of non-Indo-European origin. In Luwian culture, the Sun goddess of the Earth is attested with the name tiyammaššiš, a name which is likely etymologically connected to the name of Tiwaz, who was himself likely inherited from Proto-Indo-European mythology.

=== Connection with cattle ===
Associations between cattle and the sun surface throughout Greek and Indo-Iranian mythology: The Bundahishn describes the death of the primordial bovine and its own wailing at its fate, while in the Odyssey the sacred cows of Helios are butchered and cry out upon their deaths. These stories may reflect a shared tradition, although it is alternatively possible the sacrifice of the cattle of Helios continues a separate Indo-European "cattle-raiding" myth, which is perhaps paralleled by the Irish story of Táin Bó Cúailnge and the Indic legend of Indra recovering cattle stolen by the Panis. Due to the significant differences between each individual tale, it is likely that rather than preserving the same ancestral myth, they instead reflect a similar "cattle-raiding" theme that permeates Indo-European cultures. Other connections between cattle and the Sun god appear throughout the Rigveda. For instance, the god Surya is described milking the cattle of heaven and earth. Furthermore, in a Rigvedic wedding hymn, two steers ("गावौ॑," "gā́vau") are tied to the chariot of Surya. During this same wedding procession, two bulls are sacrificed under the constellation Agha, perhaps—according to the philologists Tamaz Gamkrelidze and Vyacheslav Ivanov—reflecting a ritual connected with the Sun.

=== Sun-maiden ===
A character related to the Sun deity is the 'Sun-maiden'. Examples are Saules meita, the daughter of Saulé in Baltic tradition, and Sūryā, who is varyingly depicted as either the daughter of Surya or Savitr. Scholars also posit Helen of Troy, from Greek mythology, was another example of the 'Sun-maiden'. Just as Helen, in Greek mythology, was associated with the twin horsemen Castor and Pollux, the Vedic deity Sūryā is connected with the Ashvins, a pair of twin charioteers. However, the linguist Vittore Pisani argues that Helen is more likely to etymologically connect to the Vedic goddess saraṇyú. In one Baltic myth, the goddess Saules meita is wed to the Dieva Dēli, who are the twin sons of the sky god Dievs, It is possible that this Baltic pair of twin gods derives from the Indo-European "divine twins" archetype, which is itself possibly further continued by the Ashvins. In another Baltic myth, the goddess Saules meita is instead married to the moon god Meness, with the Dieva Dēli only appearing as members of the bridal procession.

In Albanian tradition there is E Bija e Hënës dhe e Diellit, "the daughter of the Moon and the Sun", who is a light divine heroine, referred to as pika e qiellit ("drop of the sky" or "lightning"), which falls everywhere from heaven on the mountains and the valleys and strikes pride and evil. She defeats the kulshedra, the archetype of darkness and evil in Albanian mythology. In some Albanian traditions the Sun (Dielli) and the Moon (Hëna) are regarded as husband and wife, and in others as brother and sister. In the case of E Bija e Hënës dhe e Diellit the Sun is her father and the Moon is her mother.

== The Moon deity ==
*Meh₁not
- Moon deity
- Abode: Sky
- Planet: Moon
- Day: Monday

Equivalents
- Albanian: Hëna
- Greek: Mene (Selene)
- Roman: Luna
- Slavic: Myesyats
- Hittite: Kašku
- Phrygian: Men
- Zoroastrian: Mah
- Latvian: Mēness
- Germanic: Máni

*Meh₁not- is reconstructed based on the Norse god Máni, the Slavic god Myesyats, (Note: In Ukrainian myth, like in Baltic tradition, the moon, Myesyats, is a male god and said to marry the Sun goddess.) and the Lithuanian god *Meno, or Mėnuo (Mėnulis). Remnants of the lunar deity may exist in Latvian moon god Mēness, Anatolian (Phrygian) deity Men; Mene, another name for Selene, and in Zoroastrian lunar deity Mah (Måŋha). According to the Encyclopedia of Indo-European Culture (EIEC), the moon in Indo-European cosmogony was likely associated with the mind. However, the EIEC also suggests that such a relationship may have emerged secondarily as a consequence of the phonological similarity between the Proto-Indo-European word for "Moon" and the root *men- ("to think").

== See also ==
- Eye of Ra

== Sources ==
- Agostini, Domenico; Thrope, Samuel (2020). The bundahišn: The Zoroastrian Book of Creation. New York: Oxford University Press. ISBN 9780190879044.
- Beekes, Robert (1982). "Gav. må, the Pie word for 'moon, month', and the perfect participle" (PDF). Journal of Indo-European Studies. 10: 53–64. Archived (PDF) from the original on December 12, 2024.
- Beekes, Robert (2010). Lubotsky, Alexander (ed.). Etymological Dictionary of Greek. Leiden Indo-European Etymological Dictionary Series. with the assistance of Lucien van Beek. Brill. ISBN 978-90-04-17418-4.
- Bortolani, Ljuba Merlina (2016). Magical Hymns from Roman Egypt: A Study of Greek and Egyptian Traditions of Divinity. Cambridge University Press. ISBN 9781316673270.
- Bray, David (1999). "Sacral Elements of Irish Kingship". In Cusack, Carole M.; Oldmeadow, Peter (eds.). This Immense Panorama: Studies in Honour of Eric J. Sharpe. Sydney Studies in Religion. Vol. 2. Australia: School of Studies in Religion, University of Sydney. ISBN 1-86487-061-3.
- Broz, Vlatko (2011). "Kennings as blends and prisms". Jezikoslovlje. XII (2): 165–186.
- Burrow, T. (1973) [1955]. The Sanskrit Language (New and revised ed.). London: Faber and Faber.
- Carmichael, Alexander (1940). Watson, James Carmichael (ed.). Carmina Gadelica. Vol. III. Edinburgh: Oliver and Boyd.
- Cook, Arthur Bernard (1964) [1914]. Zeus: Zeus, god of the bright sky. Zeus: A Study in Ancient Religion. Vol. 1. Biblo and Tannen.
- Demiraj, Bardhyl; Neri, Sergio (2020). "díell -i". Wörterbuch – DPEWA. DPEWA - Digitales Philologisch-Etymologisches Wörterbuch des Altalbanischen.
- Derksen, Rick (2008). Lubotsky, Alexander (ed.). Etymological Dictionary of the Slavic Inherited Lexicon. Leiden Indo-European Etymological Dictionary Series. Vol. IV. Brill. ISBN 978-90-04-15504-6.
- Dexter, Miriam Robbins (2006). "The Roots of Indo-European Patriarchy: Indo-European Female Figures and the Principles of Energy". In Biaggi, Cristina (ed.). The Rule of Mars: Readings on the Origins, History and Impact of Patriarchy. Manchester: Knowledge, Ideas & Trends. ISBN 9781879198319. OCLC 71227939.
- Dixon-Kennedy, Mike (1998). Encyclopedia of Russian and Slavic myth and legend. Santa Barbara, California: ABC-CLIO. ISBN 978-1-57607-130-4.
- Dushi, Arbnora (2020). "The Sister-Brother Recognition Motif in the Albanian Folk Ballad: Meaning and Contexts within the National Culture". Tautosakos Darbai. 59: 17–29. doi:10.51554/TD.2020.28363. S2CID 253540847.
- Dynda, Jiří (2014-10-13). "The Three-Headed One at the Crossroad. A Comparative Study of the Slavic God Triglav". Studia mythologica Slavica. 17. doi:10.3986/sms.v17i0.1495.
- Ferdowsi (1967) [c. 977 and 1010 CE]. Yar-Shater, Eshan (ed.). Shahnameh [The Epic of the Kings]. Persian Heritage Series. Translated by Levy, Reuben; Banani, Amin. Routledge & Kegan Paul Ltd. ISBN 0-7100-1367-1.
- Fortson, Benjamin W. (2004). Indo-European Language and Culture. Blackwell Publishing. ISBN 1-4051-0316-7.
- Gamkrelidze, Thomas V.; Ivanov, Vjaceslav V. (1995). Winter, Werner (ed.). Indo-European and the Indo-Europeans: A Reconstruction and Historical Analysis of a Proto-Language and a Proto-Culture. Trends in Linguistics: Studies and Monographs 80. Berlin: M. De Gruyter.
- Gjoni, Irena (2012). Marrëdhënie të miteve dhe kulteve të bregdetit të Jonit me areale të tjera mitike (PhD) (in Albanian). Tirana: University of Tirana, Faculty of History and Philology.
- Hammond, N.G.L.; Scullard, Howard Hayes, eds. (1992). The Oxford Classical Dictionary (2nd ed.). Oxford University Press. ISBN 0-19-869117-3.
- Hysi, Shyqyri (2006). "Kulte tradicionale shqiptare" [Albanian Traditional Cults]. Gjurmime Albanologjike - Folklor Dhe Etnologji (in Albanian) (36). Instituti Albanologjik i Prishtinës: 349–361.
- Ivanov, Vyacheslav (2011). "A Probable Structure of a Protoform of the Ancient Armenian Song of Vahagn" (PDF). Armenian Journal of Near Eastern Studies. VI (1). Yerevan. Archived from the original (PDF) on October 13, 2022.
- Jackson, Peter (2002). "Light from Distant Asterisks. Towards a Description of the Indo-European Religious Heritage". Numen. 49 (1): 61–102. doi:10.1163/15685270252772777. JSTOR 3270472.
- Jones, Prudence; Pennick, Nigel (1995). A History of Pagan Europe. Routledge. ISBN 978-1-136-14172-0.
- Kazanas, N.D. (2001). "Indo-European Deities and the Rigveda" (PDF). Journal of Indo-European Studies. 29. Archived (PDF) from the original on February 6, 2025.
- Keneryi, Karl (1951). The Gods of the Greeks. Thames & Hudson.
- Laurinkienė, Nijolė (2021). "Образ "повозки / колесницы Солнца" в балтийской мифологии как отголосок индоевропейской духовной культуры" [Image of "Sun carriage / chariot" in Baltic mythology as an ersound of Indo-European spiritual culture]. Балто-славянские Исследования (in Russian). 21. doi:10.31168/2658-5766.2021.21.15.
- Leeming, David Adams (July 17, 2003). From Olympus to Camelot: The World of European Mythology (1st ed.). New York: Oxford University Press. ISBN 978-0195143614.
- Lincoln, Bruce (1976). "The Indo-European Cattle-Raiding Myth" (PDF). History of Religions. 16 (1): 42–65. doi:10.1086/462755. JSTOR 1062296.
- Lincoln, Bruce (1999). Theorizing Myth: Narrative, Ideology, and Scholarship. Chicago: University of Chicago Press. ISBN 978-0-226-48201-9.
- Lurker, Manfred (2004). The Routledge Dictionary of Gods Goddesses Devils and Demons. Routledge. ISBN 978-04-15340-18-2.
- MacKillop, James (2004). "eye". A Dictionary of Celtic Mythology. Oxford University Press. doi:10.1093/acref/9780198609674.001.0001. ISBN 9780198609674.
- Mallory, James P.; Adams, Douglas Q. (1997). Encyclopedia of Indo-European Culture. London: Routledge. ISBN 978-1-884964-98-5.
- Mallory, James P.; Adams, Douglas Q. (2006). The Oxford Introduction to Proto-Indo-European and the Proto-Indo-European World. Oxford, England: Oxford University Press. ISBN 978-0-19-929668-2.
- Martirosyan, Hrach (November 23, 2009). Etymological Dictionary of the Armenian Inherited Lexicon. Leiden Indo-European Etymological Dictionary Series. Vol. 8. Leiden and Boston: Brill. ISBN 978-90-04-17337-8.
- Matasović, Ranko (2009). ""Sun" and "Moon" in Celtic and Indo-European" (PDF). Studia Celto-Slavica. 2 (1): 154–162. doi:10.54586/jxqd2619. Archived from the original (PDF) on October 1, 2025.
- Matasović, Ranko (2018). A Reader in Comparative Indo-European Religion (PDF). Zagreb: University of Zagreb. Archived (PDF) from the original on September 4, 2025.
- Meagher, Robert E. (2002). The Meaning of Helen: In Search of an Ancient Icon. Bolchazy-Carducci Publishers. pp. 46ff. ISBN 978-0-86516-510-6.
- Melchert, Craig (2019). "Solar and Sky Deities in Anatolian" (PDF). In Catt, Adam Alvah; Kim, Ronald I.; Vine, Brent (eds.). QAZZU Warrai: Anatolian and Indo-European Studies in Honor of Kazuhiko Yoshida. United States of America: Beech Stave Press. ISBN 978-0-9895142-6-2. Archived (PDF) from the original on December 23, 2023.
- Mouton, Alice (2023). "Solar Deities in the Kuwattalla Ritual Tradition: Epithets and Functions". In Warbinek, Livio; Giusfredi, Federico (eds.). Theonyms, Panthea and Syncretisms in Hittite Anatolia and Northern Syria. Studia Asiana. Vol. 14. Firenze University Press. pp. 127–140. doi:10.36253/979-12-215-0109-4.13. ISBN 979-12-215-0109-4.
- Pettit, Edward, ed. (2023). The Poetic Edda: A Dual Language Edition. OpenBook Publishers. doi:10.11647/OBP.0308. ISBN 978-1-80064-775-6.
- Shuteriqi, Dhimitër S. (1959). Historia e letërsisë shqipe. Vol. 1. Universiteti Shtetëror i Tiranës, Instituti i Historisë dhe Gjuhësisë.
- Sick, David (2004). "Mit(h)ra(s) and the Myths of the Sun". Numen. 51 (4): 432–467. doi:10.1163/1568527042500140.
- Sokoli, Ramadan (2013) [1999]. "The Albanian World in the Folk Teller's Stories". In Margaret Read MacDonald (ed.). Traditional Storytelling Today: An International Sourcebook. Translated by Pranvera Xhelo. Routledge. ISBN 9781135917142.
- Steitler, Charles (2019). "Distinguishing the Profiles and Original Milieus of the Solar Deities in Old Hittite Texts". In Süel, A. (ed.). Acts of the IXth International Congress of Hittitology. ISBN 978-975-17-4338-1.
- Straižys, Vytautas; Klimka, Libertas (1997-02-01). "The Cosmology of the Ancient Balts". Journal for the History of Astronomy. 28 (22): S57–S81. doi:10.1177/002182869702802207. Archived from the original on December 5, 2025.
- Tirta, Mark (2004). Petrit Bezhani (ed.). Mitologjia ndër shqiptarë (in Albanian). Tirana: Mësonjëtorja. ISBN 99927-938-9-9.
- West, Martin L. (2007). Indo-European Poetry and Myth (PDF). Oxford, England: Oxford University Press. ISBN 978-0-19-928075-9.
- Whitney, William Dwight (1885). The Roots, Verb-forms, and Primary Derivatives of the Sanskrit Language. Leipzig: Breitkopf and Härtel.
- Whitney, William Dwight (1905). Lanman, Charles Rockwell (ed.). Atharva-Veda Samhita. Harvard Oriental Series (1st ed.). Cambridge, Massachusetts: Harvard University.
- Wright, David P. (2007). "Anatolia: Hittites". In Johnston, Sarah Iles (ed.). Ancient Religions. Harvard University Press. pp. 189–196. doi:10.4159/9780674039186-020. ISBN 978-0-674-03918-6.
- York, Michael (August 1993). "Toward a Proto-Indo-European vocabulary of the sacred". WORD. 44 (2): 235–254. doi:10.1080/00437956.1993.11435902.
