= Stribog =

Slavic god

- Member of Vladimir's pantheon

Stribog (Note: Old East Slavic: Стрибо́гъ, Stribogǔ Belarusian: Стрыбог, Stryboh [strɨˈbɔx]; Russian: Стрибог, Stribog [strʲɪˈbok]; Ukrainian: Стрибог, Stryboh [strɪˈbɔɦ])) is a god in Slavic mythology found in three East Slavic sources, whose cult may also have existed in Poland. The sources do not inform about the functions of the god, but nowadays he is most often interpreted as a wind deity who distributes wealth.

== History ==
Stribog appears for the first time in the 12th-century Primary Chronicle together with other gods for whom Vladimir the Great erected statues:

And Vladimir began to reign alone in Kiev, and he set up idols on the hill outside the castle: one of Perun, made of wood with a head of silver and a moustache of gold, and others of Khors, Dazhbog, Stribog, Simargl, Mokosh. The people sacrificed to them, calling them gods. They brought their sons and daughters and sacrificed [them] to demons. They desecrated the earth with their offerings. And the land of Rus and the hill were defiled with blood. But the gracious God desires not the death of sinners. Upon that hill now stands the church of Saint Basil, as we shall later narrate.

Old East Slavic text

И нача княжити Володимеръ въ Киевѣ единъ, и постави кумиры на холму внѣ двора теремнаго: Перуна дрезяна, а главу его сребрену, а усъ златъ, и Хърса, Дажьбога, и Стрибога и Симарьгла, и Мокошь. И жряху имъ, наричюще я богы, и привожаху сыны своя и дъщери, и жряху бѣсомъ, и оскверняху землю требами своими. И осквернися кровьми земля Руска и холмо-тъ. Ио преблагий богъ не хотя смерти грѣшникомъ, на томъ холмѣ нынѣ церкви стоить, святаго Василья есть, якоже послѣди скажемъ.

— Primary Chronicle

In The Tale of Igor's Campaign, the winds are called Stribog's grandsons:

Now the winds, sons of Stribog, blow from the sea like arrows on the valiant campaign of Igor.

Old East Slavic text

Се вѣтри, Стрибожи ⟨/Стьри-?⟩ вънуци, вѣють съ моря стрѣлами на храбрыѣ ⟨хоробрыѣ⟩ пълкы Игоревы.

— The Tale of Igor's Campaign

The word of John Chrysostom also mentions Stribog:

Oh, perfidious devil’s deceit, not even pagans would do it! And others believe in Stribog, Dazhbog and Pereplut, for whom they drink from horns while cavorting, having forgotten God who created heaven and earth, the seas and rivers. And this way they rejoice in their idols.

== Legacy ==
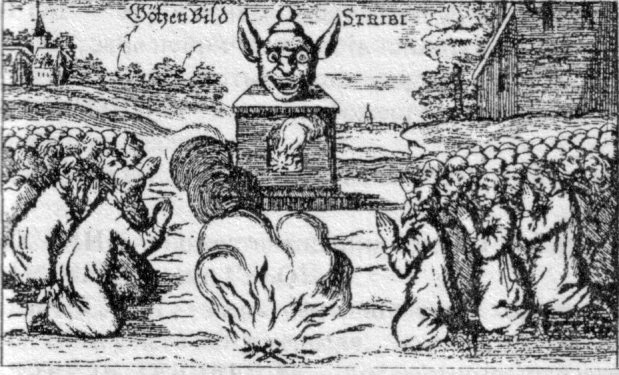
Christian propaganda performance of Stribog, Georg A. Schleusing, La religion ancienne et moderne des Moscovites, 1698.

After Christianization, the name was preserved in toponymy: Стрибожь, Stribozh' in Novgorod Governorate, Стрибоже, Strybozhe leak, Стрибожская, Strybozhskaya river in Kiev Voivodeship, Стрибож, Strybozh village in Zhytomyr Oblast, in Poland Strzyboga village and the Striboc (= Stribog) stream near Tczew, attested in the 1282, and possibly Latin name for river from modern-day Germany Striboz (1122).

== Etymologies and interpretations ==
=== Modern etymologies ===
==== Wind interpretation ====
According to Roman Jakobson, Stribog contains the stem stri-, derived from the Proto-Slavic verb *sterti "to extend, spread, widen, scatter" attested only with suffixes, e.g. Polish rozpostrzeć, Russian простереть, prosteret', or Old Czech (nepokoj) strieti. The verb comes from the Proto-Indo-European root *ster-, which in Latin occurs in the verb sterno and in the Greek verb στόρνυμι, stórnymi "to spread". The theonym would thus consist of the stem stri- and the word bog "god". On this basis, he considers Stribog to be "disperser, apportioner of riches", a complementary god to Dazhbog, "giver of riches". Proof of Stribog's association with wind is to be found in his Hindu counterpart, the wind god Vayu, who says in the Avesta "I am called he who spreads". He links the pair of Dazhbog and Stribog with the Vedic pair of Bhaga and Amsha, or the Greek pair of Aisa and Poros. This etymology is one of the most popular.

According to Michał Łuczyński, Jakobson's etymology is linguistically correct, however, according to him, the division of the theonym into stri- and -bog is unlikely, since hydronyms and personal names indicate that the consonant ⟨b⟩ belonged to the root, not the suffix, e.g., the Ukrainian hydronym Стриб, Stryb, or Polish names beginning with Strzyb-: *Strzybala, Strzybalska, Strzybna, Strzybny.

Stanisław Urbańczyk, following Lubor Niederle and Alexander Afanasyev, linked the theonym with the Czech dialectal (Moravian) stři "strong wind, air", and explained the theonym as "god of creaking, swishing".

Jakobson's etymology was supported by Aleksander Gieysztor. In his search for manifestations of the cult of wind in the Slavs, he pointed to the Bulgarian wind тъмичарин, tŭmicharin, which brings darkness and blinds, and in Serbia the southern wind is called "one-eyed" (чоравац, čoravac), which may be an echo of some ancient mythological motif, to which perhaps is related the one-eyed Odin, who, like Stribog, is placed in the first group of Dumézil's tripartite, and who is sometimes interpreted as the god of wind, breath.

==== Water interpretation ====
Omelyan Ohonóvsʹkyy and Aleksander Brückner rejected the wind etymology as unwarranted. Instead, they related the theonym to the Ukrainian verb стриба́ти, strybaty "to jump" and explained it as "god-jumper, god who jumps". Brückner divided the word in terms of its structure into the segment strib-, and the suffix -og, in the likeness of Svarog (svar- + -og). He pointed to a whole family of words with the strib- segment connected with jumping: стриб, stryb "jump", стриба́ти, strybaty "to jump", стрибо́к, strybok "jump", стрибну́ти, strybnuty "to jump", etc. He further indicated that he could not say anything more about the theonym.

Michał Łuczyński returns to such an etymology. He points out that the Ukrainian word about such a meaning is also found in some south-western dialects of Russian. In addition, he points out that while researching the etymology of this theonym, certain words were overlooked: Russian стрыбый, strybyy "rapid, swift ("fast-dripping")", Russian dial. стрива́ть, stribat' "to flash (of lightning)", and Ukrainian стрибати, strybaty in the meaning "to escape, fly", "to jump high and far". He reconstructs the Proto-Slavic form of these words as *strybati from the Proto-Slavic stem *strū-. According to him, "to jump", "to leap" as the meaning of this word family in Ukrainian and some Russian dialects developed late, and the original meaning of these words would be "to move at high speed", and "to flow". He points to the Baltic equivalent of the meaning of Russian strybyy "rapid, swift", Lithuanian sraujùs "rapid", Latvian stràujš "fast, quick, rapid", which may indicate the probable existence of Russian stryb- "current (water)", cf. Lithuanian sraujà, Latvian strauja "current (water)". Additionally, Russian dial. stribat' "to flash (of lightning)" bears a close semantic resemblance to Serbo-Croatian strujiti "to flow (of electricity)", and quotes other linguists, according to whom Serbo-Croatian strujiti can refer to water as well as air, and figuratively also to electricity.

He reconstructs the Proto-Slavic form of the theonym as *Strybogъ, which would consist of the segment *strybъ (a verb noun from *strybati "to move quickly" from "to flow, run"), and the suffix -ogъ, which had no function. The segment itself would continue the Proto-Slavic stem *stry- "to flow, run", from the Proto-Balto-Slavic *srū-, from the Proto-Indo-European *srew- "to flow". This etymology is supported by the fact that after Christianization this theonym was preserved mainly in hydronyms, which proves that the meaning of the theonym was known to the Slavs.

The Old East Slavic notation of the theonym (Стрибогъ, Stribogǔ) with the vowel ⟨i⟩ instead of the expected ⟨y⟩ is explained as a mixing of these vowels, which is attested in the texts of southern East Slavic since the end of the 11th century, which is connected with the influence of the grammar of the Old Church Slavonic/Bulgarian language on the Old East Slavic language. The mixing of these vowels also occurs in hydronyms (*Stir-/*Styr) and in Ukrainian, cf. Стрый/Стрий, Stryj/Strij, Стрына/Стрина, Stryna/Strina.

=== Dated and other etymologies ===
According to Mark Vey, Stribog could in fact be originally an epithet meaning literally "father god", which was used in the religions of Indo-Europeans to describe the god of the bright sky. The reconstructed Proto-Indo-European term for "god father" is *Dyḗus ph₂tḗr (cp. Roman Jupiter (Iūpiter, Diespiter), Greek Zeus (Zeus Pater) and Vedic Dyaus (Dyáuṣ-pitṛ́); sometimes in reverse order) and its local variety *ph₂tḗr bhagos. After the so-called Iranian inversion, Slavic peoples abandoned the word *dyḗus and replaced it with the word bog, which is borrowed from Iranian languages (from the PIE. *bhagos) and which appears as a second part of the name. Proto-Indo-European *ph₂tḗr ("father") is generally also considered to be absent in the Slavic languages (replaced by the synonym *átta → otec) or even in the Balto-Slavic languages, (Note: According to some linguists, Baltic words for "father" (Lithuanian: tėvas, Latvian: tēvs, Prussian: tāws) may come from *ph₂tḗr by moving into *te.) but according to Vey, *ph₂tḗr turned into the Slavic word *stryjь, which now means "uncle, father's brother" as follows: *ph₂tḗr → *ptri- → stri- and is the first part of the name. Stribog could therefore be the Slavic god of sky. This etymology has been advocated by a number of scholars, including Vyacheslav Ivanov and Vladimir Toporov who placed Stribog in the first group of the so-called the trifunctional hypothesis of Dumézil, which groups the main deities who look after the community and watch over the distribution of goods.

Such etymology is criticized by most linguists. The word *stryjь is derived from PIE *stru-io- and is cognate to Lithuanian strùjus "uncle, old man", Old Irish sruith "old, venerable" and Old Welsh strutiu "old man", and the process described by Vey did not occur in Slavic language. Brückner in his Dictionary noted that the word stryj was sometimes referred to as "good wind" and connected it to the core stru- "to flow" (cf. Stryj in Ukraine, Struma in Bulgaria).

There are also other interpretations of the name: Zelenin connected the stri- root with the word стрити, stryty (Proto-Slavic *sъtьri) "to annihilate, destroy," and considered Stribog to be "annihilating, destroying god," the god of war. This view was supported by Orlov and Borovsky, this may also be indicated by the fact that Vayu is also worshipped as the god of war, of the dead, of the harvest, but also of the good and bad fate, as he connects sky and earth. The name was also associated with the nickname of Ahura Mazda Śribaya/Stribaya ("god of beauty", "god worthy of honor", cf. Sanskrit श्री, śri "beauty"), which is supposed to be an Iranian influence and ultimately come from *ph₂tḗr bhagos, but this etymology is problematic. Pisani reconstructed the name as *strigo-bogъ, in which *strigo- would correspond to the Latin frigus ("frost, cold") and in that case Stribog would be the god of cold.

== Cultural depictions ==
In the 12th century poem The Tale of Igor's Campaign the winds are called "Stribogs grandsons"

Stribog is a mentioned in Mercedes Lackey World Divided Book 2 (2012) of the Secret World Chronicles where slavic folklore entities are reimagined as meta humans.

Strzybog, depicted as a deity of wind, appears as a supporting character in Devil's Deal (2024) by Layla Fae.

The Wind Child (2002) by Gabriela Houston features as a protagonist a granddaughter of the deity Stribog.

Jake's Magical Market: A Trek Through Time (2023) by J.R. Matthews features as a minor character Stribog, God of Wind and Storm.

== Influences ==
- HD 75898 − star named after Stribog
- Stribog Mountains on the Brabant Island, Antarctica
- Ivana Brlić-Mažuranić: Šuma Striborova ("Stribor's forest") – a tale, part of her collection of tales titled Croatian Tales of Long Ago.
- Grand Power Stribog − firearm by the Slovak firm Grand Power s.r.o named for the deity Stribog
- Striborg - Australian black metal musician named after the deity.

== Bibliography ==
- Vey, Mark (1958). "К этимологии древнерусского Стрибогъ". Voprosy Jazykoznanija (PDF) (in Russian). Moscow: Nauka.
- "Стрибог". Энциклопедия "Слова о полку Игореве" (in Russian). Vol. 5. Слово Даниила Заточника — Я. Дополнения. Карты. Указатели. Petersburg: Дмитрий Буланин. 1995. pp. 68–70. ISBN 5-86007-030-6.
- Gippert, Jost (2002). "Neues zu „slavisch st aus älterem pt"?". Namen, Sprachen und Kulturen. Festschrift für Heinz Dieter Pohl zum 60. Geburtstag (in German). Vienna: Praesens. pp. 239–256. ISBN 3706901641.
- Gieysztor, Aleksander (2006). Mitologia Słowian. Warsaw: Wydawnictwa Uniwersytetu Warszawskiego. ISBN 978-83-235-0234-0.
- Jakobson, Roman (1985). Selected Writings. Vol. VII Contributions to comparative mythology. Studies in linguistics and philology, 1972–1982. Stephen Rudy (red.) (2 ed.). Mouton. ISBN 9780899250519.
- Mallory, James P.; Adams, Douglas Q. (2006). The Oxford Introduction to Proto-Indo-European and the Proto-Indo-European World. Oxford, UK: Oxford University Press. ISBN 978-0-19-929668-2.
- Derksen, Rick (2008). Etymological Dictionary of the Slavic Inherited Lexicon. Brill. ISBN 9789004155046.
- Brückner, Aleksander (1927). Słownik etymologiczny languagea polskiego. Krakowska Spółka Wydawnicza.
- Szyjewski, Andrzej (2003). Religia Słowian. Kraków: Wydawnictwo WAM. ISBN 83-7318-205-5.
- de Vries, Jan (1970). Altgermanische Religionsgeschichte. Grundriss der germanischen Philologie (in German). Vol. 2. Berlin: De Gruyter.
- Łuczyński, Michał (2020). Bogowie dawnych Słowian. Studium onomastyczne. Kielce: Kieleckie Towarzystwo Naukowe. ISBN 978-83-60777-83-1.
- Brückner, Aleksander (1985). Mitologia słowiańska. Warszawa: Państwowe Wydawnictwo Naukowe. ISBN 8301062452.
- Váňa, Zdeněk (1990). Svět slovanských bohů a démonů. Prague: Panorama. ISBN 80-7038-187-6.
- Ivanov, Vyacheslav; Toporov, Vladimir (1988). Tokarev, Sergei (ed.). Мифы народов мира. Vol. 2. К—Я. Moscow: Больша́я росси́йская энциклопе́дия.
- Ohonóvsʹkyy, Omelyán (1876). Слово о полку Игореве. Lviv.
- Trubachyov, Oleg (2003). Этногенез и культура древнейших славян: Лингвистические исследования. Moscow: Nauka. ISBN 5-02-032661-5.
- Anatoliy, Abrashkin (2016). Русские боги (in Russian). Aegitas. ISBN 9781773131597.
- Alvarez-Pedroza, Juan Antonio (2021). Sources of Slavic Pre-Christian Religion. Leiden: Koninklijke Brill. ISBN 978-90-04-44138-5.
