= Slavic creation myths =

Cosmogonic myth in Slavic mythology

The Slavic creation myths are myths in Slavic paganism that explain how the world was created. These myths, in their Christianized form, survived until the nineteenth and twentieth century in various parts of the Slavdom in chronicles or folklore. In the Slavic mythology several creation myths are recorded: the first version is the so-called earth-diver myth, which intertwines two main motifs: the dualistic motif – the cooperation of God and the Devil (that is, the "good god" and the "bad god") is required to create the world, and the oceanic motif – the pre-existence water, where the seed of the Earth comes from; the second version speaks about the origin of the universe and the world from the Cosmic Egg and the World Tree; the third one about creation from a dismemberment of a primordial being.

== Creation by diving ==
The myth that has been preserved from Poland comes from the Sieradz Land and was written down in 1898:

In the beginning, there was nothing but the sky, the sea, the God who sailed by boat and the devil emerging from the sea foam, who sat down to God. The idea of creating the Earth was suggested to God by the devil, who could not do it by himself alone. The devil immersed himself and brought out a handful of sand from the bottom. God threw it on the water and created the beginning of the Earth so thin that they both barely fit on it. God and the devil inhabited the Earth, the devil thought to push the sleeping God into the water, but he contributed to the expansion of the land from the side of God, from the east and from his own side, from the west. Both creators started a dispute that ended up with God going to heaven and knocking down the devil, who also went there, by lightning into the abyss.

In the Russian and Ukrainian variants, the devil retains some of the sand created under the tongue, and when the Earth begins to grow, the sand bursts out his mouth. This myth was written by the Russian slavist Alexander Afanasyev, who was one of the first researchers to study Russian folklore in 1859:

At the beginning of the world, God favored to expand the earth. They called the Devil, told him to dive into the abyss of water to get a handful of earth from there and bring it to him. – Fine, Devil thinks, I will make the same land myself! He dived, took out a handful of earth and stuffed his mouth with it. He brought it to God and gives it to him, but he himself does not say a word... The Lord throws the earth, wherever he throws it, it is suddenly so flat that even when you stand at one end – you can see everything that is happening at the other... Devil looks... wanted to say something and choked. God asked him: what does he want? The devil coughed up and ran away in fear. Then the thunder and lightning struck the running Devil, and where he will lie down – there will be hills and slides, where he will cough – there will grow a mountain, where he will jump – there will stick out the celestial mountain. And so, running all over the earth, he dug it up: he made hills, slides, mountains and high mountains.

— Alexander Afanasyev, Traditional Russian Legends,

The dualistic creation myth by "evil god" diving has 24 credentials in Balto-Slavic areas and 12 credentials in Finno-Ugric areas. The Bulgarian myth does not mention the Devil's catastrophe, but it develops the theme of creation by the formula "by God's and my power", and the Devil, who twice reversed the order of the formula, could not reach the bottom until the third time he pronounced the formula correctly, reaching the bottom.

The Moldavian variant also ends with the expansion of the Earth and the Transylvanian Romani extended the dualistic motif by punishing the devil by the bull and the Tree of Life, from which the people were formed. Only in a myth from Slovenia God goes to the bottom of the waters on His own. In another version of the myth, the Devil tries to push God into the sea to become the only creator – first he pushes him east, then west, south and north, but the land always expands. Annoyed by this fact, the Devil awakens God and tells him that it is time to bless the Earth, since it has grown so big. God suits him: "Once you carried me four ways to the water to throw me into it, you drew a cross with me, and this is how I blessed the earth myself." Then God goes to the Heavens and Devil, who attacked him, was thrown down into the abyss by lightning.

Seemingly, the consecration of the earth seems to be a Christian motif, but this motif is used in myths to set directions and exists in other mythologies: according to the Maidu, the Earth Maker descended into the cosmic center of the world and there he met a Coyote (a trickster figure), who after the creation of the world went to sleep. The Earth Maker stretched the Earth from the south, through the west, to the north, and when the Coyote woke up, he stretched the Earth to the east. When the Earth Maker was left alone, he went around the Earth, staggering a full circle, fixing (in one version of the myth) the Earth to cardinal directions with stone hooks. For some Indian tribes, therefore, determining the directions of the world is a religious activity and for this reason, the Mexican Huicholas interpret Christian sign of the cross as an imitation of the Indian myth. For the Slavs, therefore, "consecration to the Earth" is the structuring of the universe and the designation of the directions of the Earth, and the extension of the point state "to infinity". Yet another myth says that the Earth grows all the time and God, who is left alone, does not know how to stop it. So God sends a bee to overhear the Devil. The Devil, laughing at God, says to himself: a stupid God does not know that you have to take some stick, draw the sign of the cross and say "Enough of this Earth!" When the Devil saw a bee running away on his shoulder, he tried to catch it, but it ran away from him, so he cursed her master: "May he who sent you here eat your dung," and God, who heard this, ordered the bee to produce honey from now on. A myth from Dobrzyń Land says that the Devil tells the duck to steal some earth from God, and when she was returning with the earth in her beak, she was captured by a hawk, who started choking her, and from the earth that fell out of her beak, mountains were created. For the creation of the world or of a being, the cooperation of God and the Devil is always required, who are endowed with equal power.

Researchers also identify Slavic gods who hide under the Christian terms God and Devil. The Slavic word for God Bog or Boh was used by Christian missionaries as an equivalent of the Latin Deus and the Greek Theos because it corresponded meaningfully to the notion of a supernatural being, but in the Slavic religion, Bog always appears in compound names, i.e. Daž-bog, Stri-bog, Cherno-bog, or in names i.e. Boži-dar, Bohu-mil, Bogu-slav, etc., so most probably God was not a proper name for the figure mentioned in the myths of creation. When interpreting the figure of God, the text of Procopius on the religion of the Slavs may be helpful:

For they believe that one god, the maker of lightning, is alone lord of all things, and they sacrifice to him cattle and all other victims; but as for fate, they neither know it nor do they in any wise admit that it has any power among men, but whenever death stands close before them, either stricken with sickness or beginning a war, they make a promise that, if they escape, they will straightway make a sacrifice to the god in return for their life; and if they escape, they sacrifice just what they have promised, and consider that their safety has been bought with this same sacrifice.

— Procopius, The Gothic War

Kazimierz Moszyński, analyzing the folk image of the Christian God, indicates that God sits in heaven, sends rains in anger, shoots lightning at evil spirits, rules predatory animals and fate. These features indicate a god-thunderer, and therefore most likely Perun was replaced by God. Perun is one of the oldest Indo-European gods and is descended from the Proto-Indo-European storm god *perkʷunos. His name probably means literally the "Striking One" (compare Proto-Slavic *pьrati - "to beat, to hit"). The core *perkʷ means oak (cf. Latin querqus - "oak") - a sacred tree dedicated to Perun. In Ruthenian chronicles, he is presented as gray-haired, which would distinguish him from the Celtic Taranis, Germanic Thor or Hindu Indra as war gods, and made him resemble Roman Jupiter and Greek Zeus as rulers. However, according to some researchers, such as Henryk Łowmiański, the description of God rather points to Svarog. The Devil is interpreted as Veles, the god of the underworld. In Primary Chronicle, the Ruthenians, when making an alliance with the Greeks, swear on Perun and Veles, which may suggest that Veles' power was comparable to that of Perun. In Polish (and in some other Slavic languages too), just as Perun (Piorun) was devalued to the piorun "lightning", so Veles was devalued to the veles "devil, demon" in Czech. In South Slavic folklore, St. Elijah, the Christianized Perun, is often opposed to St. Nicholas, the Christianized Veles. The creation myth also fits Chernobog (lit. "Black God") and Belobog (lit. "White God"), who were to be worshiped by the Polabian Slavs:

The Slavs, too, have a strange conviction: At their feasts and carousals they pass about a libation bowl over which they utter words — I should not say of consecration but of execration — in the name of the gods. They believe that the good god directs the good fate, while the bad god directs the hostile one, which is why they call this evil god the Devil in their language, that is, Chernobog.

— Helmold, Chronica Slavorum

This myth may come from some ancient substrate, perhaps pre-European, assimilated by the Slavs and subjected to further transformations. This myth could also be perpetuated under the influence of the Persian antithetical couple Ahura Mazda and Ahriman, who left their mark in various syncretic religions. Bogomil's influence was also suggested: the followers of this religion claimed that the main drama of creation was the conflict between two brothers: the older Satanael (the suffix -el adds the divine element to Devil) and the younger Jesus (Savaof – the Word = Logos-Christ) – Satanael created the world and man, and God sent him the Word in the form of Jesus to save them. In the 16th century Legend of the Tiberian Sea, God, when he hovered over the water, saw Satanael as a water bird and ordered him to dive into the sea. According to the critics of this theory, it has serious shortcomings: the full text of this myth does not appear in any Bogomil texts, and this myth does not exist in areas dominated by Bogomilism, also in Western Europe, where the Cathars influenced the local folklore. This myth, however, existed in the territories of Poland, Ukraine and Belarus, where the Bogomil faith never reached.

== Creation from the Cosmic Egg ==
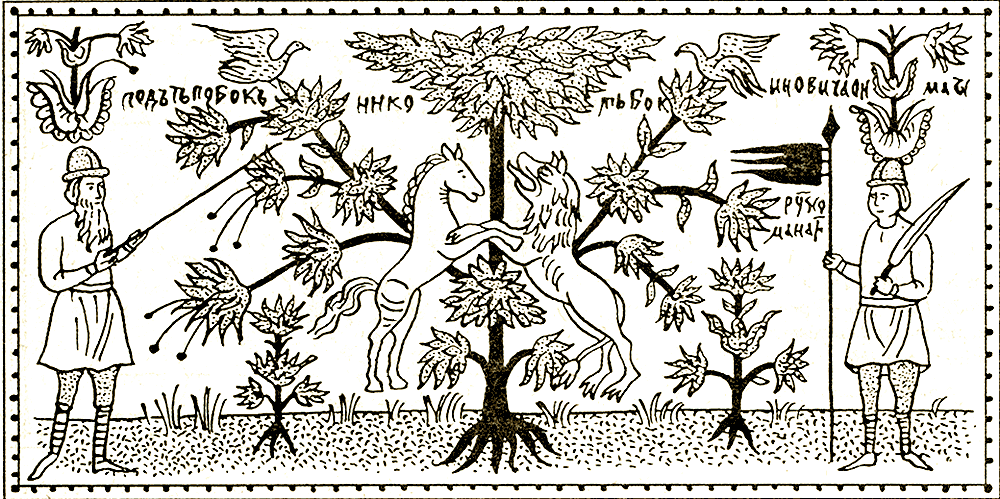
World Tree painted on the chest, Russia, late 17th century.

The myth in which the creation of the world from the Cosmic Egg or World Egg can be found in the Carpathian carol also written down by Afanasayev:

It used to be at the beginning of the world –
Then there was no sky or earth,
No sky nor earth but the blue sea,
And in the middle of the sea on oak
Two pigeons were sitting.
Two pigeons on an oak tree
They held such a council,
Happy debated and cooed:
How can we create the world?
We will fall to the bottom of the sea,
We'll bring out the fine sand
Fine sand, blue stone.
We will sow fine sand,
We will pick up the blue pebble.
From fine sand - black earth,
- icey water, green grass.
From the blue stone - the blue sky,
Blue sky, bright sun,
Bright sun, bright moon,
bright moon and all the stars

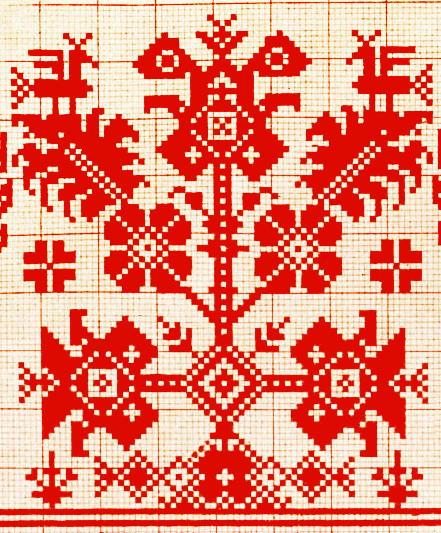
Russian ornament, 19th century.

This carol contains three elements: the first one is two pigeons sitting on an oak tree, the second one is the catching of sand and stones by birds, the third is the creation of the world. Two pigeons, birds, hens or bees sitting in the crown of the tree is a popular motif among the Slavs – it represents the World Tree. In folklore, the World Tree stands in the "navel of the world", it is supposed to be heavy, tall and with a wide leaf. In a similar preserved myth, God throws his staff into the water, which then changes into a tree. On its branch, God and the Devil sit down to take the world out of the water. The relationship of this prayer with the World Egg is indicated by the "fine sand" from which the "black earth" and the "blue stones" from which the heaven and the celestial objects are made. This corresponds to the widespread myths of the Cosmic Egg, which is broken down in the creative act, and from whose lower shell the Earth is formed, and from whose upper shell the Heavens are formed.

Vladimir Toporov also points to the existence of this myth in Russian fairy tales. In these fairy tales, the hero, looking for a princess, travels through three kingdoms, and after defeating three vipers, the kingdoms are reduced to three eggs.

As a result of the journey, the hero finds a big tree (usually an oak), saves the chicks sitting on tree branches, for which the mother of the chicks (usually an eagle) takes the hero from the underground kingdom to the ground. There, he throws each of the three eggs and these turn into three respective kingdoms

— Vladimir Toporov, Around the reconstruction of the myth of the cosmic egg (based on Russian fairy tales)

Fairy-tale eggs are generally submerged in water and their extraction and breaking up creates a "kingdom" – a world in fairy tongue. Also, the triple of egg-kingdoms is not accidental – it corresponds to the tripartite division of the world in Indo-European mythologies into Heaven (Vyraj), Earth and the Underworld (Nav). In Dobrzyń Land, it was directly believed that the world was created from an egg lying on a giant tree and the story of the princess from the egg, which the prince was to marry, was preserved: she was tricked by a witch into a duck that was killed, whose blood then grew into an apple tree. From Slovenia the myth has survived, where God sends a rooster to Earth, who lays an egg from which seven rivers are poured:

In the place where the earth was barren, there was nothing but bare stone. God regretted it and sent his rooster to earth to fertilize it and then raise the human race. The rooster goes down to the cliffs and lays an egg of miraculous power for a miraculous purpose. The egg hatches and seven rivers flow out of it a day. Rivers filled the landscape with water, and soon everything was green and the earth gave flowers and fruit.

There were also riddles in Poland that pointed to the egg: "There is a world. And in this world there is a yellow flower" or "There is a white world. And in this world a yellow flower".

== Creation from dismemberment ==
Another kind of creation myth has survived: the creation of the world from a dismembered first human or another being. Polish scholar Stanislaw Schayer recalled the text from the Dove Book, which was a collection of oral stories of the clergy, the following story: a great book fell from heaven, in which the history of being was written; kings ask tsar David to read it, but the book is too big, but David, inspired by the Holy Spirit, will answer three questions; the first one concerns the creation of the world:

Our white world has come from the Lord
The red sun from God's face
The young light of the moon from His chest
White auroras from God's eyes
The dense stars of His robes
Lush winds of the Holy Spirit
People of God from Adam
Clotted bones taken from stone
Our bodies from moist soil

In four variants, the last three lines replace the text:

Hence the tsars here on earth
From the holy head of Adam.
Hence the knyaz and boyars were born:
From the holy powers of Adam.
Hence the Orthodox peasants:
From the holy knee of Adam

This myth is most likely not a Christian influence, but Slavic phraseology has been Christianized, probably under the influence of the apocryphal Book of Enoch, in which the same was done with the Iranian myth, which in turn could have been the source of the Russian myth. A similar motif is present in other Indo-European myths: in Hindu mythology a society was formed from the body of Purusha – the first man: Brahmins from the mouth, warriors from the shoulders, peasants from the hips, shudras from the feet; in Scandinavia this being was Ymir and in Iran Gayōmart.

== Bibliography ==
- Afanasyev, Alexander (1914) [1859]. Shambinago, Sergei Konstantinovich (ed.). Traditional Russian Legends (in Russian). Moscow: Modern Problems.
- Gieysztor, Aleksander (2006). Mitologia Słowian (in Polish). Warsaw: Wydawnictwa Uniwersytetu Warszawskiego. ISBN 978-83-235-0234-0.
- Hernas, Czesław (1959). Literatura Ludowa (in Polish). Wroclaw: Polskie Towarzystwo Ludoznawcze. p. 38.
- Kelemina, Jakob (1930). Bajke in pripovedke slovenskega ljudstva (in Slovenian). Vol. 1. Družba sv. Mohorja. p. 282.
- Szyjewski, Andrzej (2003). Religia Słowian (in Polish). Krakow: Wydawnictwo WAM. ISBN 83-7318-205-5.
- Petrów, Aleksander (1878). Lud ziemi dobrzyńskiej, jego zwyczaje, mowa, obrzędy, pieśni, leki, zagadki, przysłowia itp (in Polish). Krakow: Uniwersytet Jagielloński.
