= Sol (Roman mythology) =

Roman god of the Sun

- God of the Sun
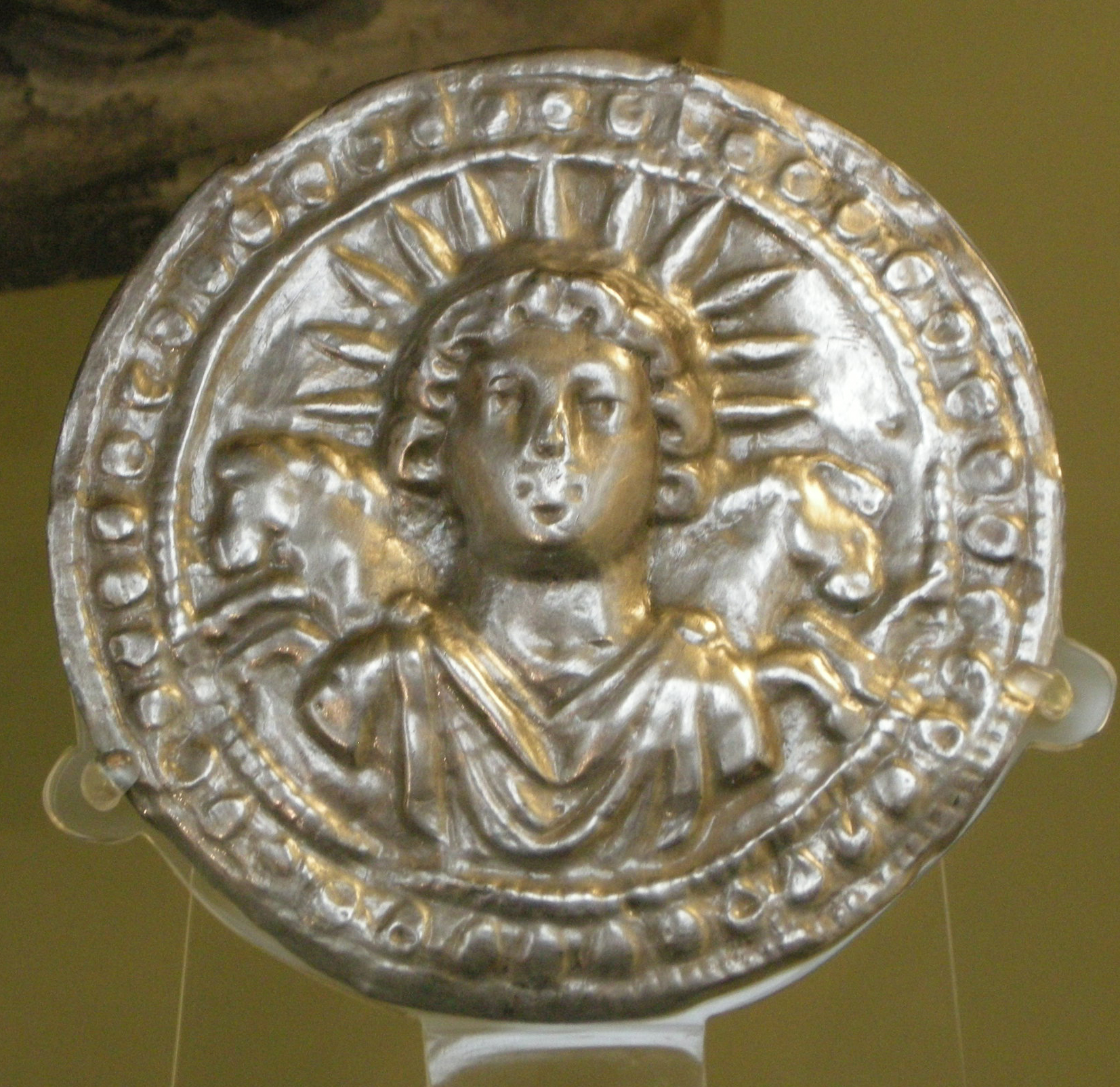
- Sol on a disk
- Abode: Sky
- Planet: Sun
- Symbol: Chariot, solar disk
- Day: Sunday (dies Solis)

Genealogy
- Siblings: Luna, Aurora

Equivalents
- Greek: Helios

Sol is the personification of the Sun and a god in ancient Roman religion. It was long thought that Rome actually had two different, consecutive sun gods: The first, Sol Indiges (Latin: the deified sun), was thought to have been unimportant, disappearing altogether at an early period. Only in the late Roman Empire, scholars argued, did the solar cult re-appear with the arrival in Rome of the Syrian Sol Invictus (Latin: the unconquered sun), perhaps under the influence of the Mithraic mysteries. Publications from the mid-1990s have challenged the notion of two different sun gods in Rome, pointing to the abundant evidence for the continuity of the cult of Sol, and the lack of any clear differentiation – either in name or depiction – between the "early" and "late" Roman sun god.

== Etymology ==
The Latin sol for "Sun" is believed to originate in the Proto-Indo-European language, as a continuation of the heteroclitic *Seh_{2}ul- / *Sh_{2}-en-, and thus cognate to other solar deities in other Indo-European languages: Germanic Sol, Sanskrit Surya, Avestan Hvare-khshaeta, Greek Helios, Lithuanian Saulė. Also compare Latin sol to Etruscan usil. Today, Romance languages still use reflexes of sol (e.g., Italian sole, Portuguese sol, Spanish sol, Romanian soare and French soleil) as the main word for "sun", as do all Scandinavian languages. (Note: Sol, borrowed from Latin, is used in contemporary English by astronomers and many science fiction authors as the proper name of the Sun to distinguish it from other stars which may be suns for their own planetary systems.)

== In the Roman Republic ==
According to Roman sources, the worship of Sol was introduced by Titus Tatius shortly after the foundation of Rome. In Virgil he is the grandfather of Latinus, the son of Sol's daughter Circe who lived not far from Rome at Monte Circeo. A shrine to Sol stood on the banks of the Numicius, near many important shrines of early Latin religion.

In Rome Sol had an "old" temple in the Circus Maximus according to Tacitus (56–117 CE), and this temple remained important in the first three centuries CE. There was also an old shrine for Sol on the Quirinal, where an annual sacrifice was offered to Sol Indiges on 9 August to commemorate Caesar's victory at Pharsala (48 BCE). (Note: "a.d. V Idus Augustas: Soli Indigeti in colle Quirinali Feriae quod eo die Gaius Caesar Gai filius Pharsali devicit" "August 9: Festival for Sol Indiges on the Quirinal Hill because on that day Gaius Caesar, son of Gaius, was victorious at Pharsala" – Quintilian. a.d. V Idus Augustas: Solis Indigetis in colle Quirinali Sacrificium Publicum) The Roman ritual calendars or fasti also mention a feast for Sol Indiges on 11 December, and a sacrifice for Sol and Luna on 28 August. Traditionally, scholars have considered Sol Indiges (Note: Sol Indiges is variously translated as "the native sun" or "the invoked sun" – the etymology and meaning of the word "indiges" is disputed.) to represent an earlier, more agrarian form in which the Roman god Sol was worshipped, and considered him to be very different from the late Roman Sol Invictus, who they believed was a predominantly Syrian deity. Neither the epithet "indiges" (which fell out of use sometime after Caesar) nor the epithet "invictus" are used with any consistency however, making it impossible to differentiate between the two.

== Sol Invictus ==
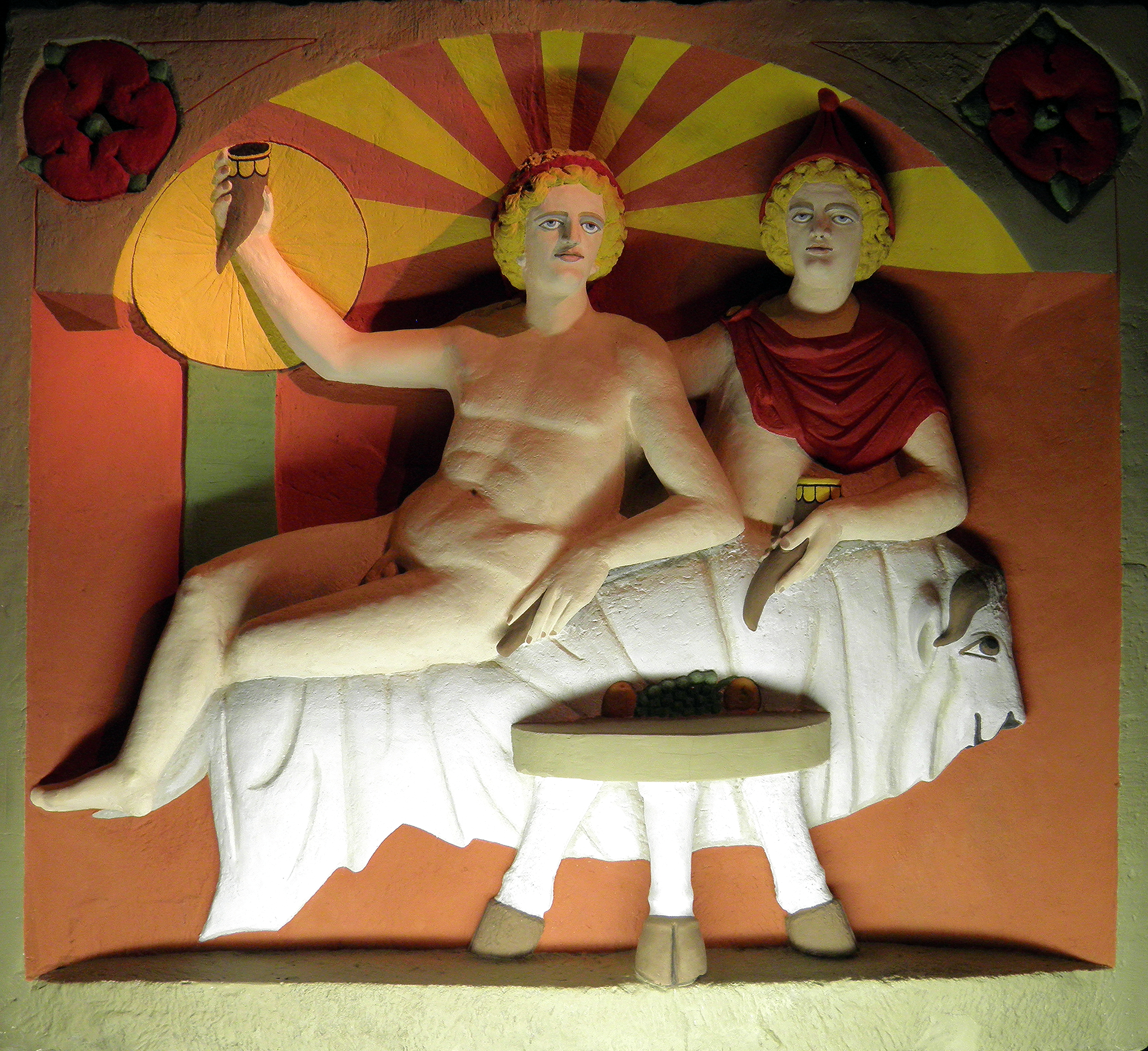
Polychrome reproduction of the Mithraic banquet scene featuring Mithras and the Sun god (Sol Invictus) banqueting on the hide of the slaughtered bull, dating to 130 CE, Lobdengau-Museum, Ladenburg, Germany

Sol Invictus (English translated as "Unconquered Sun") was long thought to have been a foreign state-supported sun god introduced from either Emesa or Palmyra in Syria by the emperor Aurelian in 274 and overshadowing other Eastern cults in importance, until the abolition of classical Roman religion under Theodosius I. However the evidence for this is meager at best, and the notion that Aurelian introduced a new cult of the sun ignores the abundant evidence on coins, in images, in inscriptions, and in other sources for a strong presence of the sun god in Rome throughout the imperial period. (Note: Gordon & Wallraff (2006) cite Hijmans (1996).) Tertullian (died 220 CE) writes that the Circus Maximus was dedicated primarily to Sol. During the reign of Aurelian, a new College of Pontiffs for Sol was established. There is some debate over the significance of the date 21 December for the cult of Sol. According to a single, late source, the Romans held a festival on 21 December of Dies Natalis Invicti, "the birthday of the unconquered one." Most scholars assume Sol Invictus was meant, although our source for this festival does not state so explicitly. (Note: The Natalis Invicti is mentioned only in the Calendar of Philocalus, which dates to 354 CE.)

25 December was commonly indicated as the date of the winter solstice, (Note: When Julius Caesar introduced the Julian calendar in 45 BCE, 25 December was approximately the date of the solstice. In modern times, the solstice falls on 21 or 22 December.) with the first detectable lengthening of daylight hours. The Philocalian calendar of AD 354, part VI, gives a festival of Natalis Invicti on 25 December. There is limited evidence that this festival was celebrated before the mid-4th century. (Note: "An inscription of unique interest from the reign of Licinius embodies the official prescription for the annual celebration by his army of a festival of Sol Invictus on December 19". The inscription actually prescribes an annual offering to Sol on 18 November (die XIV Kal(endis) Decemb(ribus), i.e., on the fourteenth day before the Kalends of December).) The same Philocalian calendar, part VIII, also mentions the birth of Jesus Christ, stating that the "Lord Jesus Christ was born eight days before the calends of January" (that is, on 25 December). Since the 12th century, there have been speculations that the near-solstice date of 25 December for Christmas was selected because it was the date of the festival of Dies Natalis Solis Invicti, but historians of late antiquity make no mention of this, and others speculate Aurelian chose 25 December to shadow early Christian celebrations already on the rise. When the festival on 25 December was instituted is not clear, which makes it hard to assess what impact (if any) it had on the establishment of Christmas.

There were also festivals on other days in December, including the 11th (mentioned above), as well as August. Gordon points out that none of these other festivals are linked to astronomical events.

Throughout the 4th century the cult of Sol continued to be maintained by high-ranking pontiffs, including the renowned Vettius Agorius Praetextatus.

== Connection to emperors ==
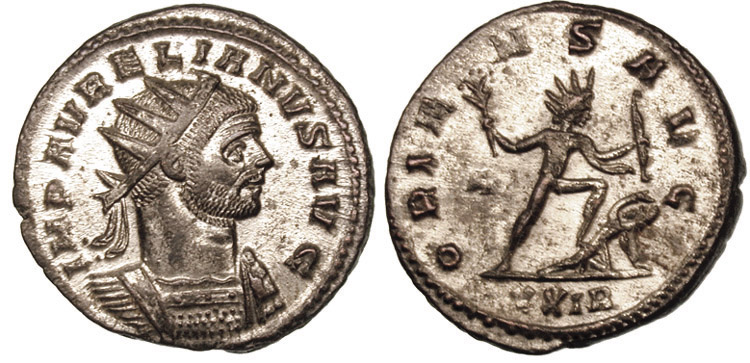
On the left, the Roman Emperor Aurelian with a radiate crown and on the right, a depiction of Sol

According to the Historia Augusta, Elagabalus, the teenaged Severan heir, adopted the name of his deity and brought his cult image from Emesa to Rome. Once installed as emperor, he neglected Rome's traditional State deities and promoted his own as Rome's most powerful deity. This ended with his murder in 222. The Historia Augusta equates the deity Elagabalus with Jupiter and Sol: fuit autem Heliogabali vel Iovis vel Solis sacerdos, "He was also a priest of Heliogabalus, or Jove, or Sol". While this has been seen as an attempt to import the Syrian sun god to Rome, the Roman cult of Sol had existed in Rome at least since the early Republic.

As the Cult of Sol grew and Sol took on attributes of other deities, Sol began to be used as a way to display imperial power. The radiate crown shown on some emperor's portraits on coins minted in the 3rd century was associated with Sol, and may have been influenced by earlier depictions of Alexander the Great. Some coins minted in the 4th century depict Sol on one side. Constantine I wore the "radiate crown" though some argue that it was intended to represent the "Holy Nails" and not Sol.

== Identification with other deities ==
Various Roman philosophers speculated on the nature of the sun, without arriving at any consensus. A typical example is Nigidius, a scholar of the 1st century BCE. His works have not survived, but writing five centuries later, Macrobius reports that Nigidius argued that Sol was to be identified with Janus and that he had a counterpart, Jana, who was Luna. As such, they were to be regarded as the highest of the gods, receiving their sacrifices before all the others. (Note: Macrobius, Saturnalia, i. 9.) Such speculations appear to have been restricted to an erudite elite and had no impact on the well-attested cult of Sol as independent deity: No ancient source aside from Macrobius mentions the equation of Sol with Janus.

== Connection to Mithras ==
Sol appears many times in depictions of Mithras, such as the Tauroctony of Mithras killing the bull, and looking at Sol over his shoulder. They appear in other scenes together from Mithras ascending behind Sol's chariot, shaking hands and some depictions of Sol kneeling to Mithras. Mithras was known as Sol Invictus even though Sol is a separate deity, a paradoxical relationship where they are each other but separate. They are separate deities but due to some similarities a connection between them can be created which can lead to one over taking the other.

== See also ==
- Amshuman
- Black Sun (alchemy)
- Guaraci
- List of solar deities
- Piltzintecuhtli
- Inti
