= Svarog =

Slavic blacksmith deity

Svarog (Note: Old East Slavic: Сваро́гъ Russian: Сварог [svɐˈrok])) is a Slavic god who may be associated with fire and blacksmithing and who was once interpreted as a sky god on the basis of an etymology rejected by modern scholarship. He is mentioned in only one source, the Primary Chronicle, which is problematic in interpretation. He is presented there as the Slavic equivalent of the Greek god Hephaestus. The meaning of his name is associated with fire. He is the father of Dazhbog and Svarozhits. Some scholars have suggested that Svarog was created from the figure of Svarozhits and never existed in the beliefs of the Slavs. After Christianization, his name was preserved in toponymy and vocabulary.

== Etymology ==
The theonym Svarog presents in several forms. The Primary Chronicle has Соварога (Sovaroga), Сварогъ (Svarogǔ), Сварогом (Svarogom), and Сварога (Svaroga). The Sofia Chronograph (Note: Later compilation.) has Сваро^{г} (Svaro^{g}) and Сваро^{ж} (Svaro^{ž}).

The fire etymology was one of the first to be proposed by the Slovene linguist Franc Miklošič (1875), who explained the theonym Svarog as consisting of the stem svar ('heat', 'light') and the suffix -og. The stem svar itself was derived from an earlier *sur "shining".

That etymology is also supported by contemporary linguists and etymologists, but the etymology of the stem svar can also be explained differently. The root svar derives from the Proto-Slavic *sъvarъ, which consists of the prefix *sъ- meaning "good, (ones') own" and the stem *varъ "fire, heat", which is continued, for example, by Old Church Slavonic варъ, varǔ ("heat"), or Old East Slavic варъ, varǔ "sunny heatwave, scorching heat, heat" (from Proto-Indo-European *wār- "warmth"). This root was then extended by the suffix *-ogъ, which has no specific function. The common noun *sъvarogъ "good, own fire, heat" was then transferred to the name of the god because of his function as a divine blacksmith, a god wielding fire, working with fire.

The *sъvarъ stem is also the origin of words related to blacksmithing. Some examples are Old East Slavic сварити, svariti "to forge something at high temperature", Old Polish zwarzyć "to weld, chain two pieces of iron", and modern Russian and Slovenian words (e.g. сварить, svarit', variti, "to melt", "to weld").

Some researchers, including Aleksander Brückner and Vatroslav Jagić, have suggested that the name stemmed from the word svar meaning "argument, disagreement", or the verb svariti "to quarrel". Brückner translated this theonym literally as "wrangler, brawler", which would also be associated with fire. However, this etymology has been criticized.

In earlier scholarship, the dominant view was that the root svar was borrowed from an Indo-Iranian language (e.g., from Sanskrit स्वर्, svar "radiance", "sky", "sun"), but this etymology is nowadays rejected due to phonetic difficulties.

== Legacy ==
After Christianization, Svarog was preserved in toponymy and vocabulary. In Bulgaria these are the towns of Сва́рог, Svarog, Сва́рошка бара, Svaroshka bara, in the Czech Republic it is the Svaroh mountain, and the Sorbian name Zwarogk. Brückner also added the Polish town of Swarożyn here, based on a notation in the German Latin Swarozino from 1205, but the original notation was Swarozina and is dated 1305, so it should be read as Swarocino, from the personal name Swarota, or, as other records indicate, the town was called Swaryszewo, from the personal name Swarysz. Modern notation Swarożyn should be regarded as false transcription.

In the Russian dialect (Novgorod) the obsolete word сва́рог, svarog meaning "fire" and "blacksmith", is preserved. The Romanian word sfarog, meaning "something burnt, charred, dried", was probably borrowed from an unspecified South Slavic language, probably Bulgarian, and the source word is reconstructed as *svarogъ.

== Svarog-Svarozhits ==
A god named Svarozhits appears in the sources as well. Some scholars have suggested that Svarozhits means 'young Svarog' or is a diminutive of Svarog. The argument for the existence of only one god is based on the fact that in Serbo-Croatian the suffix -ić means 'young' or 'small' (e.g., Djurdjić is not the 'son of Djurdjo', but 'little Djurdjo'). Brückner also believed that the Lithuanians called their gods fondly, e.g. Perkune dievaite meaning 'little god Perkun' and not 'god Perkun'. However, most scholars disagree with this interpretation. The suffix -its, -ich (from Proto-Slavic *-iťь) is most often a patronymic suffix (e.g. Polish pan 'master' → panicz 'son of a master'). The family relationship between Svarog and Svarozhits is also indicated by accounts of these gods.

== Sources ==
The only source that mentions Svarog is the Slavic translation of the Chronicle (Chronography) of John Malalas, which was placed in the Primary Chronicle under year 1114. In this translation, in glosses, the Greek god of fire and smithing Hephaestus is translated as Svarog, and his son, the sun god Helios, is translated as Dazhbog (glosses are in italics):

And after the flood and the division of the languages, the first to reign was Mestrom, of the line of Cam, after him Hermes, after him Hephaestus, whom the Egyptians call Svarog. During the reign of this Hephaestus in Egypt, at the time of his reign, tongs fell from the sky and he began to forge weapons, as before that they beat each other with sticks and stones. This Hephaestus established the law that women should marry a single man and behave in a chaste way, and he ordered that those who committed adultery should be punished. For this reason he was also called the god Svarog, as before this women fornicated with whomsoever they wished and fornicated with cattle. If they gave birth to a child they gave it to whomsoever they wished: “Here is your child”. And the person held a feast and accepted it. But Hephaestus eliminated this law and decreed that a man should have one wife, and that a woman should marry a single man, and that if anyone were to violate (that law), they should be thrown into a fiery furnace; this is why he was called Svarog, and the Egyptians blessed him. And after him reigned his son, called Sun, who was known as Dazhbog, for seven thousand four hundred and seventy days, which make twenty and a half years. Because neither the Egyptians (nor) others knew how to count; some counted by the moon and others counted the years by days; the figure of 12 months was known later, from the time that men began to pay tax to the emperors. The emperor Sun, son of Svarog, who is Dazhbog, was a strong man. Having heard from someone that a certain Egyptian woman, who was rich and respected, that someone wished to fornicate with her, he sought her to apprehend her so she did not break the law of her father Svarog. Taking with him some of his men, having discovered the moment at which the adultery would take place by night, he surprised her and did not find her husband with her but found her lying with another, with who she wanted. He seized her and tortured her and ordered her to be taken around the country for opprobrium and he beheaded her lover. And life was pure in all Egypt, and they began to praise him.

This source is problematic for several reasons. The first problem is place and time the glosses about Svarog and Dazhbog were included in the Slavonic translation of the Chronography. Some scholars believe that these glosses come from the 10th-century Bulgarian translator of the Chronography (the first Slavic translation in general), and some scholars assume that the glosses were added by a Ruthenian copyist. Aleksander Brückner supported this thesis by adding that the Bulgarian texts avoided mentioning Slavic or Turkic paganism in Bulgaria. Vatroslav Jagić suggested that the glosses were written in Novgorod because the Chronography translation also contains references to Lithuanian paganism, which the Bulgarian translator could not do. The downside of this theory is that the glosses must have been written before 1118 (this is probably when they first found their way into the compilation of the Primary Chronicle), and in the 11th century Ruthenian writers were not interested in Lithuanian paganism because of underdeveloped contacts with Lithuania. For this reason, Viljo Mansikka has proposed that the Baltic interpolation and glosses came into translation in 1262 in Lithuania or Western Rus. However, this explanation raises some objections: Svarog is not mentioned in any other Russian sources (unlike Dazhbog), and he is also omitted by Nikon in his list of deities worshiped by Vladimir the Great. According to Henryk Łowmiański, who identified Svarozhits with Dazhbog, an argument for the Bulgarian origin of the glosses is the fact that in these glosses Dazhbog is called "the son of Svarog" – in Bulgarian the patronymic suffix -ic, -ič has been forgotten, so that Dazhbog could not be called simply Svarozhits. If the Bulgarian origin of the glosses is recognized, Svarog must also be considered a South Slavic god, not an East Slavic one.

The second problem is that it is not clear which information in the glosses pertains to Slavic mythology and which to Greek mythology. According to the glosses Svarog is: (1) the Slavic equivalent of Hephaestus, the Greek god of fire and smithing, (2) the father of Dazhbog, and (3) the creator of monogamy. According to Andrzej Szyjewski, the myth of the adulterous wife fits Hephaestus (pagan Slavs were polygamous), whereas the myth of the blacksmith god being the father of the Sun does not appear anywhere in Greek mythology. Łowmiański believed that Hephaestus was not translated as Svarog because of his association with fire and smithing, but precisely because of his being the father of the Sun. Brückner and Dimitri Obolensky interpreted this account as a distorted myth about a blacksmith god who forged a sun disk. Such an affinity may be indicated by the Baltic parallel where Teliavelis forges the sun and casts it on the sky.

== Interpretations ==
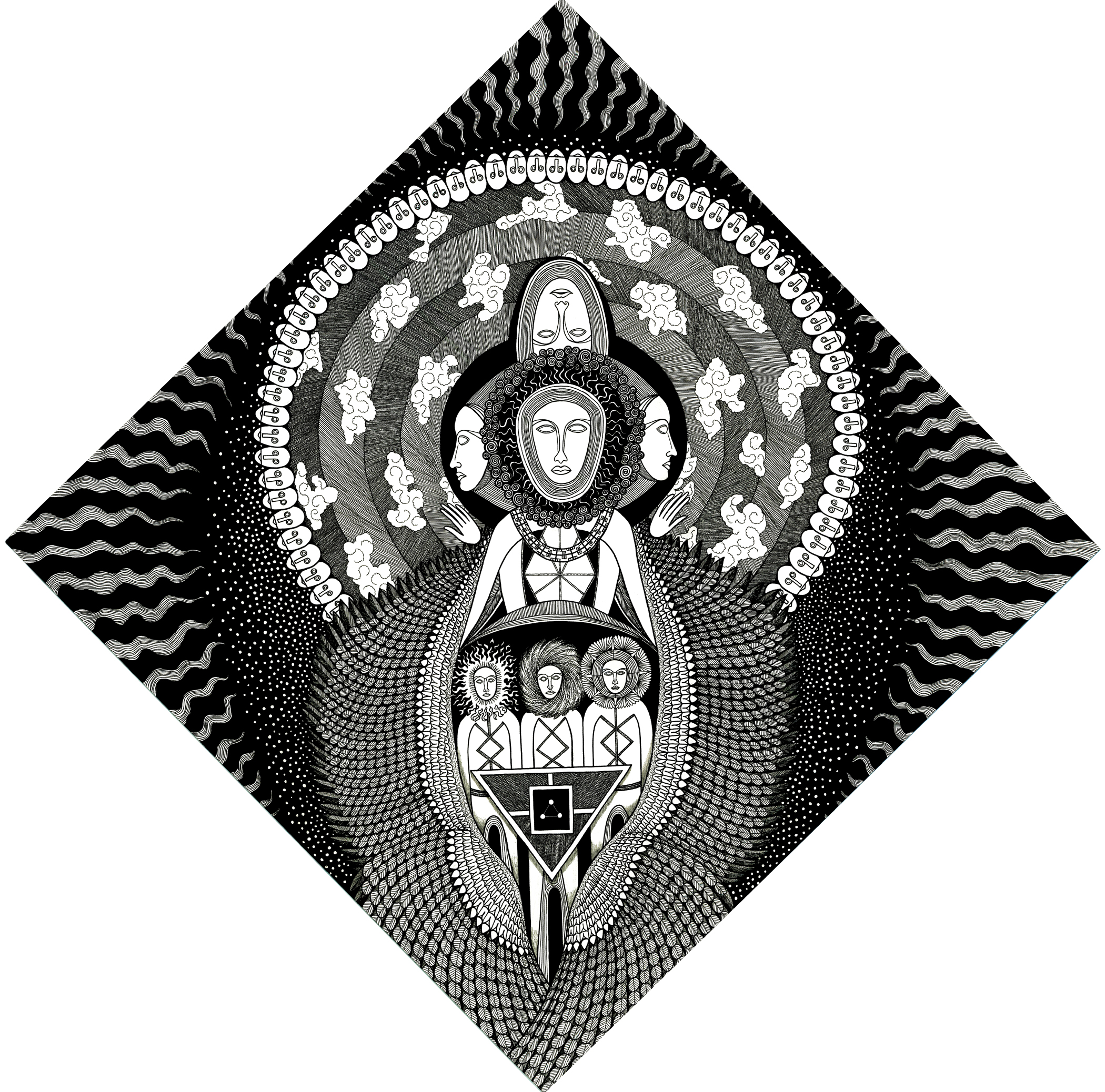
Svarog, Marek Hapon, 2013

Because it is unclear to what extent the fragmentary translation of the Chronography can be used, and because of only a single source about Svarog, as well as uncertain clues in folklore, the interpretation of this god is problematic. Some scholars have even suggested that Svarog was created from the figure of Svarozhits and never existed in the beliefs of the Slavs.

=== God of fire, blacksmithing, sun ===
Czech historians Martin Pitro and Petr Vokáč believe that Svarog is a god who receded into the background after the creation of the world, but at the same time is a celestial smith and sun god.

It is possible that Svarog echoes the mythology of northern Europe: the smith in Norse and Baltic mythology forges weapons for the Thunderer, and as in Finnish mythology, the smith god Ilmarinen is the creator of the Sun, the sky, and many wondrous objects. The smith god also fights the powers of chaos in defense of his creation.

Aleksander Gieysztor interpreted Svarog as celestial fire (the sun), Perun as atmospheric fire (the thunderbolt), and Svarozhits-Dazhbog as earthly fire (fire).

Jiří Dynda rejects the understanding of Svarog as a sovereign deity of heaven or a deus otiousus type deity, and points out that in the source Svarog, or rather his prefiguration, does not bear the characteristics of such a deity, except for the paternity of the solar deity, which he considers a secondary feature. Instead, he compares him to the figure of the magician and hero Volkh Vseslavyevich from Russian bylines, and to the ancient blacksmiths who, in Russian folklore, make weapons for heroes and weld the hair of men and women symbolically uniting them into marriage, which include, for example, the blind father of the hero Svyatogor.

It is possible that Svarog is related in some way to mythological bird Rarog (saker falcon), perhaps on the taboo basis pointed out by Roman Jakobson. In Vedism Indra is sometimes called Indra Vritrahan, "Indra the victor of Vritra". In the Iranian version of this motif, Veretragna is transformed into the falcon Varhagan during his duel with Vritra. Czech Raroh, Rarach is a generous yet vengeful demonic being associated with the campfire, taking the form of a bird or dragon, with a body and hair of flame, who flies out through the chimney as a ball of fire or whirlwind. He indicates a Balto-Slavic motif: the names raróg, rarok in Polish, jarog in Czech, and raragas or vanagas in Lithuanian refer to a bird with glowing eyes.

=== Sky god ===
On the basis of solar and celestial etymology, Svarog is often interpreted as a celestial creator deity whose role in cult mythology has been overlooked. Svarog would have been the heir of a hypothetical Proto-Indo-European *Dyḗus. In this case, he would correspond to deities such as the Vedic Dyaus or the Baltic Dievs, but also to the Greek Zeus or the Roman Jupiter – the latter two deities, however, took on thunderer characteristics and occupied an important place in their respective pantheons.

Michal Téra interprets Svarog as the counterpart of the Vedic sky-god Dyaus, who according to some accounts is the father of the fire-god Agni-Svarozhits and of the sun-god Surya-Dazhbog. He also links him to the mystical figure Svyatogor, whose place in the bylinas is taken by Ilya Muromets, Perun's heir – according to Téra described as tired, whose weight the earth cannot bear, and he compares this last motif to the mythical separation of Heaven and Earth which is necessary to put the world in order. He also believes that Svarog appears in the myths of the creation of the world.

Łowmiański developed a theory that the cult of the Proto-Indo-European god *Dyḗus developed among the Slavs in two forms: in the form of Svarog among the West Slavs, and in the form of Perun among the East Slavs. Subsequently, the cult of Svarog was to be transported in the 6th century by Serbs and Croats from West Slavs to the Balkans.

== Bibliography ==
- Alvarez-Pedroza, Juan Antonio (2021). Sources of Slavic Pre-Christian Religion. Leiden: Koninklijke Brill. ISBN 978-90-04-44138-5.
- Borissoff, Constantine Leo (2014). "Non-Iranian origin of the Eastern-Slavonic god Xŭrsŭ/Xors". Studia Mythologica Slavica. 17: 9–36. doi:10.3986/sms.v17i0.1491. ISSN 1581-128X.
- Brückner, Aleksander (1985). Mitologia słowiańska (in Polish). Warsaw: Państwowe Wydawnictwo Naukowe. ISBN 8301062452.
- Dal, Vladimir (1863). Толковый словарь живаго великорускаго языка В. И. Даля (in Russian). Vol. 1: А-З. Moscow: Общество любителей российской словесности.
- Dynda, Jirí (2019). Slovanské pohanství ve středověkých ruských kázáních (in Czech). Červený Kostelec: Scriptorium. ISBN 978-80-88013-87-7.
- Gieysztor, Aleksander (2006). Mitologia Słowian (in Polish). Warsaw: Wydawnictwa Uniwersytetu Warszawskiego. ISBN 978-83-235-0234-0.
- Łowmiański, Henryk (1979). Religia Słowian i jej upadek, w. VI-XII (in Polish). Warsaw: Państwowe Wydawnictwo Naukowe. ISBN 83-01-00033-3.
- Łuczyński, Michał (2020). Bogowie dawnych Słowian. Studium onomastyczne (in Polish). Kielce: Kieleckie Towarzystwo Naukowe. ISBN 978-83-60777-83-1.
- Miklošič, Franc (1875). Vergleichende Grammatik der slavischen Sprachen (in German). Vol. 2. Wiedeń.
- Niederle, Lubor (1924). Slovanské starožitnosti (in Czech). Vol. 1: Oddíl kulturní (2 ed.). Prague.
- Pitro, Martin; Vokáč, Petr (2002). Bohové dávných Slovanů (in Czech). Praga: ISV. ISBN 80-85866-91-9.
- Szyjewski, Andrzej (2003). Religia Słowian (in Polish). Kraków: Wydawnictwo WAM. ISBN 83-7318-205-5.
- Téra, Michal (2009). Perun: Bůh hromovládce (in Czech). Červený Kostelec: Pavel Mervart. ISBN 978-80-86818-82-5.
- Vasmer, Max (1986). "Сварог". Этимологический словарь русского языка (in Russian). Vol. 3. Translated by Trubachyov, Oleg (2 ed.). Moscow: Progress. pp. 569–570.
