= Aleksander Brückner =

Polish linguist and lexicographer

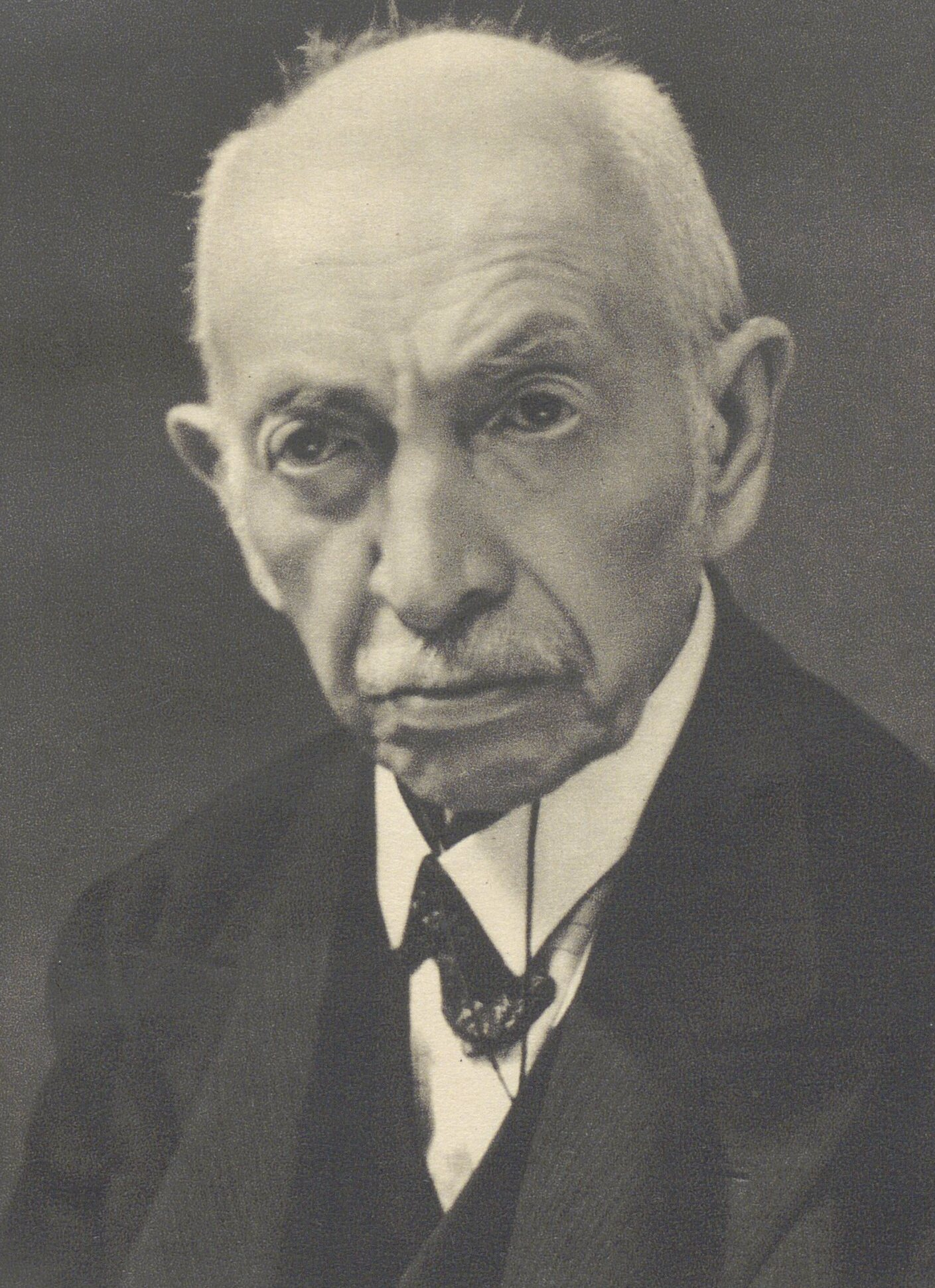
- Born: 29 January 1856; Brzeżany, Galicia, Austrian Empire (now Berezhany, Ukraine)
- Died: 24 May 1939 (aged 83); Berlin, Germany
- Occupations: Scholar of Slavic languages and literatures (Slavistics), philologist, lexicographer and historian of literature

Aleksander Brückner (Polish pronunciation: [alɛkˈsandɛr ˈbryknɛr]; 29 January 1856 – 24 May 1939) was a Polish scholar of Slavic languages and literature (Slavistics), philologist, lexicographer, and historian of literature. He is among the most notable Slavicists of the late 19th and early 20th centuries, and the first to prepare complete monographs on the history of the Polish language and culture. He published more than 1,500 titles and discovered the oldest extant prose text in Polish (the Holy Cross Sermons).

== Life ==
Brückner was born in Brzeżany (Berezhany) in Galicia, Austrian Empire, to an Austro-Polish family who had moved there from Stryj three generations earlier. He studied at the German Gymnasium in Lwów (Lemberg) under Omelian Ohonovsky, in Vienna under Franz Miklosich, and in Berlin under Vatroslav Jagić. Brückner first taught at Lwów (Lwów University). In 1876 he received a doctorate at the University of Vienna and in 1878 his habilitation for a study on Slavic settlements around Magdeburg (Die slawischen Aussiedlungen in der Altmark und im Magdeburgischen). In 1881 he received a professorship at the Berlin University, where he long held (1881–1924) the chair in Slavic Philology. He received funds for travel and studies from his University and he resided in Berlin continuously for 58 years until his death. He was a member of many learned societies, including the Polish Academy of Learning in Kraków, the Saint Petersburg Academy of Sciences, the Shevchenko Scientific Society in Lemberg, and the Bulgarian Academy of Sciences, as well as academies in Prague and Belgrade.

Brückner wrote extensively in both Polish and German on the history of the Slavic languages and literature, folklore, ancient Slavic and Baltic mythology, and the history of Polish and Russian literature. His most important works include a history of the Polish language (Lemberg, 1906), several histories of Polish literature in Polish and German, a history of Russian literature, an etymological dictionary of the Polish language (Słownik etymologiczny języka polskiego, 1927), works on Slavic and Baltic mythology, an encyclopedia of Old Poland, and a 4-volume history of Polish culture (Kraków, 1930–46). Brückner was a specialist on the older periods of Polish and Slavic culture and was the discoverer, interpreter, and publisher of the oldest known manuscript in Polish, the Holy Cross Sermons. He had an incomparable knowledge of medieval Polish literature, which he knew from the original manuscripts, and was an expert on Renaissance and early modern Polish literature.

In general, Brückner tried to raise the prestige of old Slavic culture both in the eyes of the Germans among whom he worked and in the eyes of the Poles with whom he sympathized. He was critical of the Russian autocracy and the centralized Russian state of his time, including the Russian liberals (Kadets) who supported a centralized state and opposed either federalism or national autonomy for the non-Russian peoples of the Russian Empire. During the First World War, he favored the Central Powers but opposed the Treaty of Brest-Litovsk, which he believed was largely directed against a resurgent Poland, and made deep concessions to the Ukrainians in his native eastern Galicia. It was, however, scholarship, not politics, which always remained his main concern.

On the most central questions of Slavic scholarship, he believed that in ancient times the Slavic and Baltic languages had a common ancestor and he always stressed this common Balto-Slavic bond. He placed the original homeland of the Slavs farther west than most Slavists, on the territory of today's Poland. He believed that the apostles of the Slavs, Cyril and Methodius, had originated the idea of their mission on their own, and he played down the invitation from Moravia; finally, in a polemic with the Ukrainian historian Mykhailo Hrushevsky, he took a Normanist position on the origins of the Rus', stressing the linguistic and historical evidence for a Scandinavian connection.

In 1924, he retired from the university and spent most of his time writing moved up for better chronology. After he died in Berlin, his final book, a short German-language synthesis history of Polish culture, went unpublished.

== Bibliography ==
- Aleksander Brückner 1856–1939 ed. Władysław Berbelicki (Warsaw: PWN, 1989). 318 pp. A systematic bibliography of his works in Polish, German, etc. preceded by a brief biographical introduction and several memoirs by his colleagues and friends.
- Słownik etymologiczny języka polskiego (1927)

=== Works in English ===
- A Literary History of Russia, ed. E.H. Minns, trans. H. Havelock (London: T.F. Unwin, 1908). xix, 558 pp.

=== Works in German ===
- Litu-Slavische Studien, Die Slavischen Fremdwörter im Litauischen Alexander Brückner, Weimar 1877
- Randglossen zur kaschubischen Frage, Archiv für slavische Philologie 1899
- Geschichte der russischen Litteratur, Leipzig 1905
- Russische Literaturgeschichte, 2 Bd., Berlin/Leipzig 1919
- Polnische Literaturgeschichte, Berlin/Leipzig 1920
- Geschichte der polnischen Literatur, Leipzig 1922
- Die Slaven. Religionsgeschichtliches Lesebuch, Tübingen 1926

== See also ==
- List of Poles
- Svarog
