= Słownik etymologiczny języka polskiego =

Słownik etymologiczny języka polskiego (Etymological Dictionary of the Polish Language) is an etymological dictionary first published in 1927. It was compiled by Aleksander Brückner and served through the 20th century as a principal Polish etymological dictionary.

Though now to some extent superseded by more recent efforts, it remains serviceable.

== See also ==
- Dictionary
