= Mene (goddess) =

Epithet of Selene

Mene (Ancient Greek: Μήνη, romanized: Mḗnē, lit. 'moon, month', pronounced [mɛ̌ːnɛː]), in ancient Greek religion and mythology, is an epithet of Selene, the Greek lunar goddess, as a goddess presiding over the months.

== Etymology ==
The Greek word μήνη (mēnē) means both the Moon and the lunar month. It represents the feminine form of the older masculine noun μήν (mēn), which in turn derives from the oblique stem of the Indo-European word *meh₁nōt ("moon; month"). The name of the Phrygian moon-god Men derives from the same word. Further cognates include "Moon" and "Máni."

William Smith writes of Mene as "a goddess presiding over the months". Apostolos Athanassakis and Benjamin Wolkow speculate that Selene's name, which is derived from the word σέλας (selas, "light") and thus means "luminous one", might have originally developed as a euphemism, before becoming the Moon and its goddess's proper name.

== See also ==
- Proto-Indo-European religion
- Proto-Indo-European language
- H_{2}éwsōs
- Manat (goddess)
