= Dazhbog =

Slavic deity

- Member of Vladimir's pantheon

Genealogy
- Parents: Svarog (father)
- Siblings: Svarozhits (?)

Dazhbog (Russian: Дажьбо́г, Дажбо́г), alternatively Daždźboh (Belarusian: Даждзьбог), Dazhboh (Ukrainian: Дажбог), Dažbog, Dazhdbog, Dajbog, Daybog, Dabog, Dazibogu, or Dadźbóg, was one of the major gods of Slavic mythology, most likely a solar deity and possibly a cultural hero. He is one of several authentic Slavic gods, mentioned by a number of medieval manuscripts, and one of the few Slavic gods for which evidence of worship can be found in all Slavic tribes.

Dazhbog is mentioned in the Primary Chronicle, a history of early Kievan Rus' as one of seven gods whose statues Prince Vladimir the Great erected in front of his palace in Kiev in 980, when he came to the throne. The name is also mentioned in the Hypatian Codex, as well as in the medieval Old East Slavic epic The Tale of Igor's Campaign .

== Etymology ==
The Proto-Slavic reconstruction is *dadjьbogъ, and is composed of *dadjь, imperative of the verb *dati "to give", and the noun *bogъ "god". The original meaning of Dazhbog would thus, according to Dubenskij, Ognovskij and Niederle, be "giving god", "god-giver, "god-donor".

This word is an old compound, that is particularly interesting because it retains the old meaning of the Proto-Slavic *bogъ "earthly wealth/well-being; fortune", with a semantic shift to "dispenser of wealth/fortune" and finally "god". Due to the absence of convincing cognates in other Indo-European languages, Proto-Slavic *bogъ is often considered to be an Iranian borrowing, being related to Indo-Iranian Bhaga, or at least being semantically influenced by them; in both Slavic and Indo-Iranian cognate forms mean both "deity" and "wealth, share". Thus, translated literally, Dazhbog would be "giving god".

In other languages, Proto-Slavic: *Daďьbogъ; Church Slavonic: Даждьбогъ; Old East Slavic: Дажьбогъ; Belarusian: Даждбог, Дажбог, or Дабог; Bulgarian, Ukrainian and Macedonian: Даждбог Дажбог, Дайбог, or Дабог; Polish: Dadźbóg, Dażbóg, Dabóg; Russian: Дажьбог, Дажбог, Дайбог, or Дабог; Serbo-Croatian: Daždbog / Даждбог, Dažbog / Дажбог, Dajbog / Дајбог, or Dabog / Дабог.

== Characteristics ==
One passage about Dazhbog comes from the Hypatian Codex, a 15th-century compilation of several much older documents from the Ipatiev Monastery in Russia. The complete passage, reconstructed from several manuscripts, translates as follows:

[Then] began his reign Feosta (Hephaestus), whom the Egyptians called Svarog ... during his rule, from the heavens fell the smith's prongs and weapons were forged for the first time; before that, [all] fought with clubs and stones. Feosta also commanded the women that they should have only a single husband ... and that is why Egyptians called him Svarog ... After him ruled his son; his name was the Sun, and they called him Dazhbog ... Sun tsar, son of Svarog. That is Dazhbog.

This is, in fact, a Slavic translation of an original Greek manuscript of Malalin from the 6th century. In the Greek text, the names of gods are Hephaestus and Helios. Apparently, the unknown Rus translator tried to re-tell the entire story (set in Egypt) by replacing the names of classical deities with those that were better known to his readers.

One can only hope that he indeed replaced the names of Greek gods with their fitting Slavic counterparts; however, at least one issue remains problematic: in all Slavic languages, the word for Sun, Suntse, is of neutral or feminine gender, never masculine (however, there is an Old East Slavic epic character "Vladimir Beautiful Sun" or "Vladimir Bright Sun" (ru) which has the same place as Arthur in English culture).

Also, in Baltic mythology, which is most akin to Slavic, Sun is a female deity, Saule, while the Moon is a male one. The same pattern can be observed in the folklore of many Slavic nations, where the Sun is most often identified with mother or a bride, and Moon with father or husband, their children being the stars. Where exactly this leaves Dazhbog as a possible male solar deity of Slavic pantheon remains questionable.

Furthermore, this passage has raised quite a few theories about family relations between Slavic gods. If we assume that indeed Svarog was believed to be Dazhbog's father, the question arises of his relation with Svarozhits, another deity who is mentioned as a god of fire and war in several other medieval documents describing the pagan beliefs of Slavs. Svarozhits is simply a diminutive of Svarog's name, i.e., "little Svarog", which implicates he was considered a child of Svarog. Vyacheslav Ivanov and Vladimir Toporov proposed a reconstruction of this mythical genealogy that Svarog, a deity of fire and forge similar to the Greek Hephaestus, had two sons; Dazhbog, who represented the fire in the sky (i.e., the Sun), and Svarozhits, who symbolised the flame on earth, in the forge.

Henryk Łowmiański, however, theorised that Svarog was a Slavic sky god and personification of daylight sky itself, possibly a continuation of Proto-Indo-European *Dyēus Ph_{2}ter, while Svarozhits and solar Dazhbog were the same deity, though, he concluded, two other aspects of Svarozhits also existed: fiery Svarozhits, as in the Sun (mentioned in Old East Slavic medieval manuscripts), and lunar Svarozhits, associated with the Moon. Film director and controversial amateur mythologist Franjo Ledić, on the other hand, assumed that Svarog and Dazhbog are the same god.

=== Relationship to Khors ===
Many mythologists also believe Dazhbog to be identical with another East Slavic deity with possible solar attributes, Khors. Osip Maximovich Bodjanskij based this theory on the following passage from Primary Chronicle:

And Vladimir began his reign in Kiev alone and erected idols on the hill outside his palace with porch: Perun of wood with a head of silver and moustache of gold and Khors Dazhbog and Stribog and Simargl and Mokosh.

The names Khors and Dazhbog are the only two not clearly separated by the word "and" in the text. It is possible this indicates a compound deity, Khors Dazhbog. On this basis, Toporov assumed that Khors could be an Iranian (possibly Sarmatian or Scythian) name for this god, and Dazhbog a Slavic one. Boris Rybakov compared Khors and Dazhbog to Helios and Apollo, respectively, concluding that both of them were solar gods, but while Khors represented the Sun itself, Dazhbog, as deus dator, rather symbolised the life-giving power of the Sun. That Khors was indeed a solar deity was deduced from the following passage in the Tale of Igor's Campaign:

Vseslav the prince judged men; as prince, he ruled towns; but at night he prowled in the guise of a wolf. From Kiev, prowling, he reached, before the cocks crew, Tmutorokan. The path of great Khors, as a wolf, prowling, he crossed.

In other words, prince Vseslav reached Tmutorokan before dawn, thus crossing the path of Khors, the Sun. In the mythical view of the world, the Sun has to pass through the underworld during the night to reach the eastern horizon by the dawn. This, and the fact that prince Vseslav is transformed into a wolf during the night, while "crossing the path of Khors", draws a parallel with the Serbian Dabog, who, as stated already, was believed to be a lame "wolf shepherd" who rules over the underworld.

Of particular interest is the fact that Serbian folk accounts describe him as being lame; lameness was a standing attribute of Greek Hephaestus, whom, as we have seen, the Hypatian Codex compared with Slavic smith-god Svarog, father of Dazhbog. (In fact, most of Indo-European smith-gods were lame; the reason for this was most likely arsenicosis, low levels of arsenic poisoning, resulting in lameness and skin cancers. Arsenic was added to bronze to harden it, and most smiths of the Bronze Age would have suffered from chronic workplace poisoning.)

Serbian Dabog, being lord of the underworld, was also associated with precious metals, and sometimes was said to have a silver beard. Serbian scholar Veselin Čajkanović concluded that the chthonic character of Dabog in Serbian folklore fits very nicely with the solar Dazhbog mentioned in Old East Slavic sources, pointing out that in numerous mythologies, solar deities tend to have double aspects, one benevolent, associated with the Sun during the day, and the other malevolent, associated with night, when the Sun is trapped in the underworld.

In his studies of Serbian folklore, Čajkanović also concluded that many more benevolent aspects of Dazhbog were passed on to popular saints in folk Christianity, in particularly onto St. Sava, Serbian national saint, who, although undoubtedly was a real historical person, in folk tales often appears in the role of culture hero. The fact that in the Tale of Igor's Campaign, the Rus and their princes are being referred to as "Dazhbog's grandchildren", indicates that Dazhbog was considered as an ancestral deity, a common role of a culture hero archetype in mythologies.

== In modern culture ==
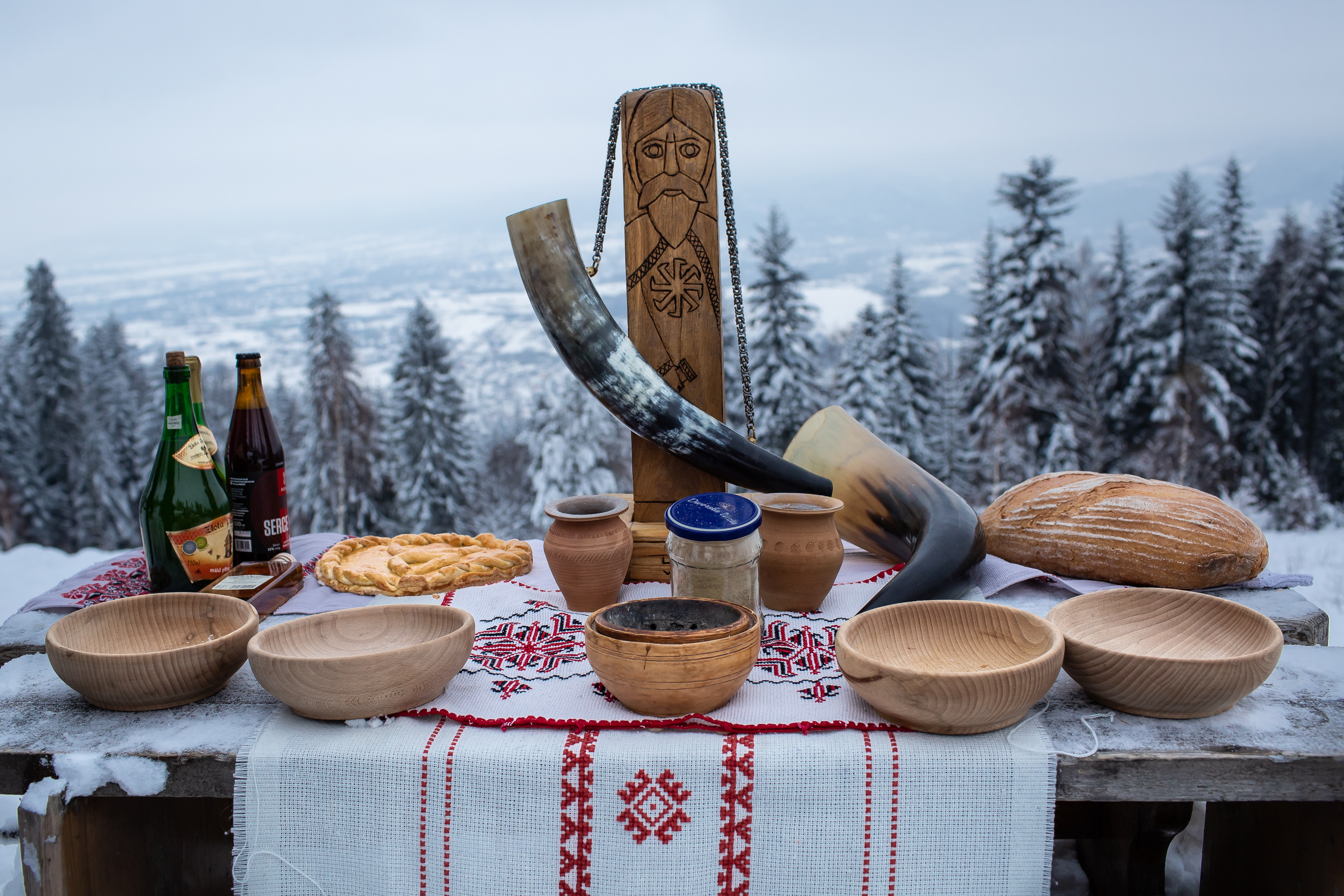
A 2018 neopagan altar with depiction of Dazhbog by Polish Rodnovers

A sculpture of the god was erected in Hola Prystan, Ukraine early in 2001. Some days later, it was broken up due to the objections by the church.

On April 10, 2016, a Dazhdbog idol was installed by the Slavic pagans in a particularly revered place in the city of Astrakhan, Russia. On April 12, 2016, information about the desecration of idols and destruction all the adjacent territories had become known.

== See also ==
- Svarog
- Hephaestus
- Culture hero
- Heimdall
- List of solar deities
