= Jiří Dynda =

Czech researcher with interests in religious studies, folklore and medieval studies

Jiří Dynda (born 1988) is a Czech researcher with interests in religious studies, folklore and medieval studies.

As of 2023 he is with the Institute of Slavonic Studies of the Academy of Sciences of the Czech Republic.

In 2021 he earned his Ph.D. from the Faculty of Arts, Charles University, thesis: "Gods and Demons: The Construction of the Slavic Paganism in the Medieval Textual Sources".

== Monographs ==
- Slovanské pohanství ve středověkých ruských kázáních. Praha: Scriptorium, 2019 ISBN 978-80-88013-87-7.
- Slovanské pohanství ve středověkých latinských pramenech. Praha: Scriptorium, 2017, 2023 ISBN 978-80-88013-52-5; 978-80-7649-050-5.
- Svjatogor : smrt a iniciace staroruského bohatýra. Červený Kostelec: Pavel Mervart ISBN 978-80-7465-242-4.
- (editor, with others) Staré baby : ženy a čas ve středověké Evropě. Praha: Nakladatelství Lidové noviny 2021 ISBN 978-80-7422-786-8.

== Awards ==
- 2023: Otto Wichterle Prize of the Academy of Sciences of the Czech Republic, in humanities and social sciences
- 2022: Award of the Learned Society of the Czech Republic in the "junior researcher" category for outstanding scientific contribution in the field of Paleo-Slavic studies and research into the pre-Christian religion of the Slavs
