= Lubor Niederle =

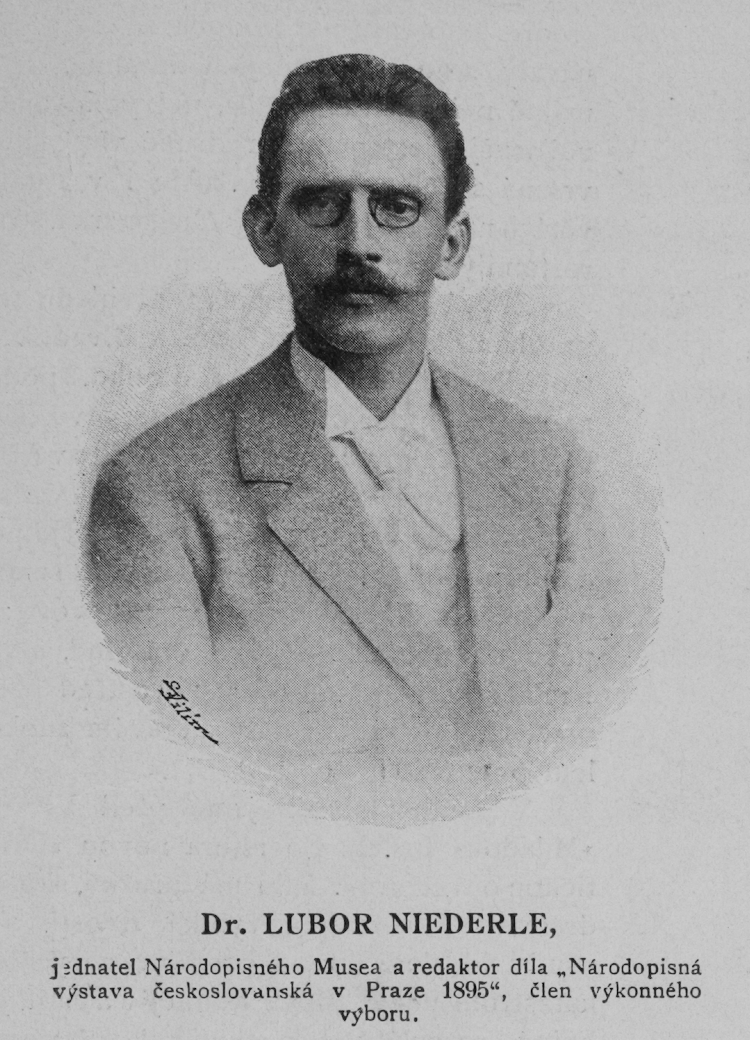
- Niederle in 1895
- Born: 20 September 1865; Klatovy, Bohemia, Austrian Empire
- Died: 14 June 1944 (aged 78); Prague, Czechoslovakia
- Education: Charles University
- Occupation: ethnographer

Lubor Niederle (20 September 1865 – 14 June 1944) was a Czech archaeologist, anthropologist and ethnographer. He is seen as one of the founders of modern archaeology in the Czech lands.

== Life ==
He was born in Klatovy. He studied at the Charles University in Prague from 1883 to 1887. He was initially interested in classical archaeology, then studied anthropology, sociology and ethnology. Later, he studied at the Ludwig-Maximilians-Universität München under professor Johannes Ranke (1889) and at the University of Paris under professor Léonce Manouvriere at the École d'anthropologie. Niederle also travelled in several Slavic countries, studying archaeological findings and historical documents.

In 1898, Niederle was named professor at the Charles University. As an archaeologist, he had represented the "university school" (univerzitní škola), opposed to the "museum school" (muzejní škola) represented by archaeologist Josef Ladislav Píč.

From 1907 to 1908, Niederle served as a dean of Faculty of Philosophy, from 1908 to 1909 as a vice-dean and from 1927 to 1928 as a rector of the faculty. In 1919, he helped to establish State Archaeological Institute (Státní archeologický ústav), today's Institute of Archaeology (Archeologický ústav). He also published many articles about Slavic ethnography and archaeology and was editor of several specialised journals. Niederle had helped to set up Institute of Slavonic Studies (Slovanský ústav) in Prague and directed it from 1928 until 1931.

Among his most-known works are Handbook of Czech Archaeology (Rukověť české archeologie, 1910, with Karel Buchtela) and mainly the eleven-volume series Slavic Antiquities (Slovanské starožitnosti) published between 1902 and 1934. This series exhaustively investigated origin and prehistory of the Slavs, continuing earlier work by historian Pavel Josef Šafařík.

Niederle died on 14 June 1944 in Prague.
