= Dobrokhotov =

Dobrokhotov (Russian: Доброхотов), feminine: Dobrokhotova is a Russian surname.

Notable people with the surname include:

- Alexander Dobrokhotov (born 1950), Russian philosopher and historian
- Gennady Dobrokhotov (1948–2025), Soviet boxer
- Nikolay Dobrokhotov (1889–1963), Soviet scientist and metallurgist
- Roman Dobrokhotov (born 1983), Russian journalist
- Yaroslav Dobrokhotov
