= Sergei Davidis =

Russian lawyer and sociologist

Sergei Konstantinovich Davidis
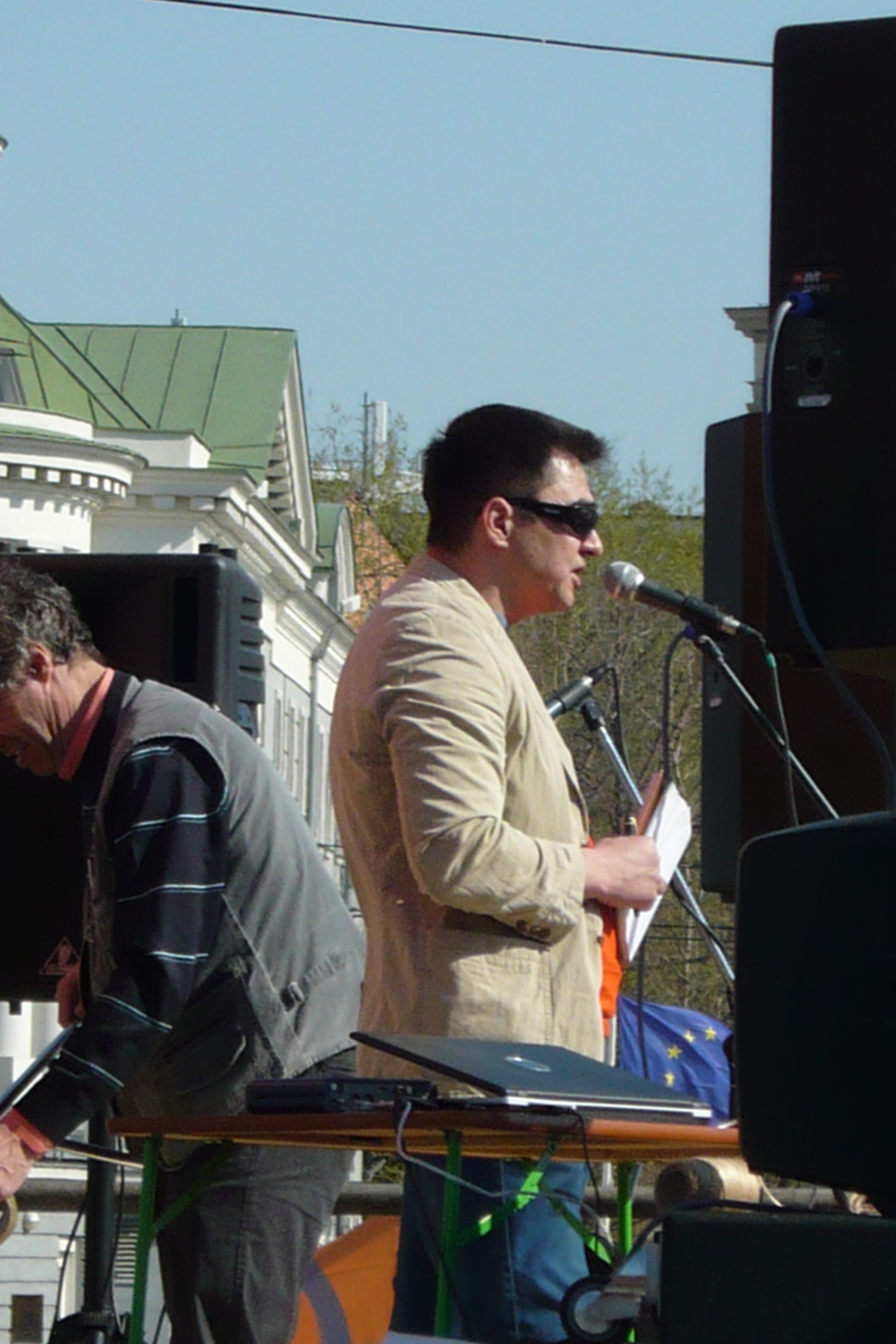
- Born: January 29, 1969 (age 57); Moscow
- Organization: Memorial (society)
- Political party: Solidarnost since 2008
- Other political affiliations: 5th of December Party since 2012

Sergei Konstantinovicz Davidis (Russian: Сергей Константинович Давидис) (born January 29, 1969), is a Russian lawyer, sociologist, and human rights activist.

== Biography ==
=== Early life and education ===
He was born in a family of engineers. In 1986, he graduated from a school in Shchukino District (North-Western Administrative Okrug). Between 1987 and 1989, he did his military service on North Caucasus. In 1995, he graduated from Sociology department of Moscow State University and in 2008 from Kutafin Moscow State Law University, specialising in Public Communication and Election Campaigns Organisation.

=== Activism in Russia ===
In late 1980s and early 90s, he was active in Moscow prodemocratic movement – between 1989 and 1994 he was a part of social democratic Samizdat "New life". In 1990, he joined the Democratic Union, founded by, among others, Garry Kasparov, yet he wasn't an active member. In the same year, joined by Gleb Cherkasov, Anna Karetnikova and Stanislav Duknevich, he created a Youth solidarity Party "Echo" committee. He has also been a member of the Moscow students club (Московский Студенческий Клуб), which, back in the days, actively participated in political life, for example by organising demonstrations for eliminating mandatory teaching of Marxism–Leninism or protests calling for the liquidation of the KGB.

During next few years, he backed off from public life, focusing on family and developing his consulting company. At the beginning of 2000, as Vladimir Putin came to power, Davidis returned to public activity. Since 2003, he participated in establishing an antiwar movement "Aniwar club" (Антивоенный клуб). During 2003 Russian parliamentary election he was arrested for "election interference" and spent a month in pre-trial detention centre.

In 2008, Davidis was one of the creators of Union of Solidarity with Political Prisoners – Союза солидарности с политзаключенными (ССП), and after that, he became one of Union's representatives to National Assembly of Russia.

In December 2008, he participated in a founding conference for Solidarnost party, where he was appointed a member of its political bureau. In 2009, he became a member of political council of Solidarnost Moscow branch.

In 2009, he has also been one of the Memorial representatives during the case "Oleg Orlov vs Ramzan Kadyrov". Kadyrov filed a lawsuit against Orlov after the latter pointed to Kadyrov as the mastermind behind Natalya Estemirova killing (Natalia was an activist in Memorial, a teacher and a journalist).

In 2010, as a member of Memorial, Davidis established a Political Prisoners Support Program operating within the Memorial – he is the head of the program till now. He is also a member of the board of the organisation.

He was one of the organisers of 2011–2013 Russian protests, known as a "Snow Revolution" – protests and marches expressing public anger because of election frauds. In 2011 Russian legislative election United Russia party allegedly received 49,32% of votes. Voters reported 1100 cases of the violation of the electoral law, yet Central Election Commission recognised most of them as "unconfirmed". Few days later Davidis, Roman Dobrokhotov, Denis Bolunov, Konstantin Yankauskas and Natalia Pelevine founded 5th of December Party.

Russian Opposition Coordination Council, established in October 2012, was a response to the mass character of the Snow Revolution protest. Its task was to coordinate and support the communication of groups opposing the Kremlin government. The council consisted of 45 representatives, named after the public elections, in which 70 thousand people participated. The first set of councillors comprised both people who were not politically active back then (among others, Alexei Navalny, Garry Kasparov, Boris Nemtsov, Vladimir Kara-Murza) and politicians. Davidis represented the liberal wing and in 2013 was elected the head of the Council.

In 2014, after Annexation of Crimea by the Russian Federation and the beginning of military campaign, Davidis co-organised anti-war peace marches in Moscow. In 2015, he was one of the participants in democratic opposition forum – opposition activists presented their strategy for upcoming 2016 Russian legislative election and pointed to Mikhail Kasyanov as the opposition "number one". In 2016, he was one of the organisers of a Moscow anti-war march, expressing public disapproval for military involvement of Russia in the war in Syria. City authorities didn't agree to the march in the proposed route, while (against the regulations) not offering another place for it. In 2018, that decision was deemed against the law by Supreme Court of Russia. In 2019, Davidis became a fellow of Galina Starovoytova program in Woodrow Wilson International Center for Scholars. In April 2021, Davidis reposted a post on X (formerly known as Twitter), inviting to a Alexei Navalny support march. A week later, he was arrested in the hallway of the building he lived in, transferred to Shchukino police station, where he was kept for two days without a court decision. After those two days, court sentenced him for 10 days of prison for "organising a public event without filing a notice". Many organisations, among others International Federation for Human Rights, Committee Against Torture, Firs Line Defenders, OMCT, called for his immediate release.

Despite those experiences, in March 2022, Davidis stepped forward as a witness of the defence in Alexei Navalny trial. A few days later, due to increasing danger and because of virtual inability to fulfill his task of supporting political prisoners while in Russia, Davidis decided to leave the country with his wife and teenage daughter.

=== Activity in Lithuania ===
Currently, Davidis lives in Lithuania, where he continues to work supporting political prisoners, gives multiple interviews, speaks on international conferences organised by European People's Party, PEN America, European Human Rights Dialogue.
