= Aron Gurevich =

Russian historian (1924–2006)

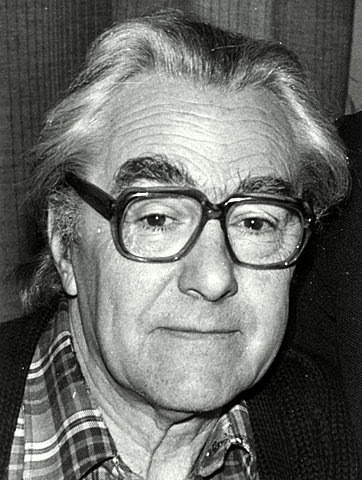

Aron Yakovlevich Gurevich (also spelled Aaron Gurevich Russian: Аро́н Я́ковлевич Гуре́вич; May 12, 1924 – August 5, 2006) was a Russian medievalist historian, working on the European culture of the Middle Ages.

Gurevich's work was informed by Jacques Le Goff and Georges Duby, and he considered himself a member of their Annales School. He was also influenced by ideas of Mikhail Bakhtin, challenging some of them at the same time. Gurevich's work was considered anti-Marxist and met with hostility in the Soviet Union, but enjoyed support abroad among the Annales School, although he was not allowed to travel abroad before Perestroika. He won the 1988 International Nonino Prize in Italy.

== Life and career ==
Aron Gurevich was born in Moscow on May 12, 1924, to a secular Jewish family. In 1946 he graduated from the Moscow State University. He initially specialized in Scandinavian languages. In 1950 after defending his dissertation Peasantry of South-Eastern England during the pre-Norman period he became a Candidate of Sciences and a lecturer of Kalinin State Pedagogical Institute (now Tver State University), a provincial posting he was relegated to, and which he held from 1950 until 1964. In 1962 Gurevich received a Doktor nauk degree at Leningrad University. His doctoral thesis was Overview of Norway's social history in IX–XII centuries. It was the first doctoral thesis in Soviet Union completely dedicated to Viking history. His career would suffer notably from the fact that he was Jewish, something that spelled considerable difficulties for scholars within the Soviet Union at that time.

Aron Gurevich returned to Kalinin and became a professor in 1963.

In 1966 Gurevich joined Moscow Institute of Philosophy, but he was fired after publishing Problems in the Origins of Feudalism in Western Europe (Problemy genezisa feodalizma v zapadnoi Evrope(1970)), where he contested the theory on origins of feudalism adopted in Marxist historiography, and was denounced for his employment of structuralist methods. Thereafter on he was barred from academic teaching. He was employed in the Information Department of the Institute for World History in Moscow until 1992. He won the 1988 International Nonino Prize in Italy.

In 1989 during Perestroika Gurevich was allowed to exit the country for the first time, and he lectured abroad in 1989–1991.

In 1993 he became a head of the Institute of the World History at the Moscow State University.

In 1998 he became a foreign member of the Royal Netherlands Academy of Arts and Sciences.

== Publications ==
- Gurevich A. J. Categories of Medieval culture. Trans. by G. L. Campbell. London: Routledge & Kegan Paul, 1985. ISBN 0-7100-9578-3
- Gurevich, Aron. Medieval Popular Culture: Problems of Belief and Perception. Trans. by János M. Bak & Paul A. Hollingsworth. Cambridge: Cambridge University Press, 1990. ISBN 0-521-38658-6

Bornstein, Daniel. Review of Medieval Popular Culture: Problems of Belief and Perception by Aron Gurevich; János M. Bak; Paul A. Hollingsworth. Church History, Vol. 59, No. 2 (Jun., 1990), pp. 234–235.
Van Engen, John. Review of Medieval Popular Culture: Problems of Belief and Perception by Aron Gurevich. Journal of Social History, Vol. 24, No. 1 (Autumn, 1990), pp. 164–167.
Madigan, Kevin. Review of Medieval Popular Culture: Problems of Belief and Perception by Aron Gurevich; Janos M. Bak; Paul A. Hollingsworth. The Journal of Religion, Vol. 70, No. 2 (Apr., 1990), pp. 254–255.

- Gurevich, Aaron. Historical Anthropology of the Middle Ages. Ed. by J. Howlett. Chicago: University of Chicago Press, 1992. ISBN 0-226-31083-3

Carruthers, Mary J. Review of Historical Anthropology of the Middle Ages by Aaron Gurevich; Jana Howlett. The American Historical Review, Vol. 98, No. 4 (Oct., 1993), pp. 1220.
Wylie, Jonathan. Review of Historical Anthropology of the Middle Ages by Aaron Gurevich. Ethnohistory, Vol. 41, No. 2 (Spring, 1994), pp. 331–333.

- Gurevich, Aaron. The Origins of European Individualism. Trans. by K. Judelson. Oxford: Blackwell, 1995. ISBN 0-631-17963-1

== See also ==
- Culturology
- Alexander Dobrokhotov
- Vyacheslav Ivanov (philologist)
- Mikhail Gasparov
