= Mikhail Gasparov =

Russian philologist and translator (1935–2005)

- Михаил Леонович Гаспаров
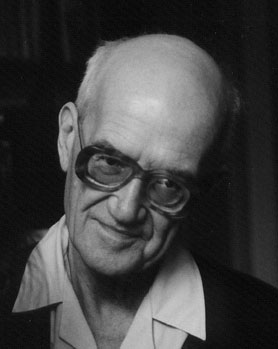
- Gasparov in 1995
- Born: 13 April 1935; Moscow
- Died: 7 November 2005 (aged 70); Moscow
- Resting place: Miusskoye cemetery
- Citizenship: Soviet; Russia
- Education: Moscow State University
- Occupations: Philologist, translator
- Awards: State Prize of the Russian Federation

Mikhail Leonovich Gasparov (Russian: Михаи́л Лео́нович Гаспа́ров, April 13, 1935 in Moscow – November 7, 2005 in Moscow) was a Russian philologist and translator, renowned for his studies in classical philology and the history of versification, and a member of the informal Tartu-Moscow Semiotic School. He graduated from Moscow State University in 1957 and worked at the Gorky Institute of World Literature, the Russian State University for the Humanities, and the Russian Language Institute in Moscow. In 1992 Gasparov was elected a full member of the Russian Academy of Science.

In 1995, Mikhail Gasparov was awarded the State Prize of the Russian Federation.

In 1997, he shared the Little Booker Prize with Aleksandr Goldstein for their publications analysing Russian literature from a historical-philosophical point of view.

In 1999, Gasparov was awarded the Andrei Bely Prize for his essay collection Notes and excerpts (Russian: Записи и выписки). Gasparov was also a poet. He published translations of classical and modern European poetry, yet only one of his own poems was published during his lifetime.

Gasparov was a member of the editorial board of Literary Monuments (Russian: Литературные памятники) book series, journals Journal of Ancient History (Russian: Вестник древней истории), Literary Research (Russian: Литературоведение), Elementa (United States), and Rossica Romana (Italy).

Mikhail Gasparov published about 300 articles, translations and other works, including the monographs Fable in Antiquity (Russian: Античная литературная басня, 1971), Modern Russian Versification (Russian: Современный русский стих. Метрика и ритмика, 1974), Overview of the History of Russian Versification (Russian: Очерк истории русского стиха: Метрика, ритмика, рифма, строфика, 1984), Overview of the History of European Versification (Russian: Очерк истории европейского стиха, 1989).

During his last years Gasparov was actively engaged in publishing the collected works of the Russian poet Osip Mandelstam. On April 10, 2005, three days before his seventieth birthday, he was baptized according to the Russian Orthodox rite. He died on November 7, 2005 and was buried next to his mother at the Miusskoye cemetery in Moscow.

Commemorating Mikhail Gasparov, the Russian State University for the Humanities organises annual conferences dedicated to the main fields of Gasparov's academic research -- classical philology and Russian literature of the 19th and early 20th centuries.

== Publications ==
=== Books ===
- Gasparov M. L. A history of European versification (transl. by G. S. Smith & Marina Tarlinskaja). Oxford: Clarendon Press, 1996. ISBN 0-19-815879-3.

- West, M. L. Review of A history of European versification by M. L. Gasparov; G. S. Smith; M. Tarlinskaja. The classical review, New Series, Vol. 47, No. 2 (1997), pp. 431-432.
- Pensom, Roger. Review of A history of European versification by M. L. Gasparov; G. S. Smith; M. Tarlinskaya. The modern language review, Vol. 94, No. 1 (Jan., 1999), pp. 284-285.

- Gasparov, M. Storia del verso europeo (transl. by S. Garzonio). Bologna: Il Mulino, 1993.

=== Articles in periodicals ===
- Gasparov, Michail (2020). "L'anno 1905 e l'evoluzione metrica di Blok, Brjusov e Belyj". eSamizdat. 13: 427–432.
- Gasparov, Mikhail L. (2019). "The evolution of Russian rhyme". Journal of Literary Theory. 13 (1): 77–115. doi:10.1515/jlt-2019-0003. S2CID 151001595.
- Gasparov, Mikhail; Wachtel, Michael (2018). "The semantic aura of Pushkin's trochaic tetrameter". Pushkin Review. 20: 55–66. doi:10.1353/pnr.2018.0003. JSTOR 48604238. S2CID 192525511.
- Tarlinskaja, Marina; Rudnev, Pyotr; Lotman, Mihhail; Gasparov, Mikhail (2017). "Approaches to verse theory in the works of Jaak Põldmäe". Studia Metrica et Poetica. 4 (1): 130–149. doi:10.12697/smp.2017.4.1.06.
- Gasparov, Mikhail (2016). "Boris Yarkho's works on literary theory". Studia Metrica et Poetica. 3 (2): 130–150. doi:10.12697/smp.2016.3.2.05.
- Gasparov, M. L.; Wachtel, Michael (2015). "On Bakhtin, philosophy, and philology: two essays". PMLA. 130 (1): 129–142. doi:10.1632/pmla.2015.130.1.129. JSTOR 44015690. S2CID 161278172.
- Gasparov, M. L.; Tarlinskaja, Marina (2008). "The linguistics of verse". The Slavic and East European Journal. 52 (2): 198–207. JSTOR 20459662.
- Gasparov, M. L. (1999). "Private experiments in translation". Russian Studies in Literature. 35 (3): 82–92. doi:10.2753/RSL1061-1975350382.
- Gasparov, M. L. (1996). "The semantic halo of the Russian trochaic pentameter: thirty years of the problem". Elementa. 2 (3–4): 191–214.
- Gasparov, M. L. (1995). "Criticism as a goal in itself". Russian Studies in Literature. 31 (4): 36–40. doi:10.2753/RSL1061-1975310436.
- Gasparov, M. L. (1993). "Incompleteness and symmetry in Herodotus' History". Культурология: The Petersburg Journal of Cultural Studies. 1 (1): 42–49.
- Gasparov, M. L. (1993). "First reading and re-reading: On Tynyanov's concept of Successivity of Speech in Verse". Культурология: The Petersburg Journal of Cultural Studies. 1 (3): 22–31.
- Gasparov, M. L.; Smirin, V. M. (1993). "Evgenii Onegin and the little house in Kolomna: Pushkin's use of parody and self-parody". The Pushkin Journal. 1 (1): 57–68. JSTOR 43791013.
- Gasparov, M. L. (1993). "M.M. Bajtín en la cultura rusa del siglo XX". Criterios (Edición Especial): 19–22.
- Gasparov, Mikhail L. (1992). "Juxtalinéaire et mesure de l'exactitude" (PDF). Meta: Journal des traducteurs / Meta: Translators' Journal. 37 (1): 50–58.
- Gasparov, M. L.; Tarlinskaja, Marina (1987). "A probability model of verse (English, Latin, French, Italian, Spanish, Portuguese)". Style. 21 (3): 322–358. JSTOR 42946210.
- Gasparov, M. L. (1984). "M. M. Bakhtin in Russian culture of the twentieth century (Translated by Ann Shukman)". Studies in 20th Century Literature. 9 (1): 169–176. doi:10.4148/2334-4415.1158.
- Gasparov, M. L. (1963). "Statistical investigation of Russian dolnik trimeter". Theory of Probability & Its Applications. 8 (1): 96–102. doi:10.1137/1108009.

=== Contributions to books ===
- 'Columbus's egg, or the structure of the novella', in Persistent forms: explorations in historical poetics, ed. I. Kliger, B. Maslov. New York, 2016, 392–396
- 'An anthology without names: 88 contemporary poems selected by Z. Gippius', in Liber, fragmenta, libellus prima e dopo Petrarca: in ricordo di D'Arco Silvio Avalle: seminario internazionale di studi, Bergamo, 23-25 ottobre 2003, ed. F. Lo Monaco, L. C. Rossi, N. Scaffai. Firenze, 2006, 405–409
- 'Introduzione', in Il verso europeo. Atti del seminario di metrica comparata (4 maggio 1994), ed. F. Stella. Firenze, 1995, 13-16
- (with M.L. Andreev, S.S. Averintsev, P.A. Grintser, A.V. Mikhailov) ‘Literary epochs and types of artistic consciousness’ in Историческая поэтика. Литературные эпохи и типы художественного сознания, ed. P.A. Grintser. Москва, 1994, 481-509
- 'Quantitative methods in Russian metrics: achievements and prospects', in Metre, rhythm, stanza, rhyme, ed. G. Smith. Colchester, 1980. (Russian Poetics in Translation, 7), 1–19
- 'Light and heavy verse lines', in Metre, rhythm, stanza, rhyme, ed. G. Smith. Colchester, 1980. (Russian Poetics in Translation, 7), 31–44
- 'Towards an analysis of Russian inexact rhyme', in Metre, rhythm, stanza, rhyme, ed. G. Smith. Colchester, 1980. (Russian Poetics in Translation, 7), 61–75

== Bibliography ==
- Wachtel, Michael (2006). Mikhail Leonovich Gasparov (13 April 1935-7 November 2005). Slavonica 12 (1), 73–76.
- Emerson, C. ' In Honor of Mikhail Gasparov's Quarter-Century of Not Liking Bakhtin: Pro and Contra', in Poetics. Self. Place. Essays in Honor of Anna Lisa Crone , ed. C. O’Neil, N. Boudreau, S. Krive (Slavica Publishers, 2007), 26–49
- Kirschbaum, H. (2008) 'The Poetics of Paraphrase: The Positivist Postmodernism in Mikhail Gasparov’s “Experimental Translations”', in Russian Language Journal 58 (1): 47–68
- Frontiers in Comparative Prosody. In memoriam: Mikhail Gasparov , ed. M. Lotman, M.-K. Lotman. Bern, Berlin, Bruxelles, 2011 ISBN 9783034303736
- Emerson, C. (2016) 'Creative ways of not liking Bakhtin: Lydia Ginzburg and Mikhail Gasparov'. Bakhtiniana 11 (1): 39–69

== See also ==
- Culturology
- Vyacheslav Ivanov (philologist)
- Aron Gurevich
- Alexander Dobrokhotov
