= Rybachenko =

Rybachenko is a surname of Ukrainian origin. It is a patronymic derivation from surname/nickname Rybak, the latter literally meaning "fisherman".

Notable people with this surname include:

- Anastasia Rybachenko
- Mikhail Rybachenko, a boy whose murder inspired the Kishinev pogrom of Jews in 1903
