= Kompromat =

Russian phrase for compromising information

- Russian: компромат
- Romanization: kompromat
- IPA: [kəmprɐˈmat]
- Literal meaning: compromising material

Kompromat (Russian: компромат, pronounced [kəmprɐˈmat]) is damaging information about a person or a group, commonly a politician, businessperson, or other public figure, which may be used for negative campaigning or smear campaigning to discredit the person or group. It can also be used for blackmail purposes, often to exert influence over a person rather than for monetary gain, and extortion. The dissemination of kompromat is a key tactic in "dark PR" or "black PR" campaigns. Kompromat may be acquired from security agencies or intelligence agencies, or outright forged, and then publicized, e.g., via a public relations official.

== Etymology ==
The term kompromat is a portmanteau of the Russian phrase for "compromising material" (Russian: компрометирующий материал, romanized: komprometiruyushchiy material). The term originates from 1930s Stalin era secret police (NKVD) jargon. Although its roots lie in early Soviet security practices, the word entered widespread public use in Russia only in the late 1980s and 1990s amidst the emergence of independent media and private business. According to the Merriam-Webster dictionary, the first known use in English was in 1990. It refers to disparaging information that can be collected, stored, traded, or used strategically across all domains: political, electoral, legal, professional, judicial, media, and business. The information may be truthful, fictional, or a mix of both, including presenting information out of context.

== Use in Soviet Union and Russia ==
Use of kompromat has been common in the politics of Russia and other post-Soviet states. Historically, kompromat techniques included altered photographs, planted drugs, grainy videos of liaisons with prostitutes hired by the KGB, and a wide range of other primitive entrapment techniques. More contemporary forms of kompromat appear as a form of cybercrime. A consistent aspect of kompromat is that the compromising information is often sexual in nature.

The use of kompromat is part of the political culture in Russia, with many members of the business and political elite collecting and storing potentially compromising material on their political opponents. A person or organization collecting kompromat may not target specific individuals, instead collecting a range of information that could be useful later. Compromising videos may be produced long in advance of when leverage over people is needed.

Especially when promoted or supported by public figures or news media, kompromat is a form of disinformation, creating confusion and reducing public trust in institutions. Opposition research is conducted in the U.S. to find compromising material on political opponents so that such material may be released to weaken those opponents. Some contend that kompromat differs from opposition research, in that such information is used to exert influence over people rather than simply to win elections. Nevertheless, compromising material uncovered by opposition research need not be used in only legal or ethical ways. It can be used to exert influence over Western leaders just as surely as it can be used to exert influence over Russian leaders.

== Notable cases ==
In the 1950s, British civil servant John Vassall was a victim of a gay honey trap operation, producing kompromat which was used to blackmail him, since homosexuality was illegal in Britain at the time. During a 1957 visit to Moscow, American journalist Joseph Alsop also fell victim to a gay honey trap operation conducted by the KGB. In 1997, Valentin Kovalyov was removed as the Russian Minister of Justice after photographs of him with prostitutes in a sauna controlled by the Solntsevskaya Bratva crime organization were published in a newspaper. In 1999, a video was broadcast showing a man resembling Yury Skuratov in bed with two women, which later led to his dismissal as Prosecutor General of Russia. It was released after he began looking into charges of corruption by President Boris Yeltsin and his associates.

In April 2010, politician Ilya Yashin, comedian Victor Shenderovich, and several other opposition figures (including Eduard Limonov and Alexander Belov) were involved in a sex scandal with a woman nicknamed "Katya Mumu", who was claimed to have acted as a Kremlin honey trap to discredit opposition figures. The video of Shenderovich was released only two days before the wedding of his daughter.

In cases of kompromat during the early 21st century, Russian operatives have been suspected or accused of placing child pornography on the personal computers of individuals they were attempting to discredit. In 2015, the UK's Crown Prosecution Service announced that it would prosecute Vladimir Bukovsky for "prohibited images" found on his computer. Bukovsky pleaded not guilty and claimed the images were planted as part of a smear campaign by Russian security services. Although a British expert testified that there was no evidence the images had been planted, the trial was indefinitely suspended in 2018 due to Bukovsky's severe ill health. Bukovsky died in October 2019.

Ahead of the 2016 Russian legislative election, a secretly recorded sex tape of opposition leader Mikhail Kasyanov and activist Natalya Pelevina was broadcast on the state-controlled television network NTV. During the 2016 U.S. presidential election, U.S. intelligence agencies investigated possibly compromising personal and financial information on President-elect Donald Trump, based on an opposition research report known as the Steele dossier, leading to allegations that he and members of his administration might be vulnerable to manipulation by the Russian government.

British Labour Party MP Chris Bryant, an ex-chair of the all-party parliamentary group for Russia who stated that the Russian government orchestrated a homophobic campaign to remove him from this position, has alleged that the Russian government acquired kompromat on high-profile Conservative Party MPs, including Boris Johnson, Liam Fox, Alan Duncan, and David Davis. These claims have not been substantiated by the publication of any such material.

Following a 2016 phone call between incoming U.S. National Security Adviser Michael Flynn and Russian ambassador Sergey Kislyak, Flynn allegedly lied to the White House on the extent of those contacts, placing him in a position vulnerable to blackmail. According to congressional testimony delivered by former Acting U.S. Attorney General Sally Yates, the Department of Justice believed that "General Flynn was compromised," and placed Flynn in "a situation where the national-security adviser essentially could be blackmailed by the Russians".

== Websites ==
In 1999, Sergey Gorshkov created Kompromat.ru, a blog about scandals involving Russian politicians. He posted some of the material proactively, including links to legitimate news stories, and accepted payments in exchange for posting other unverified material; the website was both controversial and recognized as an independent publication. Kompromat.ru was purchased by a private investor in 2009. In 2005, human rights activist Vladimir Pribylovsky created Anticompromat.org, an opposition politics website that compiled information about Russian politicians, including from news reports.

In the 2020s, anonymous fake news websites emerged that secretly take payments to publish negative information—often targeting political or business competitors in post-Soviet countries. These sites also demand blackmail payments from targets in exchange for removing the articles. Some of the URLs include keywords such as "kompromat", "ruscrime", and "antikor". The negative information may be true, false, or a mix of both. These websites may also publish brief factual articles based on news agency reports, and create fake journalist names or copy the names of real journalists, to make the website look legitimate. The websites use search engine optimization techniques to come up in web search results for a target's name.

== See also ==
- Active measures
- Character assassination
- Cyberwarfare
- Defamation
- False evidence
- Ibiza affair
- Jeffrey Epstein § Alleged connections to intelligence agencies
