= Nonino =

Italian distillery company

Nonino Grappa
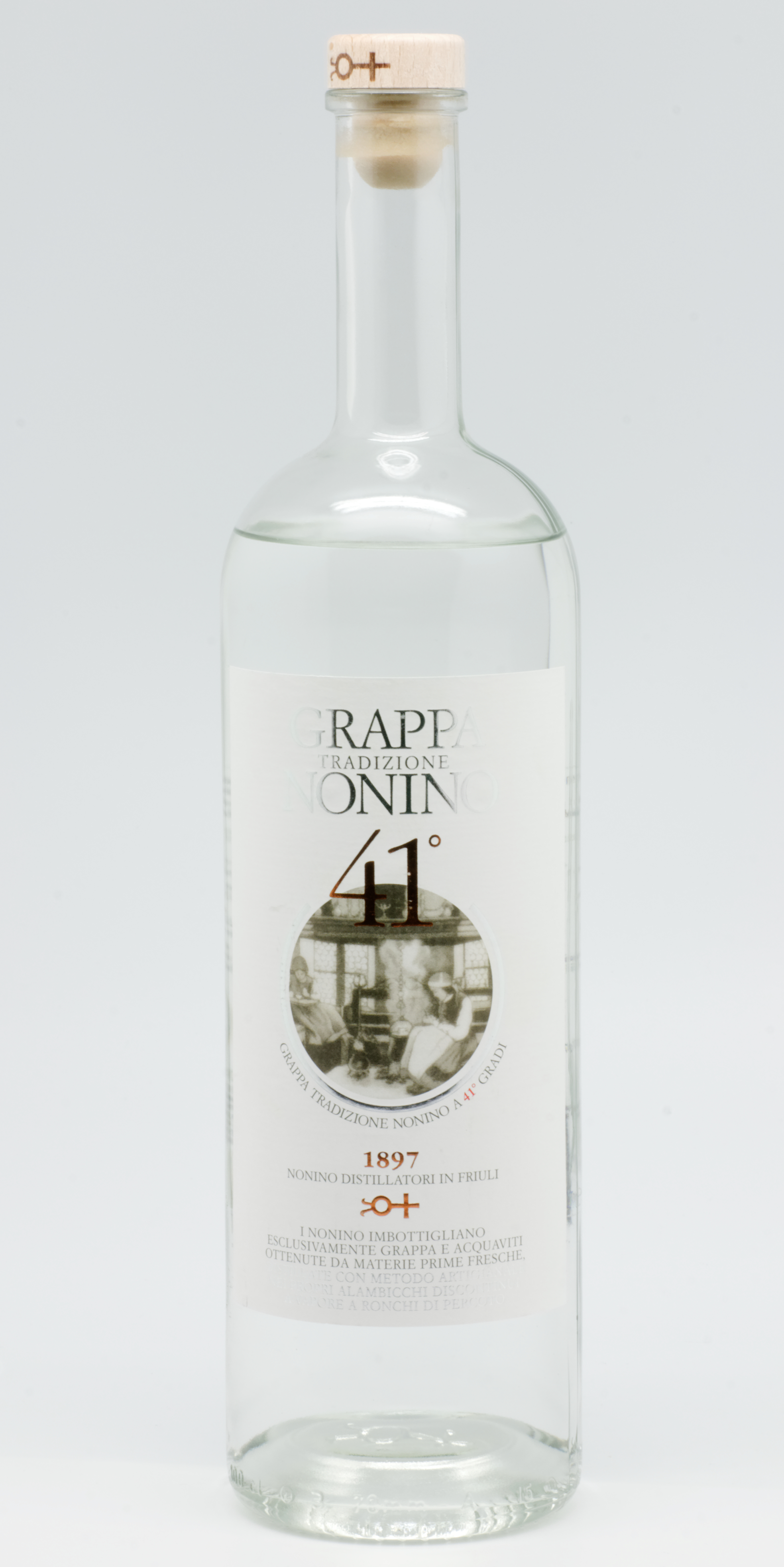
- Type: Grappa
- Manufacturer: Nonino
- Origin: Friuli, Italy
- Introduced: 19th century
- Proof (US): 80
- Website: www.grappanonino.it

Nonino is a small Italian company that is a producer of grappa and amaro. Nonino is also the name of the family that owns and runs the brand Nonino Grappa and Amaro Nonino. The first Nonino distillery was built by Orazio Nonino in Ronchi di Percoto, Pavia di Udine, in the Friuli region in northeastern Italy, in 1897.

The company is led by Gianola Nonino, wife of Benito Nonino—the great-grandson of Orazio Nonino (the fourth generation), who led the company to achievements and made its Nonino Grappa famous among the celebrities of Italy. Nonino has won several prizes, and innovated in the field of grappa production. In 1973, Nonino became the first company to produce a commercial grappa from a single grape variety by creating a liquor using only the Picolit grape. In 1984, the company produced the first whole-grape distillate, which they marketed as Ue.

Nonino founded the International Nonino Prize literary prize in 1975.

== Serving suggestions ==
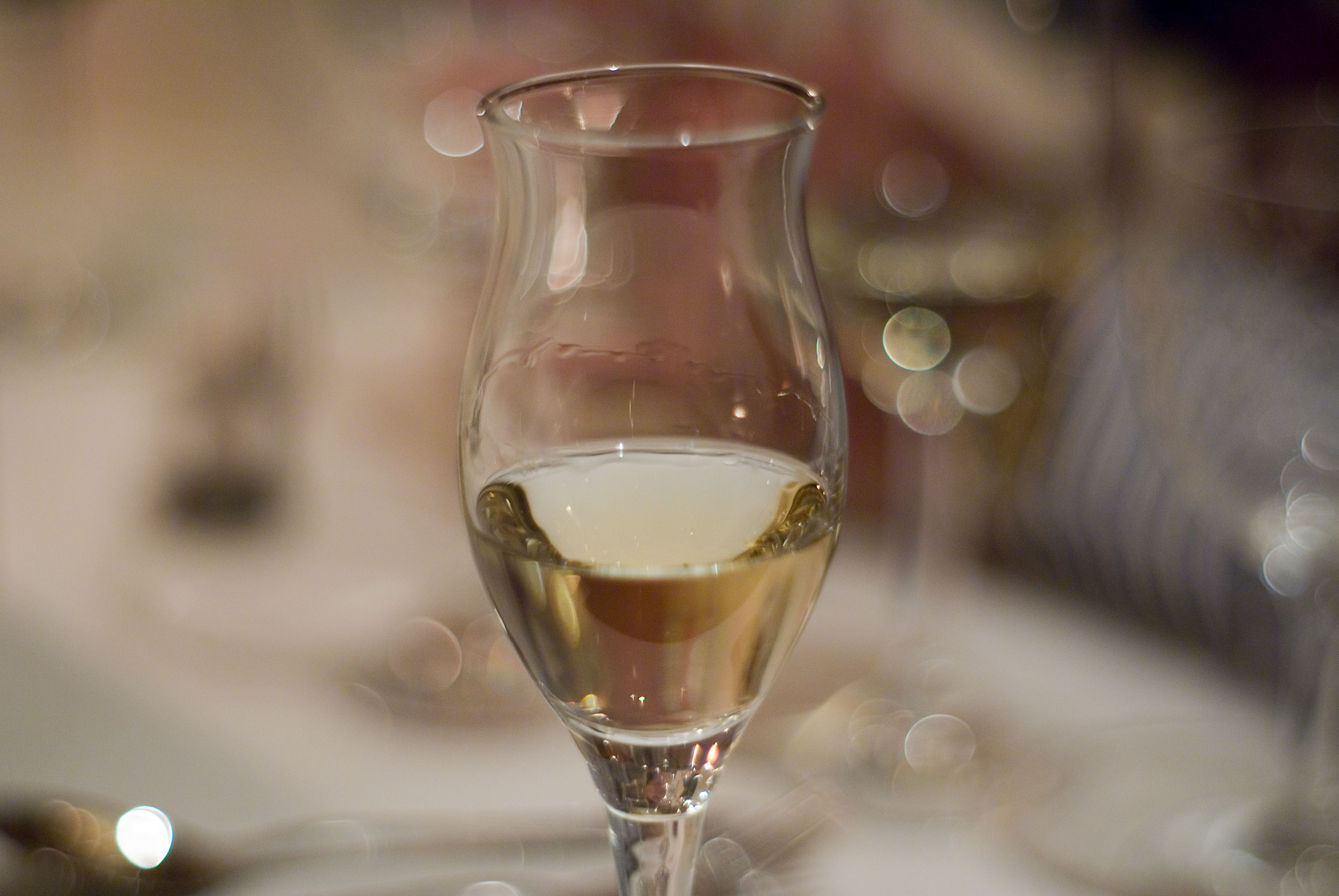
A glass of grappa.

Grappa bottles should be stored upright. Usually, Italian households serve grappa frozen, giving it an icy, crisp taste, while the Instituto Nazionale Grappa recommends serving young grappa at between 9 and 13 degrees Celsius, and riserva at around 17 degrees.

Grappa is typically served in Italy as a "digestive" (after-dinner drink), to aid in the digestion of heavy meals. It is often also used as a folk remedy in Italy for toothache, bronchitis, rheumatism, or indigestion.

== International Nonino Prize ==
Nonino founded the International Nonino Prize, originally designed to award and preserve Friulian traditions but which has developed into a prestigious literary prize. The prize was established in 1975.

=== Winners ===
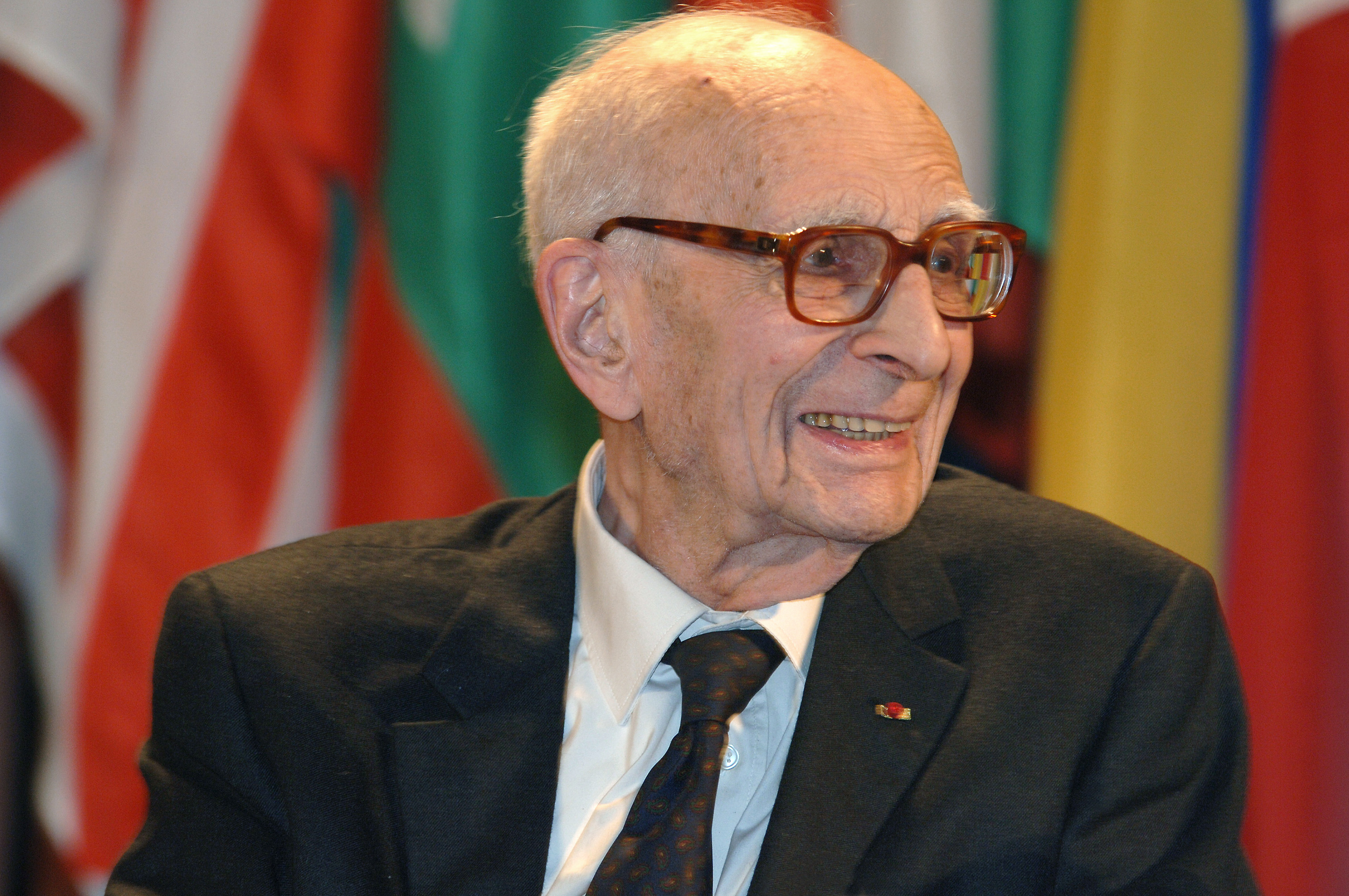
Claude Lévi-Strauss

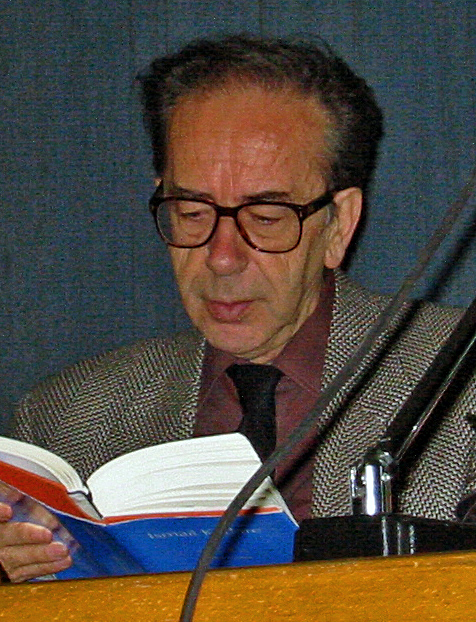
Ismail Kadare

- 1984: Jorge Amado (Brazil)
- 1985: Léopold Sédar Senghor (Senegal)
- 1986: Claude Lévi-Strauss (France)
- 1987: Henry Roth (United States)
- 1988: Aron Gurevich (Russia)
- 1989: Jacques Brosse (France)
- 1990: Érik Orsenna (France)
- 1991: Álvaro Mutis (Colombia)
- 1992: Ah Cheng (China)
- 1993: V.S. Naipaul (Trinidad)
- 1994: Chinua Achebe (Nigeria)
- 1995: Jaan Kross (Estonia)
- 1996: Edward Saïd (United States)
- 1997: Yaşar Kemal (Turkey)
- 1998: Amin Maalouf (Lebanon)
- 1999: Adunis (Syria)
- 2000: Hugo Claus (Belgium)
- 2001: Ngũgĩ wa Thiong'o (Kenya)
- 2002: Norman Manea (Romania)
- 2003: John Banville (Ireland)
- 2004: Tomas Tranströmer (Sweden)
- 2005: Mo Yan (China)
- 2006: Setouchi Harumi (Japan)
- 2007: Harry Mulisch (Netherlands)
- 2008: William Trevor (Ireland)
- 2009: Chimamanda Ngozi Adichie (Nigeria)
- 2010: Siegfried Lenz (Germany)
- 2011: Javier Marías (Spain)
- 2012: Yang Lian (China)
- 2013: Jorie Graham (United States)
- 2014: António Lobo Antunes (Portugal)
- 2015: Yves Bonnefoy (France)
- 2016: Lars Gustafsson (Sweden)
- 2017: Pierre Michon (France)
- 2018: Ismail Kadare (Albania)
- 2019: Juan Octavio Prenz (Argentina)
- 2020: not awarded
- 2021: not awarded
- 2022: David Almond (United Kingdom)
- 2024: Alberto Manguel (Argentina, Canada)
- 2025: Michael Krüger (Germany)
