= Norman Manea =

Romanian writer (born 1936)

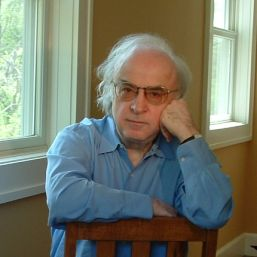
Norman Manea

Norman Manea (Romanian pronunciation: [ˈnorman ˈmane̯a]; born 19 July 1936) is a Romanian writer and author of short fiction, novels, and essays about the Holocaust, daily life in a communist state, and exile. He lives in the United States, where he is a Professor and writer in residence at Bard College.

He left Romania in 1986 with a DAAD-Berlin Grant and in 1988 went to the US with a Fulbright Scholarship at the Catholic University in Washington DC. He won the 2002 International Nonino Prize in Italy.

Manea's most acclaimed book, The Hooligan's Return (2003), is an original fictionalized memoir, encompassing a period of almost 80 years, from the pre-war period, through the Second World War, the communist and post-communist years to the present.

In an article in The Israel Jorunal of Foreign Affairs Swiss historian Simon Geissbühler, a leading authority on the Holocaust in Romania wrote:

“Manea’s literary strategy is one of irony, ambiguity, and coded critique—a form of intellectual resistance designed to evade the surveillance of the regime while preserving the autonomy of the individual voice. His literary representation of the Holocaust is also more structured and distanced than poetic, both in substance and in language. This is both a function of style—some of Manea's most penetrating works are his essays and his autobiography—and of the fact that the writer was so young when he was deported that the experience itself was too fragmentary to be the main source of his literary work. This distance is not emotional indifference, but rather a product of belatedness and fragmentary memory.”

Manea has been known and praised as an internationally important writer since the early 1990s, and his works have been translated into more than 20 languages. He has received more than 20 awards and honours.

== Early years ==
Born to Jewish parents in the Burdujeni neighbourhood of Suceava (Bukovina, Romania), Manea was deported as a child, in 1941, by the Romanian fascist authorities, allied with Nazi Germany, to a concentration camp in Transnistria, together with his family. He returned to Romania in 1945 with the surviving members of his family and graduated with high honours from the high school (liceu) Ștefan cel Mare in his home town, Suceava. He studied engineering at the Construction Institute in Bucharest and graduated with a master's degree in hydro-technique in 1959, working afterwards in planning, fieldwork and research. He has devoted himself to writing since 1974.

== Literary career ==
In 1966, his literary debut took place in Povestea Vorbii (The Story of Speech), an avant-garde and influential magazine that appeared in the early years of cultural liberalization in communist Romania and was suppressed after six issues. Until he was forced into exile (1986) he published ten volumes of short fiction essays and novels. His work was an irritant to the authorities because of the implied and overt social-political criticism and he faced a lot of trouble with the censors and the official press. At the same time that sustained efforts were made by the cultural authorities to suppress his work, it had the support and praise of the country's most important literary critics.

After the Ceaușescu dictatorship collapsed, several of his books started to be published in Romania. The publication in a Romanian translation of his essay Happy Guilt, which first appeared in The New Republic, led to a nationalist outcry in Romania, which he in turn has analysed in depth in his essay "Blasphemy and Carnival". Echoes of this scandal can still be found in some articles in the current Romanian cultural press.

Meantime, in the United States and European countries, Manea's writing was received with great acclaim. Over the past two decades, he has been proposed as a candidate for the Nobel Prize for Literature by literary and academic personalities and institutions in the United States, Sweden, Romania, Italy and France. Important contemporary writers expressed admiration of the author's literary work and his moral stand before and after the collapse of communism: the Nobel laureates Heinrich Böll, Günter Grass, Octavio Paz, Orhan Pamuk, as well as Philip Roth, Claudio Magris, Antonio Tabucchi, E. M. Cioran, Antonio Muñoz Molina, Cynthia Ozick, Louis Begley and others.

== Honors ==
- 1979 – Literary Prize of the Bucharest Writers' Association (Romania)
- 1984 – Literary Prize of the Romanian Writer's Union (withdrawn by the Communist authorities)
- 1987 – DAAD Berliner Künstler Programm Grant (Germany)
- 1988 – Fulbright Scholarship, Catholic University, Washington, DC (USA)
- 1989–1992 – International Academy for Scholarship and the Arts Fellowship, Bard College (USA)
- 1992 – Guggenheim Fellowship (USA)
- 1992 – MacArthur Fellows Award (USA)
- 1993 – The National Jewish Book Award (USA)
- 1996 – The Marie Syrkin Jerusalem Fellowship in Letters (Israel)
- 1997 – The Bukovina Literary Prize (Romania)
- 2002 – The International Nonino Prize (Italy)
- 2004, 2005 – American Academy Fellowship in Berlin (Germany)
- 2004 – The Napoli Literary Prize for foreign novel (Italy)
- 2005 – Holtzbrinck Prize of the American Academy in Berlin (Germany)
- 2005 – Best foreign book in Spain (El Regreso del Huligan / The Hooligan's Return)
- 2006 – Lux Mundi, the Cultural Award of Radio Romania Cultural (Romania)
- 2006 – Elected jury member of the International Nonino Prize (Italy)
- 2006 – Finalist, Prix Femina (France)
- 2006 – Prix Médicis Étranger (France)
- 2006 – The Cultural Prize of Romanian International Television (Romania)
- 2006 – Elected member of the Berlin Academy of Art (Germany)
- 2007 – Finalist, Latinity Prize of the Association of Latin Countries
- 2007 – Awarded the Order of Cultural Merit (in rank of Commander) by the President of Romania (Romania)
- 2008 – Honorary degree in literature, University of Bucharest (Romania)
- 2008 – Honorary degree in literature, Babeș-Bolyai University (Romania)
- 2009 – The Literary Award of the Fondation du Judaisme Français (France)
- 2009 – Finalist, Literary Prize of Fundación Príncipe de Asturias (Spain)
- 2009 – The Observator Cultural Lifetime Award Opera Omnia (Romania)
- 2009 – Commandant dans l'Ordre des Arts et des Lettres(France)
- 2011 – Nelly Sachs Prize (Germany)
- 2012 – Fellow of the Royal Society of Literature
- 2012 – Honorary Degree in Literature, Al.I.Cuza University of Iassy (Romania)
- 2012 – Fellow of the Institute for Humanities (New York University)
- 2012 – The National Prize for Literature (Romanian Writers Union)
- 2012 – The Palau i Fabre Prize for Essay (Spain)
- 2016 – Awarded the Star of Romania distinction by the Romanian President
- 2016 – The FIL International Prize for Romance Languages and Literature
- 2016 – Carlos Fuentes Medal
- 2017 – Honored as Professor Emeritus and Distinguished Writer in Residence and with the Bardian Award
- 2018 – Diploma of Excellence, Romanian-American Chamber of Commerce
- 2018 – Bucovina Merit Distinction, Suceava County Council, Suceava (Romania)
- 2018 – ALIANTA - Arts and Letters Award, Suceava (Romania)

== Works (Romanian) ==
- 1969 Noaptea pe latura lungă (Night on the Long Side) (short fiction), Editura pentru literatură
- 1970 Captivi (Captives) (novel), Editura Cartea Românească; 2011 – second edition, Polirom
- 1974 Primele porți (First Gates) (short fiction), Albatros
- 1977 Cartea fiului (Book of the Son) (novel); 2011 – second edition, Polirom
- 1979 Anii de ucenicie ai lui August Prostul (The Apprenticeship Years of Augustus the Fool) (documentary novel); 2012 – second edition, Polirom
- 1981 Octombrie, ora opt (October, eight o'clock) (short fiction); 1997 – second edition, Apostrof
- 1984 Pe contur (On the Edge) (essays)
- 1986 Plicul negru (The Black Envelope) (novel); 1996 – second edition, Editura Cartea Românească; 2003, 2006 – Polirom
- 1997 Despre clovni: Dictatorul și artistul (On Clowns: The Dictator and the Artist) (essays); 2005, 2006, 2013 – Polirom
- 1999 Fericirea obligatorie (Compulsory Happiness) (novellas), Apostrof; 2005, 2011 – Polirom
- 1999 Casa melcului (The Snail's House) (interviews), Hasefer
- 2003 Intoarcerea huliganului (The Hooligan's Return) (novelistic memoir), Polirom; 2006, 2011 – Polirom
- 2004 Plicuri și portrete (Envelopes and Portraits) (essays), Polirom
- 2006 Textul nomad (The Nomad Text) (interviews), Hasefer
- 2008 Vorbind pietrei (Talking to a Stone), Polirom
- 2008 Înaintea despărțirii (Before Parting) (conversation with Saul Bellow), Polirom
- 2009 Vizuina (The Lair) (novel), Polirom; 2010 – Polirom
- 2010 Laptele negru (The black milk) (essays and interviews), Hasefer
- 2010 Curierul de Est. Dialog cu Edward Kanterian, Polirom
- 2011 Cuvinte din exil. Dialog cu Hanes Stein, Polirom
