= Vyacheslav Ivanov (philologist) =

Russian philologist (1929–2017)

- Вячеслав Иванов
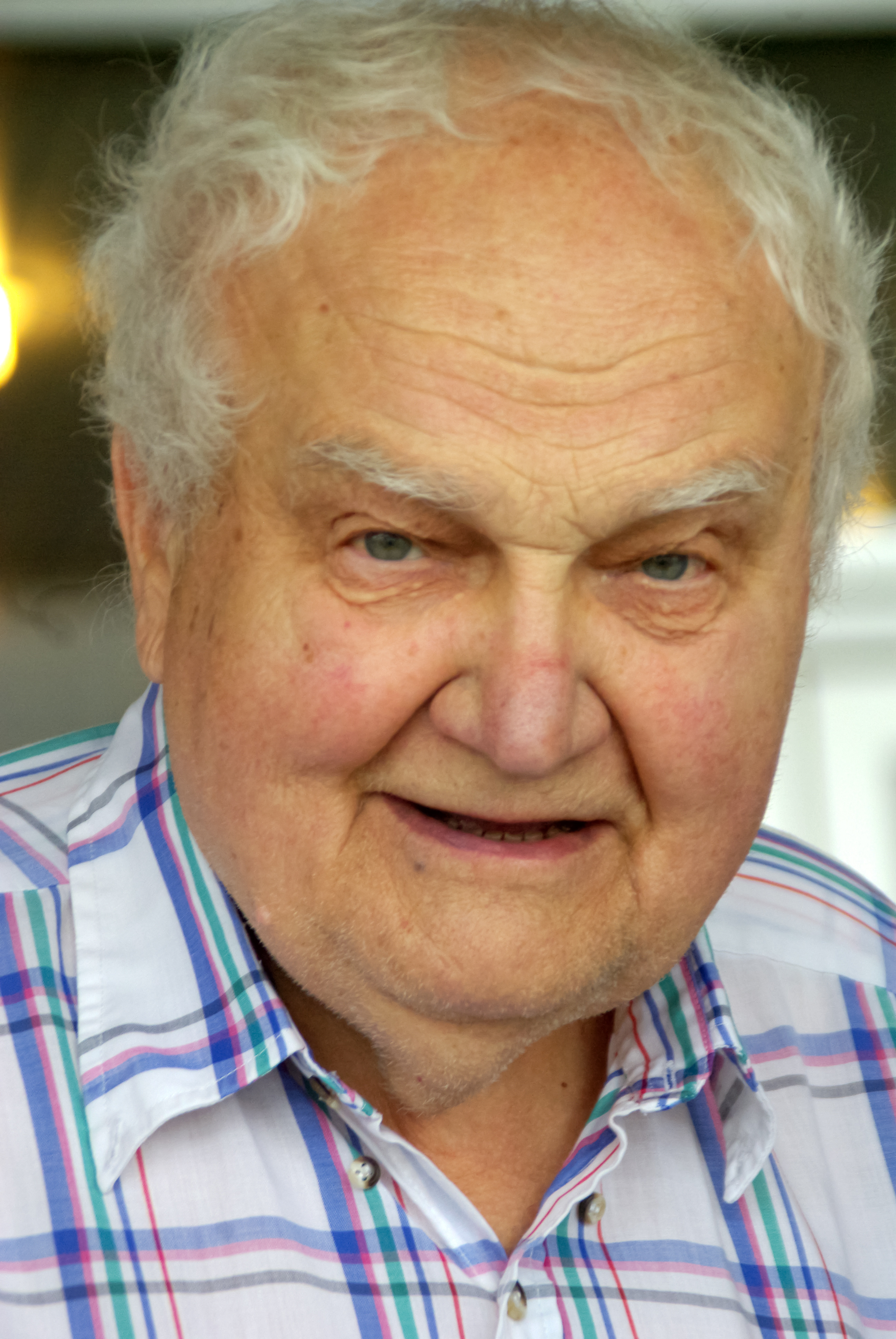
- Ivanov at the 6 Moscow International Book Festival, 2011
- Born: Vyacheslav Vsevolodovich Ivanov; 21 August 1929; Moscow, Russian SFSR, Soviet Union
- Died: 7 October 2017 (aged 88); Los Angeles, California, United States
- Citizenship: Soviet Union, Russia
- Education: Moscow State University
- Occupations: Philologist; semiotician; linguist
- Awards: Lenin Prize; USSR State Prize
- Scientific career
- Fields: Philology; semiotics; linguistics
- Workplaces: Moscow State University; Russian State University for the Humanities; University of California, Los Angeles; Stanford University; Yale University

Vyacheslav Vsevolodovich Ivanov (Russian: Вячесла́в Все́володович Ива́нов [vʲɪtɕɪˈslaf ˈfsʲevələdəvʲɪtɕ ɪˈvanəf]; 21 August 1929 – 7 October 2017) was a prominent Soviet and Russian philologist, semiotician and Indo-Europeanist probably best known for his glottalic theory of Indo-European consonantism and for placing the Indo-European urheimat in the area of the Armenian highlands and Lake Urmia.

== Early life ==
Vyacheslav Ivanov's father was Vsevolod Ivanov, a prominent Soviet writer. His mother was an actress who worked in the theatre of Vsevolod Meyerhold. His childhood was clouded by disease and war, especially in Tashkent.

Ivanov was educated at Moscow University and worked there until 1958, when he was fired on account of his sympathy with Boris Pasternak and Roman Jakobson. By that time, he had made some important contributions to Indo-European studies and became one of the leading authorities on the Hittite language.

== Career ==
- 1959–1961 — head of the Research Group for Machine Translation at the Institute of Computer Technology of the Academy of Sciences of the USSR, Moscow
- 1963–1989 — head of the Structural Typology Sector of the Institute of Slavic Studies of the Academy of Sciences of the USSR, Moscow
- 1989–1993 — director of the All-Union Library of Foreign Literature in Moscow (VGBIL)
- 1989–1995 — chair of the Department of Theory and History of World Culture of the Philosophical Faculty of Moscow State University
- 1992–2017 — founding director of Moscow State University's Institute of World Culture
- 2003–2017 — founding director of the Russian Anthropological School at the Russian State University for the Humanities in Moscow
- from November 1991 — professor in the Department of Slavic Languages and Literatures and the Program of Indo-European Studies at University of California, Los Angeles; retired in 2015, distinguished research professor since then

The member of the academies of sciences and learned societies:

- the Russian Academy of Sciences
- the American Academy of Arts and Sciences
- the British Academy
- the Croatian Academy of Sciences and Arts
- the Latvian Academy of Sciences
- the Linguistic Society of America
- the American Philosophical Society

He was elected a full member of the Russian Academy of Sciences in 2000, and he has been a Foreign Fellow of the British Academy since 1977.

Also, in 1989 he was elected to the Supreme Soviet of Russia, but left for the United States soon thereafter.

== Scholarly contribution ==
During the early 1960s, Ivanov was one of the first Soviet scholars to take a keen interest in the development of semiotics. He worked with Vladimir Toporov on several linguistic monographs, including an outline of Sanskrit. In 1962 he joined Toporov and Juri Lotman in establishing the Tartu-Moscow Semiotic School. During the 1970s Ivanov worked with Tamaz Gamkrelidze on a new theory about the Indo-European phonetic system: the famous glottalic theory. These two academics worked together also on a new theory of Indo-European migrations, during the 1980s, which was most recently advocated by them in Indo-European and Indo-Europeans (1995).

== Other interests ==
In 1965 Ivanov edited, wrote extensive scholarly comments, and published the first Russian edition of previously unpublished "Psychology of Art" by Lev Vygotsky (the work written in the first half of the 1920s). The second, extended and corrected edition of the book came out in 1968 and included another Vygotsky's unpublished work, his treatise on Shakespeare's Hamlet (written in 1915-1916). The first edition of the book was subsequently translated into English by Scripta Technica Inc. and released by MIT Press in 1971.

== Selected publications ==
- Sanskrit. Moscow: Nauka Pub. House, Central Dept. of Oriental Literature, 1968.
- Borozdy i mezhi. Letchworth: Bradda Books, 1971. 351 p.
- with Tamaz V. Gamkrelidze, Indoevropjskij jazyk i indoevropejcy: Rekonstrukcija i istoriko-tipologieskij analiz prajazyka i protokultury. Tiflis: Tiflis University Press 1984. xcvi + 1328 p.
  - English translation: Indo-European and the Indo-Europeans: A reconstruction and historical analysis of a proto-language and a proto-culture. 2 vols. Trans. J. Nichols. Berlin–New York: Mouton de Gruyter, 1: 1994, 2: 1995
- with T. V. Gamkrelidze, “The ancient Near East and the Indo-European question: Temporal and territorial characteristics of Proto-Indo-European based on linguistic and historico-cultural data”, Journal of Indo-European Studies vol. 13, no. 1–2 (1985): 3–48.
- with T. V. Gamkrelidze, “The migrations of tribes speaking Indo-European dialects from their original homeland in the Near East to their historical habitations in Eurasia”, Journal of Indo-European Studies vol. 13, no. 1–2 (1985): 9–91.
- Vyacheslav V. Ivanov and Thomas Gamkrelidze, “The Early History of Indo-European Languages”, Scientific American vol. 262, no. 3 (March, 1990): 110-116.
- The archives of the Russian Orthodox Church of Alaska, Aleutian and Kuril Islands (1794—1912): An attempt at a multisemiotic society. Washington, 1996.
- The Russian orthodox church of Alaska and the Aleutian Islands and its relation to native American traditions — an attempt at a multicultural society, 1794—1912. Washington, D.C.: Library of Congress; U.S. G.P.O., 1997.
- (as editor) with Ilia Verkholantseva, eds., Speculum Slaviae Orientalis : Muscovy, Ruthenia and Lithuania in the late Middle Ages. Moscow: Novoe izdatel'stvo, 2005.
- (as editor), Issledovaniia po tipologii slavianskikh, baltiĭskikh i balkanskikh iazykov: preimushchestvenno v svete iazykovykh kontaktov [= Studies in the typology of Slavic, Baltic and Balkan languages: with primary reference to language contact]. St. Petersburg: Aleteĭia, 2013.
- with V. N. Toporov, Mifologiia: statʹi dlia mifologicheskikh ėntsiklopediĭ. Moscow: IASK, Iazyki slavianskikh kulʹtur, 2014.
- Cultural-historical theory and semiotics. In A. Yasnitsky, R. Van der Veer & M. Ferrari (Eds.), The Cambridge handbook of cultural-historical psychology (488-516). Cambridge: Cambridge University Press, 2014.

== See also ==
- Culturology
- Alexander Dobrokhotov
- Aron Gurevich
- Mikhail Gasparov
