= Roman Dobrokhotov =

Russian investigative journalist

- Роман Александрович Доброхотов
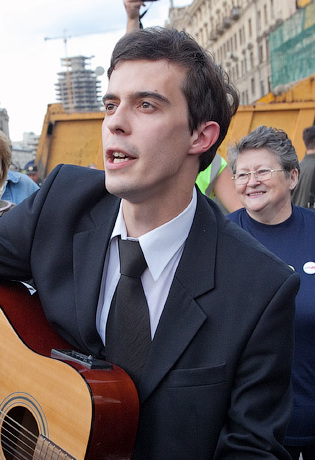
- Dobrokhotov during a protest in defence of Article 31 of the Constitution of the Russian Federation in Moscow
- Born: August 6, 1983; Moscow (Soviet Union)
- Education: Russian and Ukrainian PhD in Political Science
- Alma mater: Moscow State Institute of International Relations; Higher School of Economics
- Occupation: Investigative journalist, political scientist
- Employer: The Insider (2013–)
- Political party: 5th of December Party
- Parent(s): Alexander Dobrokhotov
- Awards: Journalism as a Profession (Unmasking the Salisbury Poisoning Suspects: A Four-Part Investigation, 2018); European Press Prize Investigative Reporting Award (Unmasking the Salisbury Poisoning Suspects: A Four-Part Investigation, 2019); Redkollegia (Countersanctions. How FSB officers tried to poison Vladimir Kara-Murza, 2021); Redkollegia (2025)
- Position held: editor-in-chief (2013–)

Roman Alexandrovich Dobrokhotov (Russian: Роман Александрович Доброхотов; born August 6, 1983) is a Russian investigative journalist, political scientist and former activist. He is the founder and editor-in-chief of The Insider, a Russia-focused media outlet. He is also one of the founders and leaders of the 5th of December Party, a member of the federal political council of the Solidarnost movement and member of the political council of the Solidarnost's Moscow branch.

== Early life and education ==
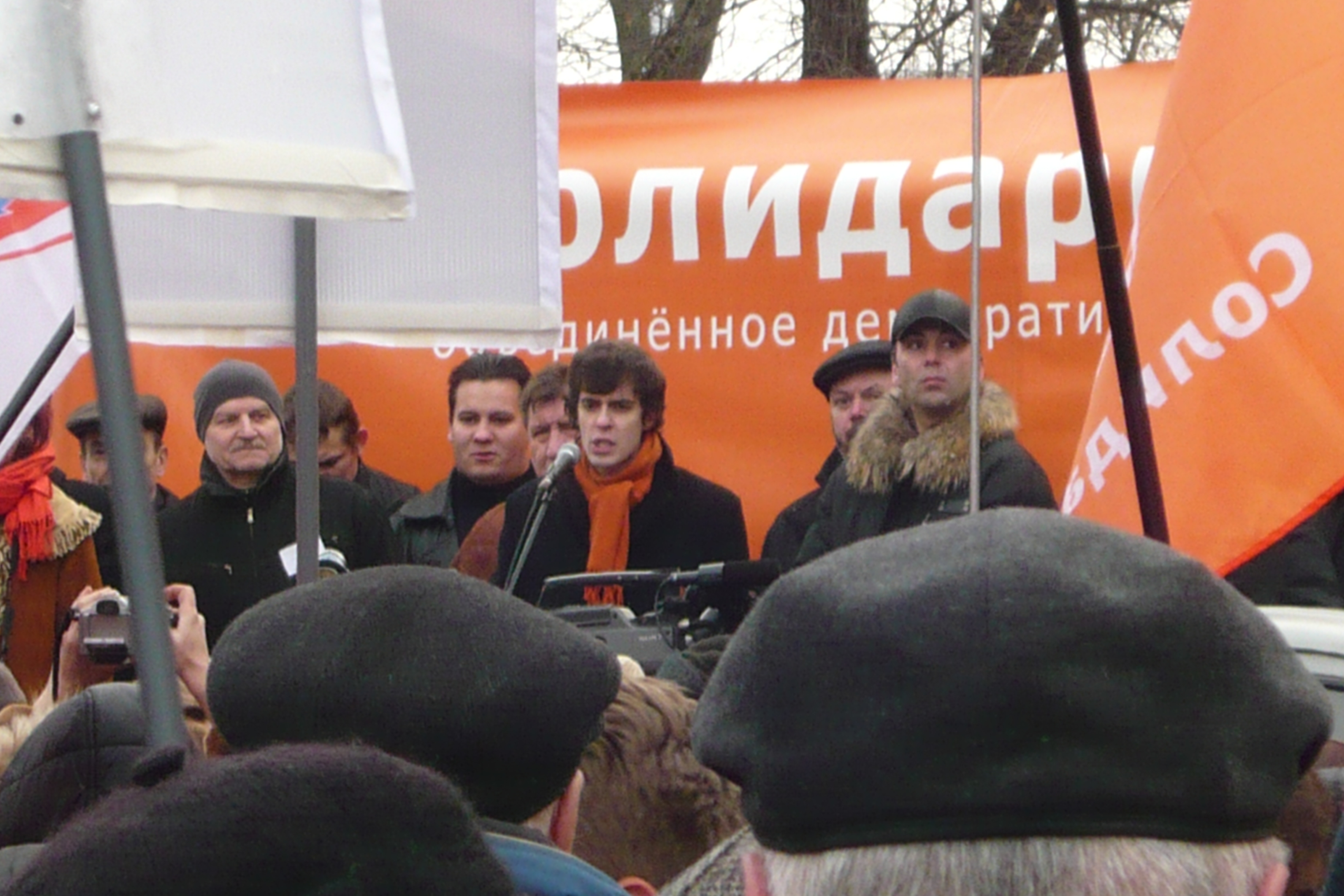
Roman Dobrokhotov at the first demonstration of the Solidarnost movement in 2009

Roman Dobrokhotov studied at School No. 1525 in Moscow. His father is the Russian philosopher Alexander Dobrokhotov. From 2000 to 2006, he studied at Moscow State Institute of International Relations (MGIMO) at the Faculty of Political Science. In 2006—2007, in graduate school at the Higher School of Economics in Moscow. The topic of Dobrokhotov's PhD thesis was "Trust in world politics".

== Career ==
Since 2005, he has been leader of the movement "We", a member of the federal political council of the movement Solidarnost since the foundation of the movement in 2008, and a member of the political council of the Moscow branch of Solidarnost since 2009. From 2006 to 2008, he was a columnist and deputy editor of the department of economics of the Novye Izvestia newspaper.

From 2006 to 2008, he worked as a freelance employee of the radio station Govorit Moskva, where he hosted the weekly program Очная ставка, meaning "Confrontation".

In July 2009, Dobrokhotov announced his intention to run in elections to the Moscow City Duma in a single-mandate constituency number 5. His nomination was supported by the Solidarnost movement. The Moscow City Electoral Commission refused to register him, motivating the refusal with claims to the quality of the collected signatures.

In January 2010, he began working as a researcher at the State Academic University for the Humanities (GAUGN), where he taught political science.

In March 2010, Dobrokhotov signed the online manifesto of the Russian opposition "Putin Must Go".

=== Slon.ru ===
He joined the Russian online newspaper Slon.ru in April 2010 and worked there as an editor and correspondent.

On May 26, 2011, in response to the "Appeal to the country's leadership with a request to change the cultural policy of Russia", he organized a collection of signatures on his blog under the "Open letter to cultural figures".

On June 7, 2011, a political debate between the Nashi and Solidarnost movements took place at the ArteFAQ club in Moscow. Maria Kislitsyna and Gleb Krainik spoke on behalf of Nashi, Roman Dobrokhotov, Kostantin Yankauskas and Anastasia Rybachenko on behalf of Solidarnost. In June 2011, he took part in the forum of civil activists "Antiseliger". In 2012, he accepted an offer to participate in the Seliger (forum) and gave a lecture there on corruption in the Kremlin, in which he spoke about businessman Yury Kovalchuk, his son Boris Kovalchuk, Gennady Timchenko, and "Mikhail Ivanovich" (Vladimir Putin's pseudonym).

Dobrokhotov became one of the founders of the "Party of December 5" in the summer of 2012. He was nominated together with Sergei Davidis, Anna Karetnikova, Pyotr Tsarkov, Maria Baronova and eight other candidates from the "Party of December 5" in the elections to the Russian Opposition Coordination Council, which took place in October 2012.

In January 2013, Dobrokhotov became the author of the Come-Out Week project dedicated to the problems of the LGBT community. In 2013, he resigned from Slon.ru along with part of the editorial board. Andrei Goryanov, then editor-in-chief of Slon.ru, commenting on Dobrokhotov's dismissal, said: "It was impossible to work with him further. He does not see himself as a journalist, but rather a politician."

=== The Insider ===
On 30 September 2021, the Federal Security Service (FSB) raided Dobrokhotov's home, where his wife lived, and his parents’ apartment in Moscow after he allegedly crossed the border illegally and has been placed on a wanted list.

=== Incident with President Medvedev ===
On December 12, 2008, Dobrokhotov attracted media attention by interrupting a speech by then Russian President Dmitry Medvedev, when Medvedev proposed constitutional amendments extending the presidential term. He shouted: "The amendments are a disgrace”, adding that "there are no real elections." Federal Guard Service escorted Dobrokhotov away and tried to shut his mouth. The incident was cut from the broadcast of Medvedev's speech on federal TV channels, but was shown on the air of the St. Petersburg Channel Five. On the same day, Dobrokhotov was fired from his job at the radio Govorit Moskva.

=== Participation in opposition rallies ===
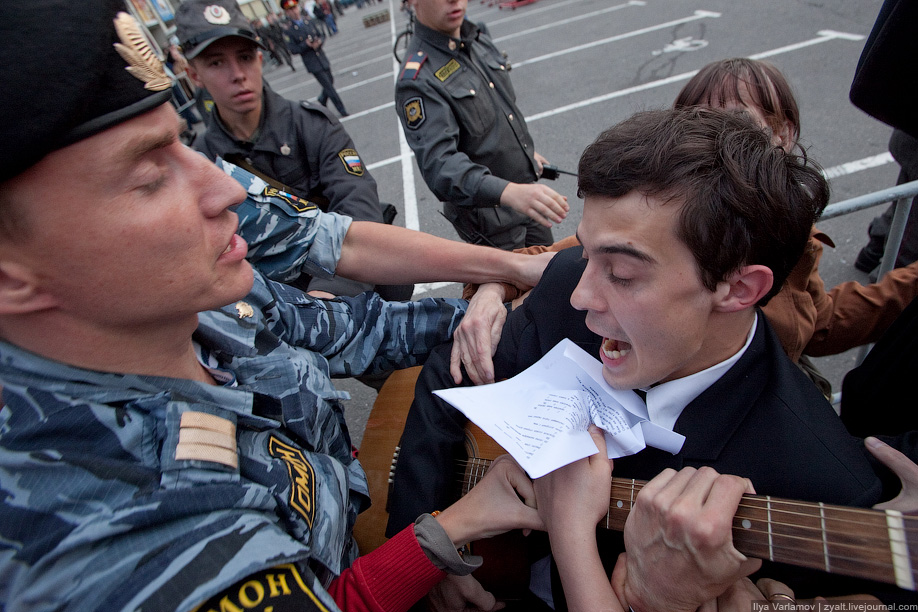
Protest action in defense of Article 31 (Freedom of assembly) of the Russian Constitution. Moscow, August 31, 2009.

On January 31, 2010, Dobrokhotov was detained at the rally Strategy-31 in support of Article 31 of the Constitution, which guarantees freedom of assembly. On September 28, 2010, he was detained at a rally against the former mayor of Moscow Yury Luzhkov.

On December 4, 2011, he was detained at Triumfalnaya Square in Moscow. He spoke from the stage of the rally "For Fair Elections" on Chistye Prudy in Moscow on December 5, 2011. Dobrokhotov was inspired by the 1989 Baltic Way campaign and organized a bright flash mob Big White Ring. The action took place on February 26, 2012.

On the birthday of Putin on October 7, 2012, he came with a rake to the rally "Let's take grandfather to retire" in Moscow; he was detained by the police. A year earlier, he was detained at an action by the pro-government movement Nashi, dedicated to another birthday of Putin.

On May 6, 2013, during the rally "Freedom to Prisoners on May 6" on Bolotnaya Square in Moscow, Orthodox activists attacked Dobrokhotov.

== Awards ==
- 2018 Journalism as a Profession award in the Investigative journalism category.
- 2019 European Press Prize Investigative Reporting Award with ‘Unmasking the Salisbury Poisoning Suspects: A Four-Part Investigation‘.
- 2021 Redkollegia award for an article "Counter-sanctions. How FSB officers tried to poison Vladimir Kara-Murza" (Russian: Контрсанкции. Как сотрудники ФСБ пытались отравить Владимира Кара-Мурзу).
