= 5th of December Party =

5th of December Party Партия 5 декабря
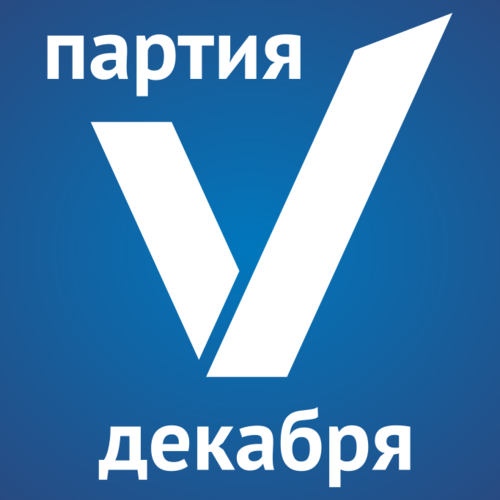
- Leader: Federal Coordination Council
- Founders: Roman Dobrokhotov; Konstantin Yankauskas; Denis Bilunov; Sergey Davidis; Natalia Pelevine
- Founded: 8 December 2011; 14 years ago
- Headquarters: Moscow
- Membership (2015): 2,000
- Ideology: Liberalism; Pro-Europeanism
- Political position: Centre to centre-right
- National affiliation: Opposition Coordination Council (2012–2013)
- Colours: Blue; White
- Seats in the State Duma: 0 / 450
- Seats in the Regional Parliaments: 0 / 3,994

Party flag
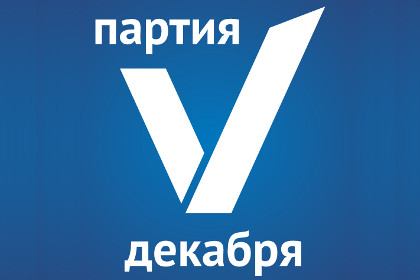

Website
- http://5dec.ru/

The 5th of December Party (Russian: Партия 5 декабря, romanized: Partiya pyatogo dekabrya) is a Russian liberal unregistered political party, managed by the Federal Coordinating Council (FCC). Among the co-founders of the party are Roman Dobrokhotov, Konstantin Yankauskas, Denis Bilunov, Sergey Davidis, Natalia Pelevine (later left the party) and others.

The party participated in the elections to the Opposition Coordination Council in October 2012. According to their results, the council included three members of the party: Sergey Davidis, Pyotr Tsarkov and Anna Karetnikova.

== History ==
The name of the party is associated with the day the protests began on Bolotnaya Square, with disagreement with the official results of the Parliamentary elections to the State Duma of the 6th convocation, which took place on December 4, 2011. The next day, December 5, were protests against the United Russia took place. In addition, December 5 is the date of the first Glasnost meeting in post-war Soviet Russia.

On December 8, 2011, the Constituent Congress of the All-Russian political party "5th of December Party" was held in Moscow, at which the highest governing body of the party, instead of a single leader, established the "Federal Coordination Council" (FCC).

On June 7, 2013, "5th of December Party" submitted documents for registration to the Ministry of Justice. On June 27, the Ministry of Justice suspended the registration of the party pending the elimination of the comments made.

On August 24, 2013, the 2nd party congress was held, at which the necessary amendments to the documents were adopted in order to re-submit documents to the Ministry of Justice for registration. Earlier in the party program there was a demand to disband the Federal Security Service, which, according to the employees of the Ministry of Justice, contradicts the Constitution of Russia.

On October 22, 2013, the Ministry of Justice of the Russian Federation again refused to register the 5th of December Party as a political party.

At the beginning of 2014, the party continues to be on the list of political parties that were denied state registration.

In the 2013 Moscow mayoral election, the party organized support for the candidate from the RPR-PARNAS party, Alexei Navalny.

In November 2013, the party issued a statement of support for Euromaidan in Ukraine.

On April 6, 2014, a new constituent congress of the "5th of December Party" was held in Moscow.

On October 27, 2014, the Ministry of Justice again refused to register the party.

On December 5, 2015, the IV Party Congress was held in Moscow on December 5. Congress participants discussed the work of the party in 2014-15, adopted a party development strategy for 2016-17, a new version of the party program and elected a new composition of the Federal Coordination Council of the party, consisting of 21 people. A political statement was adopted at the end of the congress.

== Opinions ==
The 5th of December Party has added to the list of unconditionally real political organizations, which the Ministry of Justice does not register as parties precisely because they are real political organizations. This list, at least, should include the People's Alliance and the National Democratic Party. They all have an asset, supporters, voters. All of them can successfully participate in elections. ... In the elections of the mayor of Moscow, the 5th of December Party supported me and completely autonomously organized campaigning events at a level superior to the "systemic parties". They always have people for pickets, and money can be collected, and lawyers, and organizers, and local deputies, and technologists. This is a real party. — Alexei Navalny
