= Nikolay Dobrokhotov =

Soviet scientists and metallurgist

Nikolay Nikolaevich Dobrokhotov
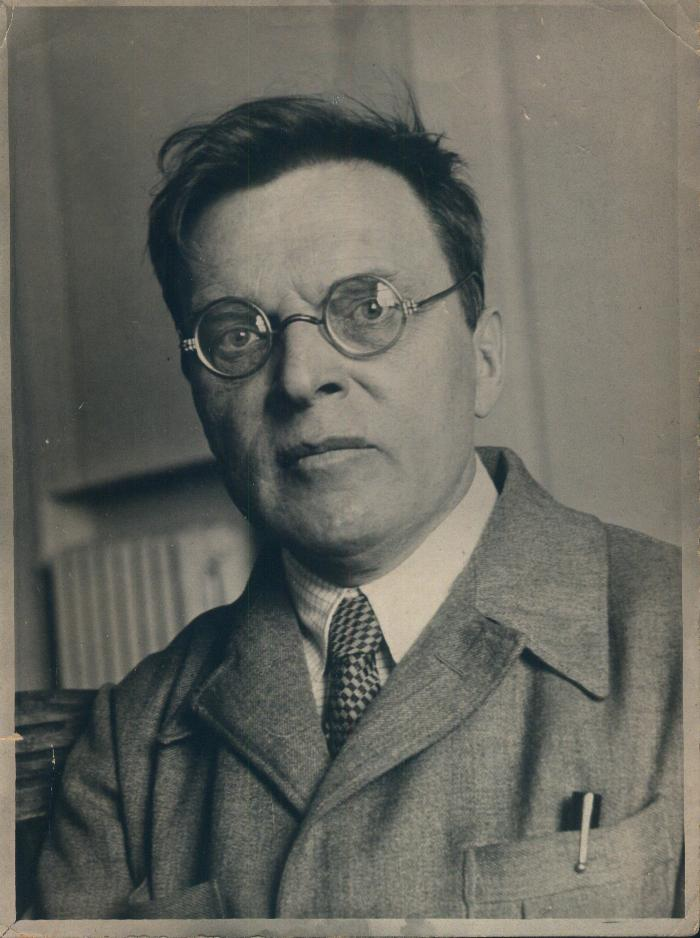
- Born: March 27, 1889; Arzamas, Russian Empire
- Died: October 15, 1963 (aged 74); Kiev, USSR
- Education: Saint Petersburg Mining Institute
- Awards: Order of Lenin (1954); Order of the Red Banner of Labour (1939); Order of the Red Banner of Labour (1958); Medal for Valiant Labor in the Great Patriotic War of 1941-1945
- Scientific career
- Fields: Metallurgy
- Workplaces: Saint Petersburg Mining Institute; Ural Polytechnic Institute; Dnipropetrovsk Metallurgical Institute; Kiev Polytechnic Institute; The Gas Institute in Kiev

Signature
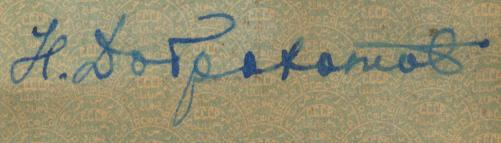

Nikolay Nikolayevich Dobrokhotov (Russian: Никола́й Никола́евич Доброхо́тов; 27 March [O.S. 14 March] 1889 – 15 October 1963) was a Soviet scientist and metallurgist, Honored Worker of Science and Technology of the Ukrainian SSR, Academician of the Ukrainian SSR Academy of Sciences.

== Biography ==
Nikolay Dobrokhotov was born on March 27, 1889, in Arzamas in Nizhny Novgorod Guberniya in the Russian Empire. His father Nikolay Nikanorovich Dobrokhotov was a telegraphist. His mother — Maria Fedorovna Vladimirskaya, graduate of Smolny Institute — was from the Vladimirskie family, many of whose members were engaged in social activities (maternal uncle — Mikhail Fyodorovich Vladimirsky — one of the oldest figures of the communist party, companion in arms of Vladimir Lenin), were friends of Maxim Gorky. Nikolay Dobrokhotov was the eldest son in a family of 12 children. There was no secondary school in Arzamas at that time and Dobrokhotov was sent to Nizhny Novgorod, where in 1900 he entered the Realschule.

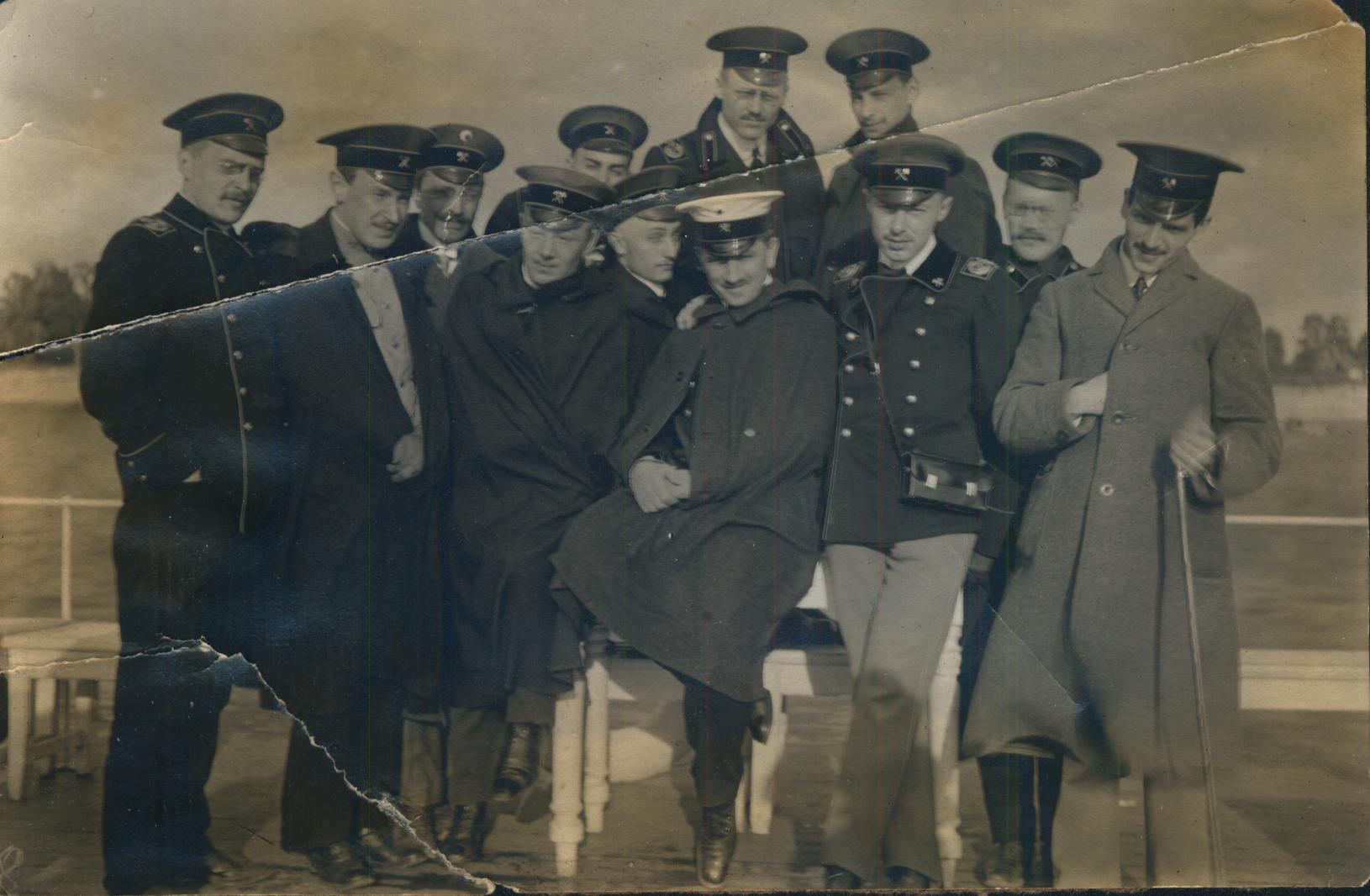
N.N. Dobrokhotov(leftmost) with classmates in the institute. 1912 year

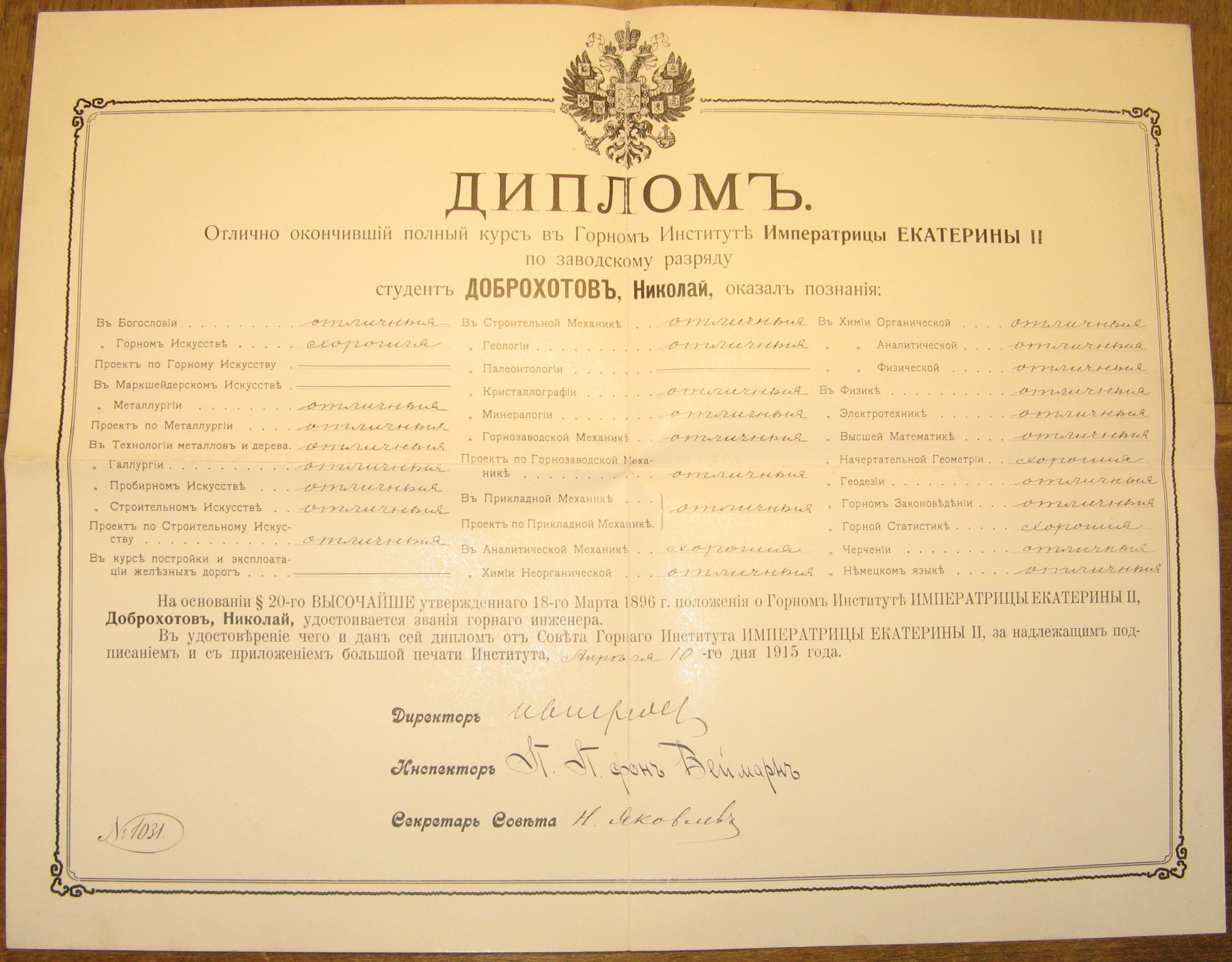
N.N. Dobrokhotov's Diploma of graduation from Mining Institute

In 1907 he graduated from the Realschule and successfully passed the competitive examination in the metallurgical department of the Saint Petersburg Mining Institute. Here many famous professors and lecturers taught: E.S. Fyodorov on crystallography, N.S. Kurnakov on chemistry, I.A. Time on metallurgical engineering, A.F. Ioffe on thermodynamics, A.L. Baboshin on metallography and others.

During his student years Nikolay Dobrokhotov actively collaborated in the student metallurgical study group, many times underwent practical training on metallurgical plants, worked as a designer, as a Martin foreman and held some other posts. In December 1914 he graduates from the institute.

In 1914–1917 years Nikolay Dobrokhotov works on Perm Ordnance Factory, where he was engaged on mastering and improving the technology of artillery steel production.

On May 11, 1915, Nikolay Dobrokhotov marries Elizaveta Ivanovna Zventsova (1891-1978) - daughter of Ivan Vasilievich Zventsov, a member of Zemsky Court in Kashin. Nikolay Dobrokhotov had 6 children, two of them died at an early age.

In 1920 Nikolay Dobrokhotov joined as an Assistant Lecturer the Metallurgy Department of the Saint Petersburg Mining Institute, which was headed by Prof. V.N. Lipin. Here he worked till 1924. In these years Nikolay Dobrokhotov is formed as an independent young scientist - he explores some of the issues of gas-furnace heating engineering and publish many works in this area.

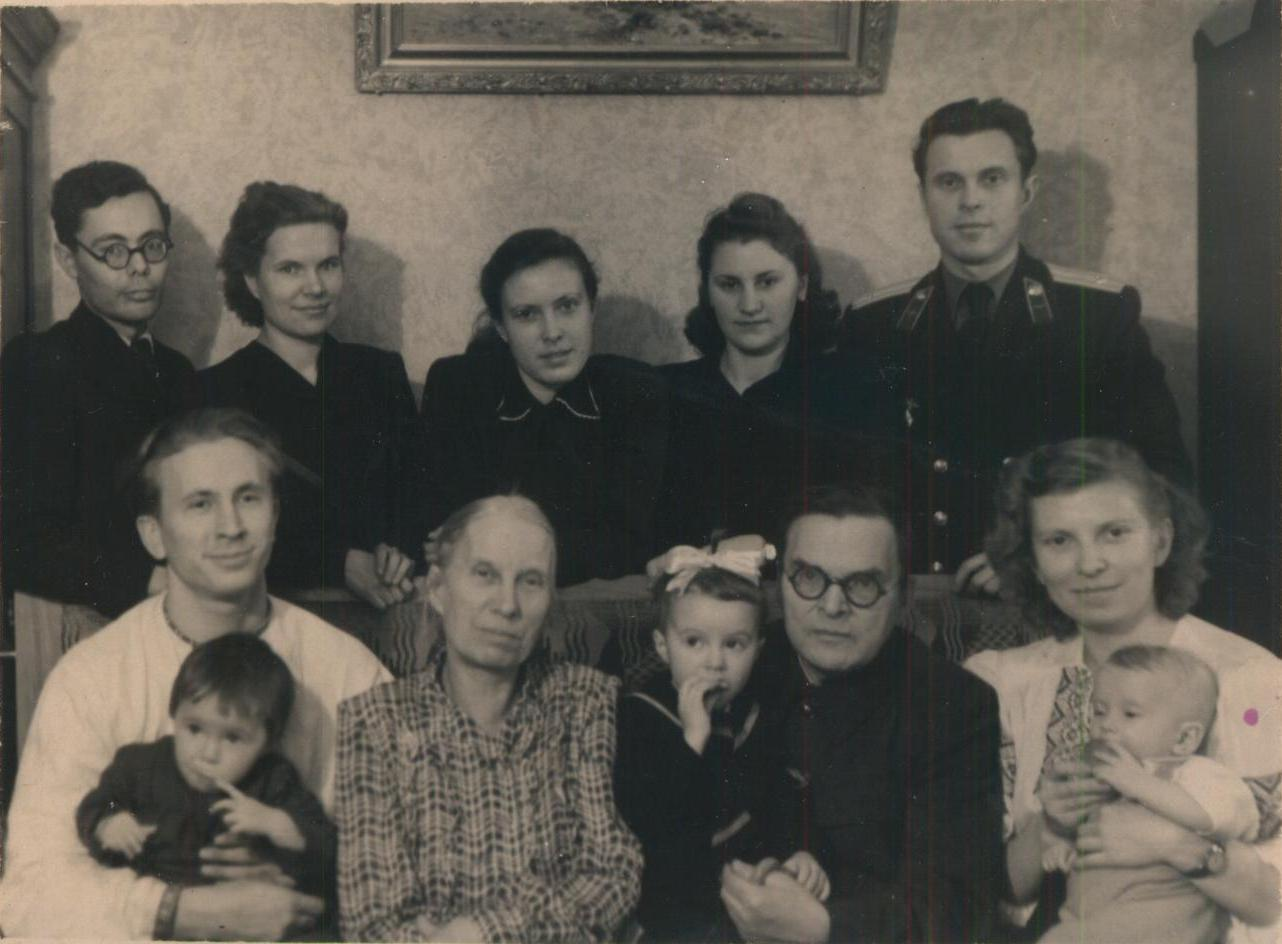
N.N. Dobrokhotov with family

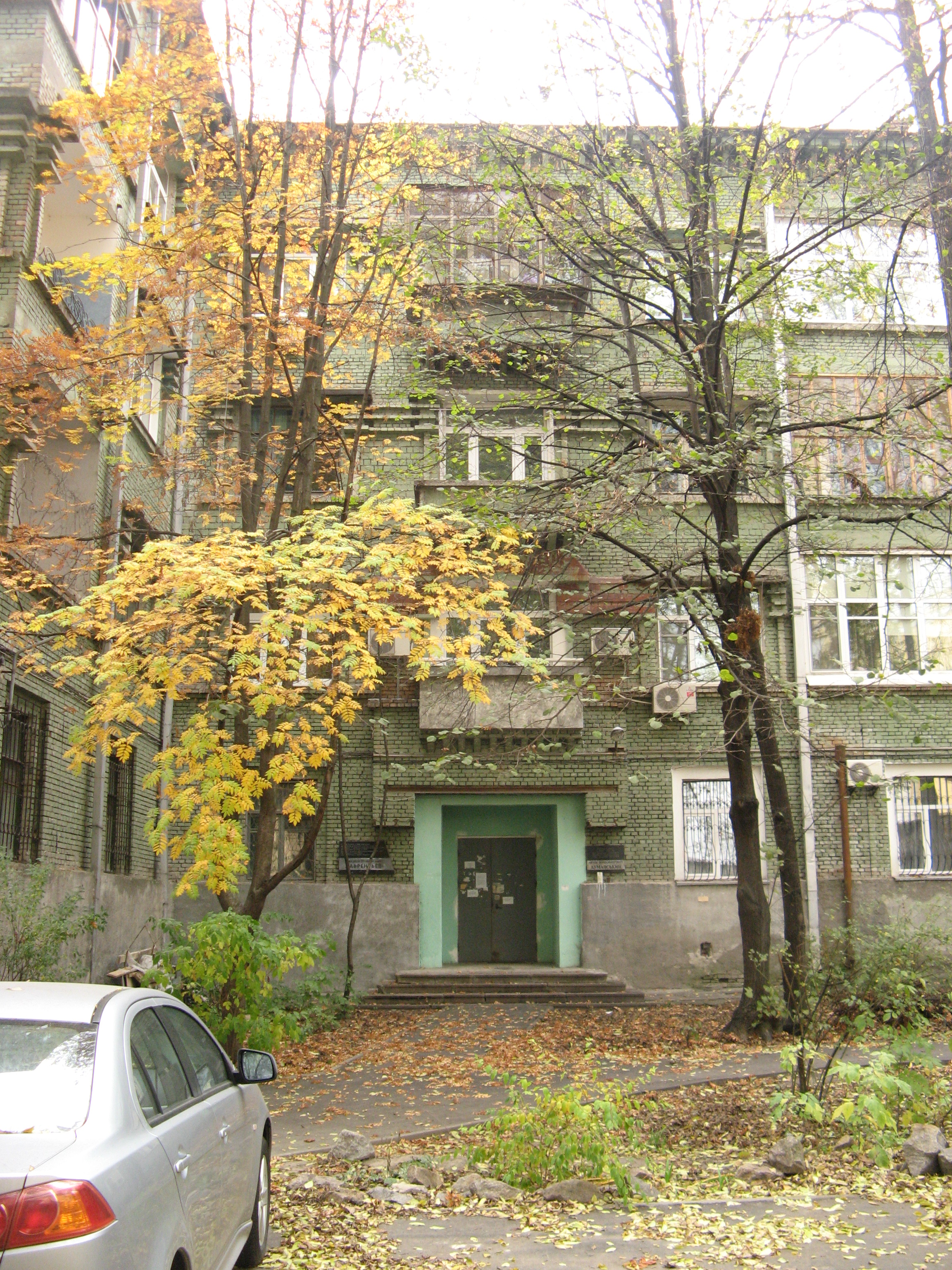
House in Kiev where lived and worked N.N. Dobrokhotov

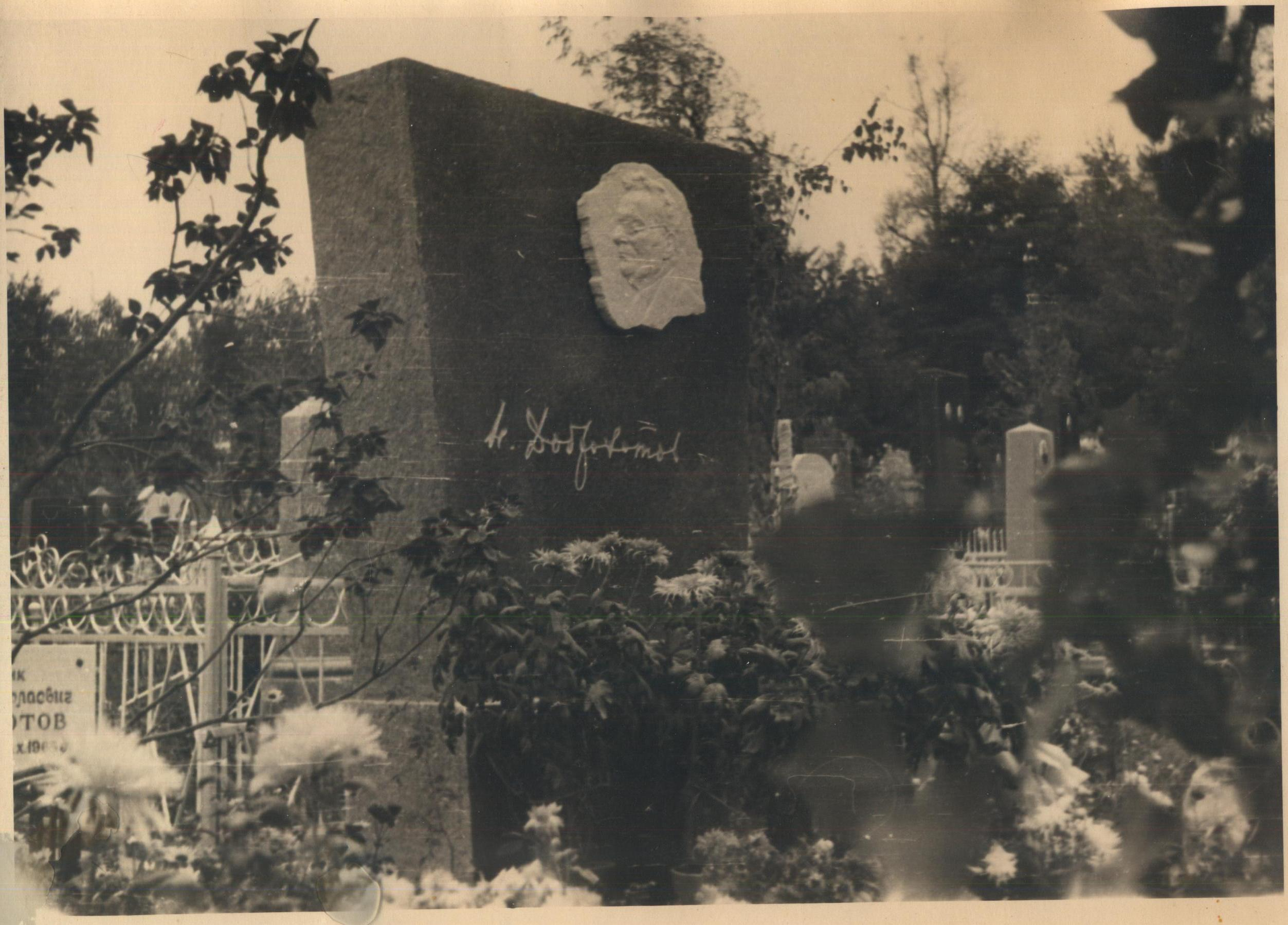
Grave of N.N. Dobrokhotov at Baikove Cemetery in Kiev

Memorial plaque of N.N. Dobrokhotov on the building of Institute of Gas in Kiev

In November 1924 Nikolay Dobrokhotov was appointed head of the Department of steel metallurgy and theory of furnaces of Ural Polytechnic Institute (which until then was headed by prof. V.E.Grum-Grzhimailo) and according to the decision of the State Academic Council of Narkompros of RSFSR of June 4, 1926, was approved in the academic rank of professor in the Department of steel metallurgy.

The fall of 1929 Nikolay Dobrokhotov leaving on a business trip to metallurgical plants in Germany and the U.S.

In 1930 in Sverdlovsk was arrested on charges of "wrecking" (sabotage). Then was arrested almost the entire management team of scientists and teachers of Ural Polytechnic Institute. On August 20, 1931, Sverdlovsk OGPU released Nikolay Dobrokhotov from custody by order of Moscow OGPU. To the release of Nikolay Dobrokhotov contributed Ekaterina Pavlovna Peshkova, wife of Gorky.

In 1931, Nikolay Dobrokhotov moved to Moscow, started working the head of the furnace laboratory of the Central Research Institute of Machine Building and performed together with his staff research in gas-furnace heating engineering. Since January 1935 he was again working on his main speciality as a professor, head of the Department of steel metallurgy of Dnepropetrovsk Metallurgical Institute.

By decision of the Higher Attestation Commission on April 11, 1938, Nikolay Dobrokhotov was approved in the degree of Doctor of Technical Sciences. By General Meeting of the Ukrainian SSR Academy of Sciences on February 22, 1939, Nikolay Dobrokhotov was elected an Academician of the Ukrainian SSR Academy of Sciences. On April 9, 1939, for his successful work in the ferrous metallurgy Nikolay Dobrokhotov was awarded the Order of the Red Banner of Labour. In the same year Nikolay Dobrokhotov was elected to the Dnipropetrovsk Oblast Council of People's Deputies.

In August 1941 Nikolay Dobrokhotov evacuated to the Urals. During the German-Soviet War, he was associated with 16 plants, providing them with scientific and technical assistance in gas-furnace heating engineering and steel metallurgy, for which he was awarded a Medal for Valiant Labor in the Great Patriotic War of 1941-1945 and decorations as an eminent person in Tank and Metallurgical Industry.

In December 1944 Nikolay Dobrokhotov moved to Kiev, worked as head of steel-smelting department of Ferrous Metallurgy Institute of the Ukrainian SSR Academy of Sciences and the head of the Department of steel metallurgy and industrial furnaces of Kiev Polytechnic Institute.

On December 14, 1948, by General Meeting of the Ukrainian SSR Academy of Sciences Nikolay Dobrokhotov was elected a Chairman of the Bureau of the Department of technical sciences of the Ukrainian SSR Academy of Sciences. On initiative of Nikolay Dobrokhotov was created the Gas Institute of the Ukrainian SSR Academy of Sciences and he was appointed its director from September 1, 1949. By decree of the Presidium of the Supreme Soviet of the Ukrainian SSR dated February 3, 1951, Nikolay Dobrokhotov was given the rank of Honored Worker of Science and Technology of the Ukrainian SSR. By decree of the Presidium of the Supreme Soviet of the Ukrainian SSR dated May 3, 1954, Nikolay Dobrokhotov was awarded the Order of Lenin and by decree dated July 19, 1958, he was awarded the Order of the Red Banner of Labour.

October 15, 1963, in Kiev, Nikolay Dobrokhotov died. He was buried in the Baykove cemetery of Kiev. In the name of Nikolay Dobrokhotov in Kiev was called street (Academic Dobrokhotov Street).

== Scientific and applied activities ==
In 1921 was published the first scientific paper of Nikolay Dobrokhotov "About burning of oil shale in the gas generators". Nikolay Dobrokhotov created a new theory of furnaces, which was fundamentally different from the hydraulic (prevalent in the 1930s) in the substantive provisions and practical conclusions. He first showed that the movement of gases in furnaces is turbulent and not laminar in nature, and therefore the processes of mixing gas and combustion of fuel run through the laws of the turbulent and not laminar flow. Its essence is as follows:

- to improve heat transfer by convection and radiation, gases must move in the working space of the furnace as close to the surface of the heated subjects with the greatest possible speed;
- combustion of fuel at high temperatures is determined by the conditions of mixing it with oxygen. The chemical reaction of combustion occurs very quickly and does not limit the rate of fuel combustion process;
- length of the turbulent flame is proportional to the diameter of the fuel jet and does not increase with increasing of heat load at a constant ratio of fuel and air;
- geometric pressure of gases in furnaces is small in comparison with the kinetic energy of gases. Effect of geometric pressure can be neglected, considering only the forces of inertia and kinetic energy of gas flows.
- capacity of the furnace is necessary to determine not only by the quantity of supplied fuel in it, but the oxygen consumed by the furnace for combustion of fuel;
- the choice of transporting system of processed and received materials in the furnace, which determines the type of the furnace and is its main feature, is very important.

This theory has opened new directions in the design of compact furnaces with forced movement of gases.

In 1931–1935, he developed a new theory of metal heating and experimentally proved that the steel can be heated very quickly, ensuring high performance of furnaces with a perfect metal quality and its low waste. He also suggested a method of calculating the thermal and structural stresses arising during heating of steel products, that was the basis for the development of heating conditions, radically improved the process. Nikolay Dobrokhotov shown theoretically and in practice has proved the possibility and desirability of a sharp acceleration in the heating of steel products without deterioration, that completely changed the prevailing views on the permissible rate of their heating.

Nikolay Dobrokhotov designed the heating furnaces and their equipment more than 35 years. According to his projects in 1929-1930 were built heating furnaces in rolling mills of Nizhneserginski and Nizhny Tagil metallurgical plants.

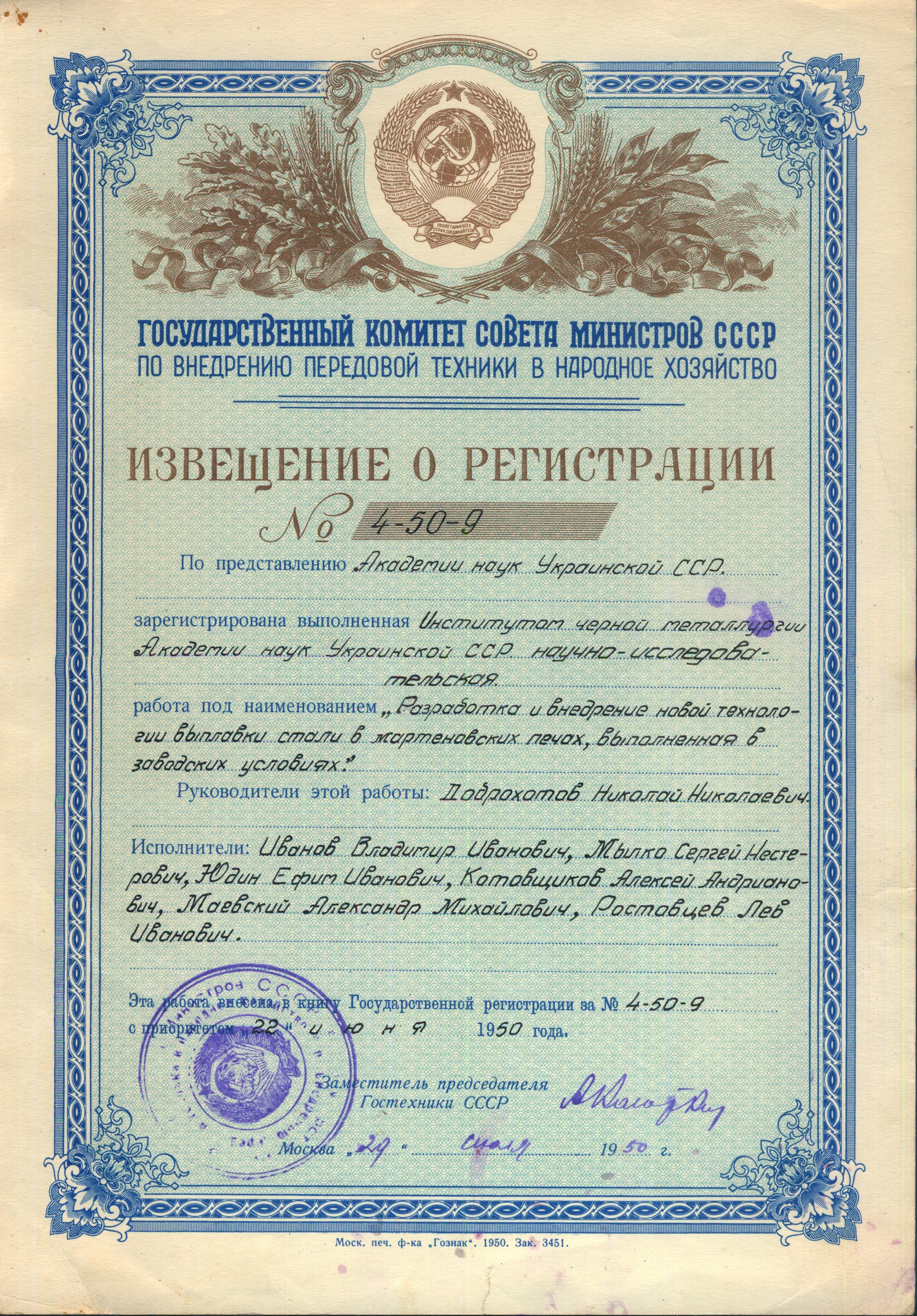
Document of registration of scientific work by N.N. Dobrokhotov

N. Dobrokhotov proposed to increase the capacity of open-hearth furnaces to increase their productivity and reduce fuel consumption in steel smelting and later formulated the basic theses of the theory of intensification of heat work of open-hearth furnaces. With the use of the provisions made by him in the mid-1930s were upgraded 90-ton open-hearth furnaces of Nizhnedneprovsk metallurgical plant in the name of Comintern. Increased heat output of the furnaces made it possible to dramatically raise their productivity and exceed all previously known records of high-speed steelification. Later was improved design of open-hearth furnaces of many metallurgical plants. N. Dobrokhotov proposed to equip open-hearth furnaces with fans for air supply, with smoke exhausters for removal of combustion products, with front wall without arch and improved refrigerators.

During the German-Soviet War, N. Dobrokhotov offers to hold ferromanganese deoxidation of boiling steel in the ladle, that was implemented in 1942 in one of the Ural plants. This method saved a large amount of ferromanganese, since when steel is deoxidized in the furnace of about 50% of it oxidized and was lost with the slag. For that time when as a result of military actions was lost main extraction base of manganese ore, this fact was of great importance.

After World War II, N. Dobrokhotov, together with his disciples developed a theory of drying and firing of ceramic products based on a fundamentally new method. He scientifically substantiated, fast drying and firing modes of production, identified ways to improve the quality of ceramics. Under his guidance and direct participation was designed and put into operation at the Kiev factory of ceramic blocks first in Ukraine a strong tunnel kiln for firing of building and ceramic products.

Technology and technique of using of natural gas in open-hearth production of the Soviet Union created mainly through the works of N. Dobrokhotov. Before him, the natural gas was used in a mixture with fuel oil. In 1959, N. Dobrokhotov with students suggested to heat three-way open-hearth furnaces with natural gas instead of a mixture of coke oven and blast-furnace gas. The method was first introduced at several furnaces of Zaporizhstal and K. Liebknecht plants, and then - in many plants of the country.

N. Dobrokhotov develops basic theory and practice of deoxidation and alloying of finished steel in ladle with solid ferroalloys, use of which radically improved steelmaking process. It was first tested at the Volgograd metallurgical plant "Red October", and later - at the Izhevsk metallurgical plant in the name of 50 years of the USSR, at Kuznetsk metallurgical plant in the name of Lenin and at other plants. Implementing of it made it possible to increase the productivity of smelting furnaces, reduce haze of alloy additions and deoxidants, reduce the cost of steel and improve the quality of the material.

N. Dobrokhotov developed a scientific basis for steel pouring at high temperatures to improve the quality, that gave rise to a new direction in the field of steel pouring to ingots and obtaining shaped steel casts, thereby improving their quality at all indicators. Before him there was an erroneous opinion that it was necessary to pour steel as slowly as possible. He laid the scientific basis for high-speed pouring of steel and has proved, that steel can be poured in three to four times faster without compromising quality of ingots. This increased the productivity of pouring bays of open-hearth workshops and twice reduced the employment of pouring spaces and equipment.

N. Dobrokhotov proposed a new technology of direct receipt of iron from ore. By his instructions on metallurgical plant "Zaporizhstal" in the name of S. Ordzhonikidze were constructed semi-industrial devices - shaft furnace and the boiling bed reactor for direct reduction of iron by products of conversion of natural gas, by which were obtained necessary basic data for designing industrial units of this type.

== Major works ==
1. Furnaces for metal heating / D.V. Budrin, M.V. Groshev, V.F.Kopytov et al. Edited by academician N.N. Dobrokhotov M.-L.: GOSNTIML, 1941, 416 p. (in Russian)

2. Dobrokhotov N.N. About the dynamics of diffusion processes / Kiev: AS USSR, 1948, 39 p. (in Russian)

3. "Dobrokhotov N.N. Modern technology of steel smelting in open-hearth furnaces / Kiev: AS USSR, 1951, 56 p. (in Russian)". Archived from the original on 2011-10-09.

4. "Dobrokhotov N.N. Application of thermodynamics in metallurgy / Kiev: AS USSR, 1955, 76p. (in Russian)". Archived from the original on 2011-10-09.
