= Anastasia Rybachenko =

Russian political and civic activist

- Born: Anastasia Aleksandrovna Rybachenko; 11 September 1991 (age 34); Moscow, Russian SFSR, Soviet Union
- Education: State Academic University for the Humanities, Tallinn University of Technology (BA), Freie Universität Berlin (MA)
- Website: facebook.com/AnaRybachenko

Anastasia Rybachenko (Russian: Анастасия Александровна Рыбаченко) (born 11 September 1991) is a former Russian politician currently working in business consulting. Rybachenko previously served as a member of the Political Council, the head of the Youth Committee and a spokesperson with the Moscow branch of the "Solidarnost" movement from March 2008 to June 2012.

== Education ==
Rybachenko studied political science at the State Academic University for the Humanities in Moscow. In 2012, she transferred to Tallinn University of Technology and graduated with a major in international relations in 2014. She earned her master's degree in regional studies from Freie Universität Berlin in 2016. She wrote her master's thesis about the Organization for Security and Co-operation in Europe and the role of its field operations in conflict prevention and crisis management.

Rybachenko speaks Russian, English, French, German and Chinese.

== Politics ==
In December 2008, Rybachenko joined Solidarnost, a newly founded democratic political movement.

In 2009, Rybachenko supported Sergei Davidis, member of the Political Council of Solidarnost, during his run for the 2009 Moscow City Duma election. She worked as a member of his political campaign staff.

In 2010, Rybachenko was elected to the Political Council of Solidarnost's Moscow branch, and became its youngest member aged 18 years old. In 2011, she was re-elected.

In December 2010, Rybachenko traveled to Minsk to observe the 2010 Belarusian presidential election. After the demonstrations that followed the election, Rybachenko initiated a campaign in Moscow to support the Russian citizens arrested in Belarus. Activists of Solidarnost maintained media campaign and collected signatures in front of the Russian Ministry of Foreign Affairs. The campaigners advocated for the release of two Russian citizens arrested in Belarus, Ivan Gaponov and Artyom Breus. Later activists also called for the release of a Belarusian citizen Fedor Mirzayanov, in order to, as activists maintained, represent interests of his father, a citizen of Russia. Gaponov and Breus were released. In the case of Mirzayanov, the Russian embassy in Minsk observed the trial, but Mirzayanov was nevertheless sentenced to three years in prison.

In March 2011, Rybachenko became the head of the Youth Committee of Solidarnost's Moscow branch. She organized lectures of politicians and other public figures at Moscow universities (Yulia Latynina, Vladimir Ryzhkov, Valery Panyushkin and Mikhail Delyagin).

In March 2012, Rybachenko became the head of the press office of Solidarnost's Moscow branch. She recruited and trained volunteers for the press office, managed relations with the media representatives, in particular for the campaign of Solidarnost to support Yevgeny Urlashov in the mayoral election in the large Russian city of Yaroslavl.

Rybachenko took part in the major Russian protests that started in 2011 following the Russian legislative election and continued into 2012.

In June 2012, Rybachenko moved abroad for her studies at Tallinn University of Technology. She then stopped her political activities in Russia.

== Career ==
Rybachenko worked at the office of the Organization for Security and Co-operation in Europe in the Netherlands, as well as at the OSCE headquarters in Vienna. Rybachenko specializes in project management for business and government organizations across various countries of Europe.
