= Alexander Dobrokhotov =

Russian philosopher and historian (1950)

- Александр Доброхотов
- Born: 8 September 1950 (age 76); Lviv, Ukrainian Soviet Socialist Republic, Soviet Union
- Children: Roman Dobrokhotov

Education
- Education: Moscow State University
- Theses: Parmenides' Teachings on Being (1978); The Category of Being in Ancient Philosophy of the Classical Period (1990)

Philosophical work
- Era: 20th-century philosophy, 21st-century philosophy
- Region: Russian philosophy
- School: Metaphysics; Idealism
- Main interests: History of Russian culture; History of philosophy; Metaphysics; Russian philosophy; Ancient philosophy; Medieval philosophy; Kant; German Idealism; Philosophy of culture
- Notable ideas: Teleology of culture; Justification of the study of culture; Philosophical and cultural implications of cogito; Metaphysics of power in the Russian culture; Dante as a philosopher; Philosophy of the Russian symbolism; Heterogeneity and isomorphism of cultural artefacts
- Website: https://www.hse.ru/en/org/persons/136024

Alexander Lvovich Dobrokhotov (Russian: Александр Львович Доброхотов; born 8 September 1950) is a Russian philosopher, historian of philosophy, historian of culture, and university professor. He holds the title of distinguished professor at Lomonosov Moscow State University. He specialises in the history of Russian culture, history of philosophy, metaphysics, Russian philosophy, ancient and medieval philosophy, Kant and German Idealism, and philosophy of culture. He is a Visiting Senior Research Fellow, King’s College London; and a researcher at the Independent Institute of Philosophy (Institut de philosophie indépendant; IPHI) in Paris, France. (The Independent Institute of Philosophy was founded in November 2022 by Russian philosophers who left the Russian Federation in dissent from the politics of the Russian authorities that led to a humanitarian catastrophe as a result of the military aggression against Ukraine.)

== Education ==
From 1967 to 1972, Alexander Dobrokhotov was an undergraduate student in philosophy at the Faculty of Philosophy, Moscow State University. From 1972 to 1975, he was a graduate student in philosophy at the Department of Western Philosophy History, Faculty of Philosophy, at Moscow State University. In 1978, he defended his PhD dissertation (‘kandidatskaya’) titled 'Parmenides' Teachings on Being’. In 1990, he defended his second dissertation (‘doktorskaya’) titled 'The Category of Being in Ancient Philosophy of the Classical Period’.

== Academic life ==
Alexander Dobrokhotov started his academic career as a historian of Ancient Greek Philosophy and as an interpreter of Parmenides' and Heraclitus’ theories of being. His studies resulted in several books, one of which, ‘The Category of Being in Classical West-European Philosophy’ (1986), summarises his main ideas.

From 1988 to 1995, Dobrokhotov was the chair of the Department of Cultural History of the Moscow Institute of Physics and Technology. Between 1994 and 2010, Dobrokhotov was a professor at the State Academic University for the Humanities. From 1995 to 2009, Alexander Dobrokhotov was the head of the History and Theory of World Culture Department at the Faculty of Philosophy, Moscow State University. The department was created in 1990. Many prominent Soviet and Russian scholars like Viacheslav Ivanov, Sergei Sergejewitsch Awerinzew, Aron Gurevich, Mikhail Gasparov, Georgii Knabe, Yeleazar Meletinsky, Vladimir Romanov, Tatiana Vasilieva, Nina Braginskaia, Vladimir Bibikhin have worked there. From 1995 to 2015, Alexander Dobrokhotov taught at the Graduate School of European Cultures (VSHEK) which is an international training and research centre at Russian State University for the Humanities (VSHEK was established in April 2007 and replaced the Institute of European Cultures). Between 2005 and 2017, Dobrokhotov was the head of the Department of Culturology at Saint Tikhon's Orthodox University. From 2009 until April 2024, Alexander Dobrokhotov is also a professor at the National Research University Higher School of Economics (HSE), at the School of Cultural Studies (in the autumn of 2020, the School of Cultural Studies merged with the School of Philosophy and the School of Philosophy and Cultural Studies was established). He teaches various courses on philosophy, philosophy of culture, metaphysics and theology, history of Russian culture. In 2010, he became a tenured professor at HSE.

Today, Alexander Dobrokhotov is a leading Russian philosopher of culture and prominent scholar in culturology. He often appears on television. In 2021, Alexander Dobrokhotov left Russia. Since April 2024, he runs his own YouTube channel.

== International recognition ==
Alexander Dobrokhotov is a member of the International Advisory Board of the journal Studies in East European Thought.

Since 1989, he has been a member of the International Association of Researchers in Greek Philosophy (Athens, Greece).

Since 1995, he has been a member of the International Genealogical Society (Oslo, Norway).

In 1992, he was a visiting professor at the Catholic University of Tilburg (the Netherlands).

In 1992, he was a visiting professor at the University of Fribourg (Switzerland).

From 1996 to 1997, he was a visiting professor at the University of Geneva (Switzerland).

Dobrokhotov has taught a massive online course on Coursera.

In 2010, leading experts in the humanities in Russia published a book on Dobrokhotov's 60th anniversary: Culture and Form: On the 60th Anniversary of A. L. Dobrokhotov. Moscow: Publishing House of the National Research University Higher School of Economics, 2010.

In 2023, the Dutch philosopher Evert van der Zweerde wrote an article about Alexander Dobrokhotov: ‘Beyond the Divide. Introducing the Work of Aleksandr L’vovich Dobrokhotov’. Studies in East European Thought, vol. 75, no. 1, Mar. 2023, pp. 119–23.

== Philosophy ==
In late 1980s and early 1990s, the academic disciplinary landscape on the territory of the former Soviet Union underwent significant changes. Some disciplines based on Marxism–Leninism ceased to exist, and a number of new disciplines in the humanities and social sciences appeared. Among the new fields there was an approach towards culture within the Russian humanities which came to be known as ‘culturology’ (kulturologia). There have been many versions of this discipline, and Alexander Dobrokhotov became the founder of his own original version of culturology, based on the Kantian and Hegelian philosophical traditions and on the Russian philosophy on the Silver Age. He regards studies of culture as a combination of theoretical philosophy of culture on one hand, and empirical studies on the other hand.

In his works on philosophy of culture, he argues that ‘Culture’ can be regarded as an independent regional of being, alongside ‘Nature’ and ‘Spirit’. He defines Culture as the universe of artefacts. The artefact is the result of an objectification of Spirit and an anthropomorphization of Nature. In this respect, culture mediates Nature and Spirit. Culture makes obsolete the ontological conflict between Nature and Spirit. In their place, two other ontological conflicts appear: the conflict between Nature and Culture, and between Culture and Spirit. Alexander Dobrokhotov further argues that Culture is not a mechanism of human adaptation to the natural environment, but is rather an ontological wholeness, with its own aim setting, or, in his terms, ‘teleologism’. Pure or transcendental forms set aims for culture. This idea stems from works by Plato, Leibniz, Kant, and Husserl. Each artefact of Culture is created in order to take its place within the ontological wholeness, and thus, alongside its concrete meaning or function, it also contains a latent interpretation of the wholeness. ‘How should the world look like so that I could be a part of it?’ — this is the question which each artefact answers.

From this follows an empirical method which forms the foundation of the empirical discipline of culturology. This method involves reconstructing the ontological wholeness from the individual artefact. In other words, the method involves answering the question of how the world should look like so that the artefact could be a part of it. Furthermore, if the wholeness is the same for all its artefacts, an isomorphism of heterogeneous artefacts can be discovered. Hence, the main question of the empirical study of culture is ‘How can we reconcile the heterogeneity and isomorphism of cultural artefacts?’

In his numerous empirical studies of culture, Alexander Dobrokhotov demonstrates how his theory and method work. He reveals the underlying isomorphism in works by Goethe, Friedrich Nietzsche, and Pablo Picasso; in quantum mechanics and avant-garde in art; in the 18th-century philosophy of mind and the novel; in theology and Alfred Hitchcock’s films.

== Bibliography ==
=== Books in Russian ===
- Философия культуры: учебник для вузов. М.: Издательский дом НИУ ВШЭ, 2016. (Philosophy of Culture. Moscow, 2016)
- Телеология культуры. М.: Прогресс-Традиция, 2016. (Teleology of Culture. Moscow, 2016)
- Избранное. М.: Территория будущего, 2008. (Selected Works. Moscow, 2008.)
- Данте. М.: Мысль, 1980. (Dante. Moscow, 1990. 208 pages.)
- Категория бытия в классической западноевропейской философии. М.: Изд-во Московского университета, 1986. (The Category of Being in Classical European Philosophy. Moscow, 1986. [Abstract in German]. 248 pages.)
- Учение досократиков о бытии. М.: Изд-во Московского университета, 1980. (Pre-Socratics' Teachings on Being. Moscow, 1980. 84 pages.)

=== Publications in English ===
- 'The Defeated Judge the Victors, or Bolshevism in Post-October Russian Thought'. In: At the Vanishing Point in History. Critical Perspectives on the Russia‒Ukraine War. Bloomsbury Academic. 2025.
- ‘Aza A. Takho-Godi’s Contribution to the History of Ideas and Concepts’. Studies in East European Thought, vol. 75, no. 1, Mar. 2023, pp. 1–8. Springer Link, https://doi.org/10.1007/s11212-022-09538-2.
- ‘Lev P. Karsavin on the Phenomenology of Revolution’. Russian Studies in Philosophy, vol. 60, no. 6, Nov. 2022, pp. 452–61. Taylor and Francis+NEJM, https://doi.org/10.1080/10611967.2022.2155010.
- ‘“Those Born in Godforsaken Years . . .”’ Russian Studies in Philosophy, vol. 59, no. 6, Nov. 2021, pp. 489–500. tandfonline.com (Atypon), https://doi.org/10.1080/10611967.2021.2010474.
- ‘Vyacheslav Ivanov on Pushkin’s The Gypsies: The Antinomy of Individualism and Freedom’. Russian Studies in Philosophy, vol. 57, no. 3, May 2019, pp. 260–69. Taylor and Francis+NEJM, https://doi.org/10.1080/10611967.2019.1629210.
- ‘“Mystical Antinomism.” Losev’s Assessments and Interpretations of Goethe’. Russian Studies in Philosophy, vol. 56, no. 6, Nov. 2018, pp. 467–76. Taylor and Francis+NEJM, https://doi.org/10.1080/10611967.2018.1529974.
- 'The Revolutions of 1917 in the Philosophy of the Russian Symbolism', Social Science Research Network, 12 Apr. 2017. papers.ssrn.com, https://doi.org/10.2139/ssrn.2951595.
- ‘What the Russian Symbolists Heard in the “Music of Revolution”: Philosophical Implications’. Studies in East European Thought, vol. 69, no. 4, Dec. 2017, pp. 287–304. Springer Link, https://doi.org/10.1007/s11212-017-9293-x.
- The Austrian Experience: The Mamardashvili Variant. In: Transcultural Studies: A Journal in Interdisciplinary Research. Vol. 5 No. 1 2009 [2015] Special Issue: Merab Mamardashvili: Transcultural Philosopher. pp. 65–73.
- Descartes and Dostoyevski: two modes of ‘cogito’. National Research University Higher School of Economics (HSE). Basic Research Program. Working Papers. Series: Humanities, WP BRP 89/HUM/2015. Moscow, 2015.
- Dobrokhotov, Alexander. L. ‘The Spiritual Meaning of War in the Philosophy of the Russian Silver Age’. Studies in East European Thought, vol. 66, no. 1, June 2014, pp. 69–76. Springer Link, https://doi.org/10.1007/s11212-014-9198-x.
- The Problem of the "I" as a Culturological Topic. In: Russian Studies in Philosophy 10/2013; 52(2): P. 61–79.
- The short happy life of Goethe's Faust, or hieros gamos as the center of the tragedy. National Research University Higher School of Economics (HSE). Basic Research Program. Working Papers. Series: Humanities, WP BRP 15/HUM/2013. Moscow, 2013. P. 1–14.
- ‘GAKhN: An Aesthetics of Ruins, or Aleksej Losev’s Failed Project’. Studies in East European Thought, vol. 63, no. 1, Feb. 2011, pp. 31–42. Springer Link, https://doi.org/10.1007/s11212-010-9131-x.
- ‘The Austrian Experience: The Mamardashvili Variant’. Transcultural Studies, vol. 5, no. 1–2, 2009, pp. 65–73. Scholars Portal Journals, https://doi.org/10.1163/23751606-00501006.
- “A short course on world culture.” In: Intellectual News. 2001. No. 9. P. 50–53.
- “You know - therefore, you ought to. (Ethical Implications of the «Cogito»).” In: How Natural is the Ethical Law? Tilburg, 1997.
- “The Thesis "Soma - Sema" And Its Philosophical Implications.” In: Pythagorean Philosophy. Athens, 1992.

=== Publications in other languages ===
- Die Rezeption der klassischen deutschen Ästhetik in den Arbeiten und Diskussionen der GAChN. In: Kunst als Sprache – Sprachen der Kunst. Russische Ästhetik und Kunsttheorie der 1920er Jahre in der europäischen Diskussion. Sonderheft12 der “Zeitschrift für Ästhetik und Allgemeine Kunstwissenschaft”. Felix Meiner Verlag, 2014. S. 225 – 246.
- Le probleme du “Moi” dans la philosophie de Vladimir Soloviev et de l’Age d’argent. In: Revue philosophique de France et de l’étranger. N°3-2014. (2014 – 139e Annee – Tome CCVI) P. 297 – 314.
- “Kants Teleologie als Kulturtheorie.” In: Kant im Spiegel der russischen Kantforschung heute. Frommann-Holzboog Verlag. Stuttgart-Bad, 2008. S. 19–27.
- “Antignostische Momente in Hegels Spekulation.” In: Die Folgen des Hegelianismus: Philosophie, Religion und Politik im Abschied von der Moderne. Hrsg. von Peter Koslowski. München. Wilhelm Fink Verlag, 1998. S. 137–146.
- “Die Evolution der russischen Henologie im ersten Viertel des XX. Jahrhunderts.” In: Henologische Perspektiven II. (Elementa. Bd. 69) Amsterdam-Atlanta. 1997.
- “La philosophie: en attendant Godot.” In: Esprit. Paris, 1996, # 22–3.
- “Das Individuum als Traeger der Macht: Destruktion der Ideale.” In: Miscellanea Mediaevalia. Bd.24. Individuum und Individualitaet im Mittelalter. Berlin - New-York, 1996.
- “Behovet av metafysik.” Ord & Bild. # 1–2. Goeteborg.1994. S. 165 - 171.
- “Metaphysik und Herrschaft: die "Russische Idee" als Ursprung einer Kultur des authoritaeren Denkens und Handelns.” In: Studies in Soviet Thought 44. 1992. Kluwer Academic Publishers. S.11-17.
- “Mensch und Natur im "Fegefeuer" Dantes.” In: Miscellanea Mediaevalia. Bd.21/2. Berlin-New York, 1992. S. 791-794.
- “Welches sind die wirklichen Fortschritte, die die Metaphysik seit Parmenides Zeiten gemacht hat?” In: La Parola del Passato. Rivista di studi antichi. Vol. XLIII. Napoli, 1988. S. 127–142.
- “L'Etre dans la philosophie antique et l'ontologie ouest-europeenne.” In: La philosophie grecque et sa portee culturelle et historique. Moscou, 1985, p. 138-157.
- “Heraklit: Fragment B52.” In: Studien zur Geschichte der westlichen Philosophie. Fr.a.M., 1986. S. 55–71.

== See also ==
- Aron Gurevich
- Mikhail Gasparov
- Philosophy of culture
- Viacheslav Ivanov
- List of Russian philosophers
- Philosophy in the Soviet Union
- Aleksei Losev
- Tartu–Moscow Semiotic School
- Juri Lotman
- Russian symbolism
- Silver Age of Russian Poetry
