= Culturology =

Branch of social sciences

Culturology or the science of culture is a branch of the social sciences concerned with the scientific understanding, description, analysis, and prediction of cultures as a whole. While ethnology and anthropology studied different cultural practices, such studies included diverse aspects: sociological, psychological, etc., and the need was recognized for a discipline focused exclusively on cultural aspects.

== In Russia ==
The notion of culturology (Russian: культурология), as an interdisciplinary branch of the humanities, may be traced in the Soviet Union to the late 1960s and associated with the work of Mikhail Bakhtin, Aleksei Losev, Sergey Averintsev, Georgy Gachev, Juri Lotman, Vyacheslav Ivanov, Vladimir Toporov, Edward Markarian, and others. This kind of research challenged Marxist socio-political approach to culture.

Between 1980 and 1990, culturology received official recognition in Russia and was legalized as a form of science and a subject of study for institutions of higher learning. After the dissolution of the Soviet Union, it was introduced into the Higher Attestation Commission's list of specialties for which scientific degrees may be awarded in Russia and is now a subject of study during the first year at institutions of higher education and in secondary schools. Defined as the study of human cultures, their integral systems, and their influence on human behavior, it may be formally compared to the Western discipline of cultural studies, although it has a number of important distinctions.

Over past decades the following basic cultural schools were formed:

- philosophy of culture (A. Arnold, G. V. Drach, N. S. Zlobin, M. S. Kagan, V. M. Mezhuyev, Y. N. Solonin, M. B. Turov and others)
- theory of culture (B. S. Yerasov, A. S. Karmin, V. A. Lukov, A. A. Pelipenko, E. V Sokolov, A. Ya. Fliyer and others),
- cultural history (S. N. Ikonnikova, I. V. Kondakov, E. A. Shulepova, I. G. Yakovenko and others),
- sociology of culture (I. Akhiezer, L. G. Ionin, L. N. Kogan, A. I. Shendrik and others),
- cultural anthropology (A. A. Belik, Ye. A. Orlova, A. S. Orlov-Kretschmer, Yu. M.. Reznik and others),
- applied cultural studies (O. Astaf'eva, I. M. Bykhovskaya and others),
- cultural studies art (K. E. Razlogov, N. A. Hrenov and others),
- semiotics of culture (Juri Lotman, V. N. Toporov, V. V. Ivanov, E. M. Meletinsky and others),
- cultural education (G. I. Zvereva, A. I. Kravchenko, T. F. Kuznetsova, L. M. Mosolova and others).

From 1992, research was started by the Russian Institute for Cultural Research. Today, along the line of the central office located in Moscow, three branches of RIC have been opened – Siberian (opened in 1993 in Omsk), St. Petersburg Department (opened in 1997) and the Southern Branch (opened in 2012 in Krasnodar).

=== Culturology studies at Moscow Lomonosov University ===
In 1990, at the faculty of philosophy, a chair of the history and theory of world culture was created. Many prominent Soviet and Russian scholars like V. V. Ivanov, S. S. Averintsev, A. Y. Gurevich, M. L. Gasparov, G. S. Knabe, E. M. Miletinskiy, V. N. Romanov, T. V. Vasilyeva, N. V. Braginskaya, V. V. Bibikhin, Alexander Dobrokhotov have worked there.

Yuri Rozhdestvensky founded a school of Culturology at the Department of Language Studies of Moscow Lomonosov University. Rozhdestvensky's approach to the development of culture (accumulation and mutual influence of layers) can be compared to the approach used in media ecology.

== Other uses ==
The Oxford English Dictionary records usage of the word "culturology" with the meaning "[t]he science or study of culture or a culture" from 1920 onwards. American anthropologist Leslie White (1900–1975) popularised the term culturology among contemporary Anglophone social scientists. White defined culturology as a field of science dedicated to the study of culture and cultural systems. He notes that "culturology" was earlier known as "science of culture" as defined by English anthropologist Edward Burnett Tylor in his book 1872 Primitive Culture. White also notes that he introduced this term in 1939, and that for the first time the term appeared in English dictionaries in 1954. He also remarks that the corresponding German term, Kulturwissenschaft, was introduced by Wilhelm Ostwald in 1909.

Following White, philosopher of science Mario Bunge (1919–2020) defined culturology as the sociological, economic, political, and historical study of concrete cultural systems. "Synchronic culturology" is said to coincide with the anthropology, sociology, economics, and political ideology of cultures. By contrast, "diachronic culturology" is a component of history. According to Bunge, "scientific culturology" also differs from traditional cultural studies as the latter are often the work of idealist literary critics or pseudo-philosophers ignorant of the scientific method and incompetent in the study of social facts and concrete social systems.

Bunge's systemic and materialist approach to the study of culture has given birth to a variety of new fields of research in the social sciences. Fabrice Rivault, for instance, was the first scholar to formalize and propose international political culturology as a subfield of international relations in order to understand the global cultural system, as well as its numerous subsystems, and explain how cultural variables interact with politics and economics to impact world affairs. This scientific approach differs radically from culturalism, constructivism, and cultural postmodernism because it is based on logic, empiricism, systemism, and emergent materialism. International political culturology is being studied by scholars around the world.

== See also ==
- Cultural studies
- Ethnology
- Cultural anthropology
