= Natalia Pelevine =

British-Russian playwright, political activist and blogger

- Наталья Пелевина
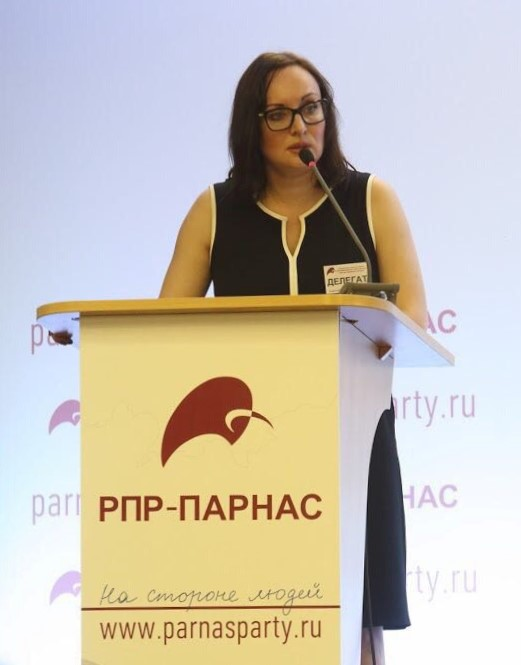

Personal details
- Born: 2 November 1976 (age 50) Moscow, Russian SFSR, Soviet Union
- Party: RPR-PARNAS
- Other political affiliations: 5th of December Party (2012–2015)

Natalia Pelevine (Russian: Наталья Пелевина/Пелевайн) (born on 2 November 1976) is a British-Russian playwright, political activist and blogger.

== Early years ==
Natalia Pelevine was born in Moscow in 1976. She moved to England as a child and attended a private school, Southbank International. She then received BA in Art History from a London University.

== Career ==
=== Theatre ===
In 2004, Pelevine set up a theatre production company, First Act Productions, which is based in London. She wrote In Your Hands, a play based on the events of the Moscow theater hostage crisis. It was first staged in October 2006 in North London at the New End Theatre. The Russian version of In Your Hands, directed by Skanderbek Tulparov, had its premiere at the Russian Dramatic Theatre in Makhachkala, Dagestan, in April 2008 and was banned after its opening night performance by the President of Dagestan, Mukhu Aliyev, who attended the performance. Reuters covered the event that was picked up by many major global media outlets.

Her play I Plead Guilty had its New York premiere in May 2011 at Gene Frankel theatre.

=== Political ===
Pelevine was one of the people behind the independent research into the Moscow theatre siege. A member of NGO Nord Ost, she remains in close contact with Nord Ost and Beslan victims and their families. Pelevine consulted on a number of documentary films about the Moscow theatre siege.

Pelevine has appeared as a political commentator on Al Jazeera, RTVi, PressTV, the BBC and other TV and radio channels. She was also involved with the Strategy-31 Abroad organization, which rallied for the article 31 of the Russian Constitution and for freedom and democracy in Russia, and opposes the current government. She was the organizer of the New York Strategy 31 pickets, on 31 August and 31 October 2010. She also organized an Oleg Kashin picket in November 2010 and a demonstration in support of Mikhail Khodorkovsky on 12 December 2010, during which she mentioned setting up a new movement. In early 2011, the Democratic Russia Committee was founded by Pelevine and supporters.

Formerly the head of the December 5 Party, Pelevine joined RPR-PARNAS in March 2015.

In 2012 Pelevine worked with Alexei Navalny on uncovering a major case of corruption that involved deputy prime-minister Igor Shuvalov.

In the summer of 2012 Pelevine co-founded the 5th of December Party.

In 2015 the Investigative Committee initiated prosecution of Pelevine in the Bolotnaya case. Although the case never went to court, Pelevine was under a travel ban for over three years, unable to leave Moscow.

On the 8th of September 2023 Russia’s Ministry of Justice declared Pelevine a foreign agent and she joined the list of other opposition politicians, artists and journalists.

In November 2023 Pelevine was elected as a Regional secretary of the Eastern Europe-Central Asia division of the World Liberty Congress.

A criminal investigation into Pelevine was opened by the Investigative Committee of Russia.

From winter 2024 to spring 2025 she was a fellow at the Institute of Politics of the University of Chicago.

In the Russian political “Puppet show” Natalia lends her voice to Russia’s number 3 in chain of command, Chairwoman of the Federation, Valentina Matviyenko.

Her documentary film “Borderline” about the war in Ukraine came out in February 2026.
