= List of Slavic pseudo-deities =

Slavic pseudo-deities (pseudo-gods, pseudo-goddesses) are Slavic deities described in popular and sometimes even scientific literature, whose historicity is not recognized by the vast majority of scholars, i.e. the deities in question are not deemed actually to have been objects of worship among pagan Slavs. The pseudo-deities of the Slavs, like those of other ethnic groups, were created as a result of mistakes (e.g., by understanding the given name as a theonym, unfamiliarity with the Slavic languages, misunderstanding of pagan ritual, or uncritical use of sources), as a result of the creation and falsification of Slavic Romantics, or even as a result of falsification for political motives. Much of them are originated from the works described as "pseudo-mythology" (kabinetnaya mifologiya, "office mythology", in Russian sources). The reason for the last two may be that, unlike, for example, those of Greek mythology, the sources on Slavic mythology are severely limited.

The first Slavic pseudo-deities began to appear as early as the Middle Ages, mainly in Latin Christian texts, as a result of mistakes. Slavic pseudo-deities on a large scale began to appear from the 18th and especially the 19th century. In 1768, a popular forgery of the time appeared, the so-called Prillwitz idols, depicting alleged Slavic deities decorated with alleged Slavic runes. Based on this forgery, many deities were created by Andreas Masch and later by Martin Arendt. In the 19th century, Czech philosopher Ignác Jan Hanuš was a popular fantasist, particularly known for his Die Wissenschaft des slavischen Mythus and Bájeslovný kalendář slovanský. Russian Aleksandr Famintsyn, who was rather uncritical in treating sources in his Bozhestva drevnikh slavyan ("Deities of the Ancient Slavs"), was also influential, as was Belarusian Pavel Shpilevsky with his work Belorusskiye narodnyye predaniya ("Belarusian Folk Legends"). In addition to the above-mentioned authors, every Slavic country had forgers of varying popularity. Contemporary falsification of the Slavic pantheon is continued by Czesław Białczyński in Poland (e.g. Stworze i zdusze, czyli starosłowiańskie boginki i demony. Leksykon, or Mitologia słowiańska: Księga tura), and by Alexander Asov in Russia (e.g. Kniga Kolyady).

== Popular pseudo-deities ==
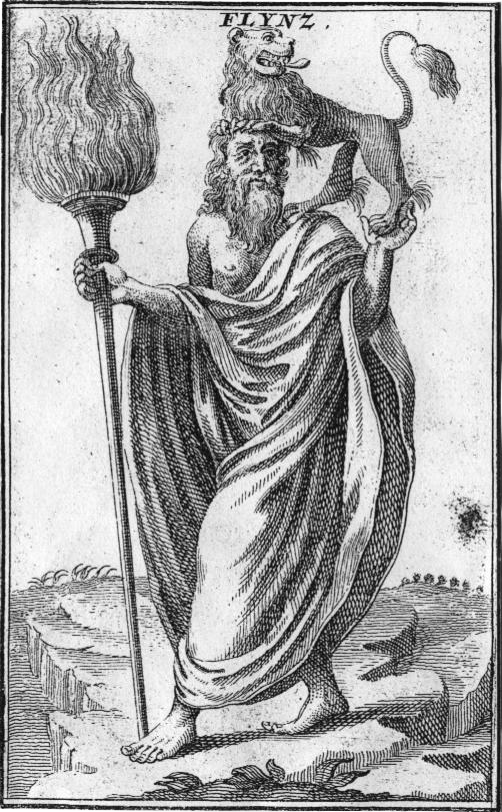
Flins

- Dzidzilela – according to Jan Długosz, the Polish equivalent of Venus, goddess of love, weddings and fertility.
- Chislobog – pseudo-deity of time and/or numbers invented in the 1900s, mentioned in the Book of Veles
- Vesna – alleged goddess of spring
- Jutrobog, Jutrnyboh – a supposed god worshipped in Lusatia. His name consists of the word jutry, jutrny "morning" and the word bog "god" and means "Morning God, Aurora". The town of Jüterbog is supposed to be named after him, although it is also possible that the last syllable is not bog but bok "side", and the name of the city can be translated as "side facing the morning (east)".
- Kyi – alleged Polish god of blacksmithing who appears in the sermons of Gniezno.
- Kupala – a deity created by medieval chroniclers based on the name of the Kupala Night holiday
- Koliada – personification of the New Year cycle and a figure in folk rituals mistakenly interpreted by Alexander Afanasyev as a goddess
- Lada – alleged Polish deity first mentioned by Jan Długosz as a god of war, equivalent to Mars, then by Maciej Miechowita recognized as the Polish equivalent of Leda.
- Lelya – the goddess of love, a word found in Russian folk songs
- Yesha – the chief god of Poles according to Jan Długosz, the equivalent of the Roman Jupiter; nowadays the authenticity of the god is rejected
- Dana – hypothetical water goddess proposed by Nikolay Kostomarov, rejected by modern scholarship
- Pogvizd, Pozvizd – a wind deity mentioned by Maciej Miechowita, and Pohvist, mentioned by Marcin Kromer as a god of inclement weather, in reality probably spirits or demons
- Flins – alleged deity of death worshipped by the remnants of the Sorbs, mentioned in Cronecken der Sassen (1492)
- Krodo – originally a pseudo-chief-deity of the Saxons in later centuries ascribed to the Slavs
- Trojan – a figure from South Slavic mythology borrowed by East Slavic writers and later recognized as a deity
- Chur – a 19th-century Russian pseudo-god of borders, equivalent to the Roman Terminus
- Uslad – a deity mistakenly created by Siegmund von Herberstein, then repeated by Stryjkowski, who took a fragment of Primary Chronicle, us zlat ("golden moustache" – about the statue of Perun), as theonym, and compared it to Cupid.

== West Slavs ==
=== Polabian Slavs ===
- Goderac (Latin: Gutdraccus) – Arnold of Lübeck, in Chronica Slavorum (his sequel to Helmold's Chronicle; V, 24), wrote that Bernon (died 1190 or 1191), bishop of Schwerin, destroyed the pagan cult, and in place of the deity Goderac ordered St. Godehard, bishop of Hildesheim, to be worshipped, taking advantage of the similarity of names. The deification was the result of a mistake – the name Goderac appears as early as 1171 in Henry the Lion, who granted the bishopric of Schwerin "the village of St. Godehard, which was once called Goderac," and the name itself is probably derived from a personal name, perhaps that of the village owner.
- Julius Caesar – According to Life of Saint Otto, Julius' spear was venerated in Wolin, which was also called Julin (Iulin) after Julius Caesar. According to the authors, it was supposed to be in a wooden column and slightly rusty. The Julius theme was later developed by Wincenty Kadlubek in his account of the battle of the Lechites led by Leszko III against Julius.
- Suentebueck – The 15th-century Passion of the Martyrs of Ebstorf speaks of Slavs who abandoned Christianity after the death of Charlemagne, who were said to have erected statues of Suentebueck, Vitelubbe, and Radegast that had been toppled earlier. Strzelczyk interprets the name as svęty byk "sacred bull", or less likely Svęty Vit "Saint Vitus" (Svetovit?).
- Vittelube – A deity also mentioned in the Passion. Probably recognized by the author as the name of a deity because of the occurrence of the local name Vietlübbe next to the local name Radegast, both in the district of Gadebusch.
- Svitibor, Zuttibor - a deity mentioned by Abraham Frentzel. Christian Knauthe translated the name as "Holy Forest".
- Puscetus - a deity mentioned by Abraham Frentzel. According to Christian Knauthe, the name sounded like the Slavic word bosowske "elderberry", "Deus Sambuceus like", and meant "one who lives under the Sambuceus tree".
- Ciza - goddess of maternal feeding according to Christian Knauthe. Her name was supposed to be derived from the Slavic word zyz (Polish cyc) "breast".

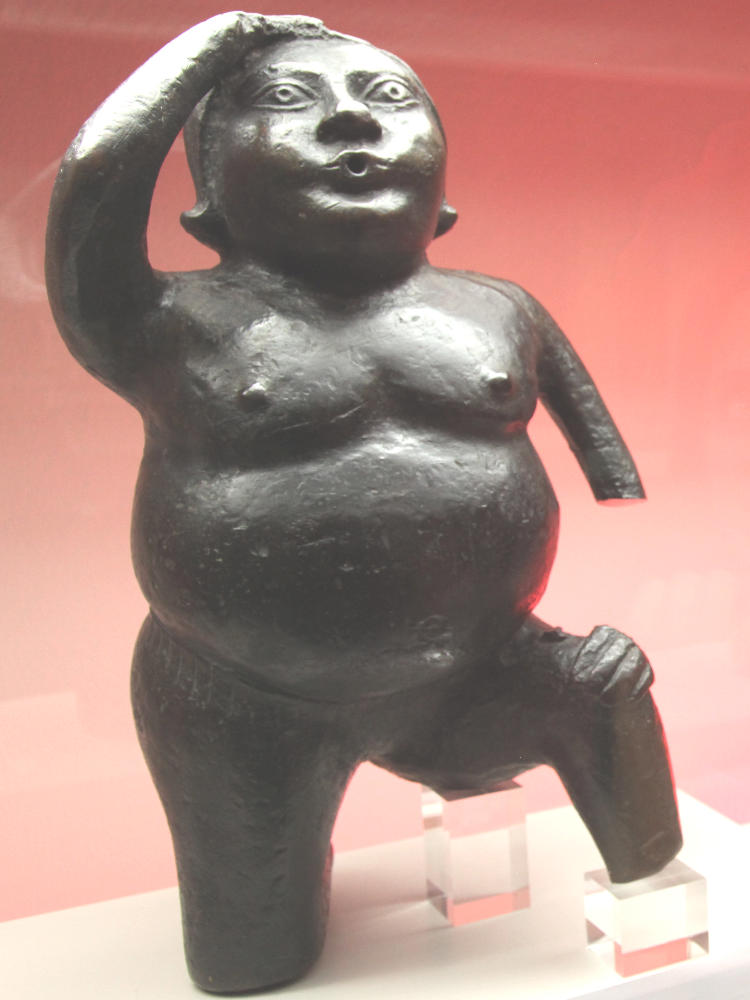
Püsterich

- Püsterich – In the middle of the 16th century, a bronze figure (57 cm.) of a pot-bellied man with one arm raised to his forehead, the rest of the limbs missing, was found at Castle in the Kyffhäuser mountains (Thuringia). There are two holes in the head, the head and torso is hollow inside. There were different interpretations of this figurine: Abraham Frentzel (1791) recognized Püsterich as a deity of Slavs from Thuringia linking him with the Polish word bystry "smart, bright, shrewd", others regarded him as a god of fire, or a god of both Slavs and Germans. The figurine was used as a toy, it acted as a kind of steam boiler, heated water poured out through holes in the head.

==== Prillwitz idols ====
Many of the deities were created by Andreas Gottlieb Masch (1771), a German theologian who studied the so-called Prillwitz idols, taking them to be authentic Slavic statues, but which are now recognized as 17th century forgeries. The drawings for his book were made by Daniel Woge, a German painter and illustrator. Masch's information was further repeated by Martin Friedrich Arendt (1820), a German botanist and antiquarian, and Bernhard Severin Ingemann (1824), a Danish writer.

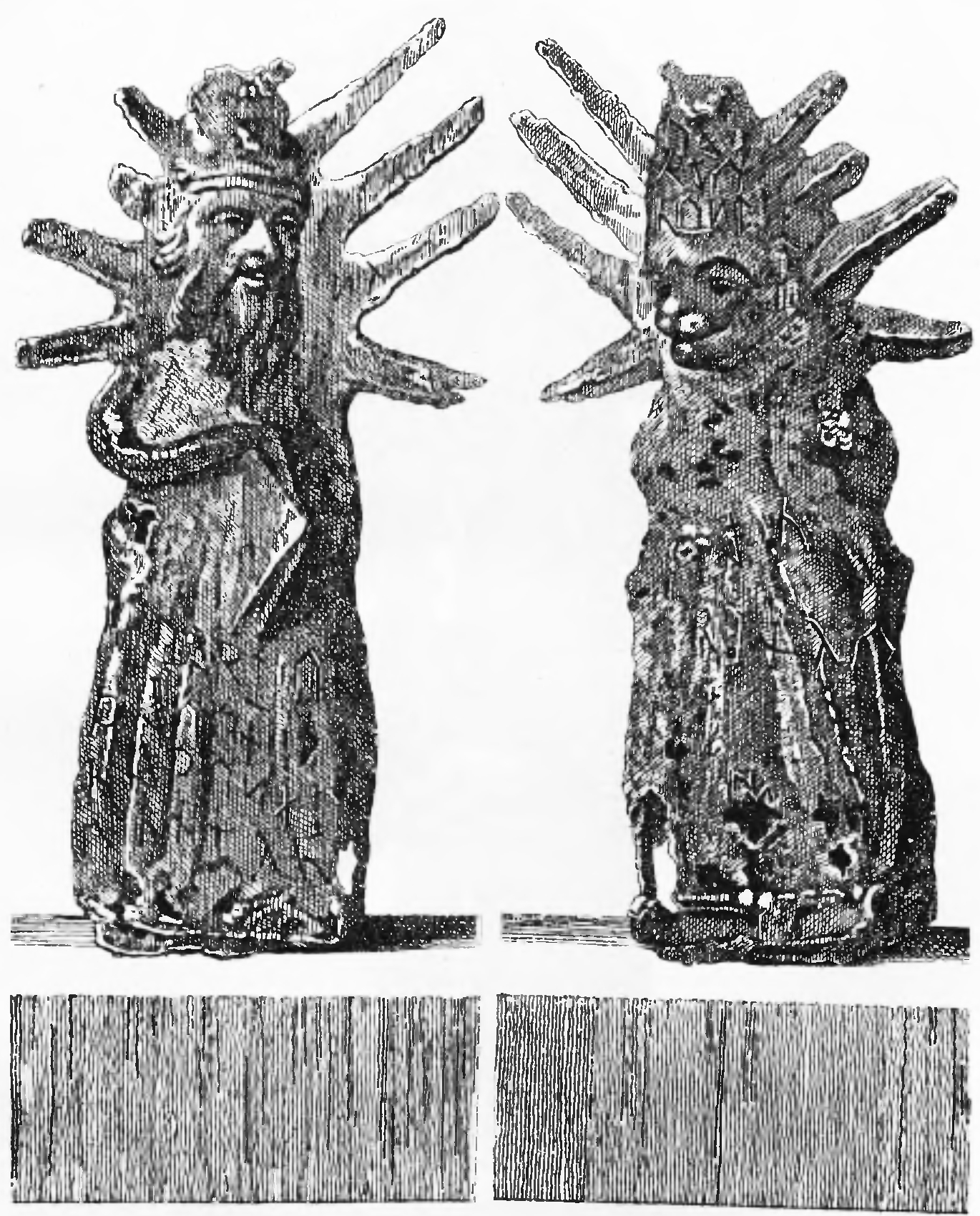
Percunust - one of the Prillwitz idols

Andreas Gottlieb Masch:

- Sieba
- Zibog, Siebog
- Nemisa
- Podba
- Percunust
- Schwaixtix
- Zislbog, Zislbocg
- Zirnitra, Zir
- Wodan
- Balduri
- Ipabog, Ipabocg
- Misizla
- Plusso
- Zois

Martin Friedrich Arendt:

- Tara(n)
- Othin
- Gestrab
- Raziva
- Tsibaz
- Hela
- Kricco
- Opora
- Karevit
- Hirovit
- Marovit
- Gilbog
- Juthrbog
- Urii
- Pya
- Mita
- Sicksa
- Berstuk
- Gudii

=== Czechs ===
Václav Hájek, a Czech chronicler who is accused of making up many events in his work, lists the deities in his Chronicle: Klimba, Krasatina, Krosina.

Hájek gained imitators after his death: Pavel Stránský, Jan Jiří Středovský, Juraj Papánek, who added the following deities by themselves: Chasoň, Ladoň, Zeloň, Živěna, Nočena, Krasopaní, Hladolet.

Priest Antonín Liška, one of the translators of Homer into Czech, also made up deities. He replaced Greek theonyms with similar Czech ones or just transferred them into Czech. He gave up to three versions of the same invented Czech name, writing them in brackets or footnotes:

- Bělobohyň (Leucothea)
- Boležal (Megapenthes)
- Bořivoj (Rhexenor)
- Buraš (Boreas)
- Děvany (nymph)
- Dáloboj (Telemachus)
- Hněvoň, Hněvoš, Hněvsa (Odysseus)
- Hrozivec, Protiva, Lidosvit (Styx)
- Chasoň, Jason, Slunce Hyperionovec (Helios)
- Jarec, Jaroš, Jařec (Ares)
- Kolohledi (Cyclopes)
- Lada, Pěnonorka (Aphrodite)
- Lichoplesy, Ochechule (Sirens)
- Meneslav (Menelaus)
- Milostenky (Charites)
- Nevid (Hades)
- Netřena (Athena)
- Peroun (Zeus)
- Pršenky (Pleiades)
- Pyripalič (Phlegethon)
- Radhost Zevs (Xenia)
- Skuhravec (Cocytus)
- Sudičky (Keres)
- Světloň ("sunny horse")
- Svrchovanec (Hyperion)
- Uměná, Umka (Muse)
- Ukryta (Calypso)
- Vodan, Vodeň, Vodín (Poseidon)
- Vodanky víly (Naiad)
- Vzteklice (Erinyes)
- Žalotok (Acheron)
- Žehlan (Hephaestus)
- Živena (Demeter)

Another forgery is the glosses added to Mater Verborum, a Czech-Latin dictionary, added by Václav Hanka, containing deities invented by him:

- Sytiwrat (Saturn)
- Hladolet (Saturn)
- Kirt (Saturn)
- Kralomocz (Jupiter)
- Smrtonoss (Mars)
- Chtytel (Venus)
- Dobropan (Mercury)
- Porvata (Persephone)
- Příje (Venus)
- Letnicě (Latona)
- Chliba (Salacia)
- Jasni (Isis)
- Svoba (Libertas)
- Zcuor or Ztuor (Osiris)
- Jarobud (Demetrius)
- Stracchus

Hanka also mentions gods from other sources, e.g. Belebog, Perun, Živa, Svetovit, Triglav, Veles, Lada, Devana, and Morana. In addition, he mentions many demons, including vesna.

== East Slavs ==
=== Book of Veles ===
The Book of Veles is a 20th century forgery that has gained particular popularity among Ukrainians. It lists, in addition to authentic gods, the following pseudo-gods:

- Vyšenʹ (Russian: Вышень)
- Lelja (Леля)
- Letnica (Летница)
- Kolendo (Колендо)
- Krʹšenʹ (Крьшень)
- Deržatelʹ (Держатель)
- Snvʹіj (Снвьій)
- Belojare (Белояре)
- Lado (Ладо)
- Kupalo (Купало)
- Senic (Сениц)
- Žitnec (Житнец)
- Veniŝč (Венищ)
- Zernic (Зерниц)
- Ovsenic (Овсениц)
- Prosicʹ (Просиць)
- Studecʹ (Студець)
- Ledic (Ледиц)
- Ljutecʹ (Лютець)
- Ptiščec (Птищец)
- Zverenc (Зверенц)
- Milic (Милиц)
- Dozdec (Доздец)
- Plodec (Плодец)
- Jagodnec (Ягоднец)
- Pščelic (Пщелиц)
- Rostic (Ростиц)
- Klenčič (Кленчич)
- Zzerenč (Ззеренч)
- Vetricʹ (Ветриць)
- Slomicʹ (Сломиць)
- Gribicʹ (Грибиць)
- Loviščʹ (Ловищь)
- Besedicʹ (Беседиць)
- Snezicʹ (Снезиць)
- Stranicʹ (Страниць)
- Sventicʹ (Свентиць)
- Radnicʹ (Радниць)
- Sveticʹ (Светиць)
- Korovicʹ (Коровиць)
- Krasicʹ (Красиць)
- Travicʹ (Травиць)
- Steblicʹ (Стеблиць)
- Rodicʹ (Родиць)
- Maslecʹ (Маслець)
- Živicʹ (Живиць)
- Vedicʹ (Ведиць)
- Listvicʹ (Листвиць)
- Kveticʹ (Кветиць)
- Vodišč (Водищ)
- Zvezdicʹ (Звездиць)
- Gromič (Громич)
- Semišč (Семищ)
- Lipecʹ (Липець)
- Rembicʹ (Рембиць)
- Brezičʹ (Брезичь)
- Zelenicʹ (Зелениць)
- Goricʹ (Гориць)
- Stradicʹ (Страдиць)
- Spasicʹ (Спасиць)
- Listeverzicʹ (Листеверзиць)
- Mʹjuslicʹ (Мьюслиць)
- Gosticʹ (Гостиць)
- Raticʹ (Ратиць)
- Stranicʹ (Страниць)
- Čurncʹ (Чурнць)
- Rodicʹ (Родиць)
- Ognebog Semerogelʹ (Огнебог Семерогель)
- Čislobog (Числобог)
- Kvasur (Квасур)

=== Others ===
- Uslad (Услад) – a deity mistakenly created by Siegmund von Herberstein, then repeated by Stryjkowski, who took a fragment of Primary Chronicle, us zlat ("golden moustache" – about the statue of Perun), as theonym, and compared it to Cupid.
- Zimtserla (Зимцерла) – goddess who first appears in the Russian translation (1722) of Kingdom of the Slavs, by the Croatian writer Mauro Orbini. The translator incorrectly transferred the theonym Semargl, written by Orbini as Simaergla, by writing the letter a as s and removing the letter g, probably due to euphony, and thus Simserla was created. The goddess is then mentioned by Mikhail Popov in his mythological dictionary; according to him, the corrupted name may have been derived from the words зима, zima ("winter"), and the verb стерть, stiertʹ ("to wipe off"), and would be a goddess of flowers, similar to Aurora. Zimtserla later appears in many Russian texts. She was erroneously believed to be the Aurora of the "Slavonians" and a "Queen of Flowers" or goddess of spring, akin to Roman Flora.

== South Slavs ==
One of the major forgeries from the South Slavs is the Serbian Песме и обичаи укупног народа српског (1869; "Songs and customs of the all Serbian peoples") by Miloš Milojević:

- Kupalo (Serbian Cyrillic: Купало)
- Koledo (Коледо)
- Koled (Кољед)
- Živboža (Живбожа)
- Živanija (Живанија)
- Svaroga (Сварога)
- Prprьruša (Прпрьруша)
- Pravid (Правид)
- Svevid (Свевид)
- Ljelj (Љељ)
- Ljelja (Љеља)
- Poljelj (Пољељ)
- Poljelja (Пољеља)
- Lada (Лада)
- Branjanj (Брањањ)
- Živ (Жив)
- Davor (Давор)
- Gostoslav (Гостослав)
- Vodan (Водан)
- Vodana (Водана)
- Moran (Моран)
- Morica (Морица)
- Pra Pra Bog (Пра Пра Бог)
- Preslav (Преслав)
- Višnji (Вишњи)
- Ježdraksin (Јеждраксин)
- Belgostić (Белгостић)
- Tug (Туг)
- Pravd (Правд)
- Crnobar (Црнобар)
- Vihor (Вихор)
- Kračun (Крачун)
- Praovil (Праовил)
- Belbožić (Белбожић)

The second important forgery is Veda Slovena (1874) by Stefan Verković:

- Kuledo (Bulgarian: Куледо)
- Kuleda (Коледа)
- Ognen (Огнен)
- Vishnu (Вишну)
- Vodin (Водин)
- Surva (Сурва)
- Rosna (Росна)
- Žijne (Жийне)
- Surica (Сурица)
- Iognica (Иогница)
- Masina (Масина)
- Rue (Руе)
- Vitna (Витна)
- Igne (Игне)
- Jognica (Йогница)
- Dʺžna (Дъжна)
- Dia (Диа)
- Jara (Яра)
- Druida (Друида)

In Croatia, a long list of authors contributed to romanticized interpretations, uncritical theories and unverifiable claims about Croatian pagan beliefs. This group includes the likes of Giorgio Sisgoreo, Marin Držić, Matija Petar Katančić, Pavao Ritter Vitezović, Natko Nodilo, Nikola Sučić and Franjo Ledić, among others. These authors' works are now sources of many pseudo-deities and fabricated systems in what is today popularly considered Croatian folklore, including Črt, Sarmand, Velja and an entire systematically presented "Croatian pantheon" containing deities such as Bjelobog, Danica, Domovoj, Slava, Vesna, Voloska, Zora and Žibog.

== See also ==
- Fakelore
- Pseudo-mythology
- Outline of Slavic history and culture
- List of Slavic studies journals

== Bibliography ==
- Masch, Andreas Gottlieb (1771). Woge, Daniel (ed.). Die gottesdienstlichen Alterthümer der Obotriten, aus dem Tempel zu Rhetra, am Tollenzer-See. Neustrelitz: Rellstab.
- Ingemann, Bernhard Severin (1824). Grundtræk til en nord-slavisk og vendisk Gudelære: Indbydelsesskrift til den offentlige Examen ved Soröe Academies Skole. Trykt hos Jens Hostrup Schultz.
- Arendt, Martin Friedrich (1820). Großherzoglich-Strelitzisches Georgium Nord-Slavischer Gottheiten und ihres Dienstes. Minden: Bösendahl.
- Beyer, Wilhelm Gottlieb (1872). "Die Hauptgottheiten der westwendischen Völkerschaften". Verein für Mecklenburgische Geschichte und Altertumskunde: Jahrbücher des Vereins für Mecklenburgische Geschichte und Altertumskunde. 37: 115–171.
- Strzelczyk, Jerzy (1998). Mity, podania i wierzenia dawnych Słowian. Poznań: Dom Wydawniczy Rebis. ISBN 83-7120-688-7.
- Dudko, Dmitrij Michajłowicz (2002). Велесова книга. Славянские Веды. Антология мудрости. Moscow: ЭКСМО-Пресс. ISBN 5-04-009912-6.
- Klejn, Leo (2004). "«Веды славян» и «Велесова книга»". Воскрешение Перуна. К реконструкции восточнославянского язычества (in Russian). Eurazja. ISBN 5-8071-0153-7.
- Kalandra, Záviš (2002). České pohanství I (in Czech) (2 ed.). Praga: Academia.edu. ISBN 80-86019-82-9.
- Bartocha, Josef (1881). "O starších překladech velebásní Homerových u nás. (1801–1843)". Listy filologické a paedagogické (in Czech). 8 (3/4): 242–301. ISSN 1801-1934. JSTOR 23429137.
- Brückner, Aleksander (1985). Mitologia słowiańska (in Polish). Warszawa: Państwowe Wydawnictwo Naukowe. ISBN 8301062452.
- Szyjewski, Andrzej (2003). Religia Słowian (in Polish). Kraków: Wydawnictwo WAM. ISBN 83-7318-205-5.
- Gieysztor, Aleksander (2006). Mitologia Słowian (in Polish). Warszawa: Wydawnictwa Uniwersytetu Warszawskiego. ISBN 978-83-235-0234-0.
- Enders, Julius (1993). "Speciální problémy Mater verborum". Jazykovědný rozbor Rukopisu Královédvorského, Zelenohorského a dalších staročeských textů s nimi spojovaných (in Czech). Neklan. ISBN 8090088465.
- Moroz-Grzelak, Lidia (2004). "Między nieświadomością a mistyfikacją. „Veda Slovena" – fałszerstwo literackie Słowiańszczyzny południowej". In Malej, Izabella; Tarajło-Lipowska, Zofia (eds.). Wielkie tematy kultury w literaturach słowiańskich (in Polish). Vol. 5. Wrocław: Wydawnictwo Uniwersytetu Wrocławskiego. pp. 91–98.
- Milojević, Miloš (1869). Песме и обичаи укупног народа српског: Обредне песме. Прва књига (in Serbian). Belgrad.
- Montalba, Anthony Reubens (1850). Fairy Tales From All Nations. New York: Harper.
- Кутарев, Олег Владиславович (2016). "История мистификаций и домыслов в области славянского пантеона (до середины XIX в.) [THE HISTORY OF MYSTIFICATIONS IN SLAVIC PAGAN PANTHEON (UNTIL THE MIDDLE OF XIX CENTURY)]". // Язычество в современной России: опыт междисциплинарного исследования: монография / под ред. Р.В. Шиженского. Нижний Новгород: Мининский университет, 2016. С. 133–160. (in Russian). PDF https://vk.com/doc-120497_442906131
- Кутарев, Олег Владиславович (2017). "Святыни полабских славян в Германии" (in Russian). dajbojic.ru.
- Kolankiewicz, Leszek (1999). Dziady. Teatr święta zmarłych [Dziady. Theater of the Day of the Dead] (in Polish). Gdańsk: Słowo/Obraz Terytoria. ISBN 8387316393.
- Witkowski, Teodolius (1970). "Mythologisch motivierte altpolabische Ortsnamen". Zeitschrift für Slawistik (in German). 15 (1). Berlin: Akademie Verlag: 368–385. doi:10.1524/slaw.1970.15.1.368.
