= Chislobog =

Slavic pseudo deity of time

- Time
- Other names: Числобог
- Venerated in: Ynglism

Chislobog (Cyrillic: Числобог) is a slavic pseudo-deity of time invented in the 20th century. worshipped prominently in Ynglism, a new religious movement which claims to be reviving ancient slavic religion.

Allegedly, his name, spelled as 'ченслобг' ("chenslobg"), is mentioned in the Book of Veles, normally seen as a literary forgery.

He is also identified with Zislbocg/Zislbog from Prillwitz idols, an 18th-century archaeological forgery. However, Andreas Gottlieb Masch, who described the idols, wrote that while the previous figurine (in his list) is identified with the Sun, the one beside him must be an image of the Moon, while noticing that he was not familiar with the word.
