= Voloska =

Croatian and Slavic pseudo-deity

- Goddess of the home and the hearth
- Other names: Vlasta

Genealogy
- Spouse: Veles

Voloska, sometimes dubbed Vlasta, is a Croatian and Slavic hearth pseudo-deity that has not been attested in historical sources on Slavic paganism. The first known published source that attests to Voloska is the 1943 book Hrvatska narodna mitologija ("Croatian National Mythology") by psychiatrist Nikola Sučić, which has been criticized by Croatian ethnologists as "incorrectly assessing" pagan myths and as unreliable due to a lack of sources.

According to Sučić, Voloska was the spouse of Veles and the protector of agricultural workers, symbolized by a cow and a swallow. He claims that all Slavic homes featured an alcove ("mirište") where a small flame would be lit in Voloska's honor. This alcove would allegedly also include statuettes of Voloska made from wood, wax or amber.

== In popular culture ==
After the publishing of Sučić's book, Voloska was mentioned in the poems of Vladimir Nazor ("Miti i legende", 1948) and Boro Pavlović ("Slavenska lipa", 1960).

Commonly cited publicist and movie director Franjo Ledić, whose interpretation of Slavic mythology was described as "romanticized" by ethnologist Tea Škokić and "uncritical" by Lidija Bajuk, wrote a chapter on Voloska based on the work of Sučić and the previously mentioned poems.

== Bibliography ==
- Ledić, Franjo (1969). Mitologija Slavena: tragom kultova i vjerovanja starih Slavena. Vol. 1. Zagreb.
- Bajuk, Lidija (2018). "Odjeci slavenskoga mita u nematerijalnoj kulturi Međimurja" [Echoes of Slavic mythology in the immaterial culture of Međimurje] (PDF).
