= Ledić =

Ledić may refer to:

- Ante Ledić (born 1939), Croatian businessman, politician and long jumper
- Dubravko Ledić (born 1950), Bosnian footballer
- Franjo Ledić (1892–1981), Croatian and Yugoslav film director, producer and screenwriter
