= Khors =

Slavic god

- Member of Vladimir's pantheon
- Texts: Primary Chronicle; The Tale of Igor's Campaign; The Virgin Mary’s Journey through the Torments; Sermon by Saint Gregory, Found in the Comments...; Sermon by the Holy Father Saint John Chrysostom...; Sermon by One Who Loves Christ...; Sermon and Revelation by the Holy Apostles

Khors (Note: Russian: Хорс [xors], Old East Slavic: Хърсъ, Хорсъ, romanized: Xǔrsǔ, Xorsǔ) is a Slavic god of uncertain functions mentioned since the 12th century. Generally interpreted as a sun god, sometimes as a moon god. The meaning of the theonym is also unknown: most often his name has been combined with the Iranian word for sun, such as the Persian xoršid, or the Ossetian xor, but modern linguists strongly criticize such an etymology, and other native etymologies are proposed instead.

== Sources ==
Khors is the most frequently mentioned Slavic god, after Perun. He first appears in the Primary Chronicle along with other gods to whom Vladimir the Great erected statues:

And Vladimir began to reign alone in Kiev. And he placed idols on the hill outside the palace: a Perun in wood with a silver head and a gold moustache, and Khors, Dazhdbog and Stribog and Simargl and Mokosh. And they offered sacrifices and called them gods, and they took their sons and daughters to them and sacrificed them to the devils. And they profaned the earth with their sacrifices, and Rus’ and that hill were profaned by blood. But God the merciful, who does not wish the death of sinners, on that hill stands today the church of Saint Vasilij, as we will relate later.

Original text
И нача къняжити Володимиръ въ Кыевѣ единъ, и постави кумиры на хълму, вънѣ двора теремьнаго: Перуна древяна, а главу его сьребряну, а усъ златъ, и Хърса, Дажьбога и Стрибога и Сѣмарьгла и Мокошь. И жьряху имъ, наричюще я богы, и привожаху сыны своя и дъщери, и жьряху бѣсомъ. И осквьрняху землю требами своими; и осквьрни ся кръвьми земля Русьская и хълмъ тъ. Нъ преблагыи Богъ не хотя съмьрти грѣшьникомъ, на томь хълмѣ нынѣ цьркы есть святаго Василия, якоже послѣди съкажемъ.

— Primary Chronicle

The second source mentioning the god is The Tale of Igor's Campaign: "Prince Vseslav was a judge for his subjects, he distributed cities among princes, but by night he ran like a wolf, from Kiev he ran to Tmutarakan, before the cock crowed, as a wolf he ran along the road of the great Khors."

God is also mentioned in the apocryphal work Sermon and Apocalypse of the Holy Apostles, which mentions Perun and Khors as old men, and Khors is credited with real life in Cyprus. Khors also appears in the apocryphal text Conversation of the Three Saints, in which St. Basil, St. Gregory the Theologian, and St. John Chrysostom converse. St. John asks: "What was thunder made from?", St. Basil replies: "There are two angels of thunder. For this, the ancient Greek Perun, Khors is Jewish. And there are two angels of lightning". This text combines Slavic, Christian, and Bogomil traditions. He also occurs in other letopis-dependent sources.

=== In proper nouns ===
Mikhail Vasil'yev cited a number of hydronyms from the Novgorod-Severian region (e.g., Khorsovo swamp, Khorsov reservoir) from the 16th-18th centuries, toponyms in Volhynia from the 10th-12th centuries, or Hŭrsovo in Bulgaria, to the right of the Danube. Andrey Beskov notes that in Borova region (Ukraine), not far from the village of Horokhovatka, there was the village of Horsivka, which is now under the Oskol reservoir. Significantly, among the inhabitants of this village were bearers of the surname Khors.

God was also to be preserved in the Old Serbian name Хьрсь, Old Bulgarian Хръсъ, Serbian Хрс, Hrs, Хрсовик, Hrsovik, Old East Slavic Хорсъ in analogy to the Polish name Dadźbóg, from the god Dazhbog. It is also possible that he was preserved in the Old Czech name Chorúš. It has been proposed that the Serbian names should be regarded as alterations of the Greek name Χρυσης, Khrisis, or Χρυσος, Khrisos, but according to Aleksander Brückner this is unwarranted: these names are not Christian names, so there was no reason for the Serbs to adopt them, and Χρυσ- is spelled simply as khris-.

== Etymology ==
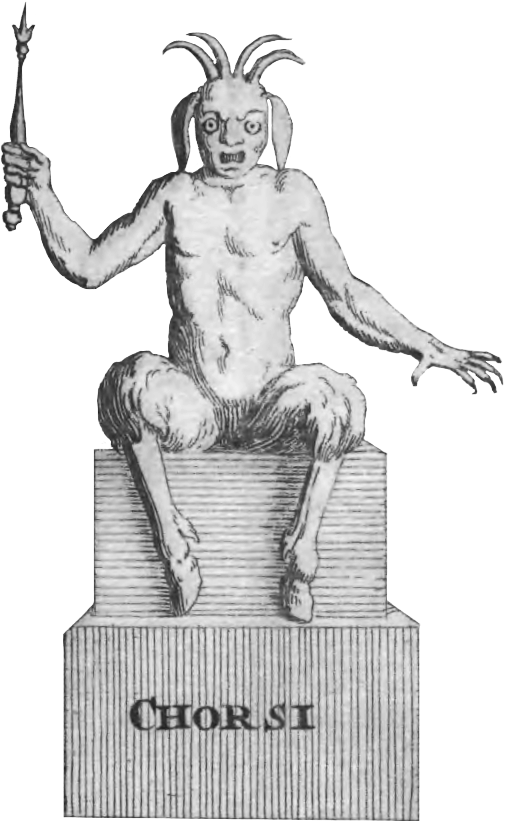
Christian, propaganda image of Khors, Georg A. Schleusing, La Religion ancienne et moderne des Moscovites, 1698.

In Old Russian sources, this theonym is noted as Xърсъ, Xŭrsŭ, Хорсъ, Xorsŭ, Хъросъ, Xŭrosŭ, and in modern Russian literature it is written as Khors (Russian: Хорс), similarly spelled by Maciej Stryjkowski - Khorsum (Polish: Chorsum, modern Chors). In English, depending on the transliteration system, the name is written as Khors, Hors, or Xors.

=== Iranian etymology ===
Currently, the most popular view regarding the etymology of the theonym Khors is Iranian, and this etymology has been proposed since the 19th century. The Russian historian Pёtr Butkov, who called Khors "the Slavic Apollo", was one of the first to connect his name with the Persian خورشید, xuršit and the Ossetian xur, xor "sun," and with the Ossetian xorošŭ, хоrsŭ, xorsu meaning "good". Iranian xvar "halo", Indian hāra, hāras "fire" or Persian xoršid "sun", Xuršid "sun-god" are also proposed. The Iranian word was also supposed to be the root word for Krones, the sky god in the Voguls and Ostyaks, and for the word kvar "sky", "air" in the Votyak language.

Vladimir Toporov believed that the name Khors was brought to Kyiv, along with the solar cult, by soldiers from Khwarazm, who were supposedly stationed there during the reign of Vladimir the Great, but this theory has been heavily criticized. Mikhail Vasil'yev stated that the name could not have been borrowed from Middle Persian, but from Sarmatian-Alan peoples in the first millennium BC (so-called Iranian inversion).

Besides the Iranian etymology, there were other theories. For example, an early loan from Ossetian xorz "good" was proposed, which would also explain the Russian word хороший, khoroshiy "good," which was originally supposed to mean "of Khors, belonging to Khors", but this possibility was rejected by Vasmer. Toporov, who also rejected borrowing from Ossetian, wrote:

The only Russian word which has really been connected by researchers with the name of Khors is – khoroshiy. This link now appears unquestionable [...]. Unquestionable is also the direction of the word formation: Khors → khoroshiy. It is only the concrete Iranian source of the name Hors that raises doubts.

==== Criticism ====
Borrowing from Iranian languages has been accepted by religious scholars without much complaint, but linguists, such as Max Vasmer, point out phonetic problems. Iranian hva- does not explain the Slavic short vowel ъ (ŭ), and š could not in Slavic languages remain as s, but according to the ruki rule should remain either as х (h) or as š (sh) in case the word was borrowed after the rule completion.

Iranian etymology also has historical problems. Khors could not have been borrowed during the reign of Vladimir the Great because by that time Persia had already converted to Islam, and the word Xoršid in Persian meant only "sun" and had no religious connotations. The name cannot be derived from the Avestan Hvar (because of the final -s), or hvarə хšаētəm: the expression was shortened to xwaršēδ/xoršid in Middle Persian during the Sassanid dynasty, at which time sun worship was transferred to the god Mitra. Additionally, at an early stage, iconoclasm prevailed in Persia and idols of Iranian gods were replaced with sacred fires. It is unclear, then, how the Eastern Slavs would have borrowed the word xwaršēδ/xoršid from Persia in such a short time, made a radical phonetic change, and placed Khors so high in the pantheon. Vasil'yev tried to solve this problem by suggesting the existence of a hypothetical Sarmatian-Alan word *xors/*xūrs "King-Sun" obtained through a complex chain of assumptions, but here too the phonetic problems mentioned earlier arise.

A comprehensive critique of Iranian theory was also made by Andrey Beskov.

=== Slavic etymologies ===
==== From Proto-Indo-European *kr̥ḱós ====
Aleksander Brückner (1918) also proposed a Slavic origin of the theonym. According to him, Chъrsъ in Polish would sound like chars and he finds this word in Polish dated phrases przecharsła koza or wycharsł mężczyzna meaning "emaciated, haggard, pinched, drawn" creature, or in Czech words krsati, krsnouti "to emaciate, haggard", krsek "dwarf", zakrsly, krs "dwarf shrub" with typical interchange of ch and k – the Polish word with preserved original k is karślak "knotty tree", or toponymes Karsy. The Proto-Slavic form of these words is reconstructed as the adjective *kъrsъ "declined, skinny, dwarf", the verb *kъrsati "to decrease, decline", *krsnąti "to lose weight" from PIE. *kr̥ḱós "skinny" (PIE ḱ → PS s). This interpretation was supported by Michał Łuczyński (2020). According to him, the Proto-Slavic form of theonym, *Xъrsъ, from the earlier *Kъrsъ, is formally identical with the surnames: Old Serbian Хьрсь and Old Bulgarian Xrъсъ, as well as the toponyms: Old Polish *Kars and *Chars, Serbian Hrs and Old Russian Хорсъ and others, and is derived from the adjective *kъrsъ "skinny". This reconstruction is etymologically correct, and semantically consistent with the lunar interpretation – moon as "skinny", which may have been related to lunar cycles.

==== From Proto-Indo-European *kʷr̥s- ====
According to the Slovak linguist Martin Pukanec (2013), the theonym Khors does not have a Proto-Slavic genesis. He points here to a Slavic TarT/TorT (T = any consonant) switch that occurred around 800. Proto-Slavic TorT in East Slavic languages passed into ToroT, so Proto-Slavic *Xorsъ should pass into East Slavic *Xorosъ, and such a notation is not confirmed by the sources. According to him, there is also no reliable attestation of this theonym in West and South Slavic languages. In that case, according to Pukanec, the theonym was borrowed from Persian xuršēt "shining sun", but he does not address the criticism of such etymology by other linguists presented earlier.

He also points to another possibility. Proto-Slavic TorT passed into Church Slavonic as TъrT and TrъT, which would explain both notations *Xorsъ and *Xъrsъ and recognizes the *Xъrsъ notation as primary. As the PS *x may derive from PIE *k or *g, when searching for the PIE etymology of the word, attention must be paid primarily to the rounded phones *kʷ, *gʷ, and *gʷʰ; the Proto-Indo-European stem can thus be reconstructed as *kʷr̥s- or *gʷr̥s- or *gʷʰr̥s-. Of the aforementioned stems, only one, *kʷr̥s-, is found in Julius Pokorny's Indogermanisches etymologisches Wörterbuch, who reconstructed this stem using Greek πρῖνος, prînos "oak (holly)", Gaulish prenne "large tree", Old High German horst, hurst "bush, thicket" or Slovene hrást "oak", which, like the theonym in question, contain a vowel between -r- and -s-. Such a reconstruction would indicate functions similar to those of Perun, the god of storms and oaks.

== Interpretations ==
=== Khors-Dazhbog – Sun god ===
Scholars who assume an Iranian etymology most often attribute the solar features to Khors. The main argument is the root of the theonym meaning "sun" in the first place, regardless of which exact word that root was. Moreover, according to The Tale of Igor's Campaign, Prince Vseslav, who "came to Tmutarakani before the cocks" and "ran along the road of the great Khors", traveled from west to east and thus reached the castle before the cocks crowed, and in this way "overtook" the Sun.

It has also been pointed out in the text of the Primary Chronicle where, when listing the statues of the gods, only between Khors and Dazhbog, the sun god, no conjunction "and" is used (unlike the rest of the gods), and this, according to many scholars, would suggest that Khors is another name of Dadzbog, his hypostasis, or that they are related in some other way. Such a view was supported e.g. by Henryk Łowmiański, according to whom Dazhbog was an explanation of Khors. He pointed out, however, that he was not sure if conjunction wasn't there. Brückner argued against this view, claiming that the lack of conjunctions was irrelevant, and he considered the association of Dazhbog with Khors to be unjustified. An analysis of the spelling of Old East Slavic sources confirms Brückner's view: the lack of a conjunction often occurs in the enumeration of choronyms, ethnonyms, hydronyms, anthroponyms, and theonyms, e.g.: copy of Novgorod First Chronicle: "... и стриба сенмарекла мокошь", Sermon and Revelation by the Holy Apostles: "пероуна и хорса дыя и трояна", Sermon by Saint Gregory, found in the comments: "молятся (...) нероуноу. хорсу мокоши".

=== Moon god ===
Some scholars, who also assume an Iranian etymology, believe that Chors was a lunar god, and that the meaning of his name refers not to the rays of the sun, but to the rays of the moon.

It is pointed out here that Vseslav was called a "wolf" and werewolfism is associated with the moon, while the prince's journey itself takes place at night when the sun is absent from the sky, thus he could not cut the path of the sun but the moon. Additionally, it is also pointed out that Tmutarakan is not located from Kyiv to the east, but to the southeast. A probable misunderstanding of the phrase "to the hens" is also pointed out. In Old East Slavic this phrase meant "until late; at night", "until dawn, before dawn", and Russian dial. phrase "до вторых кочетов" meant "until late; after midnight' (literally: "to the other roosters"). As phrases beginning with "до" meant night and morning phrases starting with "со" (cf. со вторыми кочетами), it can be concluded that Vseslav arrived in the city at night, not in the morning. Łuczynski also points out that the epithet "great" (OES великому, velikomu) used in relation to Khors in The Tale, which is usually taken as an argument for the solar interpretation, can be understood differently: in Slavic folklore the epithet "great" is often used in relation to the moon, e.g. the Polish wielki księżyc, Serbo-Croatian and Slovenian velik mesec, and he further compares the Old Russian phrase to the Old Norse kenning mána vegr "sky", literally "the way of the moon".

The interpretation of the name Khors as "emaciated" was supported by linguist Wanda Budziszewska. She reports that the waning moon was called "puny, frail" among the Slavs: Polish dial. (Podhale and the Kraków area) wietek, wiotek, Old Czech vetech, Belarusian v́òtak and Russian vétoch. In Old Polish, the word wiotchy meant "frail because of wear, use, old age" (PS *vetъxъ).

== Alleged idol ==
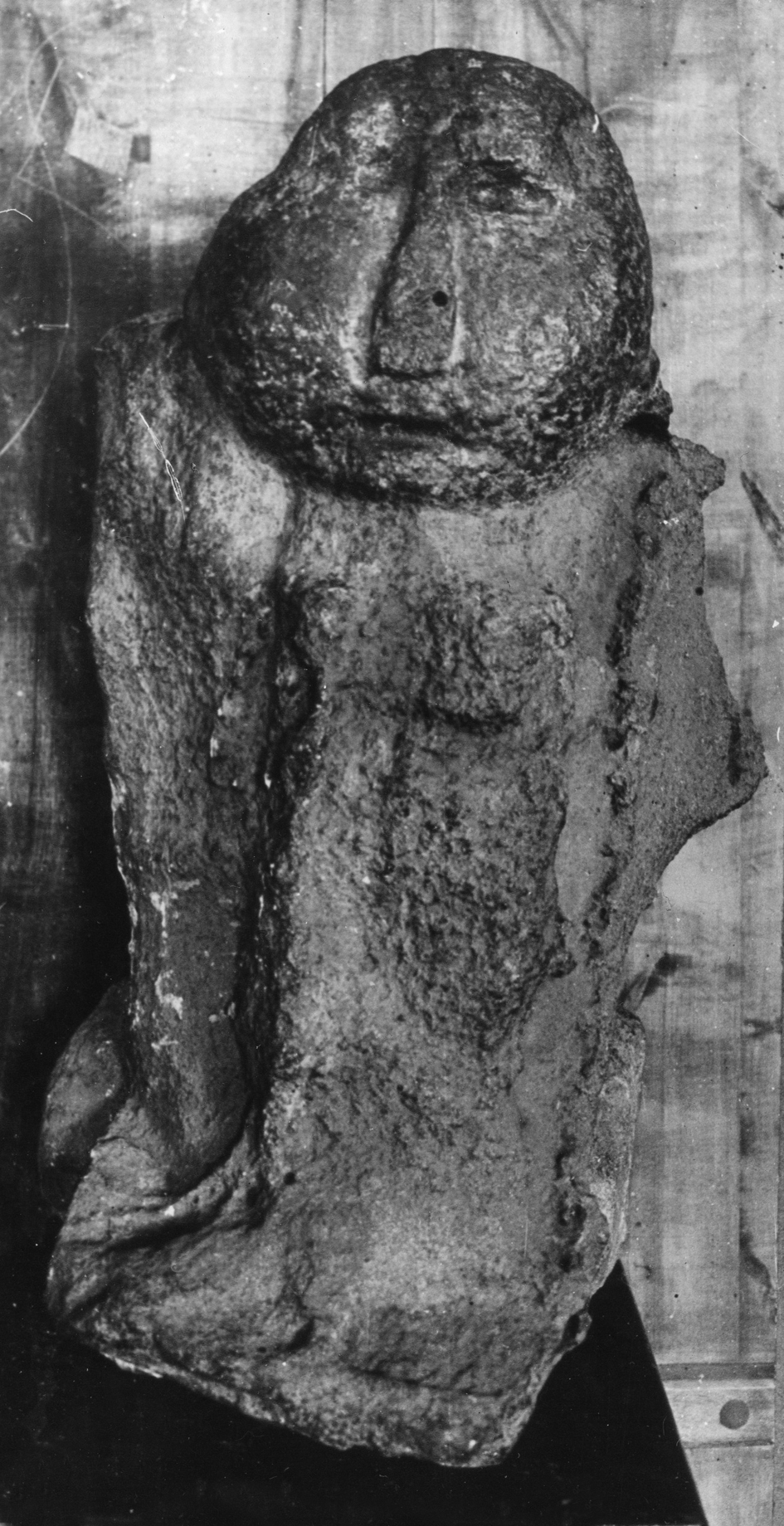
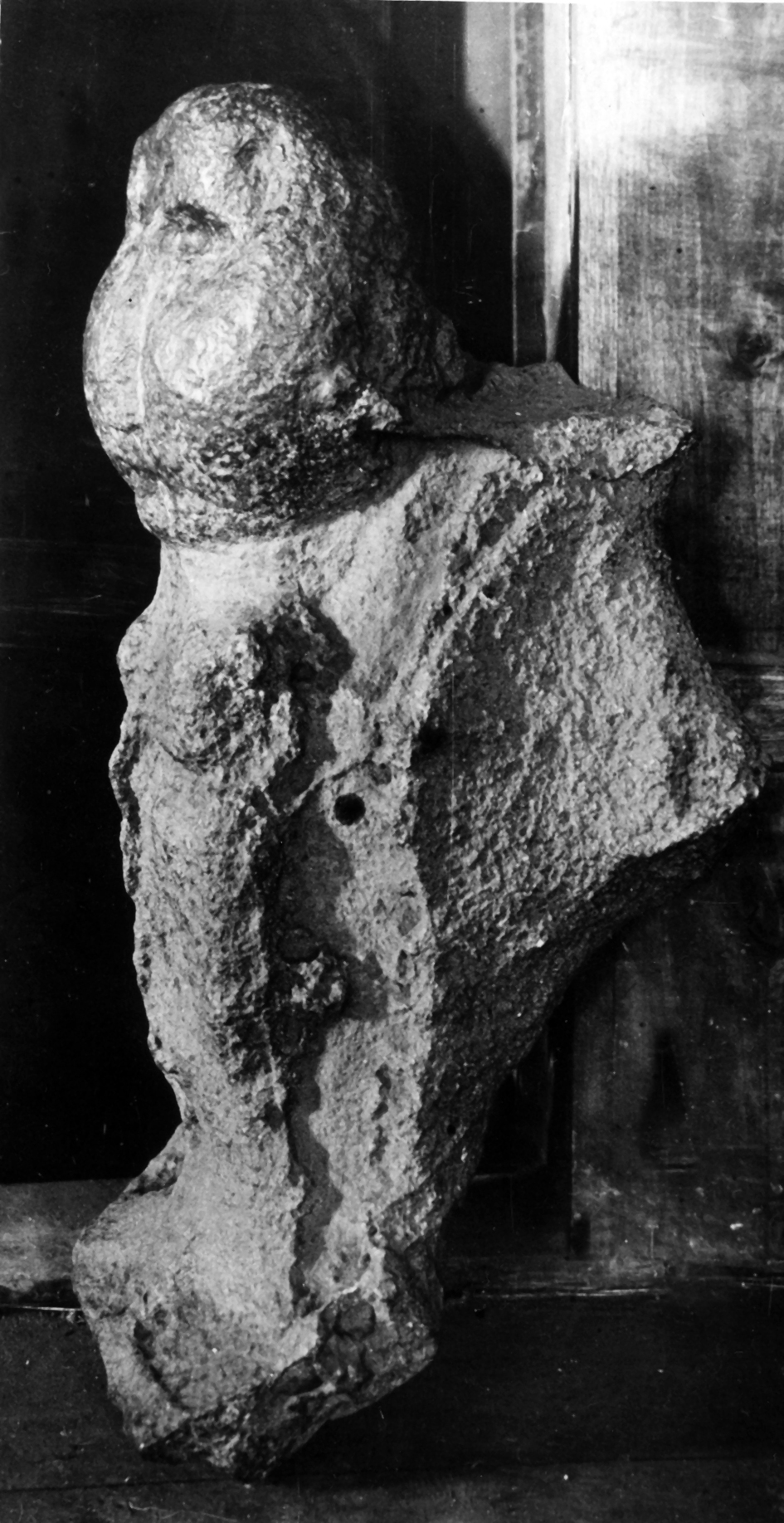
Stone baba found near Pskov. Some think that it matches Vunderer's description of Uslad, and according to Kirpichnikov it is Khors or Dazhbog.

The German traveler Johann David Wunderer, who traveled in Russia from 1589 to 1590 and described Pskov in his memoir, mentioned the statues of Khors and Uslad that were supposed to be located near Pskov:

In front of the town we saw two idols, set up in olden times by the priests who worshipped them, namely, Usad, whose stone statue holds a cross in his hand, (and) Khors, who stands on a serpent, with a sword in one hand and a thunderbolt (literally, a ray of fire - A.K.) in the other.

In his diary, Wunderer described Pskov freshly, although when he was editing the manuscript, he added elements that are borrowed from other sources, and they add more detailed information that, however, are easily identifiable. Wunderer could not have known the names of the gods depicted on the stone primarily because the Uslad he mentions is in fact a pseudodeity, his name came about as a result of a distortion of a passage in Primary Chronicle in which a statue of Perun and other Slavic pagan idols erected by Vladimir of Kiev are described, Sigismund von Herberstein recognized the words golden moustache (us zlat) in the description of Perun as an independent name Uslad, (Note: Primary Chronicle: И нача къняжити Володимеръ въ Кыевѣ единъ, и постави кумиры на хълмѣ вънѣ двора теремьнаго: Перуна древяна, а главу его сьребряну, а усъ златъ, и Хърса Дажьбога и Стрибога и Сѣмарьгла и Мокошь. Herberstein: Volodimerus multa idola Kioviae institut: primus idolum Perun dictum capite argento, caetere lignea errant; alia, Uslad, Corsa, Dasva, Striba, Simaergla, Macosch vocabitur) and he never existed in the Russian pantheon. Many historians considered the mentioned passage unreliable.

Wunderer realized that a field camp of Stephen Báthory, who besieged Pskov in 1581-1582, had once been located near the statues, and this information led to the location of the statues he described. The camp was located south of Pskov and lay on both sides of the Promiezhitsa stream, which separated the flat terrain around the city from the wooded hills and mountains that stretched all the way to the Cheremcha river, and the statues must have been located near it. The existence of the idol was unexpectedly confirmed when, during excavations in 1897, the so-called stone baba (a conventional name for stone statues depicting people in Eastern Europe) was found between Promiezhitsa and the factory. The statue was probably not found in its original place, but that place must have been nearby anyway. During World War II, the statue, which was in the Pskov Museum, was lost, but photographs from 1928-1929 have survived. The idol was about 100 cm. long, and had a cross on its chest, which was made at the same time as the rest of the sculpture, but the idol was deliberately damaged, and only the head is preserved in good condition.

According to Russian archaeologist Anatoliy Kirpichnikov the figure is related to the Slavic paganism. The location of the statue and the sign of the cross coincide exactly with Wunderer's description. The cross, which is an ancient symbol of the sun, is supposed to testify to the relationship of the god in the statue with the sun, and the statue itself is supposed to represent Khors or Dazhbog. Some researchers have suggested that the statue belongs to Christian culture. The statue is dated to the 8th to 10th century.

== Bibliography ==
- Alvarez-Pedroza, Juan Antonio (2021). Sources of Slavic Pre-Christian Religion. Leiden: Koninklijke Brill. ISBN 978-90-04-44138-5.
- Beskov, Andrey Anatolyevich (2010). Восточнославянское язычество: Религиоведческий анализ (in Russian). Saarbrücken: LAMBERT Academic Publishing. ISBN 978-3843300230.
- Borissoff, Constantine Leo (2014). "Non-Iranian origin of the Eastern-Slavonic god Xŭrsŭ/Xors". Studia Mythologica Slavica. 17: 9–36. doi:10.3986/sms.v17i0.1491. ISSN 1581-128X.
- Brückner, Aleksander (1985). Mitologia słowiańska i polska (in Polish). Warsaw: Państwowe Wydawnictwo Naukowe. ISBN 83-01-06245-2.
- Budziszewska, Wanda (1999). "Dwie kultowe nazwy księżyca u Słowian". In Bartmiński, Jerzy (ed.). Językowy obraz świata (in Polish). Vol. 12. Lublin: Wydawnictwo Uniwersytetu Marii Curie-Skłodowskiej.
- Gieysztor, Aleksander (2006). Mitologia Słowian (in Polish). Warsaw: Wydawnictwa Uniwersytetu Warszawskiego. ISBN 978-83-235-0234-0.
- Kirpichnikov, Anatol Nikolayevich (1988). "Древнерусское святилище у Пскова". Древности славян и Руси (in Russian). Moscow: Nauka. ISBN 5-02-009419-6.
- Łowmiański, Henryk (1979). Religia Słowian i jej upadek, w. VI-XII (in Polish). Warsaw: Państwowe Wydawnictwo Naukowe. ISBN 83-01-00033-3.
- Łuczyński, Michał (2020). Bogowie dawnych Słowian. Studium onomastyczne (in Polish). Kielce: Kieleckie Towarzystwo Naukowe. ISBN 978-83-60777-83-1.
- Pukanec, Martin (2013). Martin Pukanec: Etymologický nákres slovanského sveta bohov a démonov (náboženstva a morálky Slovanov) (in Slovak). Nitra: Constantine the Philosopher University. ISBN 978-80-558-0280-0.
- Santos Marinas, Enrique (2013). "Reassessment, Unification, and Enlargement of the Sources of Slavic Pre-Christian Religion". Russian History. 40 (1): 27–40. doi:10.1163/18763316-04001003. ISSN 0094-288X.
- Szyjewski, Andrzej (2003). Religia Słowian (in Polish). Kraków: Wydawnictwo WAM. ISBN 83-7318-205-5.
- Trubachyov, Oleg (1987). "*kъrsъ". Этимологический словарь русского языка (in Russian). Vol. 13. Moscow: Nauka.
- Váňa, Zdeněk (1990). Svět slovanských bohů a démonů (in Czech). Praga: Panorama. ISBN 80-7038-187-6.
- Vasil'yev, Mikhail Alexandrovich (1999). Язычество восточных славян накануне крещения Руси: Религиозно-мифологическое взаимодействие с иранским миром. Языческая реформа князя Владимира (in Russian). Moscow: Индрик. ISBN 978-5-85759-087-4.
