= Prillwitz idols =

Bronze figurines and plates

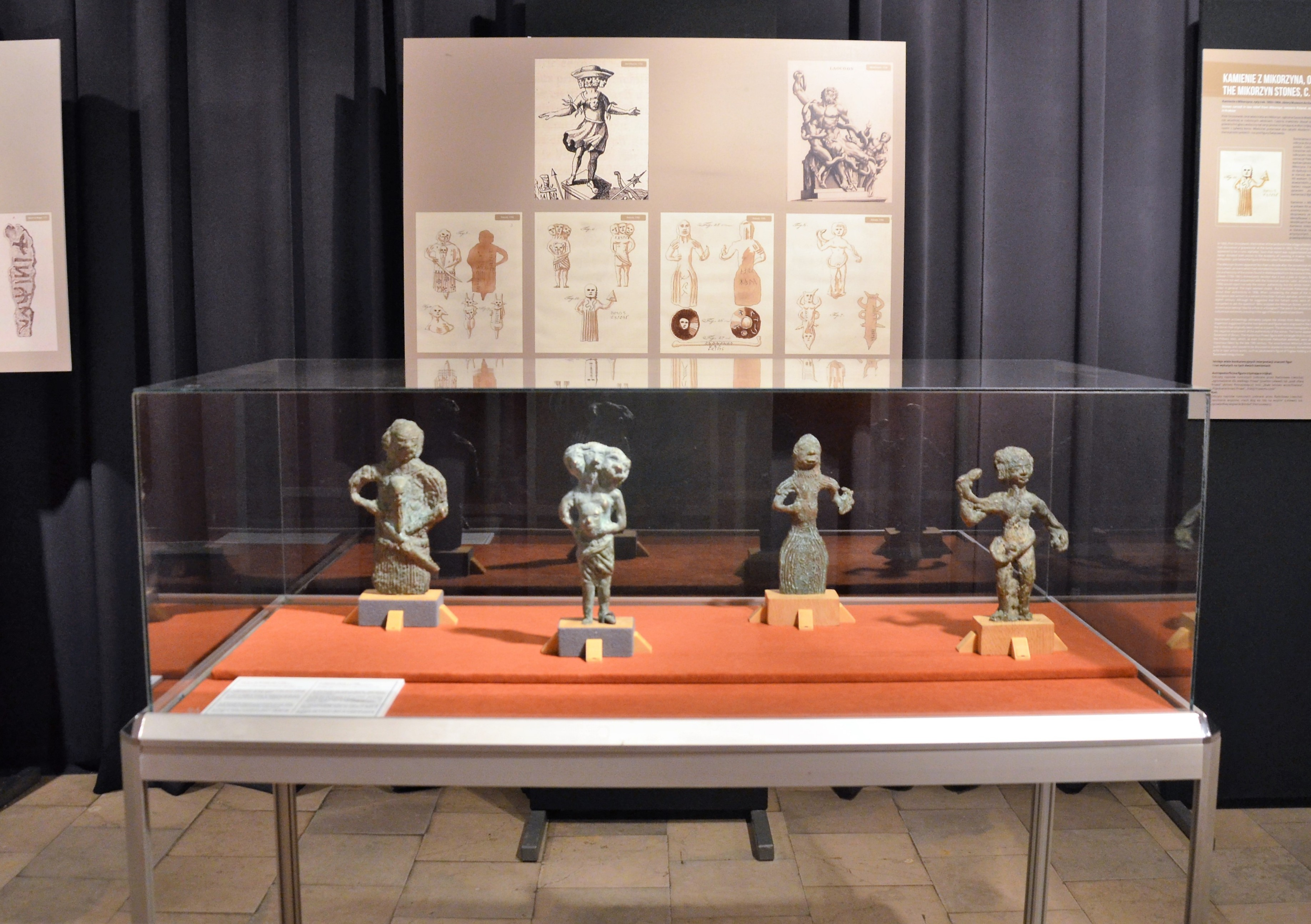
Prillwitz idols in Mecklenburg Folk Arts Museum

The Prillwitz idols are a large number of bronze figurines and bronze relief plates allegedly found in the late 17th century. The first publication about them, in 1768, further claimed that the figurines found by the village of Prillwitz (now part of Hohenzieritz) came from a pagan shrine in Rethra, a major town of Polabian Slavs, and Prillwitz is the location of Rethra. A detailed description was published in a 1771 book by Andreas Gottlieb Masch, with illustrations by Daniel Woge. Nowadays they are recognized as an archaeological forgery.

== History ==
While the story was questioned from the very beginning, many experts believed their authenticity, and disputes about them continued well into the 19th century. Finally, with the progress in research techniques in archaeology have led to the conclusion that the technique of some of the molds was from recent times, while others, while being apparently authentic, had no evidence of the connection with Slavic peoples.

== Figurines ==
The find contained over 180 idols, instruments and metal utensils. Masch's book presented 66 illustrations (some objects presented in several figures). Count Jan Potocki subsequently described over 118 more. (Note: Voyage dans quelques Parties de la Basse Saxe pour la Recherce des Antiques Slaves ou Vends fait en 1794 par le Compte Jean Potocki, title citing from Bell, p. 279.) With a few exceptions each idol was inscribed with a name in runic characters. Those figurines which are supposed to represent pagan gods have lion heads. From this Piekosiński concludes that these figurines could not be made by Polabian Slavs of pagan times, since they hardly saw lions. Masch mentioned the following names:

- Temple gods (Tempelgötter)
  - Radegast: Figure 1 p. 51, Figure 2, p. 56, Figure 3
  - Podba, Fig. 4
  - Podaga, Fig. 5
  - Percunust, Fig. 6 =? Perkunas
  - Nemisa, Fig. 7
  - Zislbog, Fig. 8, Zislbocg =? Chislobog
  - Ipabocg, Fig. 9
  - Zibog, Fig.11
  - Schwaixtix Fig. 13 =? Swiatowit
  - As?ri, Fig. 14
  - Sieba, Fig. 15
  - Zernebocg, Fig. 17 =? Chernobog
- Other
  - Lelus und Polelus, Fig. 20 = Lel and Polel
  - Der Herbstgott, Fig. 25
  - Zirnitra, Fig. 34
  - Wodan =? Odin
  - Balduri =? Baldr
  - Misizla, Fig. 63
  - Plusso
  - Zois, Fig. 62
  - Ein Opfermesser der Swantewit, Fig. 50 = Sacrificial knife of Swiatowit
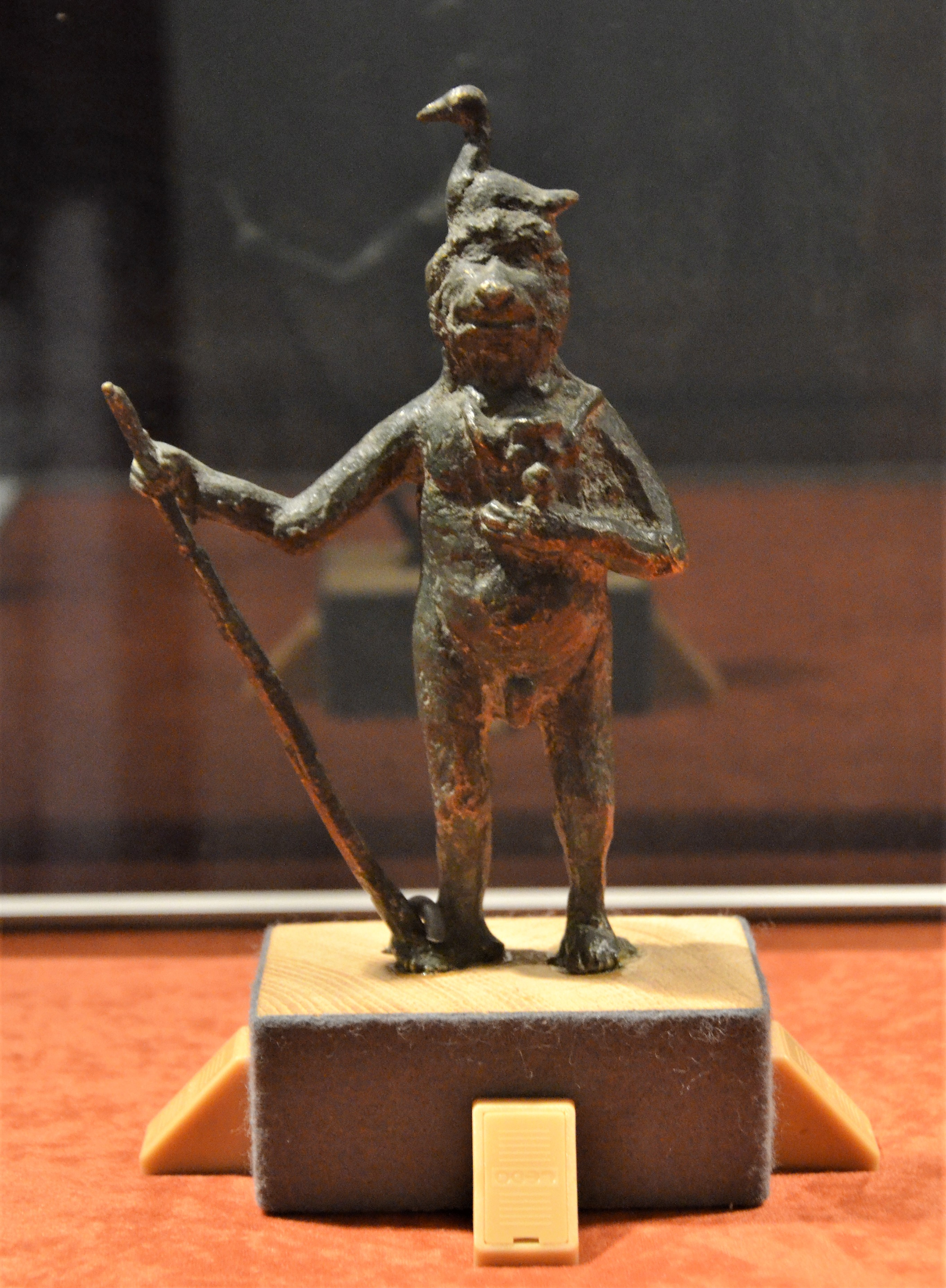
Radegast

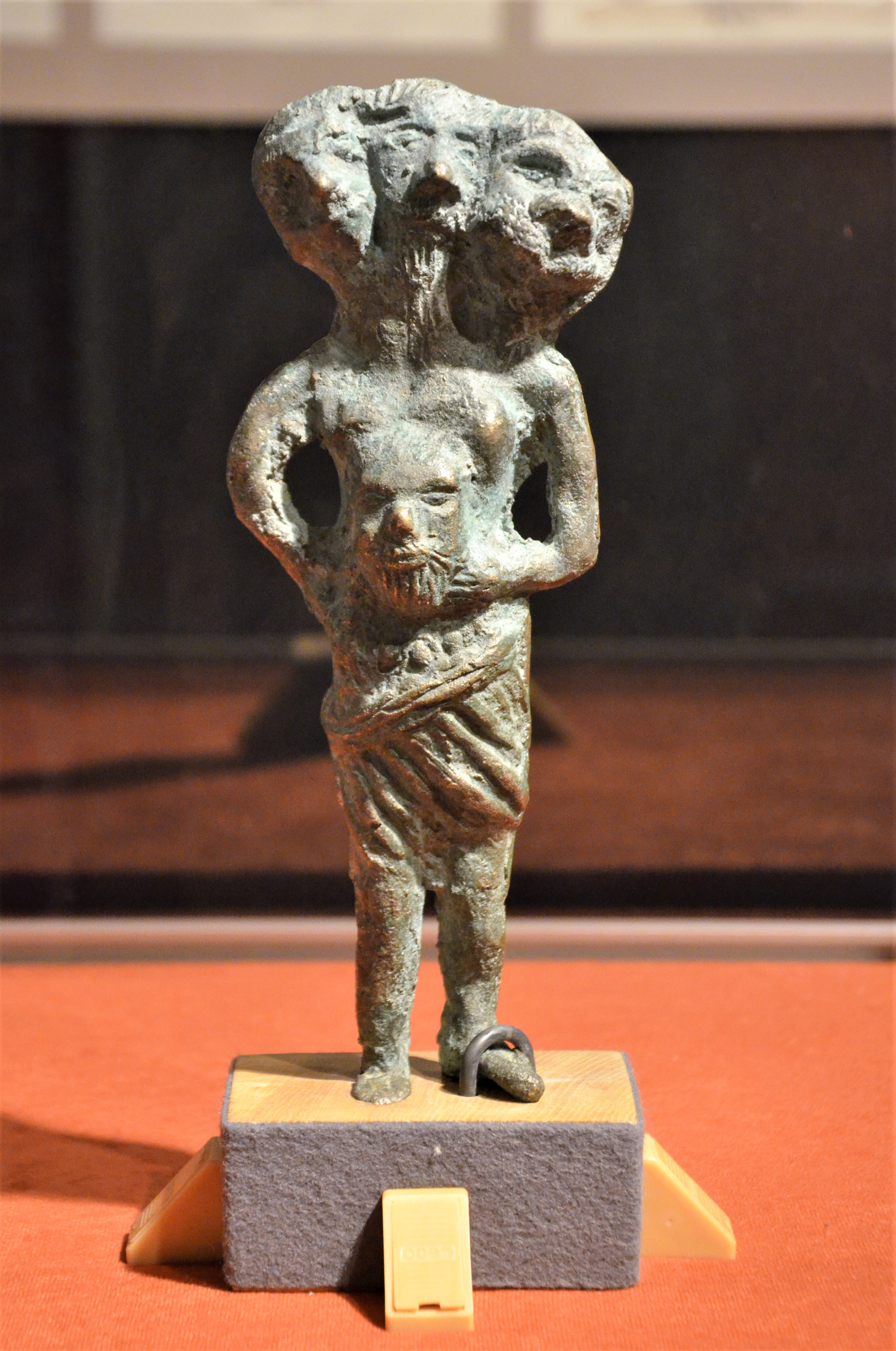
Triglav

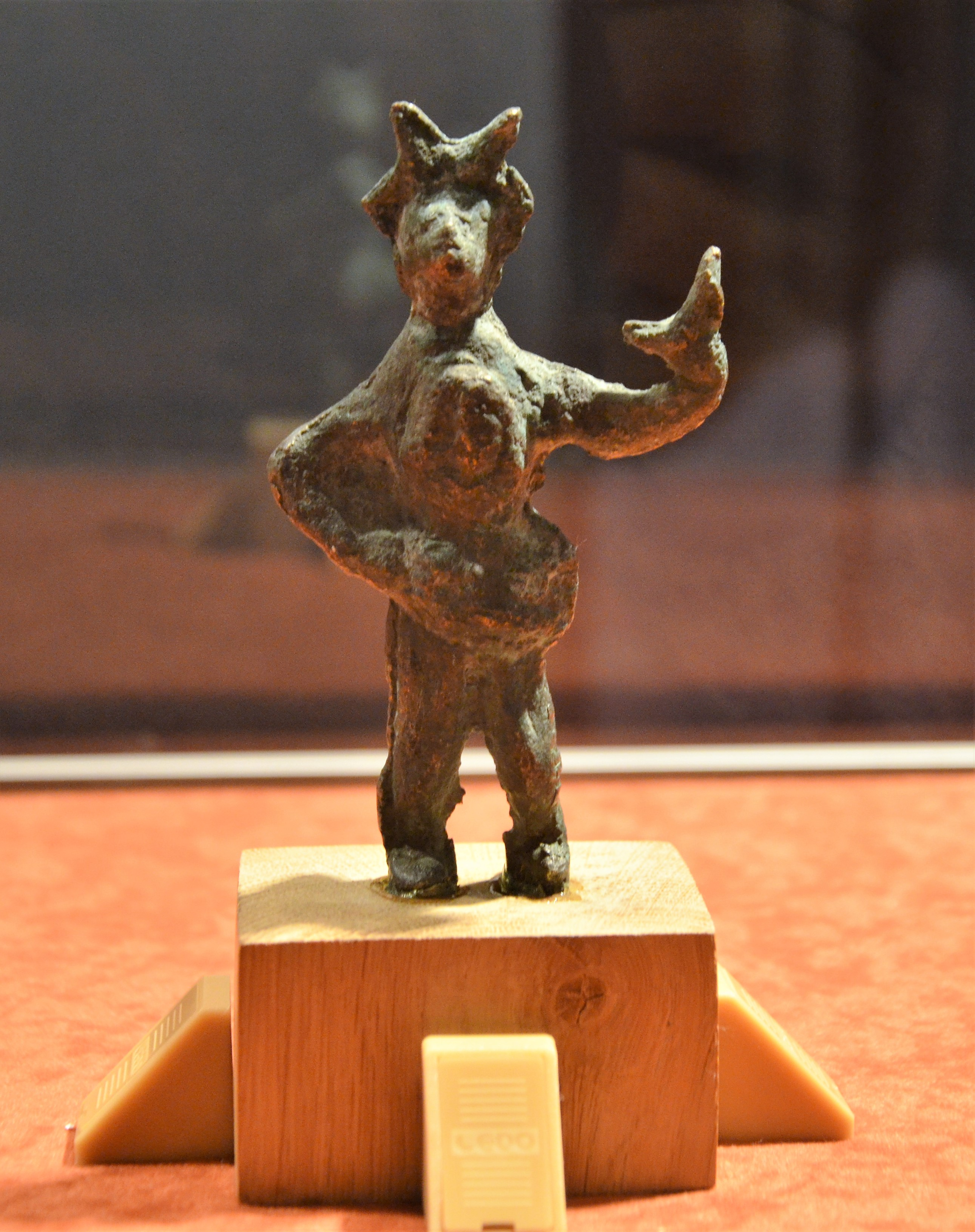

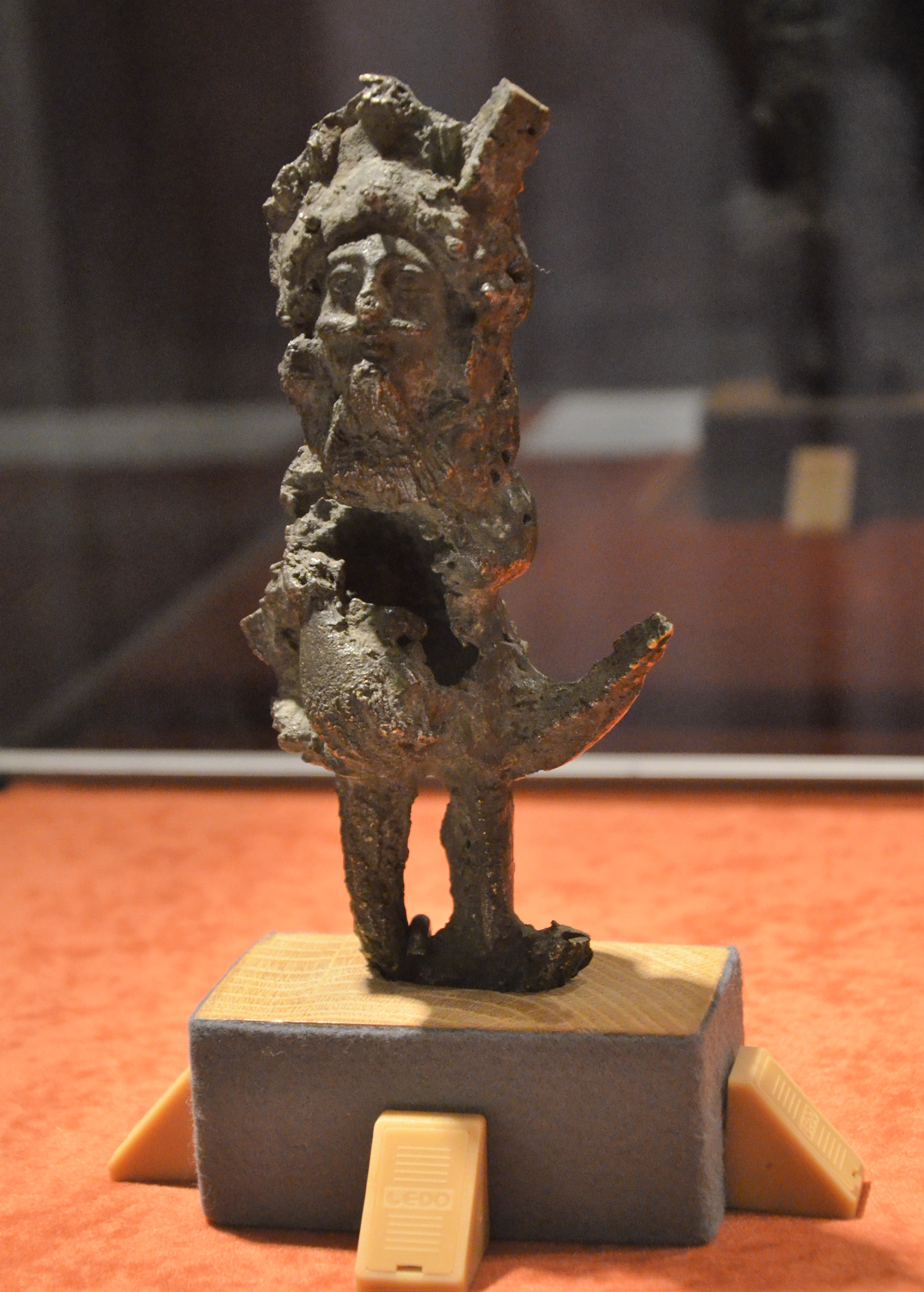

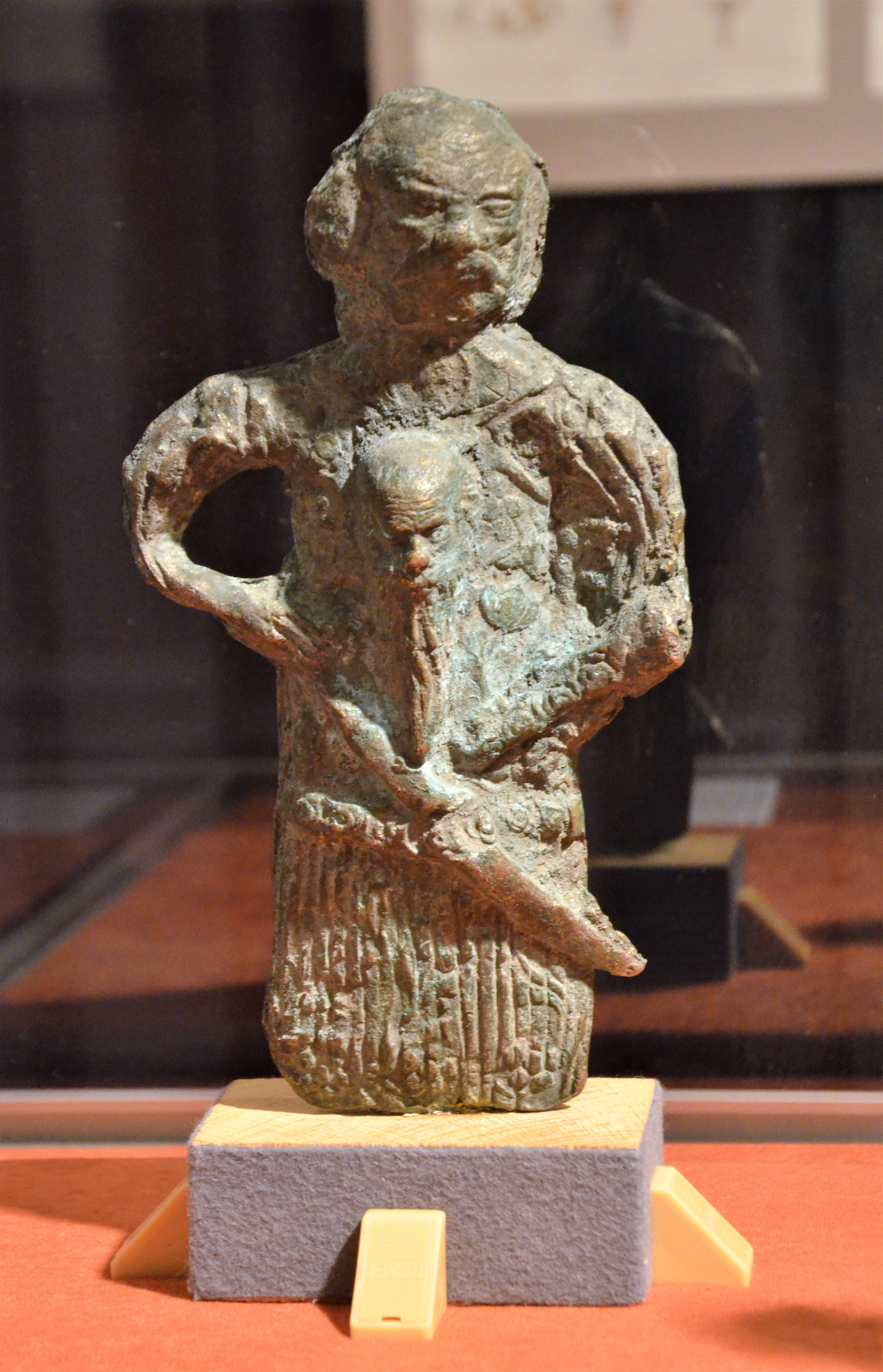

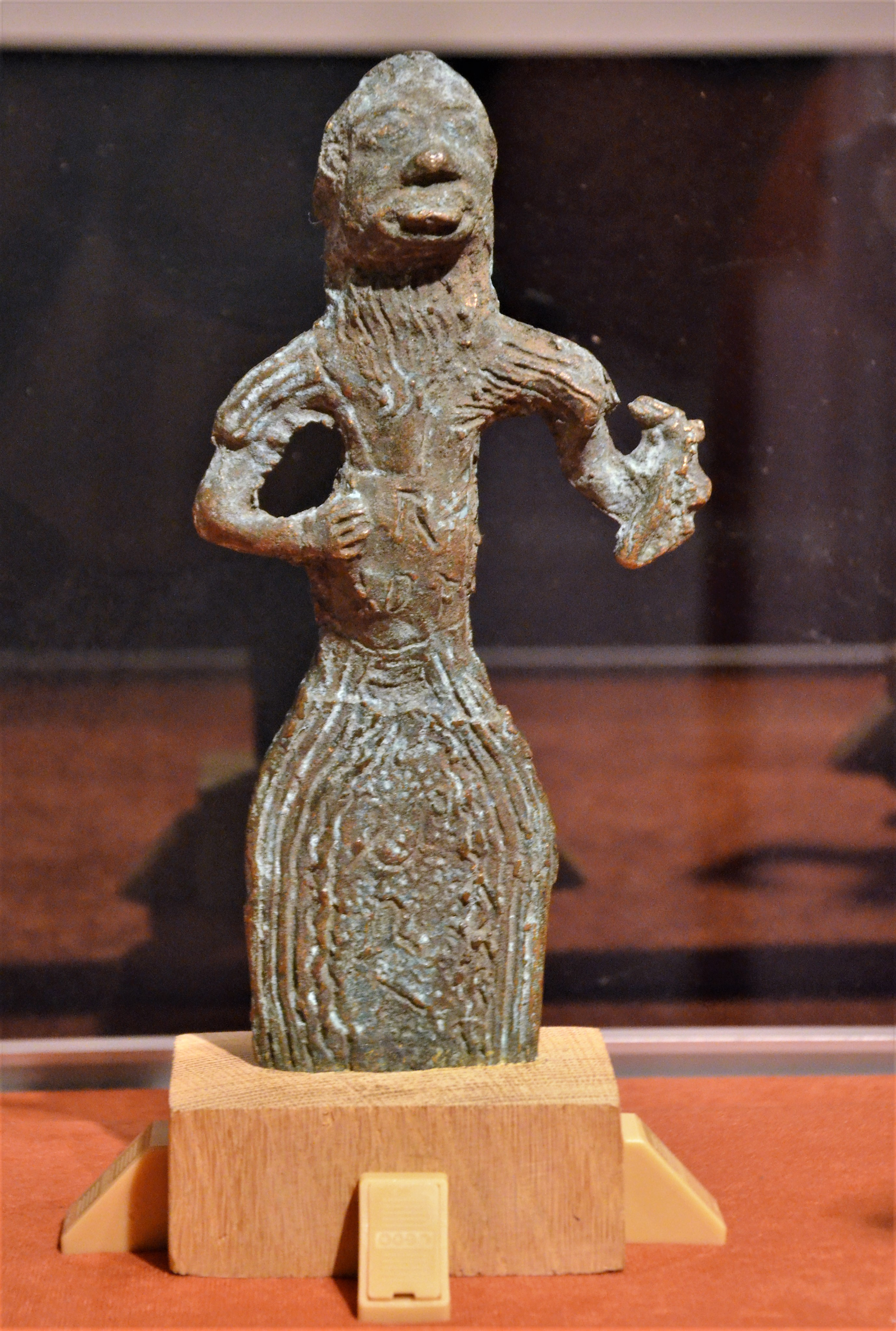

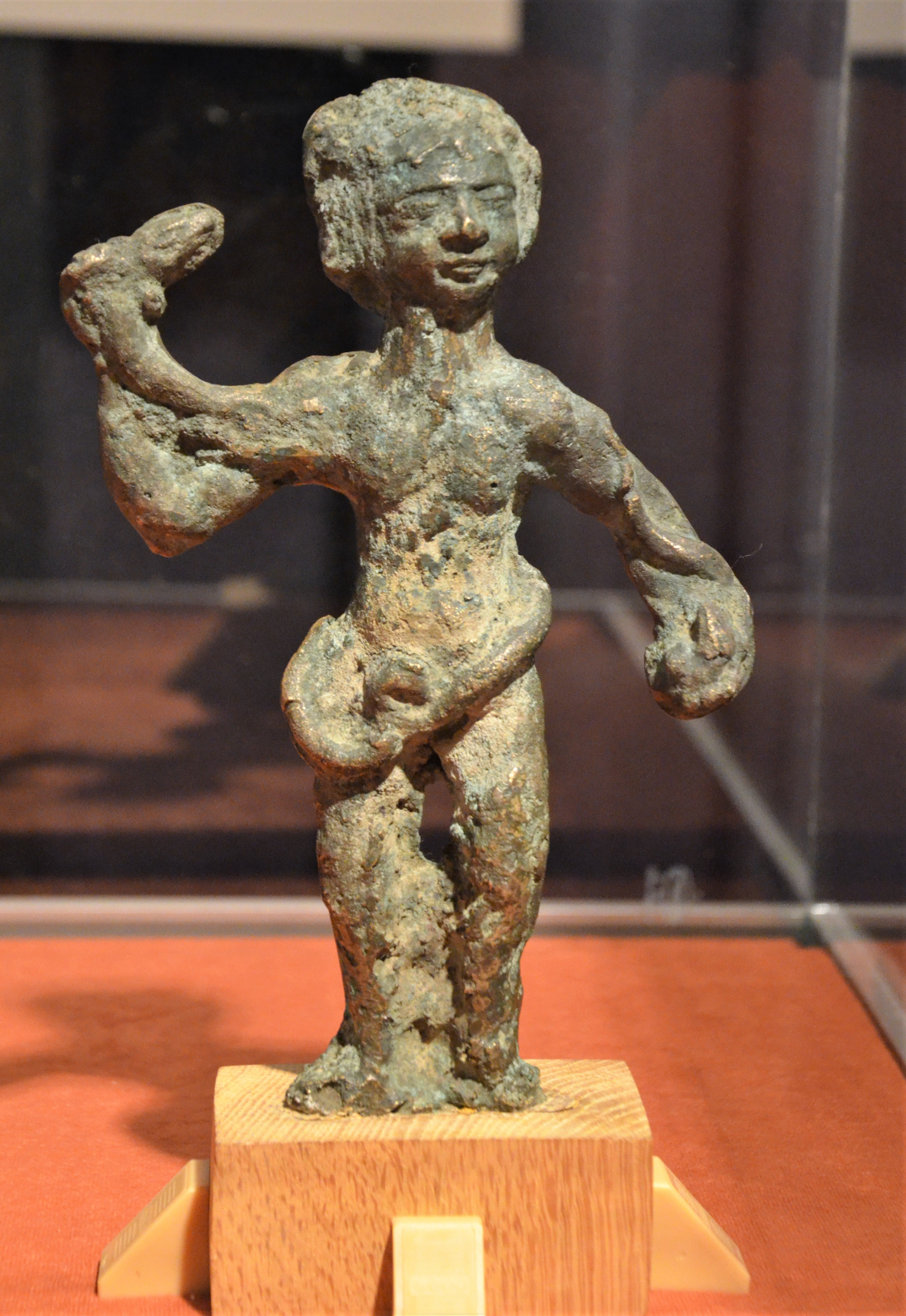

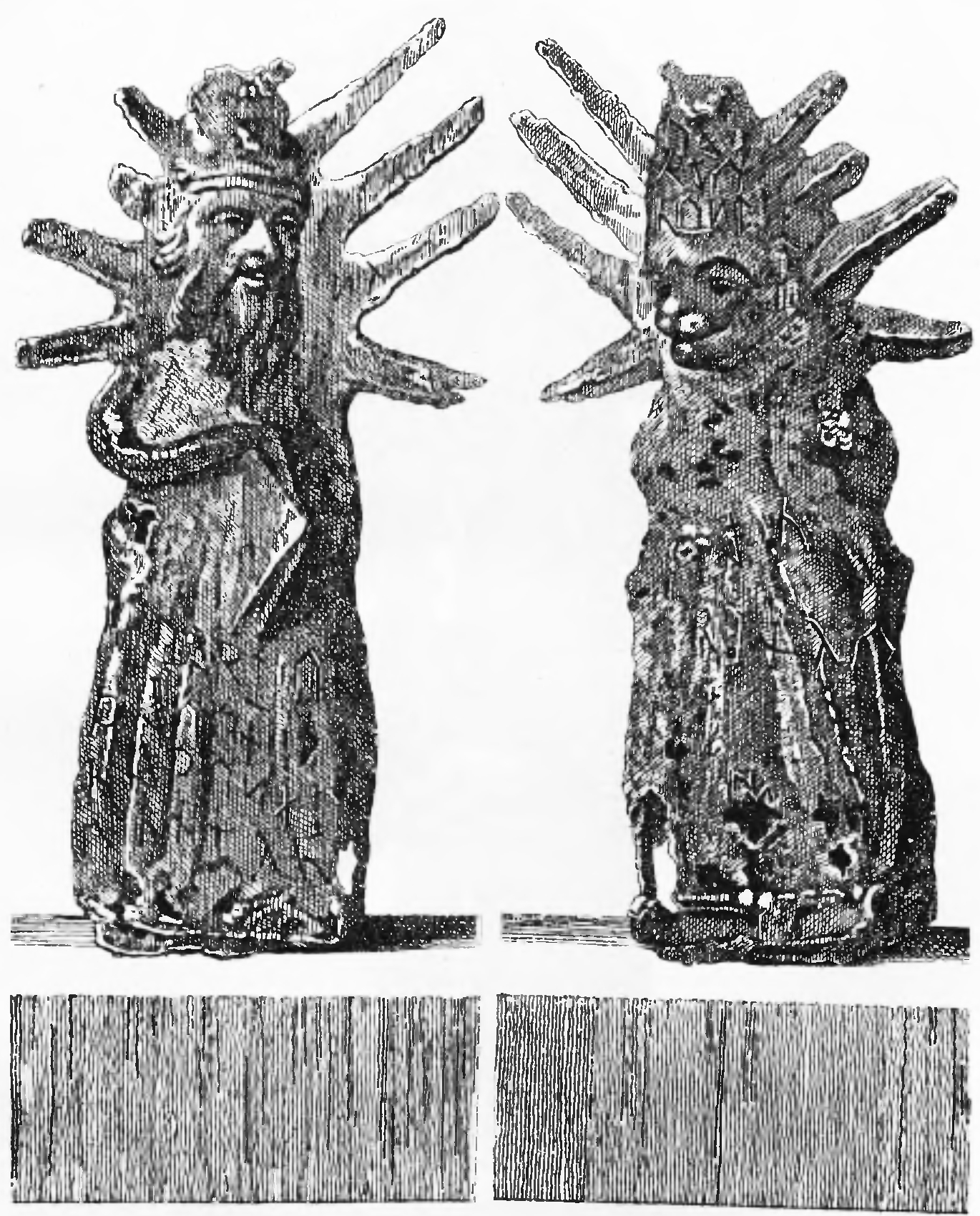
Perkunust
