= Uslad =

Slavic pseudo-deity

Uslad (Russian: Услад) is a Slavic pseudo-deity, whose name appeared from the misreading of the words 'усъ златъ' ("golden moustache") from the Primary Chronicle. This misinterpretation / misreading was recognized already in the 19th century, by e.g., Izmail Sreznevsky (1812–1880).

== History ==
=== Original misinterpretation ===
When reading the Primarily Chronicle in the part in which Slavic pagan idols erected by Vladimir of Kiev are described, Sigismund von Herberstein recognized the words "golden moustache" (us zlat) in the description of the statue of Perun as an independent name Uslad. In the Primary Chronicle:

И нача къняжити Володимеръ въ Кыевѣ единъ, и постави кумиры на хълмѣ вънѣ двора теремьнаго: Перуна древяна, а главу его сьребряну, а усъ златъ, и Хърса Дажьбога и Стрибога и Сѣмарьгла и Мокошь.

Modern English translation:

Vladimir then began to reign alone in Kiev, and he set up idols on the hills outside the castle with the hall: one of Perun, made of wood with a head of silver and a mustache of gold, and others of Khors, Dazh'bog, Stribog, Simar'gl, and Mokosh'.

Herberstein's translation:

Volodimerus multa idola Kioviae institut: primus idolum Perun dictum capite argento, caetere lignea errant; alia, Uslad, Corsa, Dasva, Striba, Simaergla, Macosch vocabitur

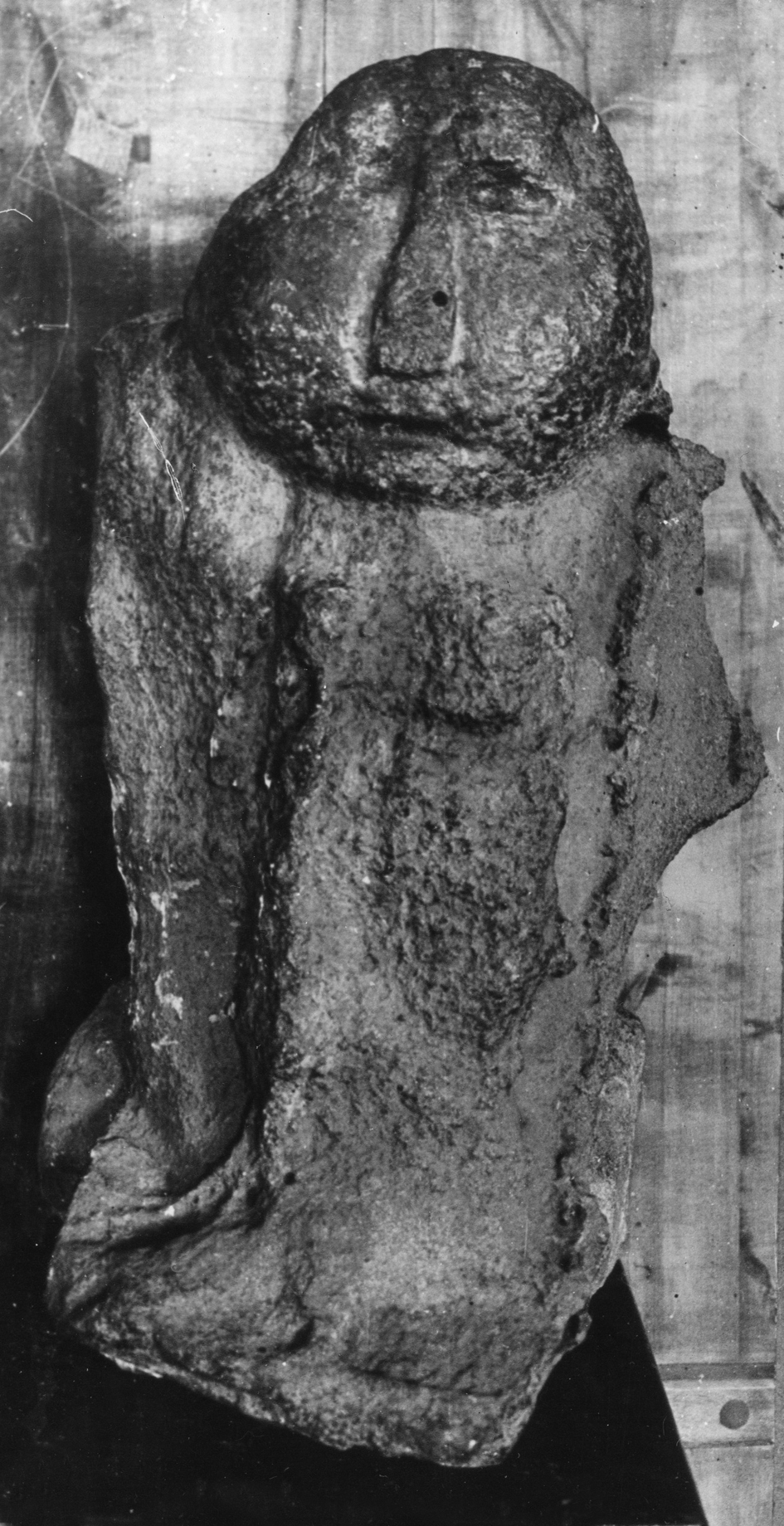
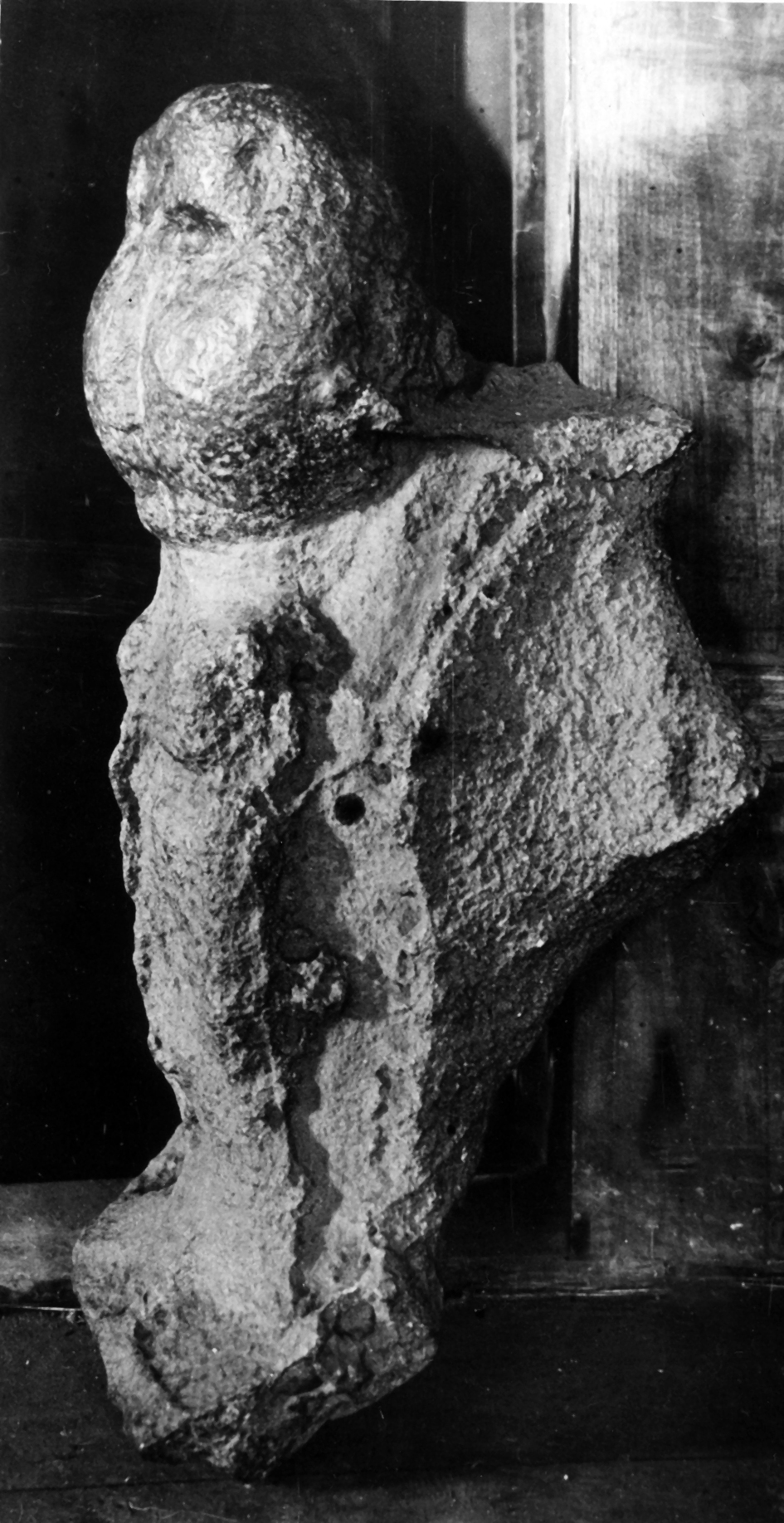
Stone baba found near Pskov. Some think that it matches Vunderer's description of Uslad, and according to Anatoliy Kirpichnikov it is Khors or Dazhbog.

Polish historian Maciej Stryjkowski in his 1582 Chronicle duplicated this misreading:

drugie bałwany były mianowane Usład, Korssa, Dassuba, Striba, Symaergla, Makosz

A reference to this deity was subsequently copied by a number of other authors.

This mistake was further propagated by German traveler Johann David Wunderer, who traveled in Russia from 1589 to 1590 and described Pskov in his memoir, mentioned the statues of Khors and Uslad that were supposed to be located near Pskov:

In front of the town we saw two idols, set up in olden times by the priests who worshipped them, namely, Usad, whose stone statue holds a cross in his hand, (and) Khors, who stands on a serpent, with a sword in one hand and a thunderbolt (literally, a ray of fire - A.K.) in the other.

Russian archaeologist Anatoliy Kirpichnikov questioned Wunderer's interpretation of the find.

=== Cabinet mythology ===
Since 18th century a number of Russian authors started embellishing scarcely described Russian paganism with various speculations, with patriotic intentions of creating "Russian antiquity". Endeavors of this kind were derisively named "cabinet mythology" by Russian historians. In particular, Russian poet and philologist Grigory Glinka published a 1804 book Древняя религия славян (The Ancient Religion of Slavs). While basing on previous sources, he admitted that he did add his own inventions. Among the 59 mythological figures presented as Slavic gods he gave a poetic description of Uslad: "Joy on the brow, blush on the cheeks, smiling lips, crowned with flowers, dressed carelessly in a light robe, playing the kobza, and dancing to its voice."..."He was revered as the patron of all pleasures and amusements." He capitalized on the faux etymology of the name as coming from the word uslada, 'pleasure', 'amusement'.
