= Daniel Woge =

German painter and drawer

Daniel Woge (1717-1797) was a German drawer (artists) and painter.

== Life ==
He was born in Berlin and trained under Antoine Pesne before being summoned to Neustrelitz by Adolphus Frederick IV to be his court painter. He remained in the town until his death there. He mainly produced portraits of Adolphus Frederick and his family, though he did also produce altarpieces (such as that for the Nikolaikirche in Friedland) and produced drawings which others worked up for engravings. All the major museums in Mecklenburg have paintings by him in their collections - there are also some in the portrait collection at Gripsholm Castle in Sweden.

In 1770 he was commissioned by Crown Prince Charles to paint a series in oils showing the Prillwitz idols. Johann Conrad Krüger produced engravings after the original paintings and these were included in the 1771 volume Die gottesdienstlichen Alterthümer der Obotriten aus dem Tempel zu Rhetra, am Tollenzer-See, co-authored by Andreas Gottlieb Masch and Woge himself

== Selected works ==
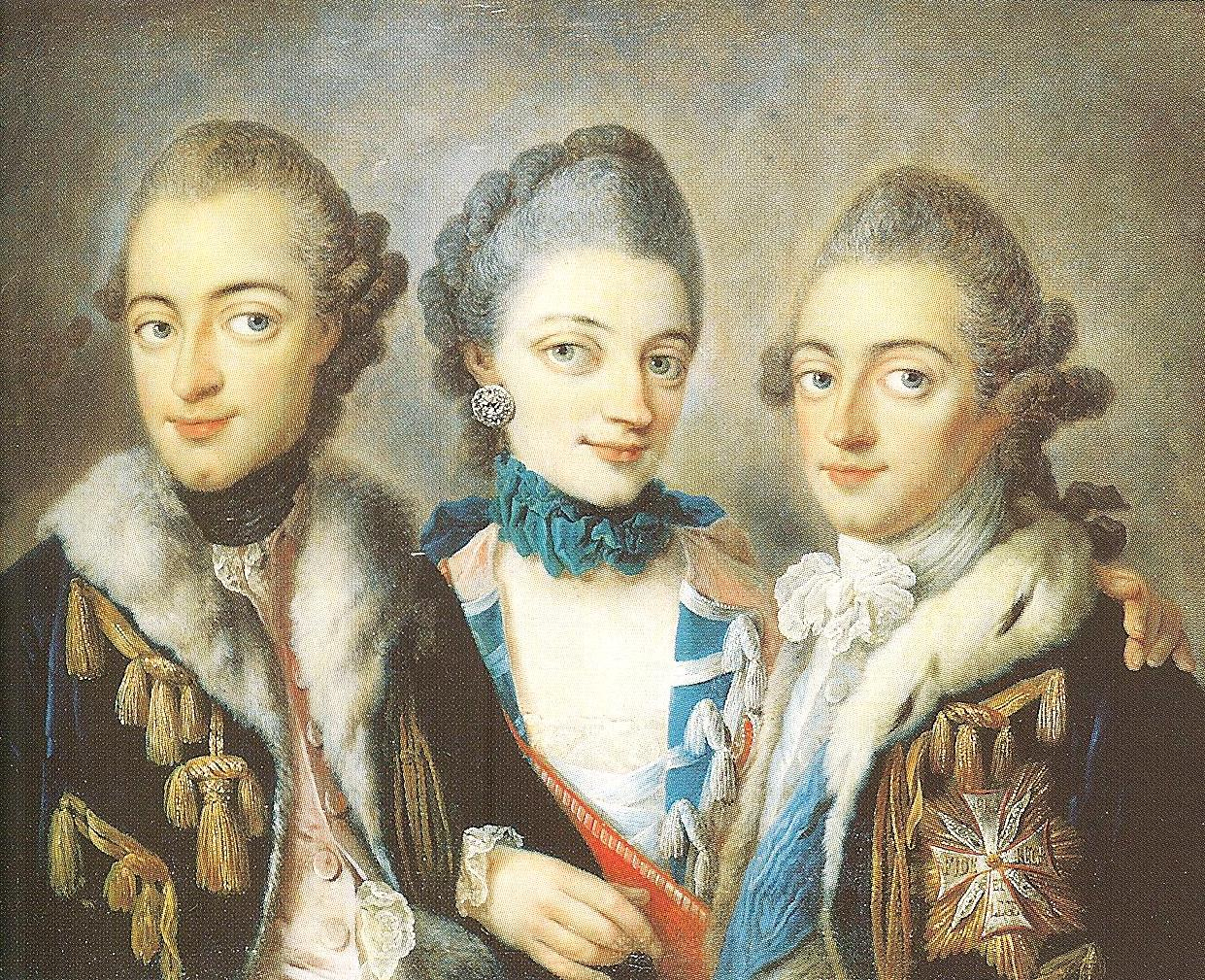
Duke Adolphus Frederick IV and His Siblings, Staatliches Museum Schwerin.

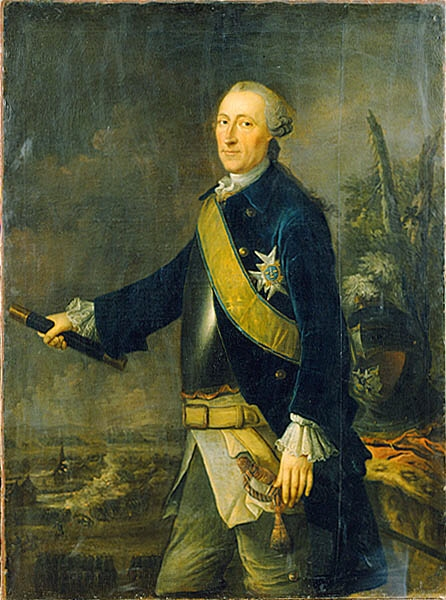
Reinhold Johan von Lingen

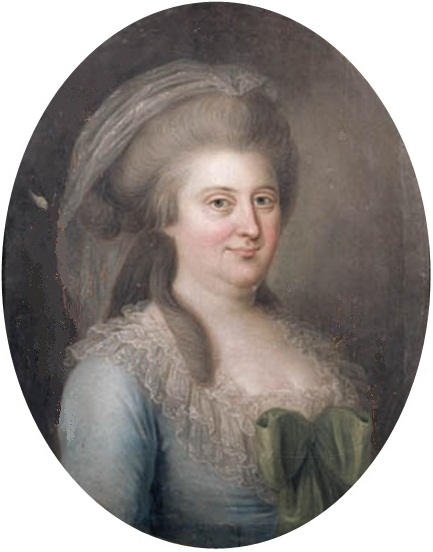
Portrait of Louisa of Saxe-Gotha-Altenburg (1756–1808)

=== Germany ===
- Portrait of the Dukes and their Sisters Kneeling in the Schlossmuseum Neustrelitz (possibly destroyed in 1945)
- Open Air Concert, oil on canvas, 54 × 44 cm, Staatliches Museum Schwerin
- Nikolaikirche altarpiece, Friedland (Mecklenburg) (possibly destroyed in 1945)
- Duke Adolphus Frederick IV., c. 1760, oil on canvas, 137 × 100 cm, Staatliches Museum Schwerin
- Duke Adolphus Frederick IV and His Sister, Staatliches Museum Schwerin (attributed only)
- A Mother's Joy, Altes Rathaus, Neubrandenburg (possibly destroyed in 1945)

=== Sweden ===
The Gripsholm Castle portrait collection includes three oil on canvas works by him:

- Lieutenant-General Reinhold Johan von Lingen, inscribed "D. Woge pinxit Stralsund 1759", 151 × 112.5 cm
- Karl Gustav Strömschiöld, schwedischer Oberst, inscribed "D. Woge pinxit Stralsund 1759", 76 × 60 cm
- Axel Fredrik von Fersen (1719–1794), 85 × 69 cm

=== United Kingdom ===
The British Royal Collection houses three works by him, all oil on canvas:

- Duchess Elisabeth Albertine, c. 1740–1752, 80 × 63.5 cm
- Duke Charles, ca. 1740–1752, Öl auf Leinwand, 81,4 × 67,5 cm
- Duke Adolphus Frederick IV, signed and dated 1768, 68.3 × 54.1 cm

=== Other ===
Four other portraits by Woge formerly in the private collection of the House of Mecklenburg-Schwerin and in the 1954 catalogue of the Staatlichen Museum Schwerin, were returned to the family and then in 1999 auctioned at Christie's in Amsterdam:

- Duchess Louise Charlotte (ca. 1790)
- Louisa of Saxe-Gotha-Altenburg (1756–1808) (c. 1784/88)
- Louisa of Saxe-Gotha-Altenburg (1756–1808)
- Adolphus Frederick IV, full length

== Bibliography ==
- (in German) Daniel Woge. In: Hans Vollmer (ed.): Allgemeines Lexikon der Bildenden Künstler von der Antike bis zur Gegenwart. Begründet von Ulrich Thieme und Felix Becker. Volume 36: Wilhelmy–Zyzywi. E. A. Seemann, Leipzig 1947, p. 172.
- (in German) Grete Grewolls: Wer war wer in Mecklenburg und Vorpommern. Das Personenlexikon. Hinstorff Verlag, Rostock 2011, ISBN 978-3-356-01301-6, p. 11010.
