= Prillwitz =

- Ortsteil of Hohenzieritz
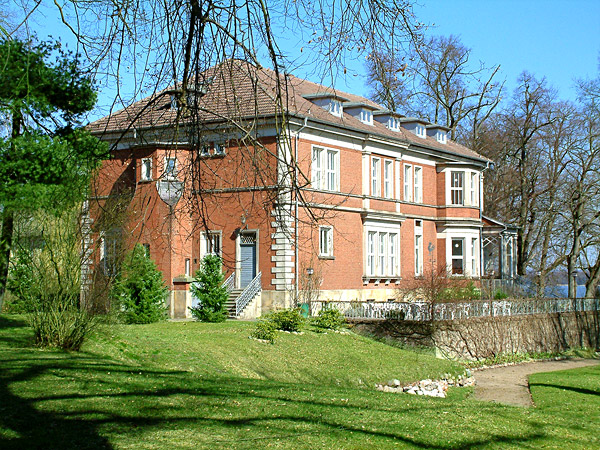
- Old hunting lodge
- Interactive map of Prillwitz
- Location within Germany Location within Mecklenburg-Vorpommern
- Coordinates: 53°27′13″N 13°08′12″E
- Country: Germany
- State: Mecklenburg-Vorpommern
- District: Mecklenburgische Seenplatte
- Municipality: Hohenzieritz
- Time zone: UTC+01:00 (CET)
  - Summer (DST): UTC+02:00 (CEST)

Prillwitz is a small village in the municipality of Hohenzieritz, in Mecklenburg-Vorpommern (Mecklenburg-West Pomerania), on the shores of the lake Lieps, in north-eastern Germany.

It lies approximately 125 kilometres north of Berlin through the B96 or 205 kilometres through the A20.

The settlement has a church and a small castle converted into a hotel and restaurant.

== History ==
During the final stages of World War II, on 18 February 1945, Prillwitz was the site of a stopover during the German-organised march of some 2,700 French prisoners of war from the Oflag II-B camp headed westwards.

== See also ==
- Prillwitz idols
