= Hohenzieritz =

- Municipality
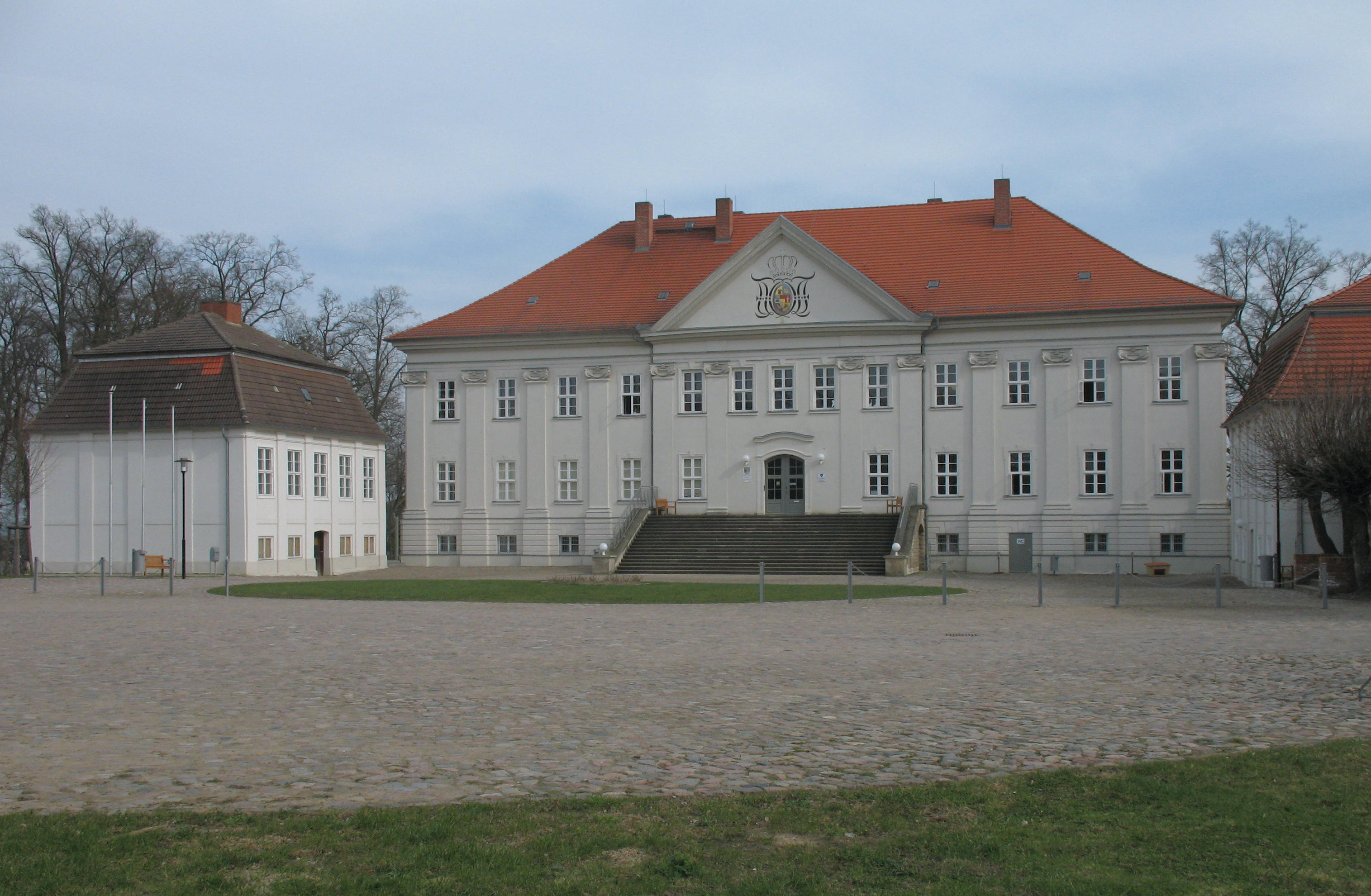
- Hohenzieritz Castle

- Location of Hohenzieritz within Mecklenburgische Seenplatte district
- Interactive map of Hohenzieritz
- Location within Germany Location within Mecklenburg-Vorpommern
- Coordinates: 53°26′37″N 13°05′56″E
- Country: Germany
- State: Mecklenburg-Vorpommern
- District: Mecklenburgische Seenplatte
- Municipal assoc.: Neustrelitz-Land

Government
  - Mayor: Bernhard Utesch

Area
  - Total: 20.17 km^{2} (7.79 sq mi)
- Elevation: 85 m (279 ft)

Population (2025-12-31)
  - Total: 430
  - Density: 21/km^{2} (55/sq mi)
- Time zone: UTC+01:00 (CET)
  - Summer (DST): UTC+02:00 (CEST)
- Postal codes: 17237
- Dialling codes: 039824, 039826
- Vehicle registration: MST
- Website: www.amtneustrelitz-land.de

Hohenzieritz is a municipality in the district Mecklenburgische Seenplatte, in Mecklenburg-Vorpommern, in north-eastern Germany.

== History ==
Louise of Mecklenburg-Strelitz died here in 1810.

During the final stages of World War II, on 18 February 1945, Prillwitz (now part of the municipality) was the site of a stopover during the German-organised march of some 2,700 French prisoners of war from the Oflag II-B camp headed westwards.
