= Sigmund von Herberstein =

Sigmund von Herberstein (born 1644 in Graz) was an Austrian clergyman and bishop for the Roman Catholic Archdiocese of Ljubljana. He was ordained in 1667. He was appointed bishop in 1683. He died in 1716.
