= Franjo Ledić =

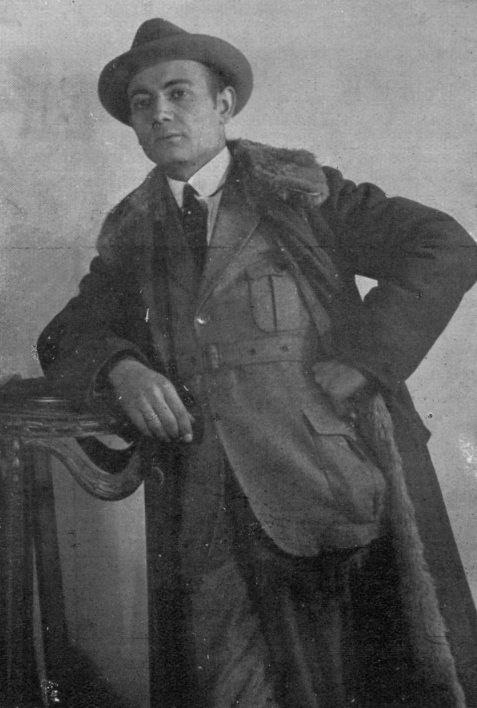
- Photograph of Ledić, 1910s, Berlin
- Born: 12 March 1892; Derventa
- Died: 26 September 1981 (aged 89); Zagreb
- Resting place: Miroševac Cemetery, Zagreb
- Other names: Dervenćanin, Stric Štef

Franjo Ledić (Croatian pronunciation: [fɾa:ɲo le:ditɕ]; 12 March 1892 – 26 September 1981) was a Yugoslav expressionist film director, producer and screenwriter from Derventa, one of the first notable Croatian film authors and self-proclaimed "first Yugoslav film director". He is best known for founding "Ocean-film" (later known as Jadran film), the first film studio in Croatia, and attempting to build the "Yugoslav Hollywood" in Zagreb in the 1920s. He published the first Croatian book and journal about film.

Ledić also received attention as a Croatian mythologist, authoring a total of three popular self-published works on Slavic paganism. These works were later highly criticized by Croatian ethnologists, who judged Ledić's reconstructions of the 'Croatian pantheon' to be "romanticized", "uncritical" and "arbitrary", pointing also to a lack of verifiable sources in his works.

== Biography ==
=== Early life and Berlin ===
Ledić was born in Derventa, Austria-Hungary, in 1892. He graduated from a public school and travelled across Europe between the years 1907 and 1910. In 1911 he settled in Berlin, and started to work various jobs in Oskar Messter's productions from 1912: an extra, set designer, make-up artist, assistant camera operator etc. During his stay in Berlin, after shooting several short films in the late 1910s, he screenwrote and acted as assistant director for Ernst Lubitsch's Sumurun and Anna Boleyn, co-directed, produced and screenwrote Angelo, Das Mysterium des Schlosses Drachenegg ("Angelo: The Mystery of Dragontown") with Robert Leffler, and directed his first successful movie, Cornelie Arendt. After this, he founded the first iteration of his movie company Ocean-film in Berlin, which got him praise from the journals Film-Kurier ("Film Courier") and Zentralblatt für die Filmindustrie ("Central Paper for the Film Industry"). The journals described Ledić as a "Turk" and orientalist whose goal it was to export German film to the Middle East and the Balkan region.

==== Angelo ====
Angelo was a 70-minute long (Note: The reel was 1923 meters long, amounting to a 70-minute long screening.) movie in six acts authored after Ledić's synonymous novel, and the first movie produced by Ocean-film. The film was in production for two years before its premiere. In November 1919, it went on to be aggressively marketed and widely reported on in German newspapers, several months ahead of the Berlin premiere, which coincided with the showing of The Cabinet of Dr. Calligari. In December, one month prior to the screening, advertisements announced the cast, with Leffler as director (though this would be left out in the 1921 Croatian premiere) and starring Lina Salten and Ernst Dernburg. The movie premiered on 13 February 1920 and by then, advertising and reports about the movie had already slowed down significantly, most likely due to a lack of funds. The movie ultimately received mixed reviews by critics, but still got successful showings in other countries, such as the US, Czechia, Italy and a few more. For a showing held one year after the premiere, the title had been changed to Schreckensnacht auf Schloss Drachenegg ("A Horrible Night at Castle Dragontown").

Preserved sequences of the film were bought by the Yugoslav Film Archive in the 1960s, and are now kept at the Croatian Film Archive. To this day, the sequences were not able to be fully reconstructed, but 38 seconds of the movie and several shots have been preserved.

=== Return to Yugoslavia ===
Ledić moved to Italy in 1921, where he stayed until 1925 and directed several short films. He was ultimately dissatisfied with this and moved again to Zagreb, Croatia, where he founded Ocean-film again, this time as a Yugoslav company. Ledić then bought land on Horvaćanska street, where he built a film studio with the support of Oktavijan Miletić. The studio was a complex in the secessionist style, nicknamed "Yugoslav Hollywood". Not long after, the company was renamed to Jadran-film, and Ledić went on to publish the first Croatian book on film (Film. Tko hoće k filmu?, "Film. Who Wants to Work in Film?", 1925) and the first Croatian film journal (Narodna filmska umjetnost, "National Art of Film", 1926), containing poems dedicated to himself and details on shooting his films. He began filming and advertising Ciganska krv – Dobrotvorka Balkana ("Gypsy Blood – The Balkan Benefactor"), which was remade into the short film Ciganin hajduk Brnja Ajvanar (1927) due to financial issues. Finances eventually forced him to sell his studio (which became known as "Vila Kiseljak", after its later owner's family). After another failure in the box office, the movie Njih dvoje ("The Two of Them") by Đuka Berkeš, Ledić was briefly imprisoned as he was unable able to pay off his debts.

=== WWII and SFR Yugoslavia ===
Having been released from prison, Ledić continued publishing his second film journal Zvono ("The Bell", 1926) and worked as a traveling reporter within the Kingdom of Yugoslavia. During the regime of the Independent State of Croatia, he worked for the Državni slikopisni zavod ("State Movie Institute", popularly known as "Croatia film") as a news camera operator. With the end of the Second World War, Ledić was interned by the Yugoslav authorities and Jadran-film was seized by the state.

Ledić continued to publish written works in the SFR Yugoslavia, poems and prose themed around his home region of Derventa. His late publicist works, most notably his self-published compilations titled Mitologija Slavena ("Mythology of the Slavs", 1969–1970), became popular in Croatia as sources on ancient Slavic paganism. Today, however, Croatian ethnologists consider them to be artefacts of the past that are, among other similar works, fundamentally unverifiable. Ethnologist Lidija Bajuk notes that Ledić's reconstruction of the 'Croatian pantheon', based largely on the work of psychologist Nikola Sučić, is "arbitrary and unverifiable", and she includes Ledić (as well as Sučić) on the list of authors whose work she believes to be "uncritical ponderings". Tea Škokić, another ethnology doctorate, believes that Ledić's interpretations of the pantheon are romanticized, and notes how he does not cite any sources for his claims.

He died on September 26, 1981, and was buried on Miroševac Cemetery in Dubrava, Zagreb.

== Works ==
=== Film ===
- U borbi sa suncem ("Fighting the Sun", short film in four acts, 1918)
- Klub samoubojica ("Suicide Club", short film in two acts, 1918)
- Propast svijeta ("The End of the World", short film in two acts, 1918)
- Cornelie Arendt (short film, 1919)
- Angelo. Das Mysterium des Schlosses Drachenegg (Angelo. Misterij Zmajgrada; "Angelo: The Mystery of Dragontown", feature in six acts, 1920)
  - retitled in 1921: Schreckensnacht auf Schloss Drachenegg ("A Horrible Night at Castle Dragontown")
- Proslava hiljadugodišnjice hrvatskog kraljevstva ("Celebration of the Millenial Anniversary of the Kingdom of Croatia", documentary, 1925)
- Treći svesokolski slet u Zagrebu ("Third Sokol Slet in Zagreb", 1925)
- Zvono ("The Bell", 1926–1939)
- Ciganska krv – Dobrotvorka Balkana ("Gypsy Blood – The Balkan Benefactor", advertisement, 1927)
  - remade into Ciganin hajduk Brnja Ajvanar (short film, 1927)
- Hrvatska u rieči i slici & Hrvatski slikopisni tjednik ("Croatia in Word and Image" & "Croatian Weekly News", 1941–1945)

=== Books ===
- Angelo. Das Mysterium des Schlosses Drachenegg (1920)
- Film. Tko hoće k filmu? ("Film. Who Wants to Work in Film?", 1925)
- Narodna filmska umjetnost ("National Art of Film", 1926)
- Pripovijest o djedu Ledonji ("A Tale of Grandfather Ledonja", 1953)
- Djedova ženidba ("Grandfather's Wedding", 1955)
- Crtice iz prošlosti grada Dervente ("Tales from the History of Derventa", 1958)
- Narodna filozofija u poslovicama o vuku ("Folk Philosophy in Proverbs about Wolves", 1960)
- Mitologija Slavena ("Mythology of the Slavs", 1969–1970)
- Divovske legende ("Legends of Giants", 1973–1974)

== Bibliography ==
- Bajuk, Lidija (2018). "Odjeci slavenskoga mita u nematerijalnoj kulturi Međimurja" [Echoes of Slavic mythology in the immaterial culture of Međimurje] (PDF).
- Rafaelić, Daniel (2016), "Franjo Ledić: A Forgotten Pioneer of German Expressionism", in Rhodes, Gary D.; Brill, Olaf (eds.), Expressionism in the Cinema, Edinburgh University Press, pp. 65–76, ISBN 978-1-4744-0326-9 – via CambridgeCore
