= Andreas Gottlieb Masch =

German Lutheran theologian and scholar

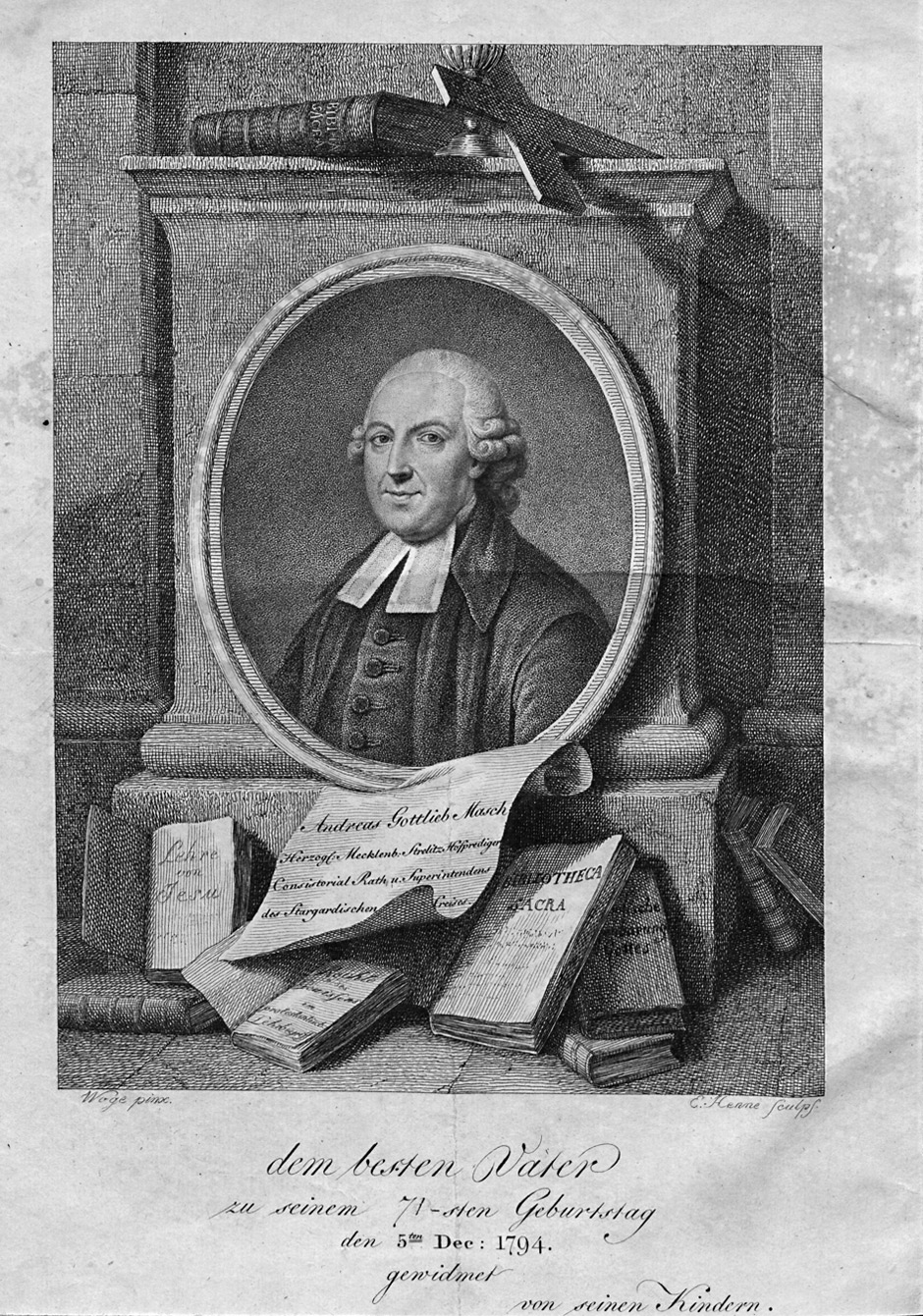
Masch in 1794

Andreas Gottlieb Masch (5 December 1724 – 26 October 1807) was a German Lutheran theologian and scholar.

He acted as superintendent for Mecklenburg-Strelitz and became court-preacher to the House of Mecklenburg-Strelitz at Neustrelitz, where he died. He is also known as Andreas Gottlieb Masch the Elder to distinguish him from his son of the same name.
