= Lutheran art =

Religious art produced for Lutherans and the Lutheran Churches

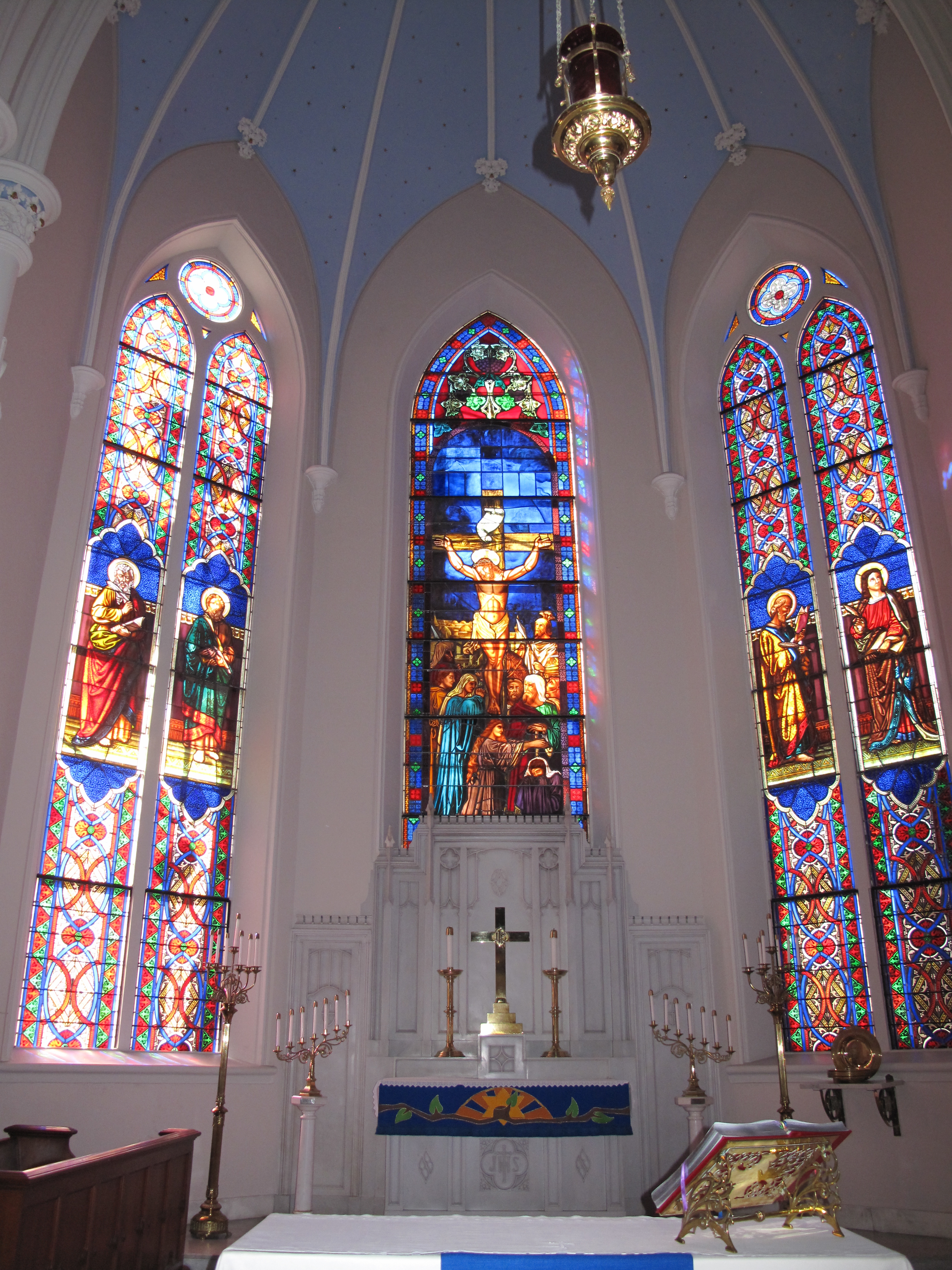
The chancel of St. Matthew's German Evangelical Lutheran Church in Charleston

Lutheran art consists of all religious art produced for Lutherans and the Lutheran churches. This includes sculpture, painting, and architecture. Artwork in the Lutheran churches arose as a distinct marker of the faith during the Reformation era and attempted to illustrate, supplement and portray in tangible form the teachings of Lutheran theology.

== Reformation era ==
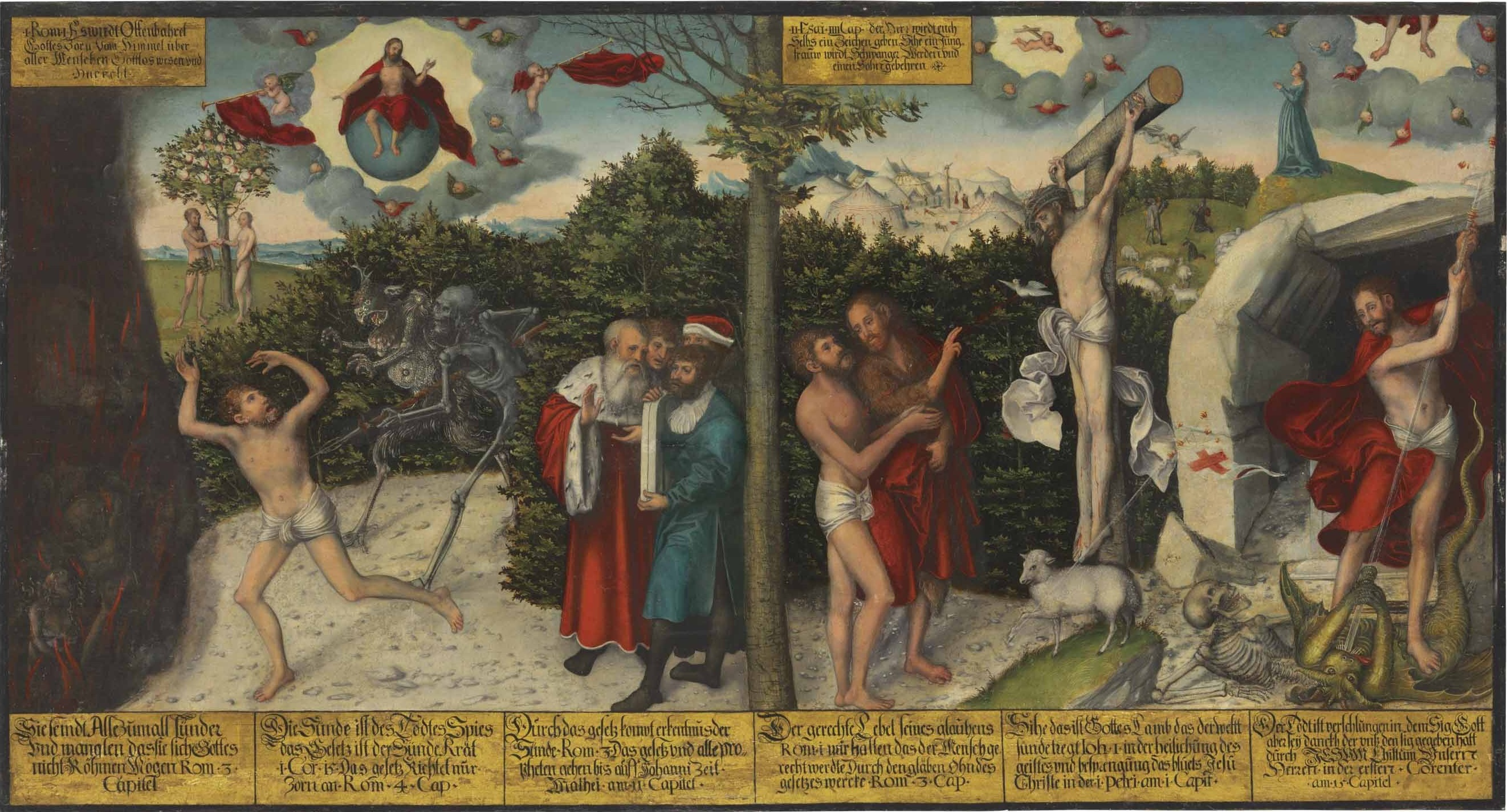
Law and Gospel, by Lutheran painter Lucas Cranach the Elder and Lucas Cranach the Younger (1536)

Martin Luther encouraged the display of some religious imagery in churches, seeing the Evangelical Lutheran Church as a continuation of the "ancient, apostolic church". He defended the use of "importance of images as tools for instruction and aids to devotion", stating that "If it is not a sin but good to have the image of Christ in my heart, why should it be a sin to have it in my eyes?"

His attitude towards images became more positive after his dispute with Andreas Karlstadt began in 1521. Luther had left Karlstadt in effective charge of his church in Wittenberg when he went into retreat in the Wartburg, but Karlstadt introduced a considerably more Radical Reformation than Luther approved, which included the removal of all religious images from churches. As with the later Calvinist programmes of complete destruction of images, this aroused more popular opposition than other aspects of the radical innovations, and Luther's support for images was in part an attempt to distinguish his positions from more radical ones, as well as an attempt to avoid stirring up opposition over an issue he did not see as central.

Luther also understood the value of crude polemical woodcuts in the propaganda battle, and commissioned some himself. He also appears to have worked personally with artists to develop didactic compositions that were used as book frontispieces, including for the Luther Bible which had an elaborate frontispiece in all early editions, prints, and relatively small versions in oils. Law and Gospel (1529) by the Lutheran painter Lucas Cranach the Elder is the earliest painting of this type, painted in different versions, and turned into a woodcut. Several share a similar composition, divided vertically into two by a tree, also found in many polemical prints; typically there is a good side and a bad side. Lutheran catechisms, an important means of disseminating Lutheran teachings among the congregations, were often illustrated with woodcuts, as were prayerbooks and other religious literature.

In the beginning of Lutheranism's spread to German territories in the 1520s and 1530s, local ordinances set out a variety of treatments of existing imagery in churches. Where, as was sometimes the case, nothing was said, it is presumed that it was intended that many images could be retained. In the Lutheran churches of Nuremberg, for example, "side altars, sacrament houses and saints' shrines provided (and continue to provide) the visual backdrop for evangelical worship". Elsewhere, depending on the views of the ruler or council, all images were to be removed, as in Hesse in 1526, although Martin Luther objected to this decision, apparently ineffectively. Some ordinances specified that only "images near and before which particular worship and idolatry and special honour with candles and lights have been practiced" should be removed but also emphasized that "we may not be iconoclasts", in the words of a Hamburg ordinance of 1529. In Brandenburg, an injunction was pronounced to retain 'altars...images and paintings' and in Württemberg, images that were neglected or damaged were restored or replaced. The Augsburg Interim and Leipzig Interim settled the issue, both pronouncing that sacred art would be preserved in the Lutheran Churches, though they would not be the focal point of worship, thus making the Lutheran position a via media between what Lutheran theologians perceived as 'Roman Catholic idolatry' and 'Calvinist iconoclasm'.

A few Lutheran altarpieces, including those of the Last Supper, were commissioned under the purview of Martin Luther. The Schneeberg Altarpiece was placed at the high altar of St. Wolfgang's Church, Schneeberg and as Lutheran sacred imagery, reflected "the devotional forms of fifteenth- and early sixteenth-century northern art". The Schneeberg Altarpiece (1539), along with the Wittenberg Altarpiece (1547) and the Weimar Altarpiece (1555), were Christocentric in their iconography and "these altarpieces reinforced the key teachings of the new church and helped consolidate a sense of confessional identity." In eastern Germany, Lutheran patrons erected some thirty new altarpieces. Most pre-Reformation altarpieces were preserved within Lutheran churches as the "altar was still believed to be a particularly holy place, and should be adorned accordingly."

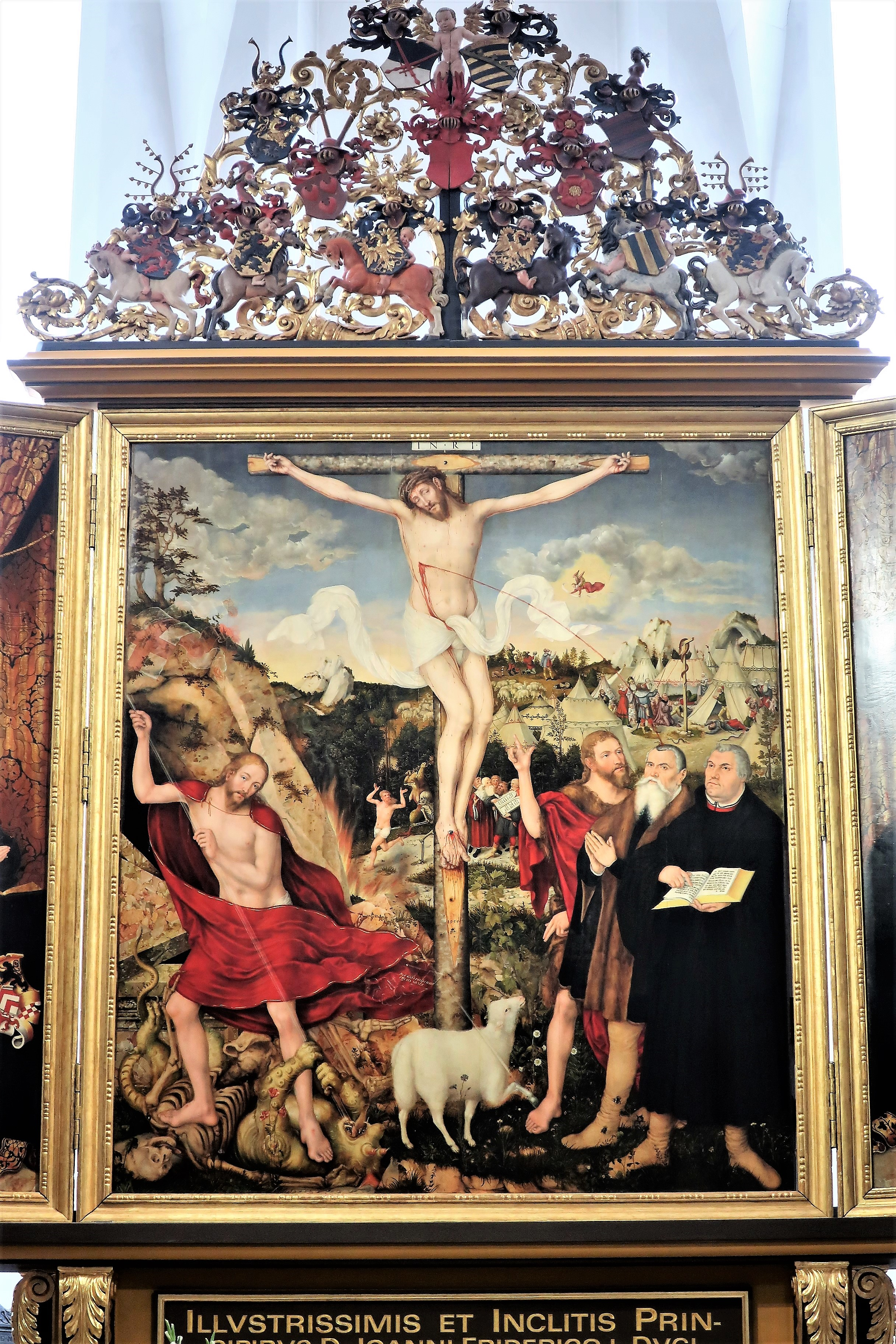
Altar panel of the Church of St. Peter and Paul in Weimar depicts the Crucifixion of Jesus with Lucas Cranach the Elder and Martin Luther standing on the right.

Lutheran sacred art gained a new function in addition to exciting one's mind to thoughts of the Divine by also serving a didactic purpose. Cranach's Law and Gospel, for example, "enshrines the specific authority of the word of the Bible by including biblical passages as prominent parts of the composition." Lutheranism was responsible for "an explosion of creativity in the graphic arts" with works such as Passional Christi und Antichristi by Philipp Melanchthon, being described as "richly illustrated".

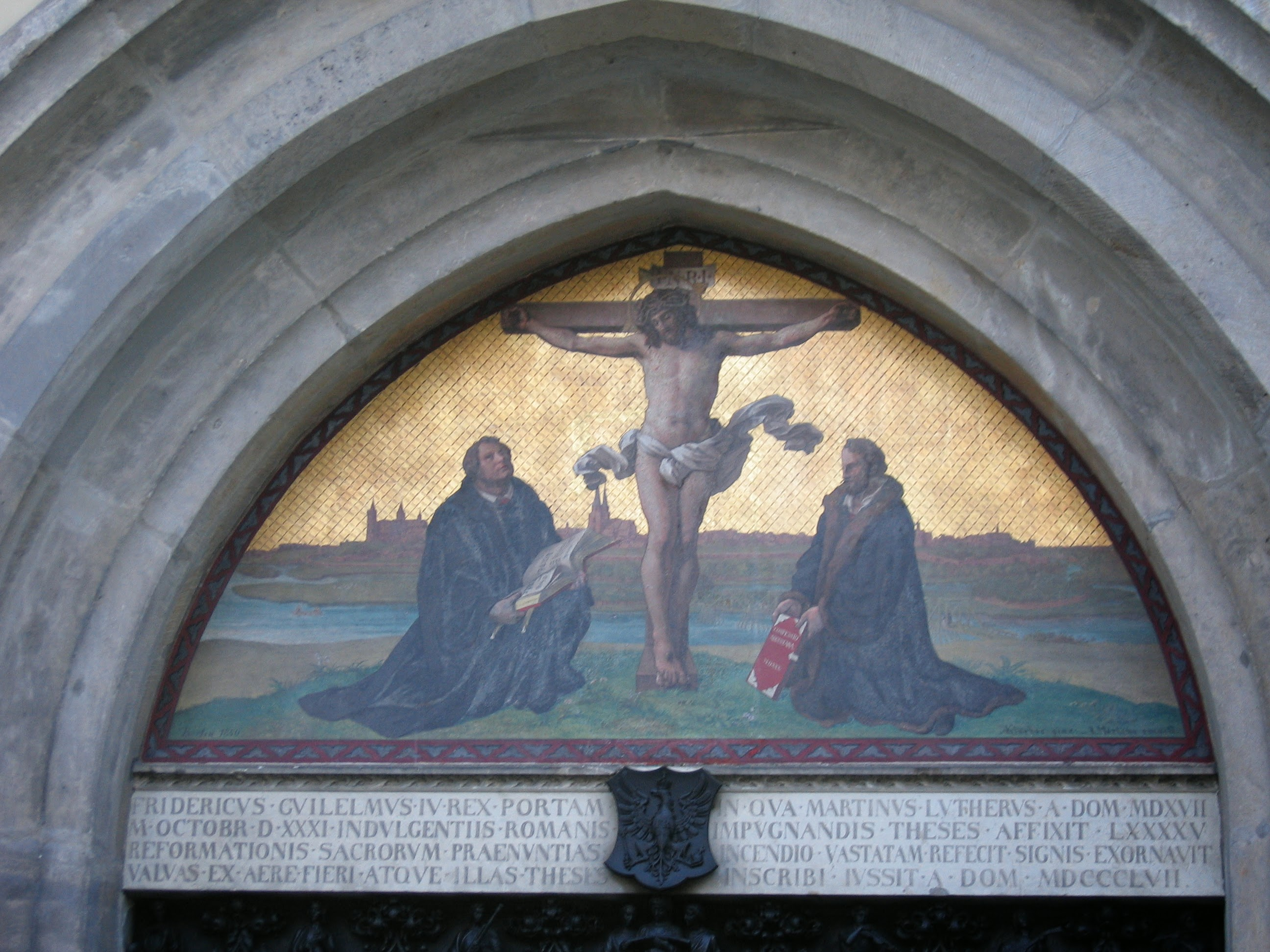
The tympanum of Thesis Door at the Castle Church in Wittenberg depicts Martin Luther and Philip Melanchthon kneeling in prayer, facing the crucified Christ.

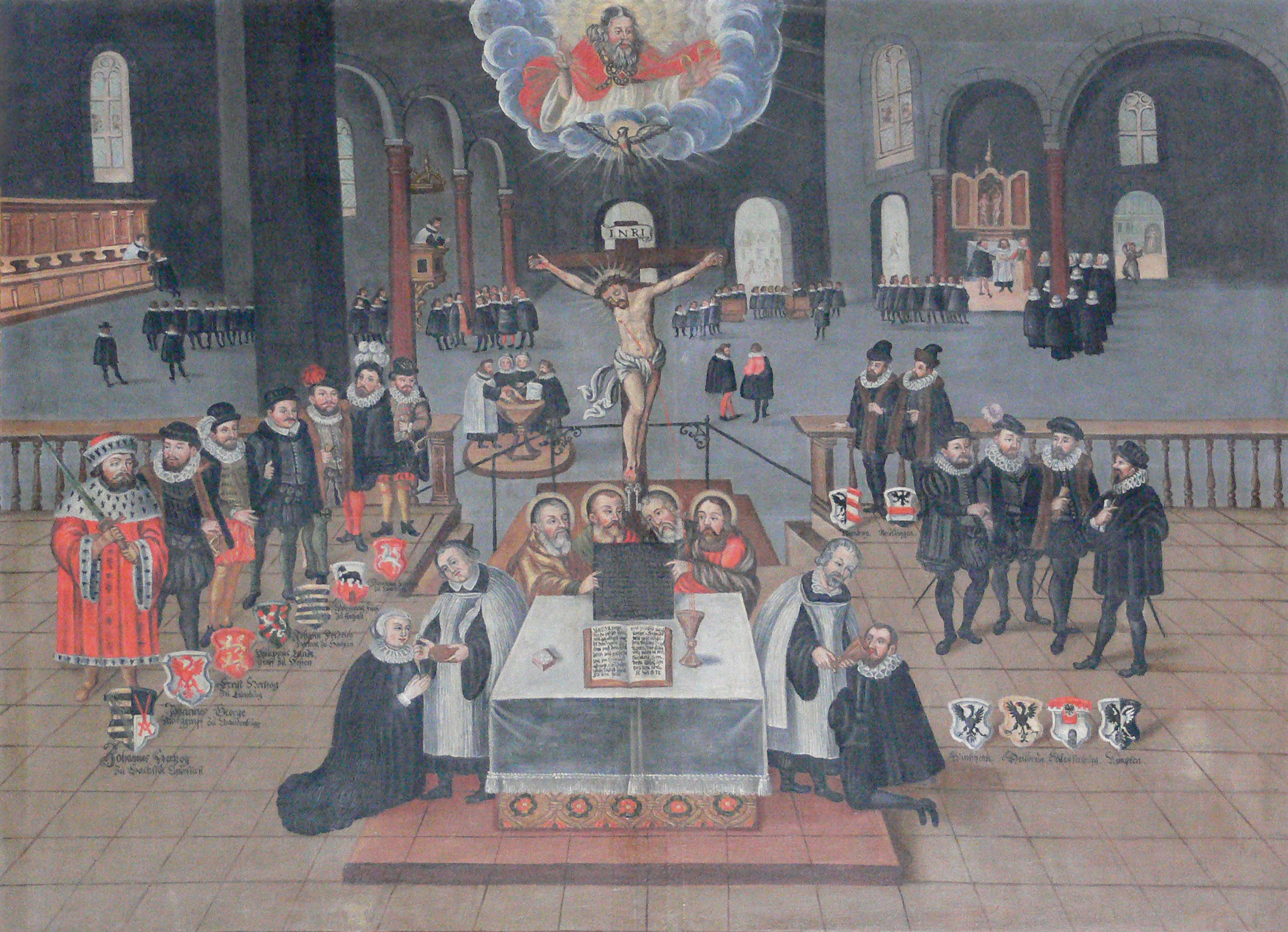
The Lutheran Mass depicted in the Nikolaikirche in Berlin, Martin Schulz, 1615

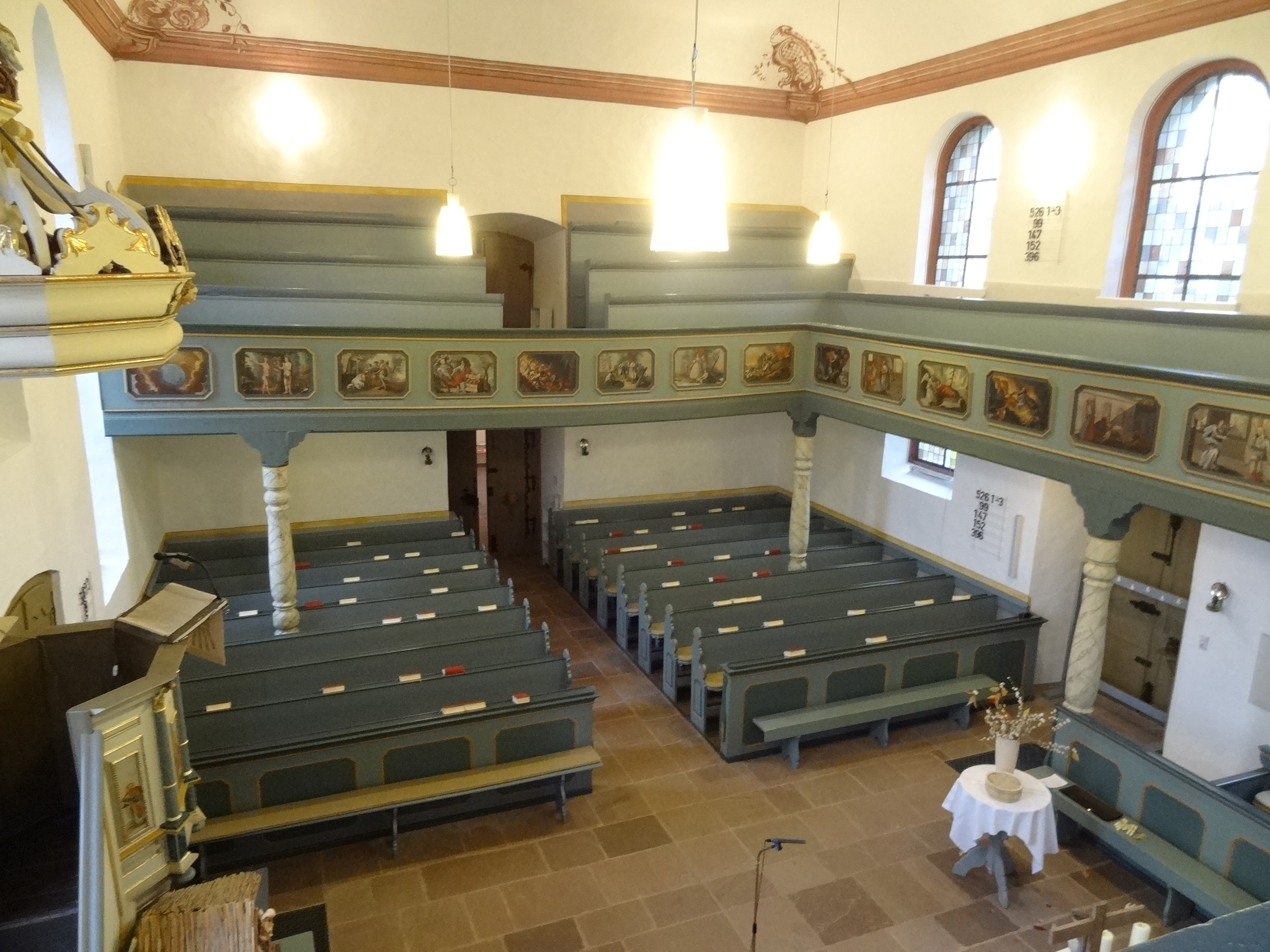
Daniel Hisgen's paintings are mostly cycles on the parapets of Lutheran church galleries. Here the Creation (left) to the Annunciation can be seen.

With respect to the Divine Service, "Lutheran worship became a complex ritual choreography set in a richly furnished church interior." Ornate church interiors in Lutheran churches reflected Lutheran Eucharistic theology, which taught the real presence of Christ in the Eucharist as a sacramental union. Lutheran churches, as well as homes, displayed a prominent crucifix as it highlighted their high view of the Theology of the Cross. It became a popular devotional image for Lutherans, who "prayed, meditated, and even wept before them." Thus, for Lutherans, "the Reformation renewed rather than removed the religious image."

During the Beeldenstorm or Iconoclastic Fury, bands often categorized as Calvinists violently removed sacred art from churches. Lutherans generally opposed the iconoclasm, one saying: "You black Calvinist, you give permission to smash our pictures and hack our crosses; we are going to smash you and your Calvinist priests in return". As such, Calvinist iconoclasm, "provoked reactive riots by Lutheran mobs" in Germany. Lutheran theologian and priest Johann Arndt was forced to flee Anhalt when it became Calvinist in the 1580s, due to his defense of Christian sacred art. He wrote a treatise Ikonographia, in which he criticized the Reformed faith for consecrating the Eucharistic elements on wooden tables rather than on stone altars. As Calvinism, along with its associated aniconism spread, "Lutherans responded by reaffirming their commitment to the proper use of religious images."

== Baroque period ==
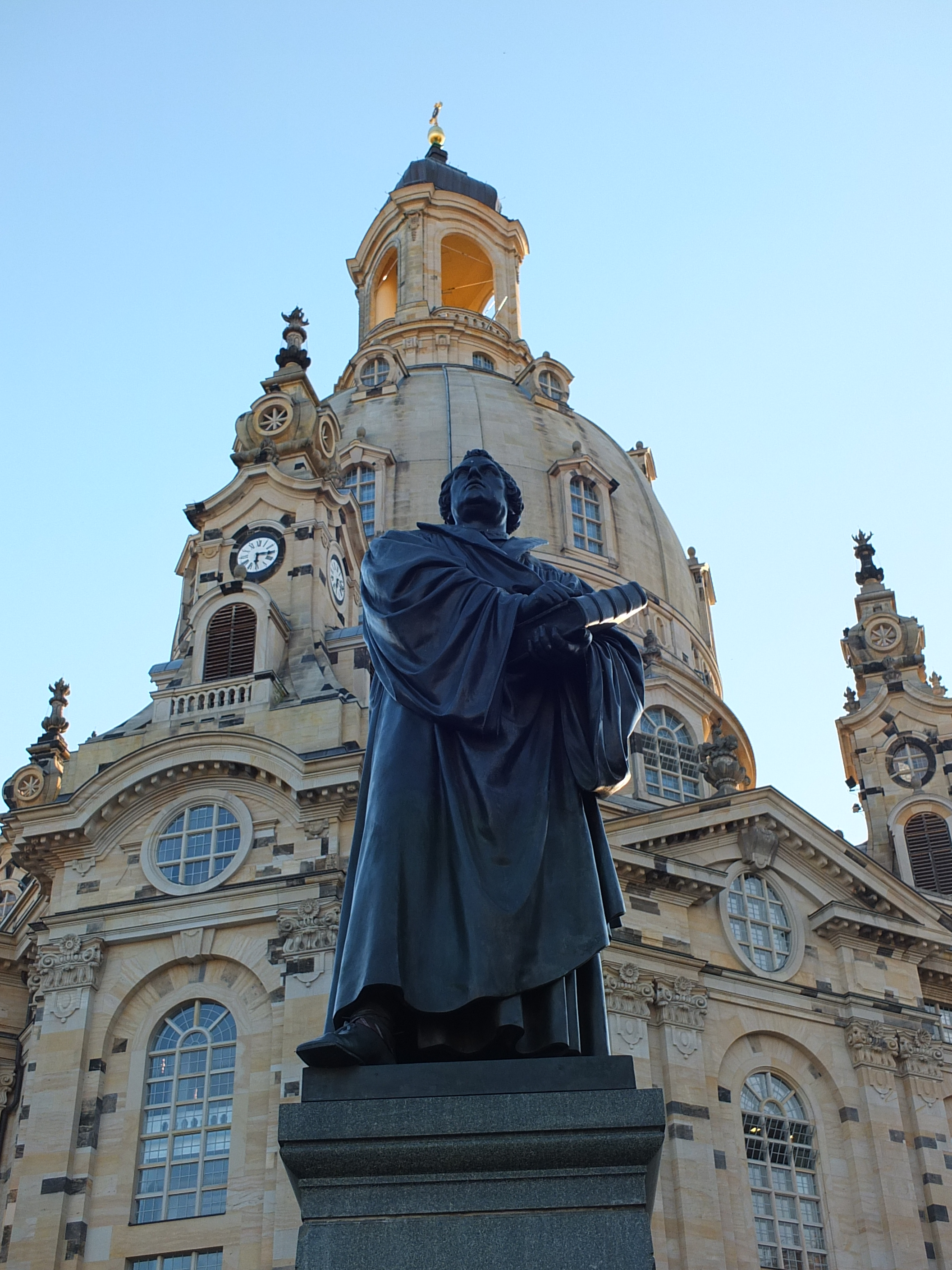
Bronze statue of Martin Luther, in front of the Lutheran Church of Our Lady in Dresden, by Adolf von Donndorf (1885).

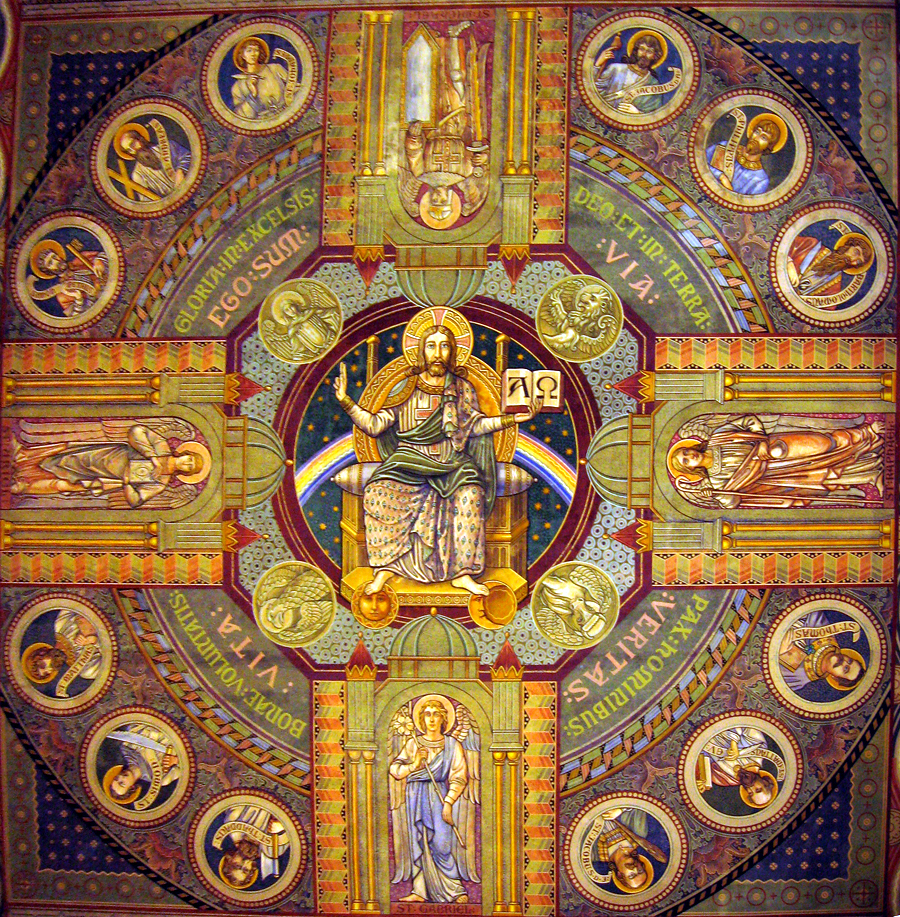
Lutheran Ascension Church at Empress Augusta Victoria Foundation, Jerusalem: Ceiling mosaic depicting Christ the Almighty

Artists who designed Lutheran Baroque art not only took their inspiration from Martin Luther, but from popular Lutheran piety in the latter part of the 16th and 17th centuries. The Dresden Frauenkirche serves as a prominent example of Lutheran Baroque art, which was completed in 1743 after being commissioned by the Lutheran city council of Dresden:

From the pulpit beside the entrance to the choir area the pure Word of God was preached against a truly magnificent visual backdrop. With its imposing high altar, showing in sculpted relief the emotive scene of Christ in prayer on the Mount of Olives, its splendid organ and its cupola with paintings of the evangelists and virtues by Giovanni Battista Grone, the interior of the Frauenkirche embraces illusion, even illusion dependent on the techniques of the Italian Baroque. The Frauenkirche rivalled contemporary Catholic churches in its beauty and splendour and was, in fact, compared by eighteenth-century observers to St. Peter's in Rome.

In the second half of the 17th century, High Baroque art continued to spread through Saxony, under the rule of Johann Georg II. Pieces like the altar of Johanneskirche resembled the Descent from the Cross by Peter Paul Rubens.

More typically, Daniel Hisgen (1733–1812) was a German painter of the rococo period who worked as a painter of Lutheran churches in Upper Hesse, specializing on cycles of paintings decorating the front of the gallery parapet in churches with an upper gallery. His discreet cycles demonstrate the modest prominence expected of Lutheran art in German churches of his day, taking a middle route between the large and prominent images in Catholic churches, and the complete absence of images in Calvinist ones.

== 19th century ==
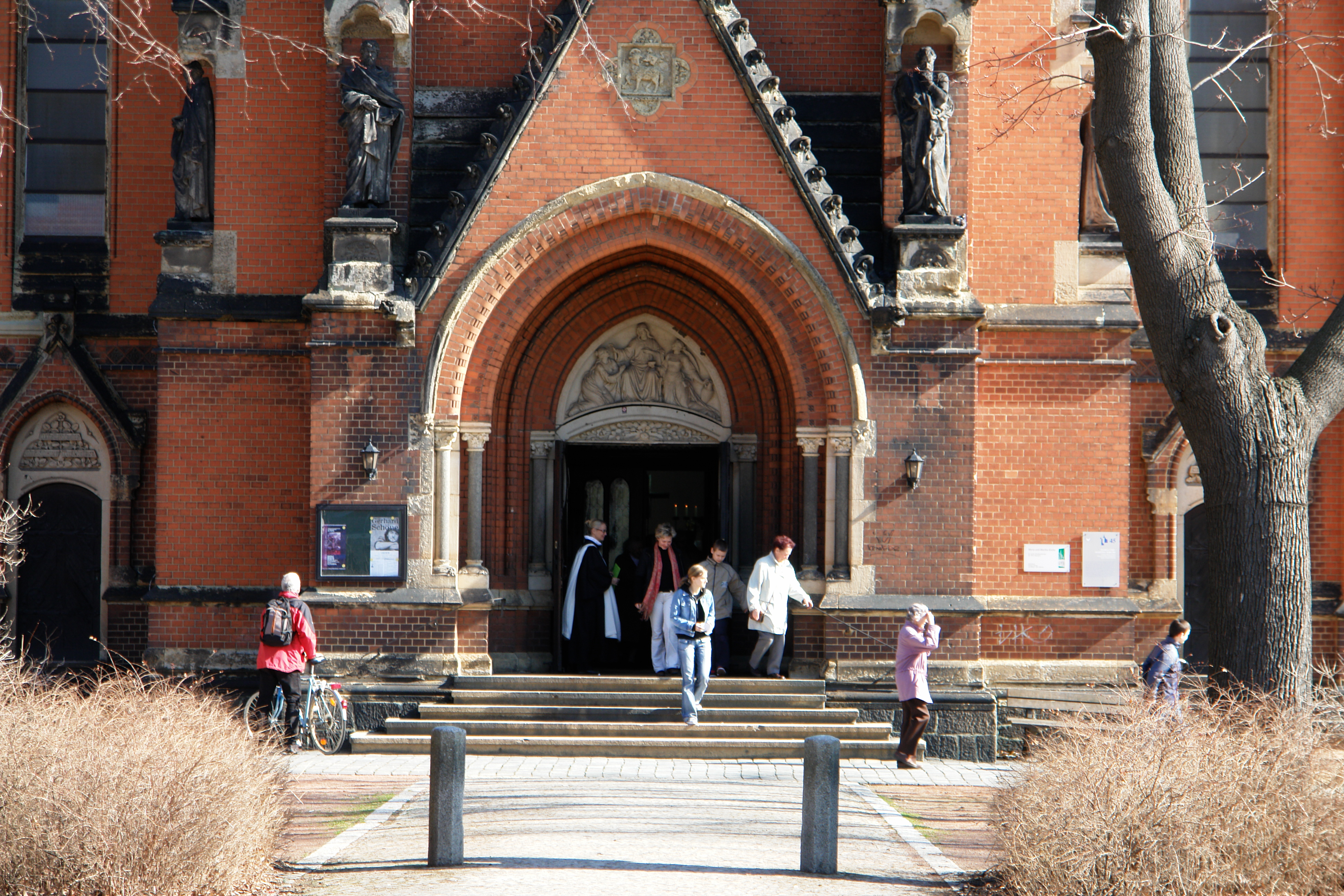
Sculpture around the entrance to a Gothic Revival Lutheran church in Bautzen, Saxony

In the Evangelical Lutheran Church in Denmark, several Lutheran altarpieces were designed and housed within parish churches. Many of these were designed by artists such as Carl Bloch and Joakim Skovgaard.

== Present day ==
With respect to artwork adorning Lutheran churches in the modern era:

Lutheran places of worship contain images and sculptures not only of Christ but also of biblical and occasionally of other saints as well as prominent decorated pulpits due to the importance of preaching, stained glass, ornate furniture, magnificent examples of traditional and modern architecture, carved or otherwise embellished altar pieces, and liberal use of candles on the altar and elsewhere.

In Finland, Hilkka Toivola produced many stained glass works in the 20th century. Within the Evangelical Lutheran Church in Denmark, religious artists including Arne Haugen Sørensen, Peter Brandes, Hein Heinsen and Maja Lisa Engelhardt continue to design Lutheran art today. It has been claimed that more pre-Reformation Marian altarpieces survive in German Lutheran churches than Catholic ones, where many were replaced in the Baroque period.

== Icons ==
In the Evangelical-Lutheran tradition, "icons’ functions are meant to express the theological teaching of the church and to be used as a reminder of such teachings." Icons are often placed on the home altars of Lutheran households to turn the mind toward God. A number of Evangelical-Lutheran churches have icons of Jesus, the Blessed Virgin Mary and other saints for devotional use:

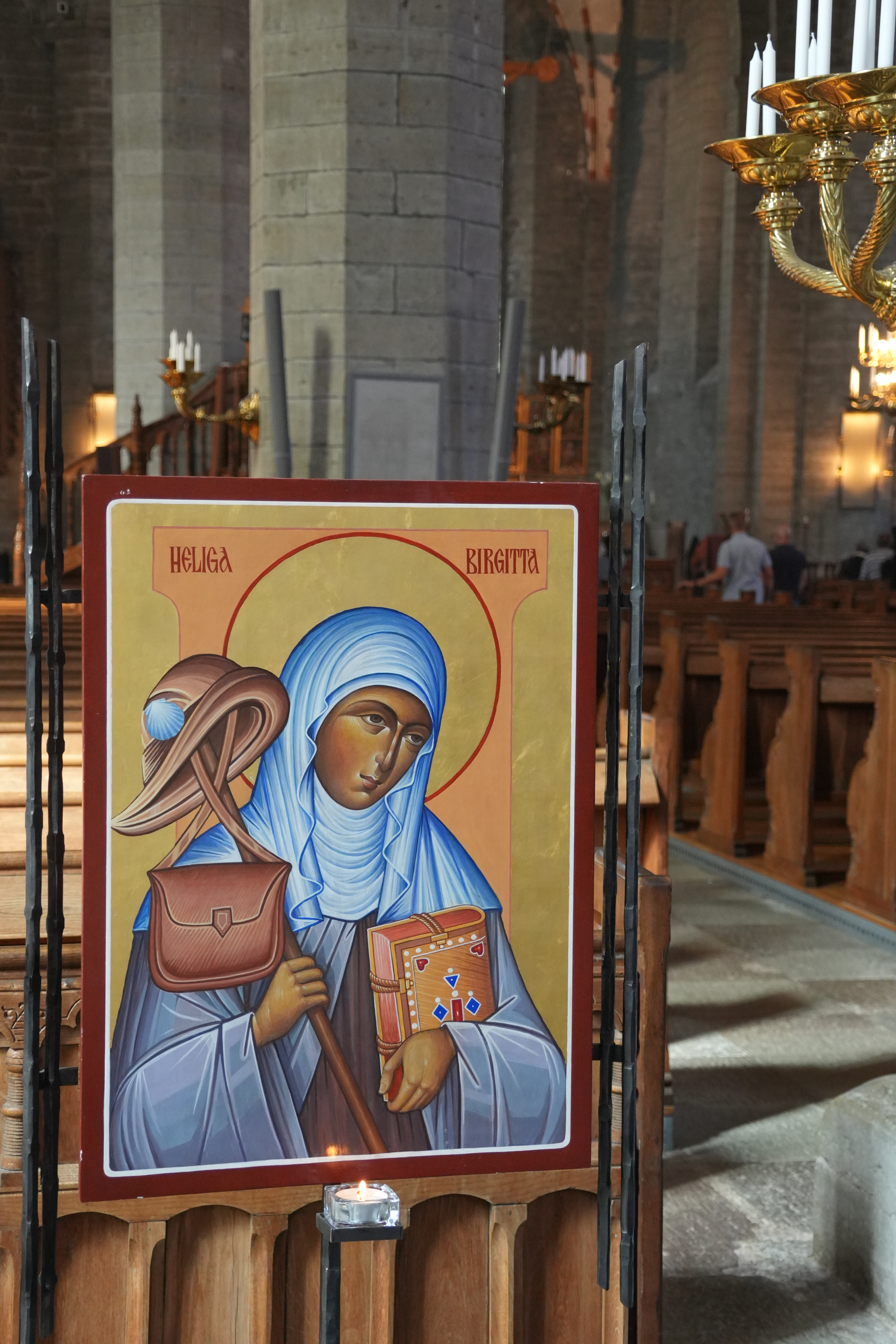
An Evangelical-Lutheran icon to St Bridget in Vadstena Abbey Church

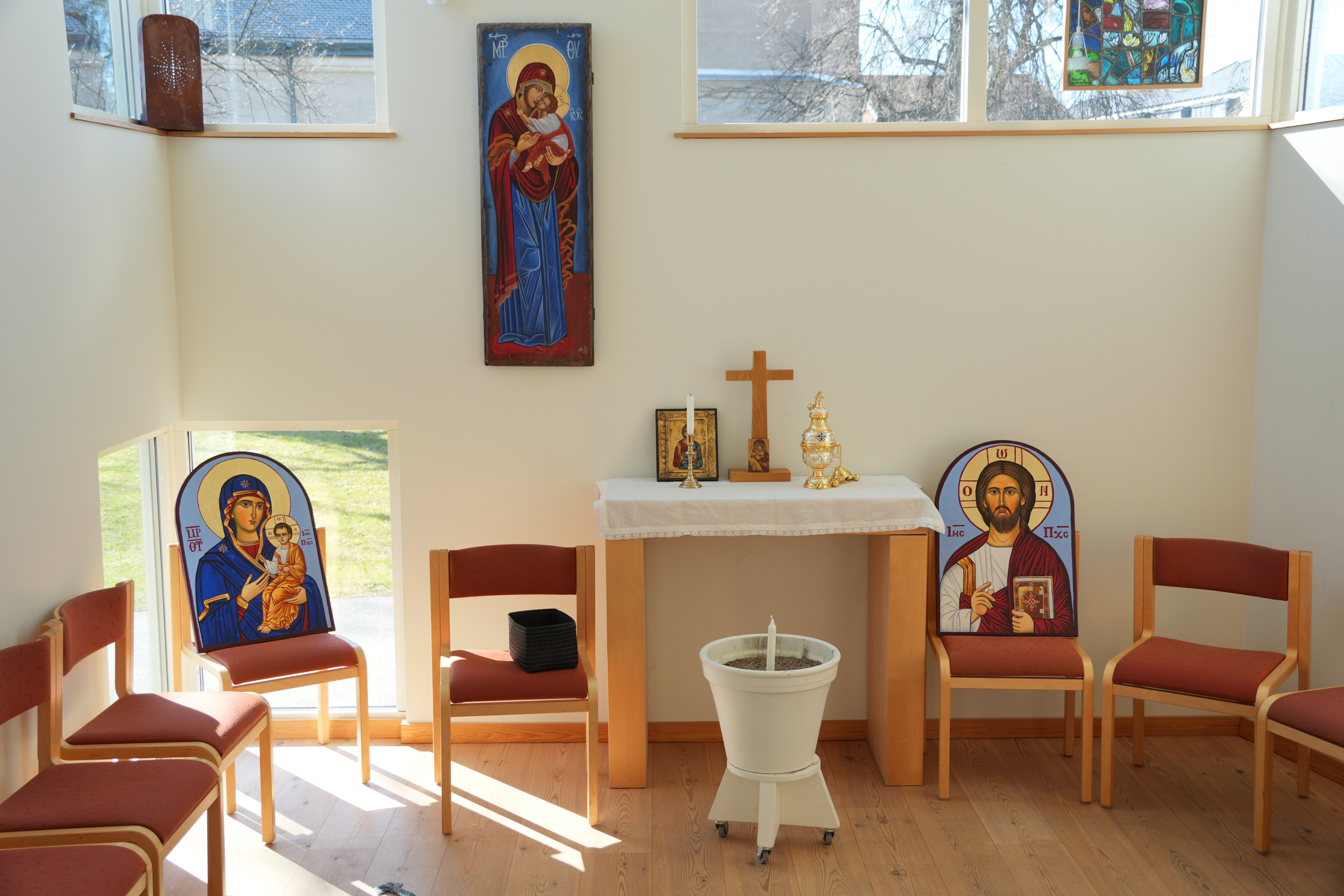
Icons surround the altar of the Lady Chapel of Norrtälje Evangelical-Lutheran Church in Sweden

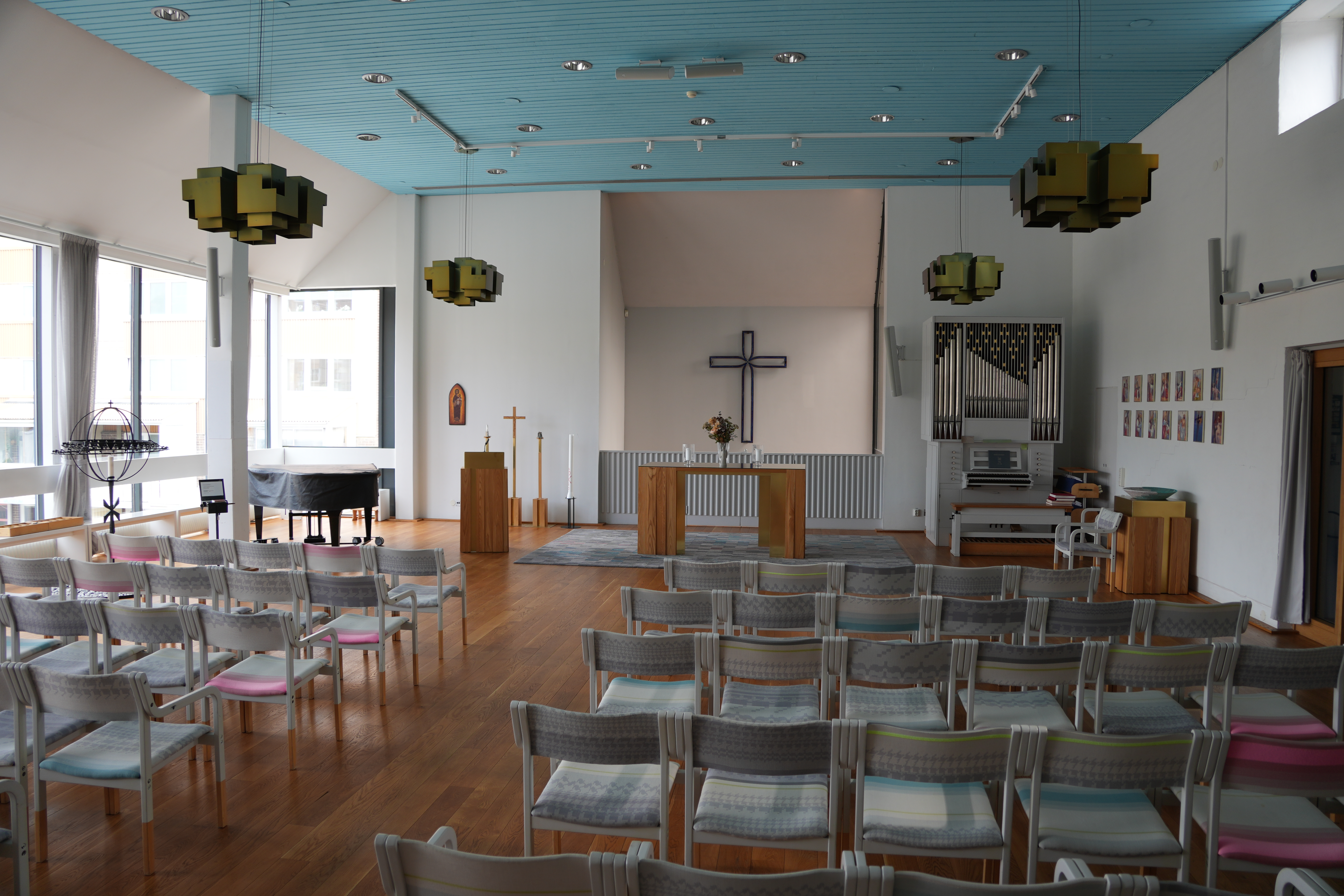
An icon of the Madonna and child at Fisksätra Church in Saltsjöbaden, Sweden

Icons at Saint Thomas Church (Evangelical-Lutheran) in Vällingby, Sweden

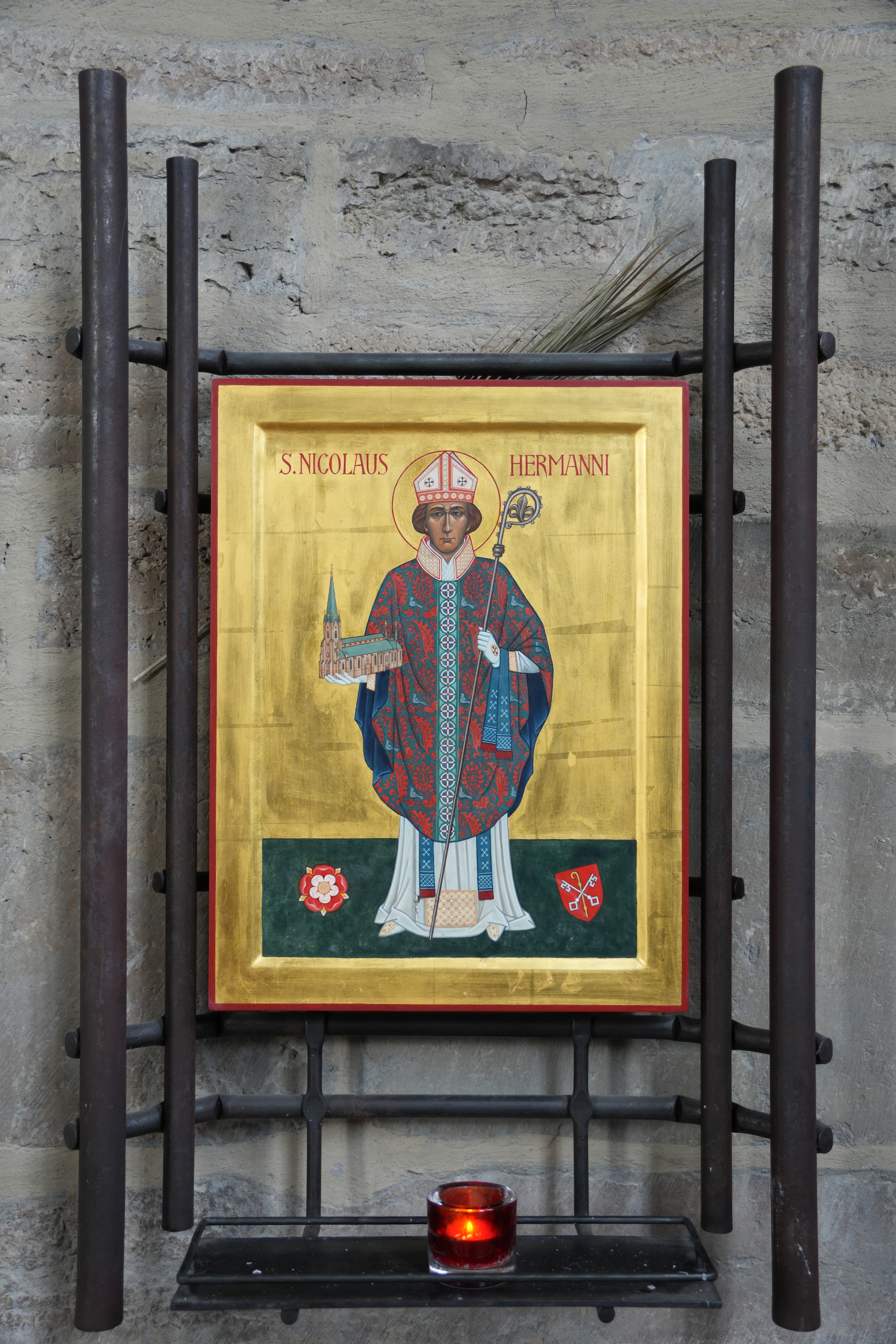
An icon of Saint Nicolaus Hermanni in Linköping Cathedral (Evangelical Lutheran) in Sweden

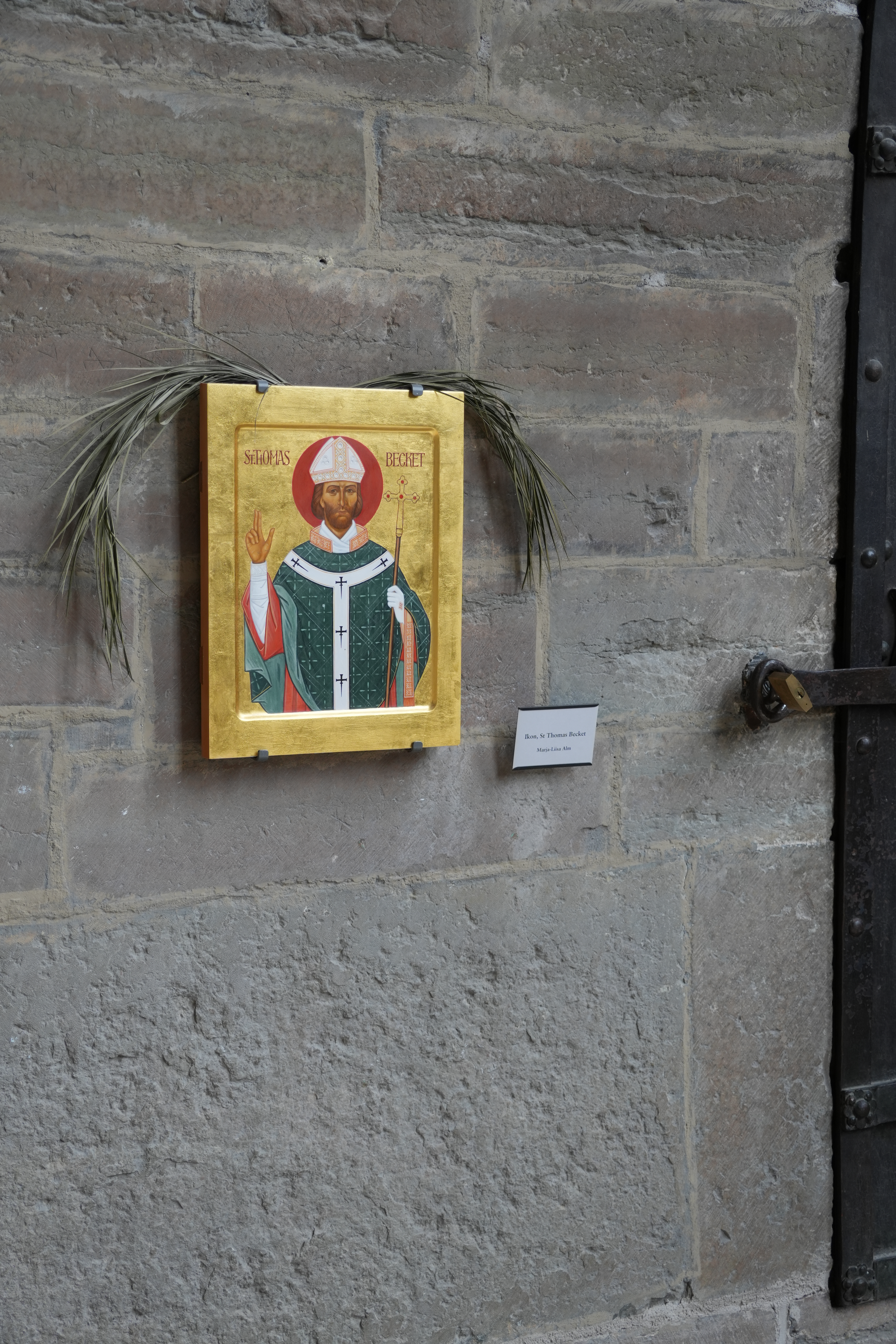
An icon of St Thomas Becket in Linköping Cathedral (Evangelical Lutheran) in Sweden

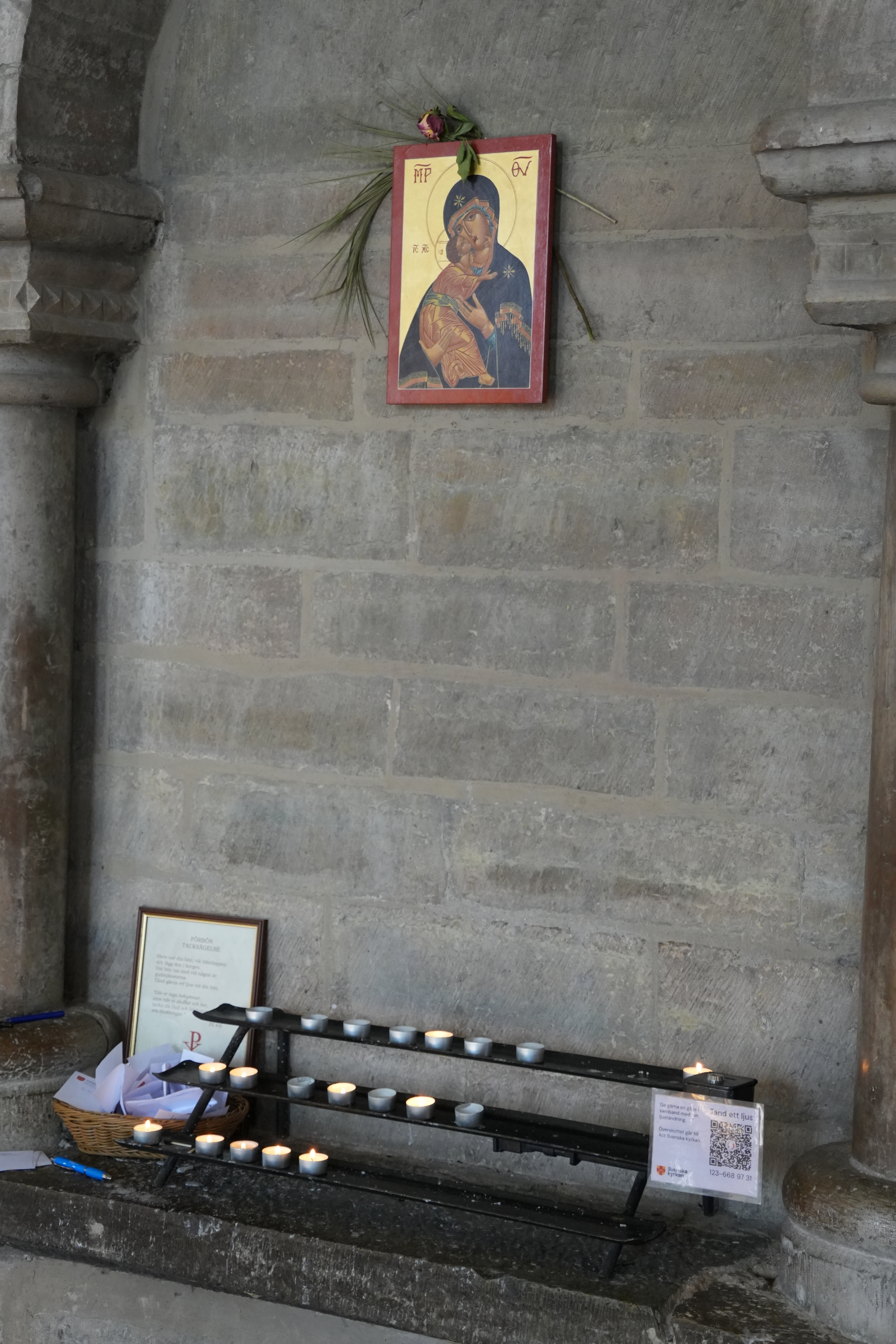
An icon of the Blessed Virgin Mary with votive candle rack in Linköping Cathedral (Evangelical Lutheran) in Sweden

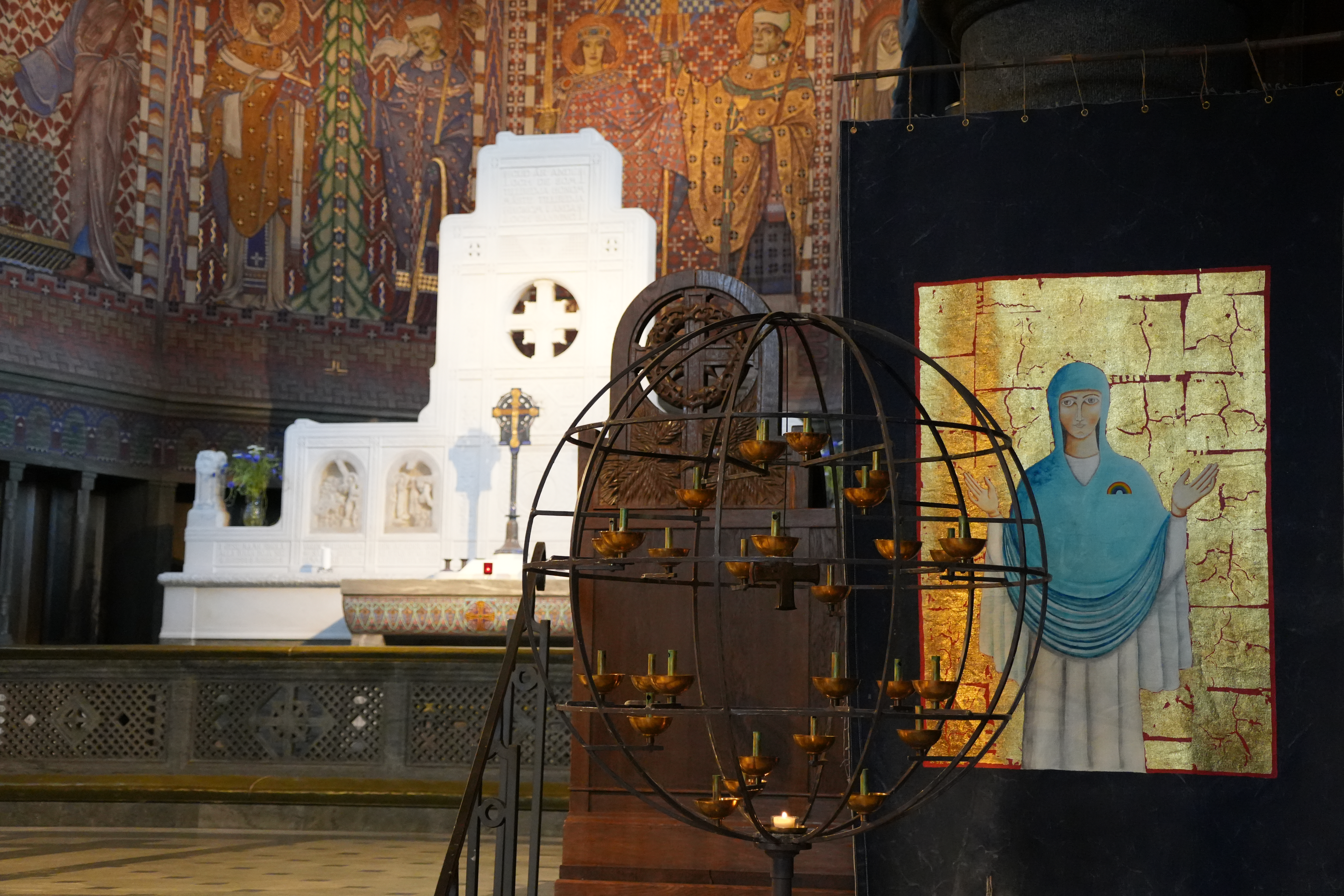
An icon the Blessed Virgin Mary with votive candle rack in the Evangelical-Lutheran Church of the Revelation in Sweden

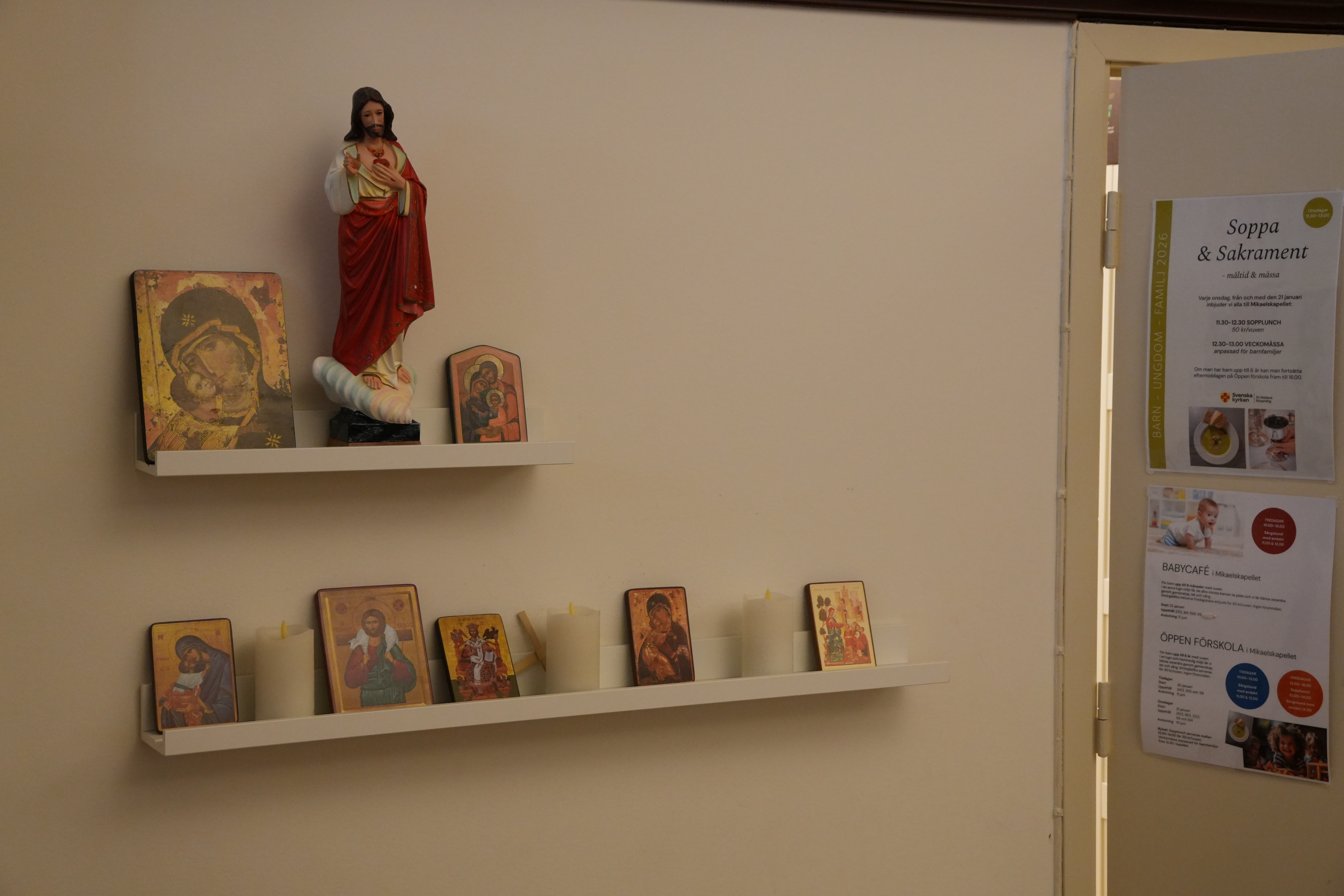
Icons in Saint Michael's Chapel, located in St. Matthew's Church, Stockholm

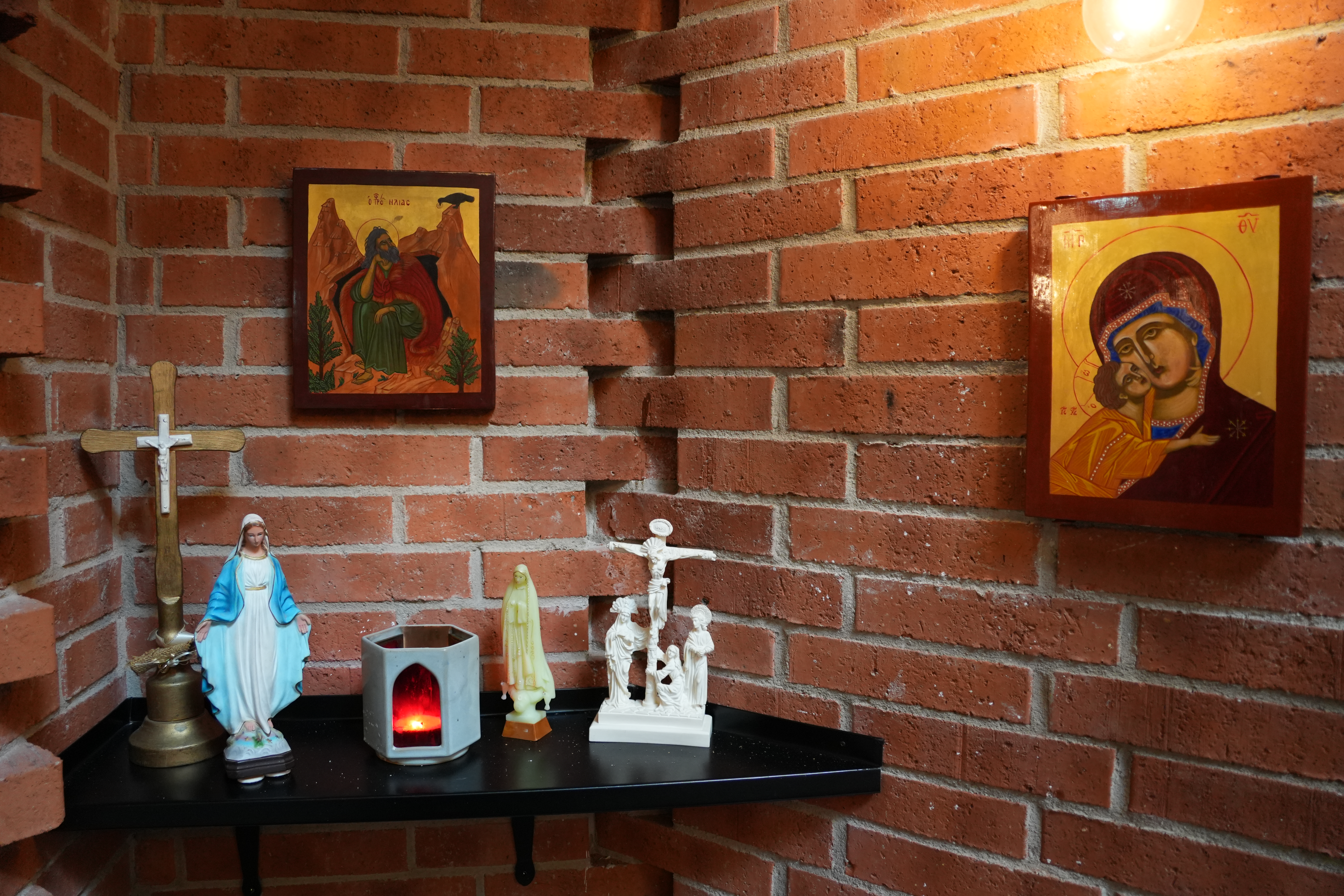
Icons in Kista Church (Evangelical Lutheran) in Kista, Sweden

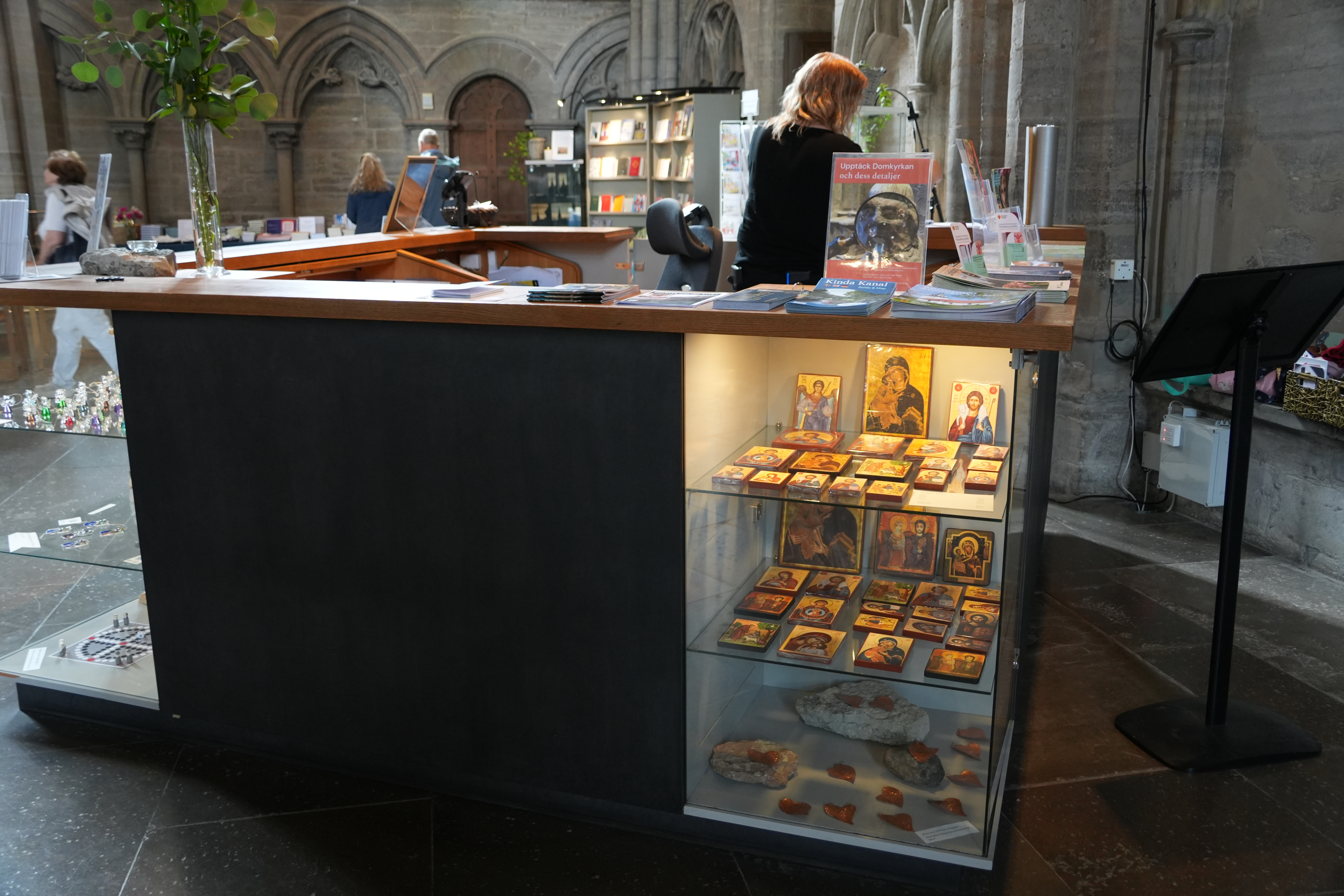
A religious goods store at Linköping Cathedral (Evangelical-Lutheran) with icons

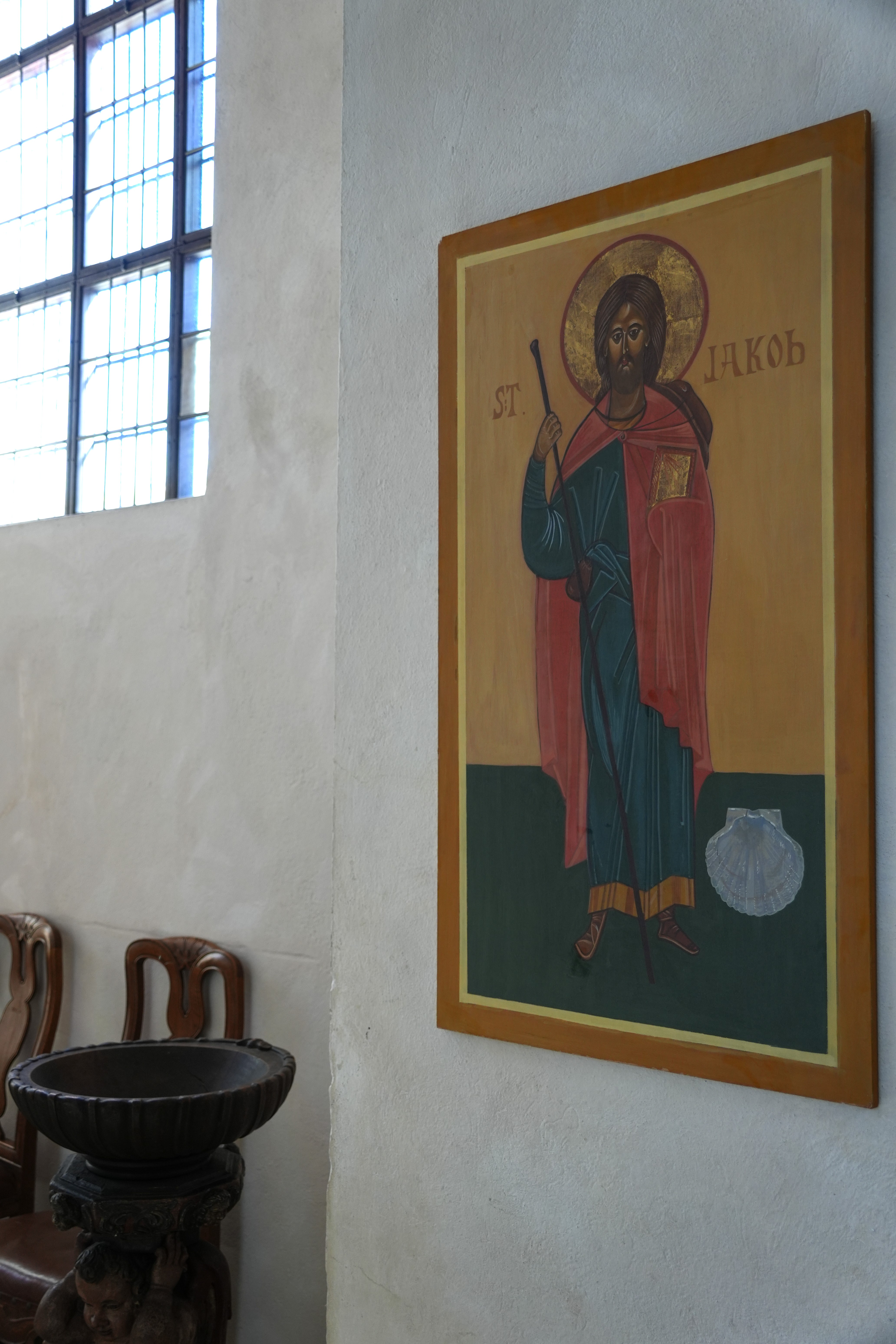
A holy water font next to an icon of Saint James the Great at Saint James's Church (Evangelical-Lutheran) in Stockholm

Icons near the tabernacle of Vadstena Abbey Church (Evangelical-Lutheran) in Vättern, Sweden

An Evangelical-Lutheran icon of the crucifixion of Jesus, containing the Wreath of Christ, the set of Evangelical-Lutheran prayer beads (at Vadstena Abbey Church)

Icons behind the immersion baptismal font at Saint Thomas Church (Evangelical-Lutheran) in Vällingby, Sweden

An icon of Christ Pantocrator in the side chapel of Saint Thomas Church (Evangelical-Lutheran) in Vällingby, Sweden

== See also ==
- Art in the Protestant Reformation and Counter-Reformation
- Pulpit altar
- Schneeberg Altarpiece
- Wittenberg Altarpiece
- Weimar Altarpiece
- Gotha Altarpiece
- Drothem Church

== Works cited ==
- Heal, Bridget (2017), A Magnificent Faith: Art and Identity in Lutheran Germany, Oxford University Press, 2017, ISBN 0191057541, 9780191057540, google books
- Lamport, Mark A. (31 August 2017). Encyclopedia of Martin Luther and the Reformation. Rowman & Littlefield Publishers. ISBN 9781442271593.
- Noble, Bonnie (2009). Lucas Cranach the Elder: Art and Devotion of the German Reformation. University Press of America. ISBN 978-0-7618-4337-5.
