= Art in the Protestant Reformation and Counter-Reformation =

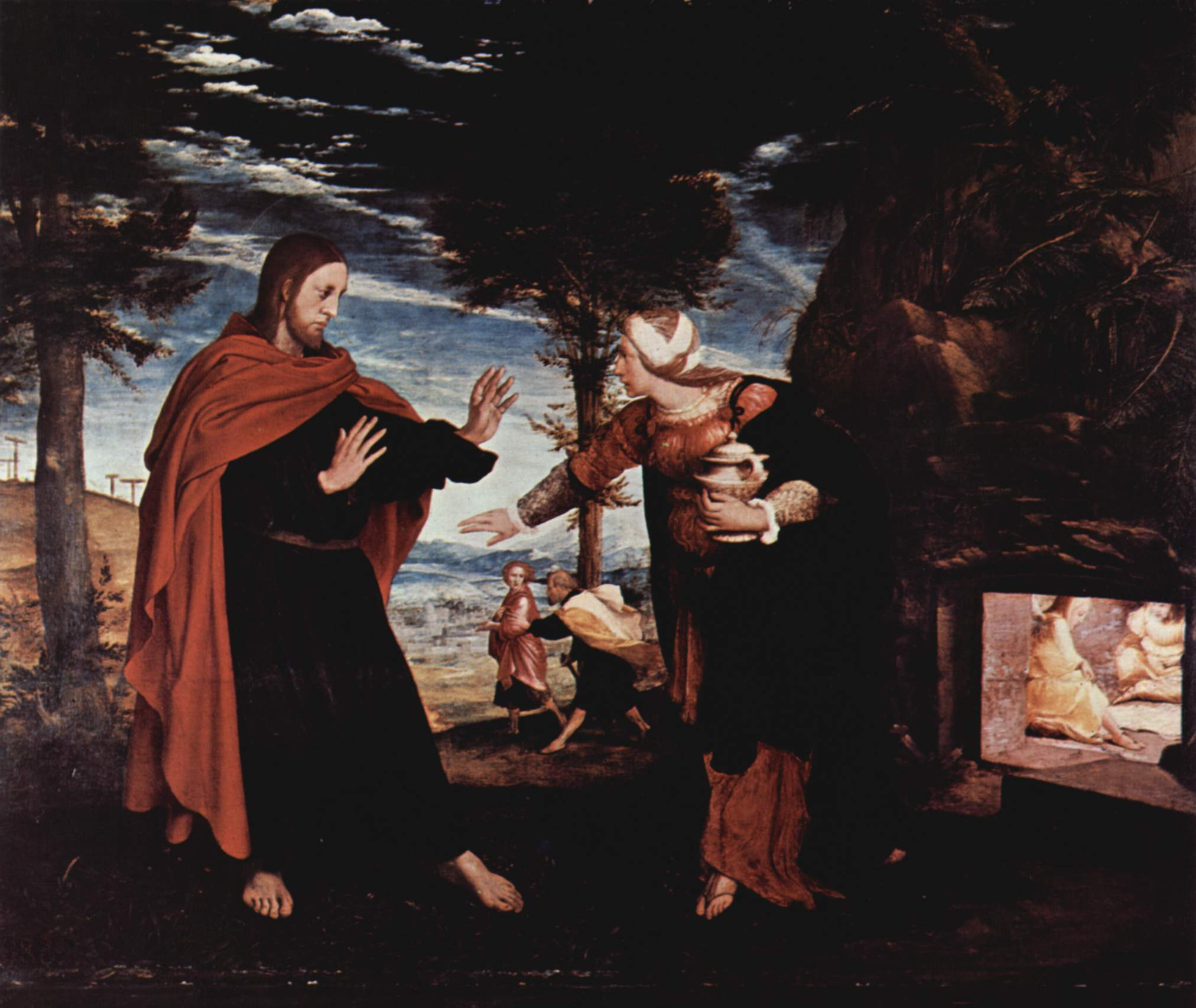
Hans Holbein the Younger's Noli me tangere a relatively rare Protestant oil painting of Christ from the Reformation period. It is small, and generally naturalistic in style, avoiding iconic elements like the halo, which is barely discernible.

The Protestant Reformation during the 16th century in Europe almost entirely rejected the existing tradition of Catholic art, and very often destroyed as much of it as it could reach. A new artistic tradition developed, producing far smaller quantities of art that followed Protestant agendas and diverged drastically from the southern European tradition and the humanist art produced during the High Renaissance. The Lutheran churches, as they developed, accepted a limited role for larger works of art in churches, and also encouraged prints and book illustrations. Calvinists remained steadfastly opposed to art in churches, and suspicious of small printed images of religious subjects, though generally fully accepting secular images in their homes.

In turn, the Catholic Counter-Reformation both reacted against and responded to Protestant criticisms of art in Roman Catholicism to produce a more stringent style of Catholic art. Protestant religious art both embraced Protestant values and assisted in the proliferation of Protestantism, but the amount of religious art produced in Protestant countries was hugely reduced. Artists in Protestant countries diversified into secular forms of art like history painting, landscape painting, portrait painting and still life.

== Art and the Reformation ==
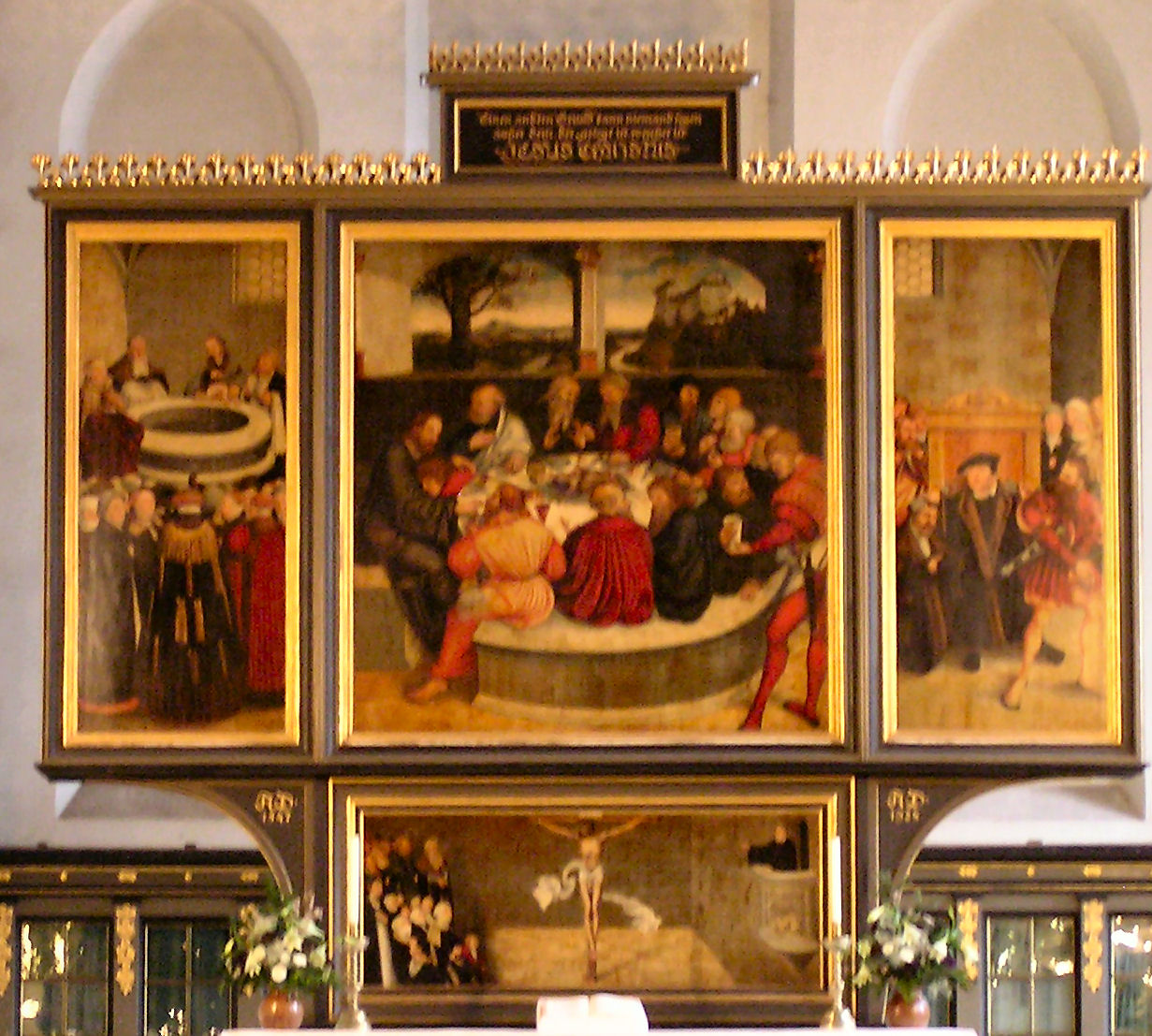
Cranach the Elder's Wittenberg Altarpiece. An early Lutheran work depicting leading Reformers as Apostles at the Last Supper.

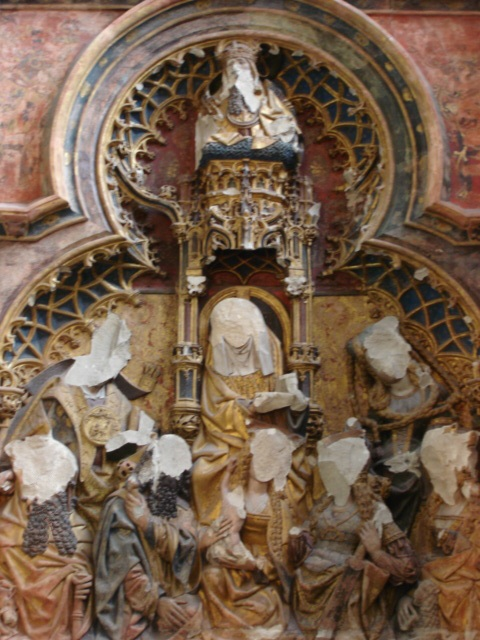
Altar piece in St. Martin's Cathedral, Utrecht, attacked by Calvinists in the Beeldenstorm in 1566. This retable became visible again after restoration in 1919 removed the false wall placed in front of it.

The Protestant Reformation was a religious movement that occurred in Western Europe during the 16th century that resulted in a divide in Christianity between Roman Catholics and Protestants. This movement "created a North-South split in Europe, where generally Northern countries became Protestant, while Southern countries remained Catholic."

The Reformation produced two main branches of Protestantism; one was the Evangelical Lutheran churches, which followed the teachings of Martin Luther, and the other the Reformed churches, which followed the ideas of John Calvin and Huldrych Zwingli. Out of these branches grew three main sects, the Lutheran tradition, as well as the Continental Reformed and Anglican traditions, the latter two following the Reformed (Calvinist) faith. Lutherans and Reformed Christians had different views regarding religious imagery.

Martin Luther in Germany allowed and encouraged the display of a restricted range of religious imagery in churches, seeing the Evangelical Lutheran Church as a continuation of the "ancient, apostolic church". The use of images was one of the issues where Luther strongly opposed the more radical Andreas Karlstadt. For a few years Lutheran altarpieces like the Last Supper by the younger Cranach were produced in Germany, especially by Luther's friend Lucas Cranach, to replace Catholic ones, often containing portraits of leading reformers as the apostles or other protagonists, but retaining the traditional depiction of Jesus. As such, "Lutheran worship became a complex ritual choreography set in a richly furnished church interior." The Wittenberg Altarpiece, Schneeberg Altarpiece, Weimar Altarpiece and Gotha Altarpiece are important examples of the relatively small number of attempts to continue the tradition of the altarpiece giving an explicitly Lutheran interpretation. This phase was mostly finished by 1555.

Lutherans continued the use of the crucifix as it highlighted their high view of the Theology of the Cross. Stories grew up of "indestructible" images of Luther, that had survived fires, by divine intervention. Thus, for Lutherans, "the Reformation renewed rather than removed the religious image."

On the other hand, there was a wave of iconoclasm, or the destruction of religious imagery. This began very early in the Reformation, when students in Erfurt destroyed a wooden altar in the Franciscan friary in December 1521. Later, Reformed Christianity showed consistent hostility to religious images, as idolatry, especially sculpture and large paintings. Book illustrations and prints were more acceptable, because they were smaller and more private. Reformed leaders, especially Huldrych Zwingli and John Calvin, actively eliminated imagery from churches within the control of their followers, and regarded the great majority of religious images as idolatrous. Early Calvinists were even suspicious of portraits of clergy; Christopher Hales (soon to be one of the Marian exiles) tried to have portraits of six divines sent to him from Zurich, and felt it necessary to explain his motives in a letter of 1550: "this is not done ....with a view to making idols of you; they are desired for the reasons which I have mentioned, and not for the sake of honour or veneration".

The destruction was often extremely divisive and traumatic within communities, an unmistakable physical manifestation, often imposed from above, that could not be ignored. It was just for this reason that reformers favoured a single dramatic coup, and many premature acts in this line sharply increased subsequent hostility between Catholics and Calvinists in communities – for it was generally at the level of the city, town or village that such actions occurred, except in England and Scotland.

But reformers often felt impelled by strong personal convictions, as shown by the case of Frau Göldli, on which Zwingli was asked to advise. She was a Swiss lady who had once made a promise to Saint Apollinaris that if she recovered from an illness she would donate an image of the saint to a local convent, which she did. Later she turned Protestant, and feeling she must reverse what she now saw as a wrong action, she went to the convent church, removed the statue and burnt it. Prosecuted for blasphemy, she paid a small fine without complaint, but flatly refused to pay the additional sum the court ordered be paid to the convent to replace the statue, putting her at risk of serious penalties. Zwingli's letter advised trying to pay the nuns a larger sum on condition they did not replace the statue, but the eventual outcome is unknown. By the end of his life, after iconoclastic shows of force became a feature of the early phases of the French Wars of Religion, even Calvin became alarmed and criticised them, realizing that they had become counter-productive.

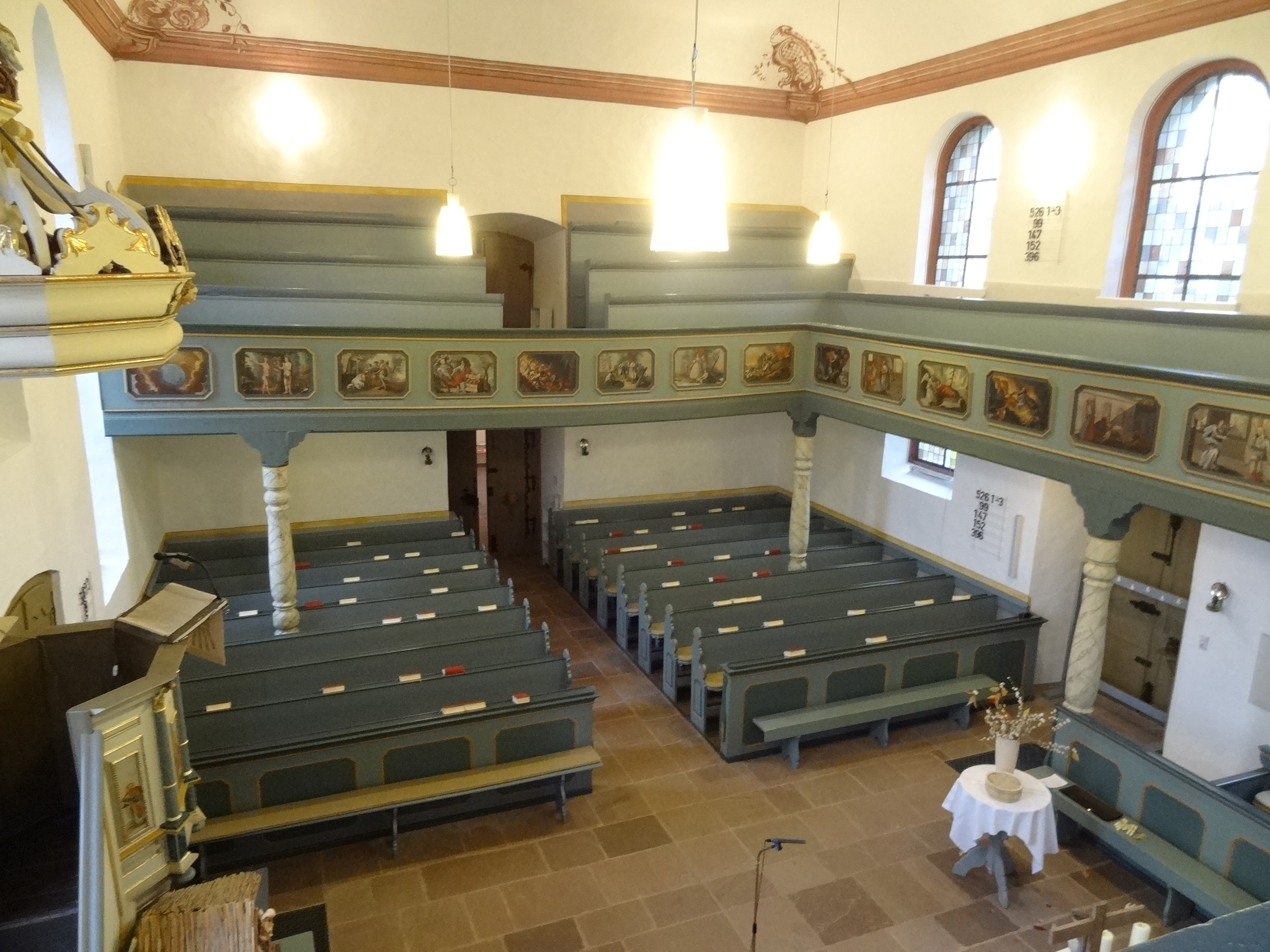
Daniel Hisgen's paintings are mostly cycles on the parapets of Lutheran church galleries. Here the Creation (left) to the Annunciation can be seen.

Subjects prominent in Catholic art other than Jesus and events in the Bible, such as Mary and saints were given much less emphasis or disapproved of in Protestant theology. As a result, in much of northern Europe, the Church virtually ceased to commission figurative art, placing the dictation of content entirely in the hands of the artists and lay consumers. Calvinism even objected to non-religious funerary art, such as the heraldry and effigies beloved of the Renaissance rich. Where there was religious art, iconic images of Christ and scenes from the Passion became less frequent, as did portrayals of the saints and clergy. Narrative scenes from the Bible, especially as book illustrations and prints, and, later, moralistic depictions of modern life were preferred. Both Cranachs painted allegorical scenes setting out Lutheran doctrines, in particular a series on Law and Gospel. Daniel Hisgen, a German Rococo painter of the 18th century in Upper Hesse, specialized in cycles of biblical paintings decorating the front of the gallery parapet in Lutheran churches with an upper gallery, a less prominent position that satisfied Lutheran scruples. Wooden organ cases were also often painted with similar scenes to those in Catholic churches.

Lutherans strongly defended their existing sacred art from a new wave of Calvinist-on-Lutheran iconoclasm in the second half of the century, as Calvinist rulers or city authorities attempted to impose their will on Lutheran populations in the "Second Reformation" of about 1560–1619. Against the Reformed, Lutherans exclaimed: "You black Calvinist, you give permission to smash our pictures and hack our crosses; we are going to smash you and your Calvinist priests in return". The Beeldenstorm, a large and very disorderly wave of Calvinist mob destruction of Catholic images and church fittings that spread through the Low Countries in the summer of 1566 was the largest outbreak of this sort, with drastic political repercussions. This campaign of Calvinist iconoclasm "provoked reactive riots by Lutheran mobs" in Germany and "antagonized the neighbouring Eastern Orthodox" in the Baltic region. Similar patterns to the German actions, but with the addition of encouragement and sometimes finance from the national government, were seen in Anglican England in the English Civil War and English Commonwealth in the next century, when more damage was done to art in medieval parish churches than during the English Reformation.

A major theological difference between Protestantism and Catholicism is the question of transubstantiation, or the literal transformation of the Communion wafer and wine into the body and blood of Christ, though both Lutheran and Reformed Christians affirmed the real presence of Christ in the Eucharist, the former as a sacramental union and the latter as a pneumatic presence. Protestant churches that were not participating in the iconoclasm often selected as altarpieces scenes depicting the Last Supper. This helped the worshippers to recall their theology behind the Eucharist, as opposed to Catholic churches, which often chose crucifixion scenes for their altarpieces to remind the worshippers that the sacrifice of Christ and the sacrifice of the Mass were one and the same, via the literal transformation of the Eucharist.

The Protestant Reformation also capitalized on the popularity of printmaking in northern Europe. Printmaking allowed images to be mass-produced and widely available to the public at low cost. This allowed for the widespread availability of visually persuasive imagery. The Protestant church was therefore able, as the Catholic Church had been doing since the early 15th century, to bring their theology to the people, and religious education was brought from the church into the homes of the common people, thereby forming a direct link between the worshippers and the divine.

There was also a violent propaganda war fought partly with popular prints by both sides; these were often highly scurrilous caricatures of the other side and their doctrines. On the Protestant side, portraits of the leading reformers were popular, and their likenesses sometimes represented the Apostles and other figures in Biblical scenes such as the Last Supper.

== Genre and landscape ==
After the early years of the reformation, artists in Protestant areas painted far fewer religious subjects for public display, although there was a conscious effort to develop a Protestant iconography of Bible illustration in book illustrations and prints. In the early Reformation artists, especially Cranach the Elder and Younger and Holbein, made paintings for churches showing the leaders of the reformation in ways very similar to Catholic saints. Later Protestant taste turned from the display in churches of religious scenes, although some continued to be displayed in homes. There was also a reaction against large images from classical mythology, the other manifestation of high style at the time. This brought about a style that was more directly related to accurately portraying the present times. The traditions of landscapes and genre paintings that would fully flower in the 17th century began during this period.

Peter Bruegel (1525–1569) of Flanders is the great genre painter of his time, who worked for both Catholic and Protestant patrons. In most of his paintings, even when depicting religious scenes, most space is given to landscape or peasant life in 16th century Flanders. Bruegel's Peasant Wedding, portrays a Flemish-peasant wedding dinner in a barn, which makes no reference to any religious, historical or classical events, and merely gives insight into the everyday life of the Flemish peasant. Another great painter of his age, Lucas van Leyden (1489–1533), is known mostly for his engravings, such as The Milkmaid, which depicts peasants with milk cows. This engraving, from 1510, well before the Reformation, contains no reference to religion or classicism, although much of his other work features both.

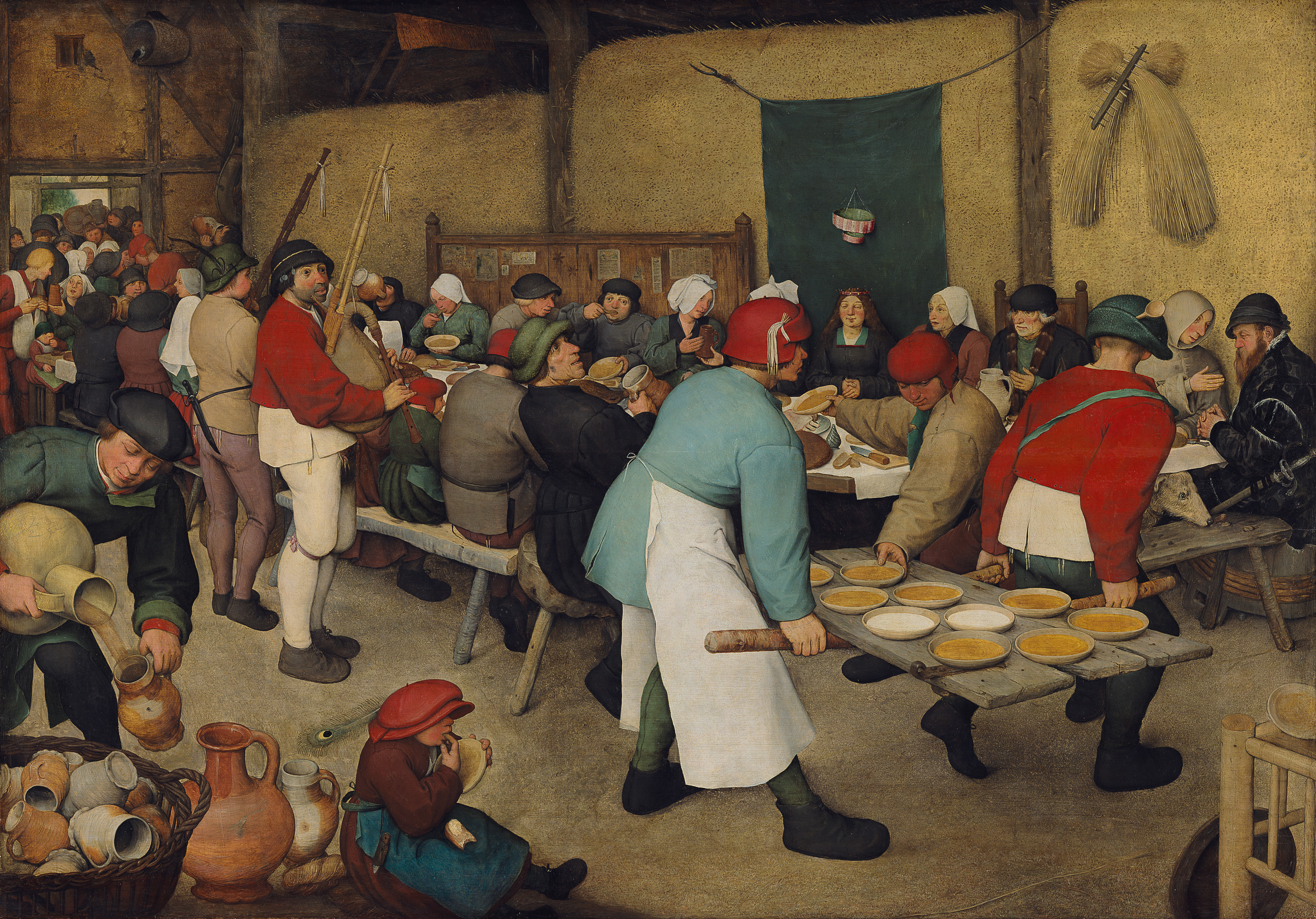
Peter Bruegel's Peasant Wedding Feast.

Bruegel was also an accomplished landscape painter. Frequently Bruegel painted agricultural landscapes, such as Summer from his famous set of the seasons, where he shows peasants harvesting wheat in the country, with a few workers taking a lunch break under a nearby tree. This type of landscape painting, apparently void of religious or classical connotations, gave birth to a long line of northern European landscape artists, such as Jacob van Ruisdael.

With the great development of the engraving and printmaking market in Antwerp in the 16th century, the public was provided with accessible and affordable images. Many artists provided drawings to book and print publishers, including Bruegel. In 1555 Bruegel began working for The Four Winds, a publishing house owned by Hieronymus Cock. The Four Winds provided the public with almost a thousand etchings and engravings over two decades. Between 1555 and 1563 Bruegel supplied Cock with almost 40 drawings, which were engraved for the Flemish public.

The courtly style of Northern Mannerism in the second half of the century has been seen as partly motivated by the desire of rulers in both the Holy Roman Empire and France to find a style of art that could appeal to members of the courtly elite on both sides of the religious divide. Thus religious controversy had the rather ironic effect of encouraging classical mythology in art, since though they might disapprove, even the most stern Calvinists could not credibly claim that 16th century mythological art really represented idolatry.

== Council of Trent ==
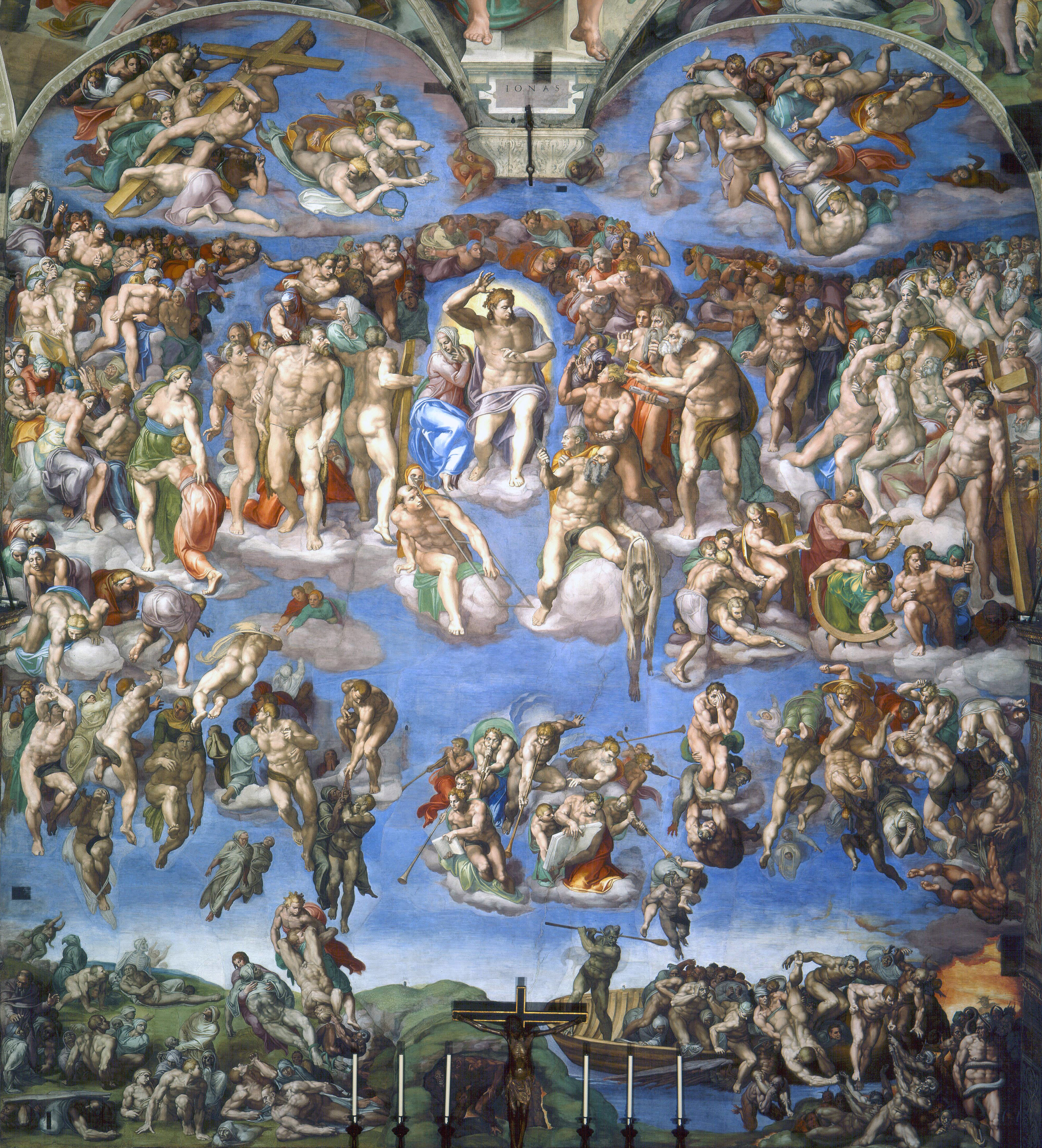
The Last Judgment fresco in the Sistine Chapel by Michelangelo (1534–41) came under persistent attack in the Counter-Reformation for, among other things, nudity (later painted over for several centuries), not showing Christ seated or bearded, and including the pagan figure of Charon.

During the Reformation a great divergence arose between the Catholic Church and the Protestant Reformers of the north regarding the content and style of art work. The Catholic Church viewed Protestantism and Reformed iconoclasm as a threat to the church and in response came together at the Council of Trent to institute some of their own reforms. The church felt that much religious art in Catholic countries (especially Italy) had lost its focus on religious subject-matter, and became too interested in material things and decorative qualities. The council came together periodically between 1545 and 1563. The reforms that resulted from this council are what set the basis for what is known as the Counter-Reformation.

Italian painting after the 1520s, with the notable exception of the art of Venice, developed into Mannerism, a highly sophisticated style, striving for effect, that concerned many churchmen as lacking appeal for the mass of the population. Church pressure to restrain religious imagery affected art from the 1530s and resulted in the decrees of the final session of the Council of Trent in 1563 including short and rather inexplicit passages concerning religious images, which were to have great impact on the development of Catholic art. Previous Catholic Church councils had rarely felt the need to pronounce on these matters, unlike Orthodox ones which have often ruled on specific types of images.

Statements are often made along the lines of "The decrees of the Council of Trent stipulated that art was to be direct and compelling in its narrative presentation, that it was to provide an accurate presentation of the biblical narrative or saint’s life, rather than adding incidental and imaginary moments, and that it was to encourage piety", but in fact the actual decrees of the council were far less explicit than this, though all of these points were probably in line with their intentions. The very short passage dealing with art came only in the final session in 1563, as a last minute and little-discussed addition, based on a French draft. The decree confirmed the traditional doctrine that images only represented the person depicted, and that veneration to them was paid to the person themself, not the image, and further instructed that:

...every superstition shall be removed ... all lasciviousness be avoided; in such wise that figures shall not be painted or adorned with a beauty exciting to lust... there be nothing seen that is disorderly, or that is unbecomingly or confusedly arranged, nothing that is profane, nothing indecorous, seeing that holiness becometh the house of God. And that these things may be the more faithfully observed, the holy Synod ordains, that no one be allowed to place, or cause to be placed, any unusual image, in any place, or church, howsoever exempted, except that image have been approved of by the bishop ...

The number of decorative treatments of religious subjects declined sharply, as did "unbecomingly or confusedly arranged" Mannerist pieces, as a number of books, notably by the Flemish theologian Molanus, Saint Charles Borromeo and Cardinal Gabriele Paleotti, and instructions by local bishops, amplified the decrees, often going into minute detail on what was acceptable. Many traditional iconographies considered without adequate scriptural foundation were in effect prohibited, as was any inclusion of classical pagan elements in religious art, and almost all nudity, including that of the infant Jesus. According to the great medievalist Émile Mâle, this was "the death of medieval art".

== Art and the Counter-Reformation ==
Scipione Pulzone's Lamentation, a typical Counter-Reformation work.

While Calvinists largely removed public art from religion and Reformed societies moved towards more "secular" forms of art which might be said to glorify God through the portrayal of the "natural beauty of His creation and by depicting people who were created in His image", Counter-Reformation Catholic church continued to encourage religious art, but insisted it was strictly religious in content, glorifying God and Catholic traditions, including the sacraments and the saints. Likewise, "Lutheran places of worship contain images and sculptures not only of Christ but also of biblical and occasionally of other saints as well as prominent decorated pulpits due to the importance of preaching, stained glass, ornate furniture, magnificent examples of traditional and modern architecture, carved or otherwise embellished altar pieces, and liberal use of candles on the altar and elsewhere." The main difference between Lutheran and Roman Catholic places of worship was the presence of the tabernacle in the latter.

Sydney Joseph Freedberg, who invented the term Counter-Maniera, cautions against connecting this more austere style in religious painting, which spread from Rome from about 1550, too directly with the decrees of Trent, as it pre-dates these by several years. He describes the decrees as "a codifying and official sanction of a temper that had come to be conspicuous in Roman culture".

Scipione Pulzone's (1550–1598) painting of the Lamentation which was commissioned for the Church of the Gesù in 1593 is a Counter-Maniera work that gives a clear demonstration of what the holy council was striving for in the new style of religious art. With the focus of the painting giving direct attention to the crucifixion of Christ, it complies with the religious content of the council and shows the story of the passion while keeping Christ in the image of the ideal human.

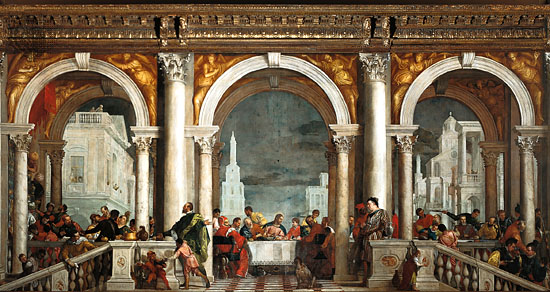
Paolo Veronese's Last Supper (The Feast in the House of Levi)

Ten years after the Council of Trent's decree Paolo Veronese was summoned by the Venetian Holy Inquisition to explain why his Last Supper, a huge canvas for the refectory of a monastery, contained, in the words of the Inquisition: "buffoons, drunken Germans, dwarfs and other such scurrilities" as well as extravagant costumes and settings, in what is indeed a fantasy version of a Venetian patrician feast. Veronese was told that he must change his indecorous painting within a three-month period – in fact he just changed the title to The Feast in the House of Levi, still an episode from the Gospels, but a less doctrinally central one, and no more was said. No doubt any Protestant authorities would have been equally disapproving. The pre-existing decline in "donor portraits" (those who had paid for an altarpiece or other painting being placed within the painting) was also accelerated; these become rare after the council.

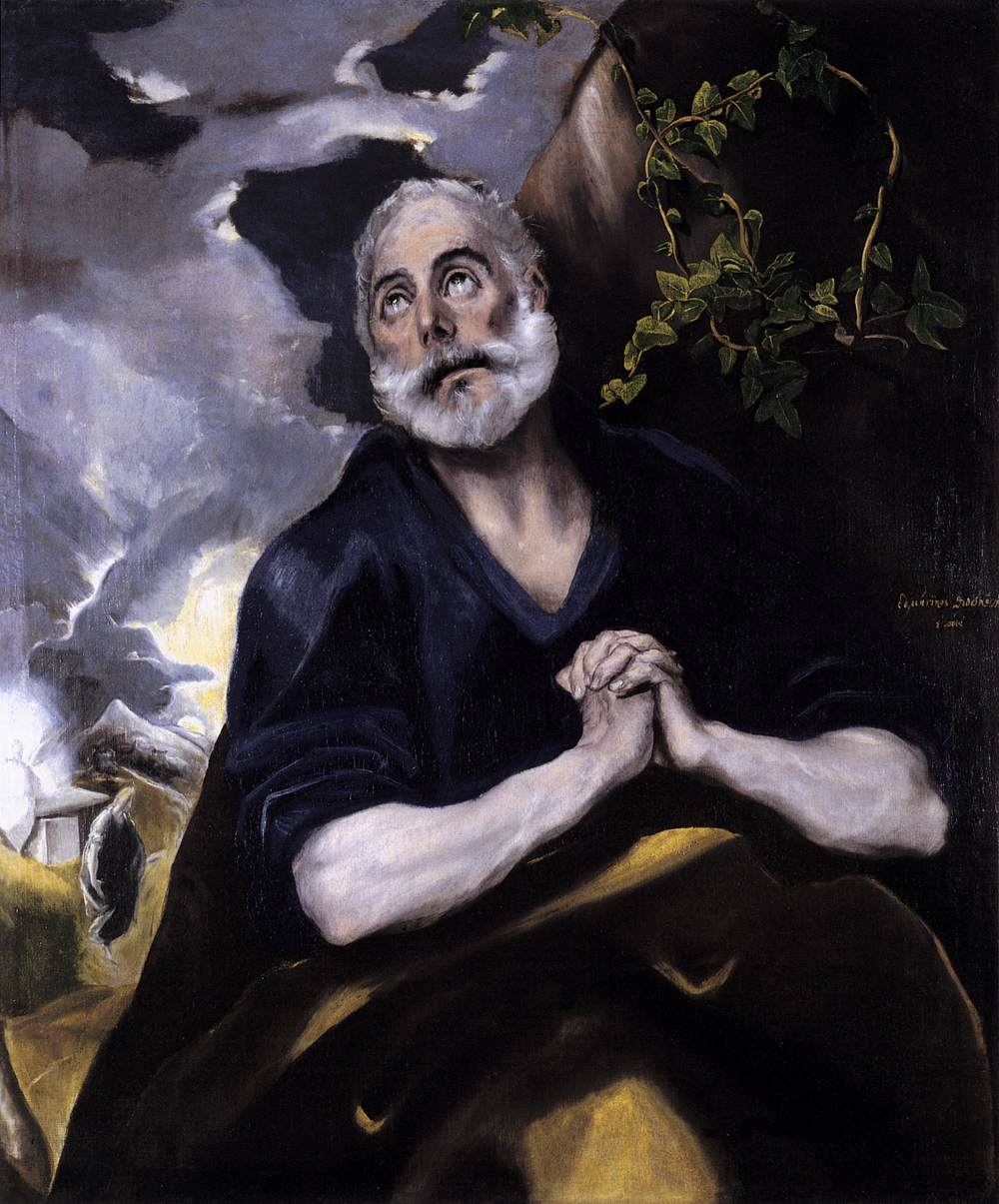
Repentance of Peter by El Greco, 1580–1586.

Further waves of "Counter-Reformation art" occurred when areas formerly Protestant were again brought under Catholic rule. The churches were normally empty of images, and such periods could represent a boom time for artists. The best known example is the new Spanish Netherlands (essentially modern Belgium), which had been the centre of Protestantism in the Netherlands but became (initially) exclusively Catholic after the Spanish drove the Protestants to the north, where they established the United Provinces. Rubens was one of a number of Flemish Baroque painters who received many commissions, and produced several of his best known works re-filling the empty churches. Several cities in France in the French wars of religion and in Germany, Bohemia and elsewhere in the Thirty Years War saw similar bursts of restocking.

The rather extreme pronouncement by a synod in Antwerp in 1610 that in future the central panels of altarpieces should only show New Testament scenes was certainly ignored in the cases of many paintings by Rubens and other Flemish artists (and in particular the Jesuits continued to commission altarpieces centred on their saints), but nonetheless New Testament subjects probably did increase. Altarpieces became larger and more easy to make out from a distance, and the large painted or gilded carved wooden altarpieces that were the pride of many northern late medieval cities were often replaced with paintings.

Some subjects were given increased prominence to reflect Counter-Reformation emphases. The Repentance of Peter, showing the end of the episode of the Denial of Peter, was not often seen before the Counter-Reformation, when it became popular as an assertion of the sacrament of Confession against Protestant attacks. This followed an influential book by the Jesuit Cardinal Robert Bellarmine (1542–1621). The image typically shows Peter in tears, as a half-length portrait with no other figures, often with hands clasped as at right, and sometimes "the cock" in the background; it was often coupled with a repentant Mary Magdalen, another exemplar from Bellarmine's book.

As the Counter-Reformation grew stronger and the Catholic Church felt less threat from the Protestant Reformation, Rome once again began to assert its universality to other nations around the world. The religious order of the Jesuits or the Society of Jesus, sent missionaries to the Americas, parts of Africa, India and eastern Asia and used the arts as an effective means of articulating their message of the Catholic Church's dominance over the Christian faith. The Jesuits' impact was so profound during their missions of the time that today very similar styles of art from the Counter-Reformation period in Catholic churches are found all over the world.

Despite the differences in approaches to religious art, stylistic developments passed about as quickly across religious divisions as within the two "blocs". Artistically Rome remained in closer touch with the Netherlands than with Spain.
