= Daniel Hisgen =

German painter

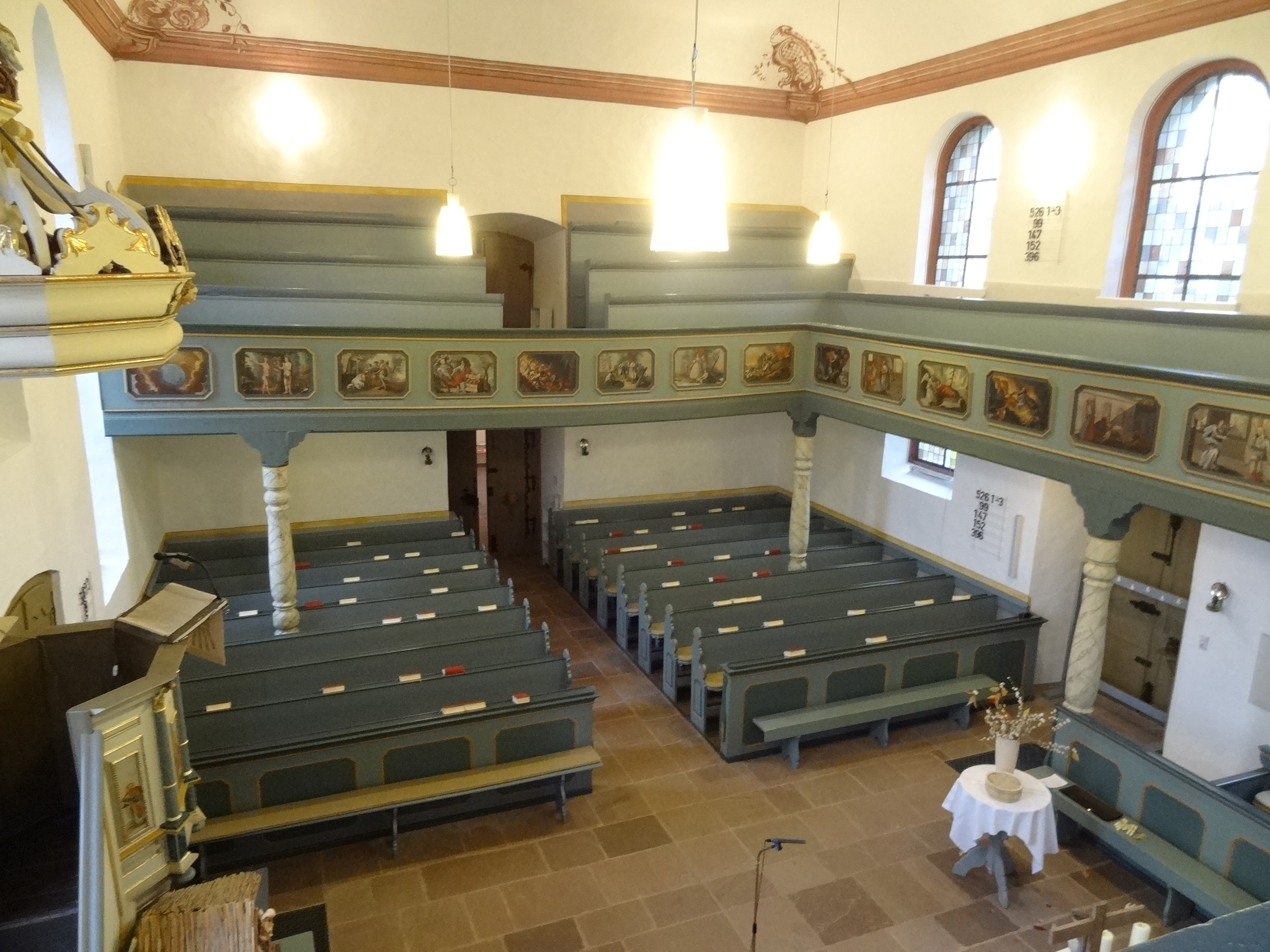
Hisgen's paintings are typically put on the parapets of church-galleries (e.g. St. Michael, Oberkleen). Here the Creation (left) to the Annunciation can be seen.

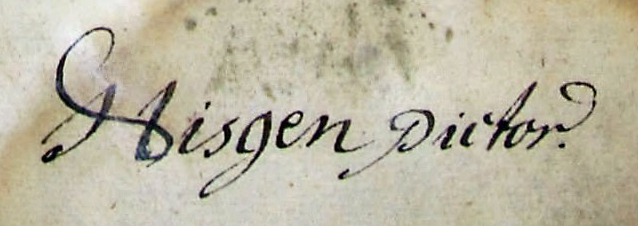
Signature as "Hisgen pictor" (painter) on a bill from 1765

Daniel Hisgen (April 10, 1733 probably in Nieder-Weisel, Hesse, Germany – February 19, 1812 in Lich) was a German painter of the rococo period who worked as a church painter in Upper Hesse, specializing on cycles of paintings decorating the front of the gallery parapet in churches with an upper gallery. His discreet cycles demonstrate the modest prominence expected of Lutheran art in German churches of his day, taking a middle route between the large and prominent images in Catholic churches, and the complete absence of images in Calvinist ones.

== Life and family ==
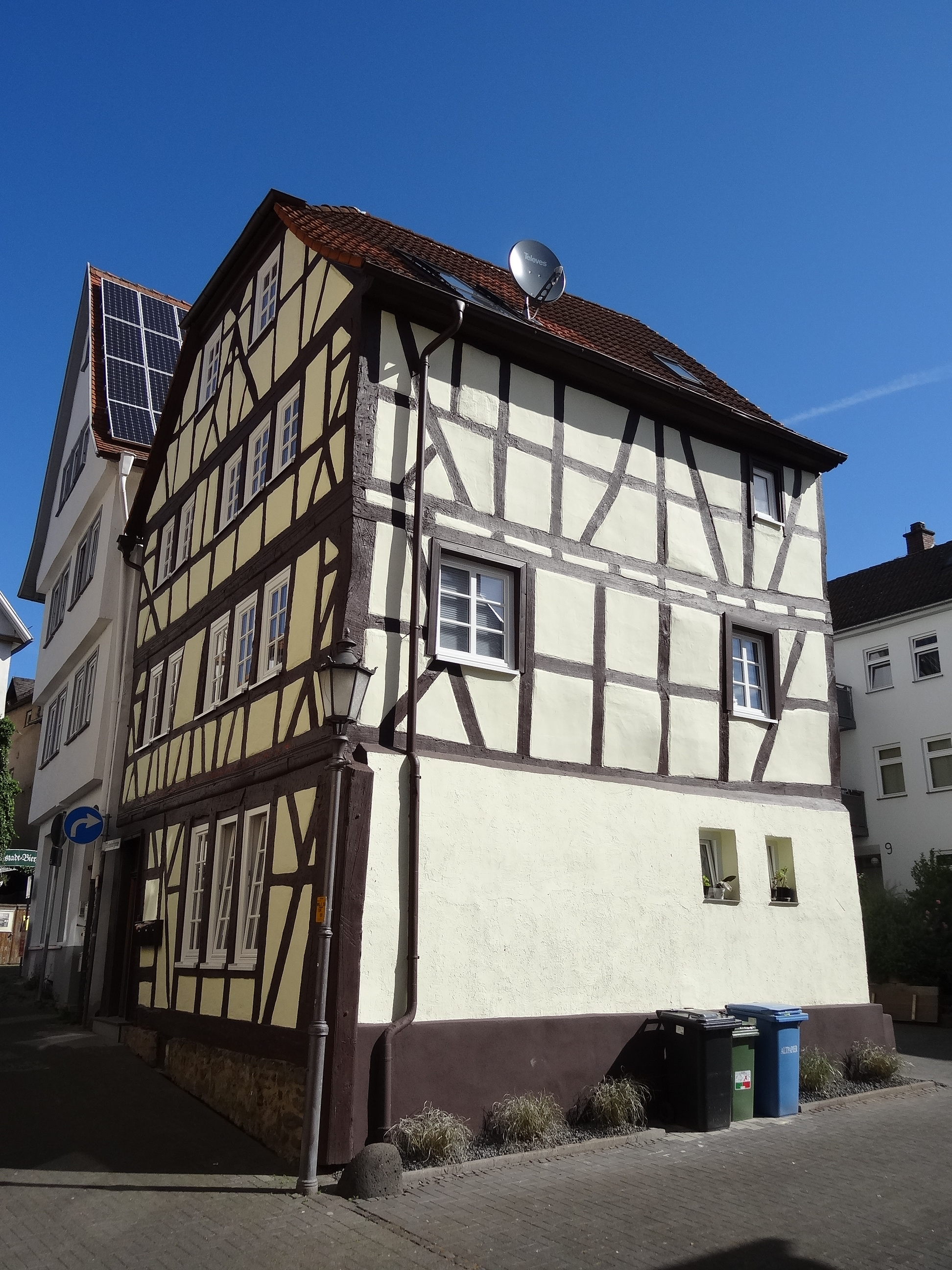
Residence of the Hisgen family in the Seelenhofgasse 2 in Lich

The ancestors of the Hisgen (meaning "little house") family fled as Huguenots from France to the Netherlands and then distributed to the area near Montabaur, Wetzlar and Lich. Daniel Hisgen was the oldest son of the Protestant pastor Johann Georg Hisgen (August 30, 1707 - June 2, 1769) and his wife Johannetta Judith Budoin (Johanna Budi) (February 4, 1706 - February 23, 1765). Daniel's godmother was an unmarried sister of his father. Johann Georg was a native of Wetzlar and pastor at Nieder-Weisel (Butzbach) for 37 years from 1732 to his death. Daniel grew up in the village of Nieder-Weisel where his parents are still buried in a crypt in the Protestant church. When the church records of Nieder-Weisel were destroyed by fire in 1761, Johann Georg and the villagers created a new church book from memory for the years from 1690 to 1761. Nieder-Weisel citizens and Johann Georg went all the way to the Reichskammergericht (highest court in the Holy Roman Empire) on a dispute about building defects.

On November 28, 1769 Daniel Hisgen married Philippina Louisa Stiehl (baptized August 8, 1747 - August 8, 1820) from Alten-Buseck. A penance was imposed on both because the first daughter Johannetta Catharina (December 21, 1769 - March 3, 1834) was born just four weeks after the wedding. Daniel settled in Lich and the marriage produced five children. The oldest daughter remained unmarried, the others were Friedrich Wilhelm (March 22, 1773 - March 1, 1853), Maria Elisabetha (Born May 5, 1775), Christian Wilhelm (April 13, 1777 - May 27, 1839) and Johann Heinrich (born June 30, 1780). Godfather of the latter was Daniel's brother Johann Henrich Hisgen, who is documented as a "Kauf- und Handelsmann in Wetzlar" (tradesman in Wetzlar).

The oldest son Friedrich Wilhelm, a government secretary in Hungen, was married to Catharina Margartha Rouge (born January 6, 1786). The couple had 14 children including a son called Georg Konrad (April 20, 1820 in Lich - March 16, 1898), who emigrated without his wife Katharina Preiss (1819-1898) to America. Daniel's fourth child, Christian Wilhelm, also became a painter and a merchant and grocer. He married Katharina Elisabeth Hornivius (1775 - April 13, 1859) and had six children, including Johann Conrad Hisgen (August 9, 1810 - May 26, 1897). Johann Conrad, painter and varnisher, was in his first marriage married to Anna Margarete Jung (August 14, 1815 - June 5, 1836). After her death he married Juliana Barbara Völnele. In his third marriage he had four children. He emigrated to America and left a half year old child in Hameln, for which he was sentenced to jail for four weeks. Carl Quirin Hisgen (March 21, 1812 - June 11, 1894), another son of Christian Wilhelm, became a painter and emigrated to America. A grandson of Christian Wilhelm, called Karl Maximilian Hisgen (February 2, 1844 - July 12, 1905) became a painter, also his eponymous son Karl Maximilian (October 7, 1878). Johann Heinrich, fifth child of Daniel Hisgen, temporarily lived in Engelrod. In 1818 he painted a portrait of Martin Luther with a swan (oil on wood) for the Protestant church in Nieder-Oberrod, and 1837 a similar scene in a medallion for the Protestant church in Michelbach (Schotten). In 1847 he is documented as a picture restorer in Darmstadt. Probably the most famous descendant of Daniel Hisgen is Thomas L. Hisgen (November 26, 1858 - August 27, 1925), an American petroleum producer and politician.

== Work ==
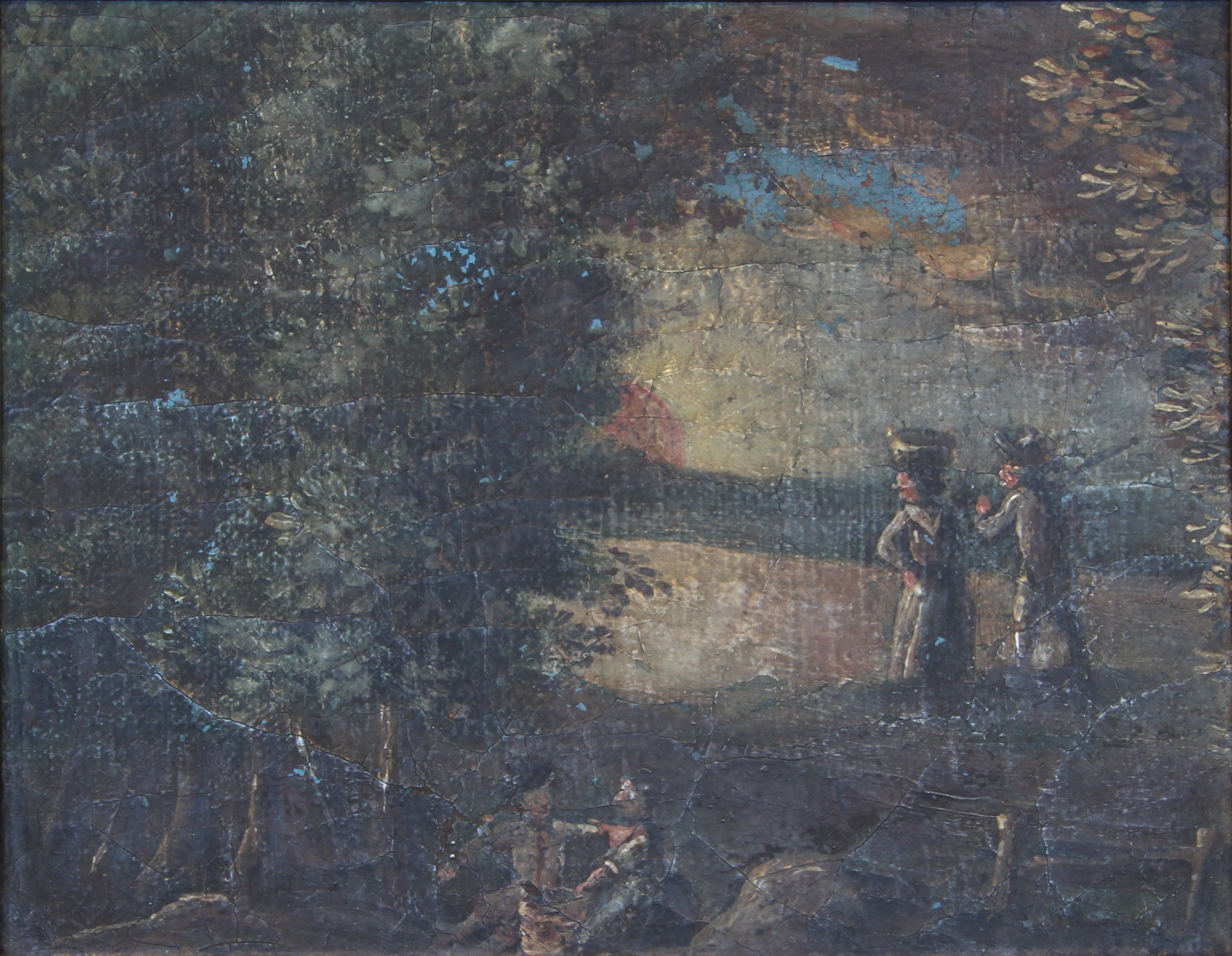
Idyllic landscape, discovered 2015

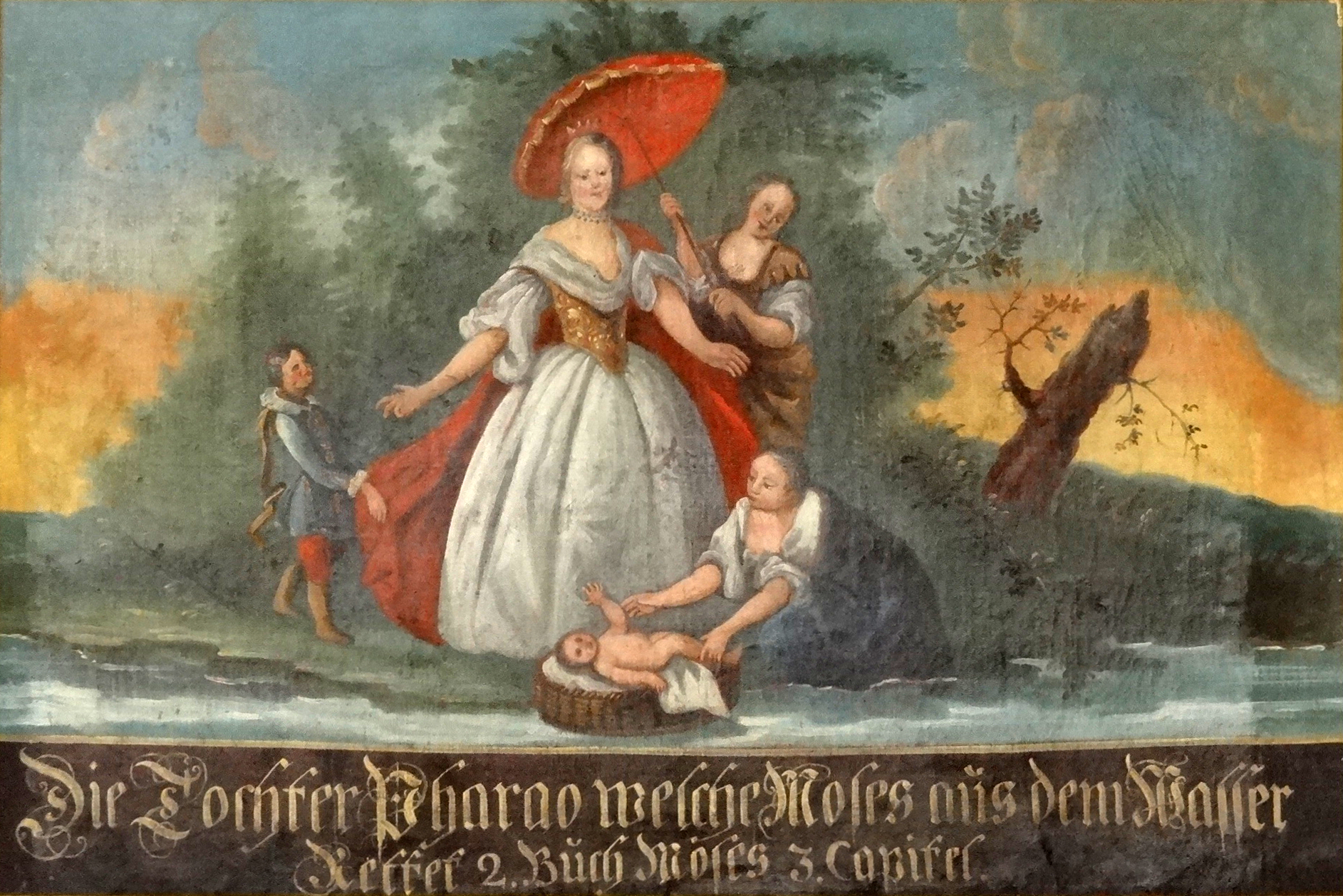
Hisgens characters wear contemporary clothes of the Rococo period. Here The Finding of Moses by the Pharaoh's daughter

Hisgen emerges primarily as a church painter in Upper Hesse and worked mainly in what is now the Giessen district, but also sporadically in the Wetzlar area and in the Vogelsberg region. His identity has long been unclear, so that he was provisionally designated as the "Freienseer Master". Due to his characteristic style and the cyclic structure of his gallery-paintings with biblical motifs, the parapet-paintings on railings in Bobenhausen II, Albach, Burkhardsfelden, Freienseen and Odenhausen/Lahn were attributed to the same artist. The biblical characters on the pictures wear contemporary clothes of the Rococo period, which is particularly evident in the pictures of the infant Moses rescued by the Egyptian princess from the river. The characters in these scenes are shown in the same way in all cycles. Comparable to the bible illustrations by Christoph Murer in the Tübingen Bible (1591), Hisgen stands in the tradition of the Biblia pauperum. These works of provincial art lean on models, but develop those in the late Baroque style, which is reflected in the use of light on moving figures. This synthesis has been called a "dramatic art of the simple" ("Dramatik des Schlichten"). In Atzbach and other churches his students or children are chronicled to have contributed with "clumsy hands" ("ungeschickteren Händen") on the parapet-paintings, suggesting the good reputation of the master.

Until 2015 twelve upper Hessian churches (all heritage listed) have been identified as having pictures with biblical scenes by Hisgen. In general there is the same number of pictures from the Old Testament and the New Testament. Illustrations of the Passion make the biggest part among paintings from the New Testament. The more than 300 images show 66 scenes from the Bible, from which 28 scenes have been painted only once. Hisgen used the same compositions for illustrations that occur repeatedly, like the Annunciation and the Birth of Christ. Exceptionally, the paintings in the church in Pohl-Göns only show apostles and evangelists. Some cycles have tituli or captions with the related biblical passage.

As a church painter Hisgen also painted church ceilings and other works. A first activity as a painter can be traced on a bill from Nieder-Weisel in 1754. It's unknown where Hisgen learnt the craft of painting, perhaps he was self-taught. In the years 1762/1763 he worked for 126 days on new surfaces for the pulpit and the princes gallery in St. Mary's collegiate church in Lich, for which he received 292 Guilder. In the church in Albach Hisgen decorated the cheeks of the church pews with floral pattern and the corners of the ceiling with angel medallions. In 1778 he gilded the finial, the weathervane and the star of the church in the Ober-Hörgern. In 1780 Hisgen provided the organ case of St. Mary's collegiate church in Lich in 1780 with a new edging and gilding and painted the casing silver. 1808, in the high age of 75 years, Hisgen painted the church in Odenhausen (Lahn). In November 2015, a small painting with an idyllic landscape by Hisgen was discovered in Lich.

== List of works ==
In many cases authorship is based on attributions and style comparisons. Preserved paintings put on the parapets of galleries can be found in the following churches:

Year	Location	Church	Description	Picture
1765	Bobenhausen II	Protestant church	48 unsigned parapet-paintings (oil on canvas): 4 evangelists, 12 apostles and an illustrated cycle from Creation of the world to Pentecost	Selling of Joseph
1767	Atzbach (Hesse)	Protestant church	43 parapet-paintings with 18 scenes of the Old Testament and 25 of the New Testament; Hisgen's authorship is proven	The Good Shepherd
1770	Oberkleen	St. Michaelis	25 parapet-paintings with biblical scenes from Creation to Pentecost, also a large ceiling painting and 4 evangelists on the panels of the pulpit; Hisgen's authorship is proven	The Finding of Moses
1770s	Ettingshausen	Protestant church	6 out of twelve parapet-paintings were preserved after a church renovation, a seventh was presented to Oberkirchenrat Petri from Darmstadt, an eighth was enlarged and painted over by Kurt Scriba; Hisgen's authorship is assumed, he painted the church, in the same style 12 paintings of the apostles on the panels of the pulpit	Adam and Eve
1772 ?	Ebersgöns	Protestant church	17 unsigned parapet-paintings with biblical scenes, 10 from the Old Testament, 7 from the New Testament	Jacob and Laban Make a Deal
1773	Freienseen	Protestant church	24 unsigned parapet-paintings with 14 scenes from the Old Testament and 10 from the New Testament, flowers on the panelled parapets of the pews	Creation of the World
1774	Albach (Fernwald)	Protestant church	33 parapet-paintings with 19 scenes from the Old Testament and 14 from the New Testament, flowers on the panelled parapets of the pews; Hisgen's authorship is proven	Transfiguration of Jesus
1775	Lang-Göns	Jakobuskirche	20 parapet-paintings with biblical scenes; one painting signed	Annunciation
1775/1776?	Nonnenroth	Protestant church	4 unsigned parapet-paintings of the evangelists on the eastern gallery, flowers on the panelled parapets of the pews	John the Apostle
around 1780	Burkhardsfelden	Protestant church	15 unsigned parapet-paintings of the Four Evangelists and of the Life of Christ; also eight figures of the Old Testament on the panels of the pulpit	The Three Magi
1785/1786	Oppenrod	Protestant church	16 parapet-paintings with scenes from the New Testament from Annunciation to the Entombment of Christ, one painting signed; some paintings were probably removed during the installation of the organ gallery.	Last Supper
1789	Leihgestern	Protestant church	26 parapet-paintings with biblical scenes, one painting signed	Jesus calls Zacchaeus down from the Tree
1806-1808	Odenhausen (Lahn)	Protestant church	27 parapet-paintings with biblical scenes (eight signed) and a large signed ceiling painting showing the Baptism of Jesus; 21 paintings in the aisle, seven on the western gallery; flowers on the panelled parapets of the pews	David and Nathan
