= Ettingshausen =

Inhabited place in Middle Hesse, Germany

Coordinates: 50.5599°N 8.9059°E

Ettingshausen is an inhabited place in Middle Hesse, Germany. It is part of the municipality (Gemeinde) of Reiskirchen, in the district (Landkreis) of Giessen. It has around 1,900 inhabitants.
