= Schneeberg Altarpiece =

First Post-Reformation Lutheran altarpiece

The Schneeberg Altarpiece
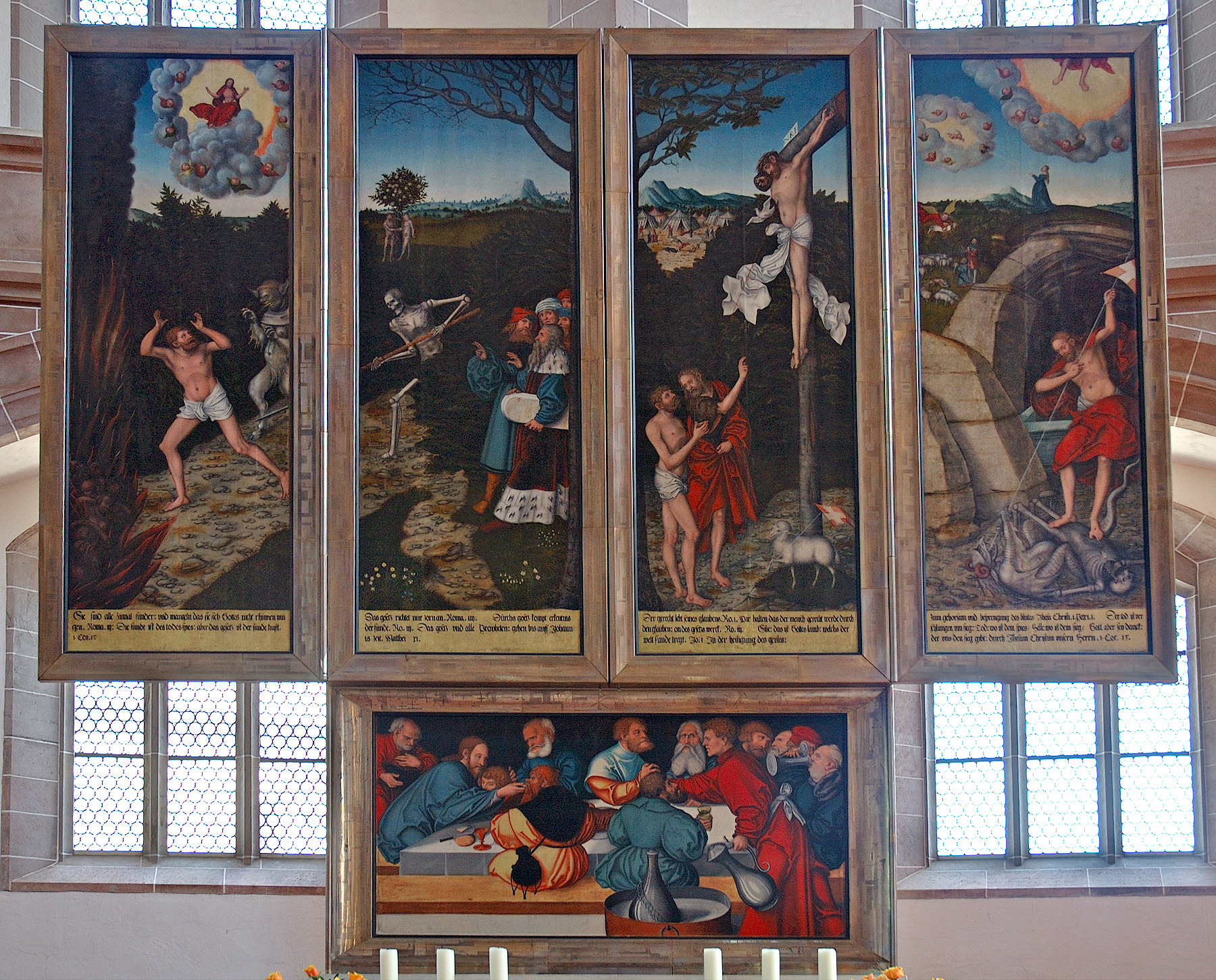
- Artist: Lucas Cranach the Elder
- Year: 1539
- Medium: Limewood
- Movement: German Renaissance
- Dimensions: 210 cm × 104 cm (83 in × 41 in)
- Location: St. Wolfgang's Church; Schneeberg
- Owner: Ev.-Luth. Kirchgemeinde St. Wolfgang, Schneeberg

The Schneeberg Altarpiece (or Schneeberg Reformation Altar) is a Lutheran winged altarpiece created in 1539 by Lucas Cranach the Elder for the Church of St. Wolfgang in Schneeberg in Saxony, Germany. The altarpiece was commissioned in 1531–1532 by the Elector of Saxony John I of Saxony and installed in the church in 1539, making it the first Protestant altarpiece of Reformation which is considered a Saxon masterpiece of art.

== History and description ==
Made and painted by Lucas Cranach the Elder, his son Lucas Cranach the Younger and his workshop, it was handed over to the parish in 1539 and installed in the St. Wolfgang Church in Schneeberg the same year. According to church registers, the Lutheran congregation of Schneeberg paid 357 guilders and three groschen for the altarpiece. Throughout the course of its history, the altarpiece went through numerous calamities. It was looted by imperial troops during the Thirty Years' War in 1633 and taken to Prague to be recovered 16 years later. In the course of the Baroque re-design in 1705, it was "altered in a tasteless way", namely dismantled into parts to be re-installed in the church outside the altar area. The altar survived the city fire in 1719 undamaged. After the bombing of Schneeberg on April 19, 1945, the altarpiece was rescued from the already burning church by many volunteers. Until 1969, some of the paintings were hung in the Trinity Church. After an extensive restoration, the double-opening winged altar can now be viewed in the form intended by Cranach.

== Interpretation of the altarpiece ==
The altar consists of twelve panels, each with a main image and a predella on the front and back and the four painted wings on the front and back. The inner wings can be folded. The predella depicts the Last Supper on the front—that is, the side facing the nave of the church. The painting on the back was completely destroyed in 1945 and could not be restored. Among the Biblical themes depicted on both the insides and outsides of the wings include the scene of the Agony in the Garden of Gethsemane, Crucifixion of Jesus, Resurrection of Jesus, Last Judgment, along with the Old Testament stories of the Flood and Sodom and Gomorrah, with local rulers of Saxony depicted kneeling in prayer. The altarpiece represents the Lutheran theology at its most basic level by forming a visual interpretation of Lutheran ideas such as justification of the sinner through grace, and John the Baptist pointing believers to the crucified Christ as the sole source of their salvation. Since the congregation walked around the altar during the Eucharist to receive the bread on one side, and the chalice containing the wine on the other, in accordance with the rites of Lutheranism, the back panel also painted for this purpose with the central picture showing the reception of the believers in the 'Kingdom of Heaven' with Christ's victory over death at the top, and the damnation of the evil shown below. Josef Heller describes the altar as "one of the most comprehensive major works with excellent execution" which represents the Lutheran approach to the sacred imagery and liturgy, along with the Protestant theological concept of 'Law and Grace' by reflecting the devotional forms of Nordic art of the 15th and early 16th centuries.

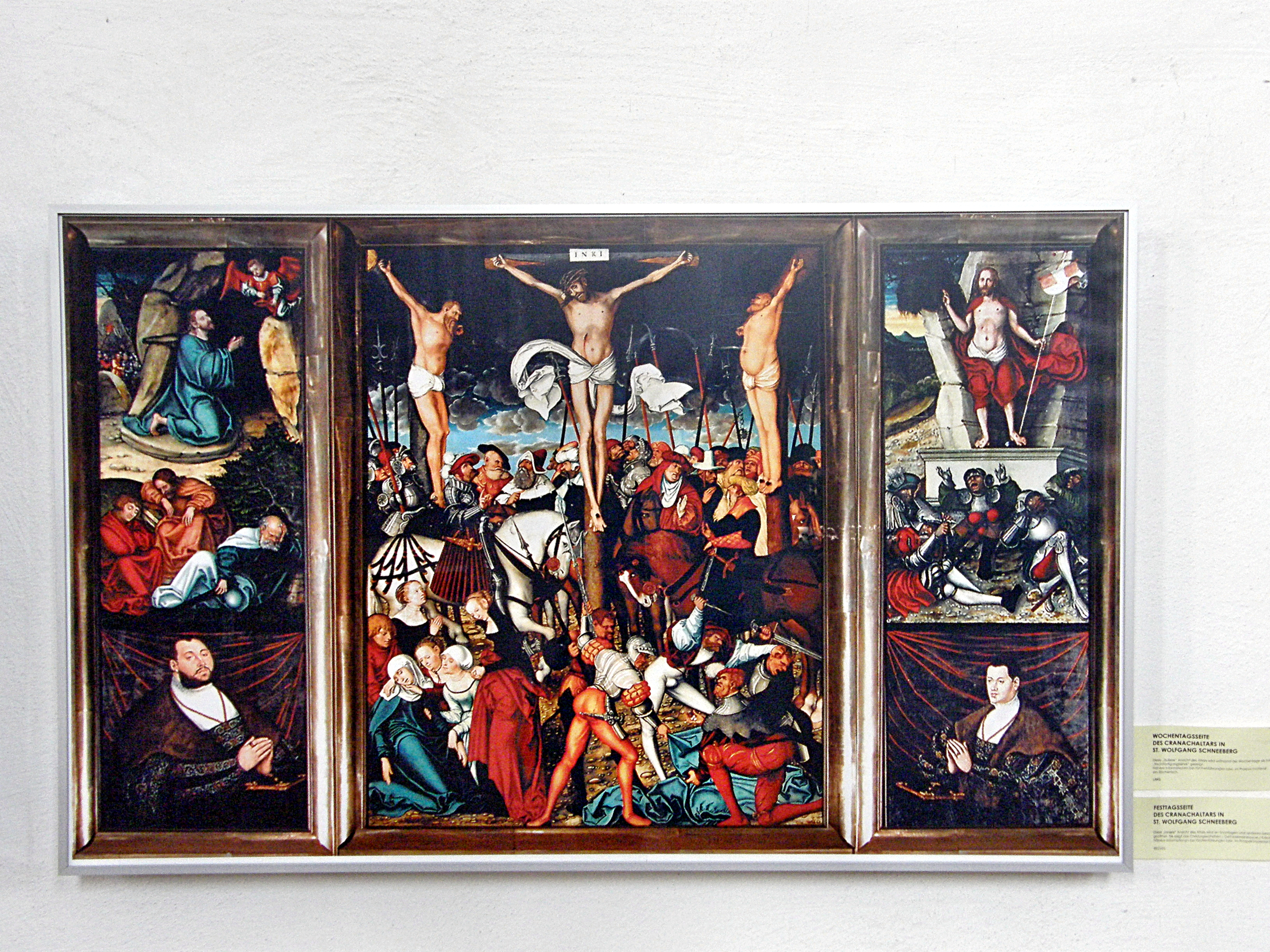
Open polyptych

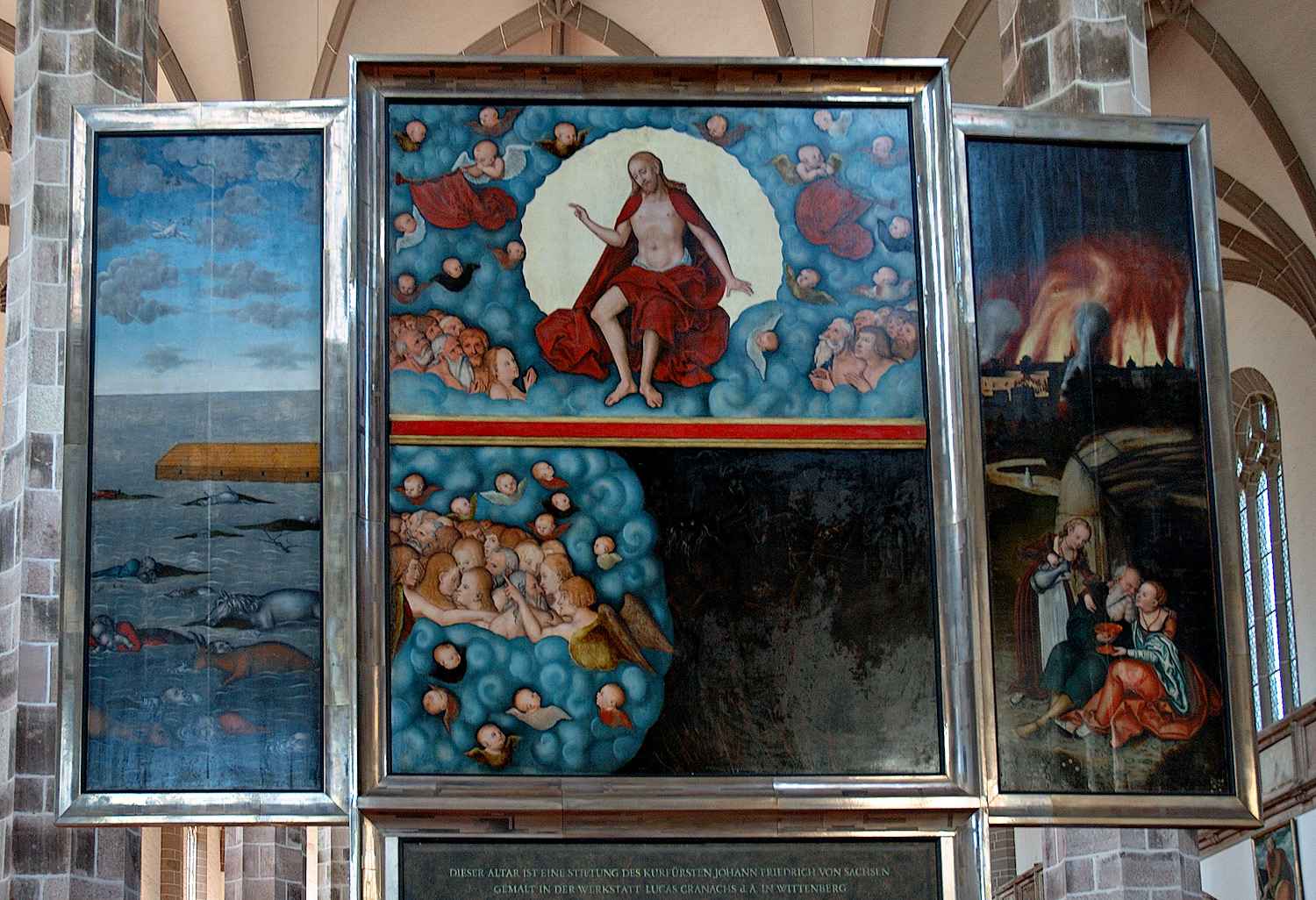
Ascension of Jesus

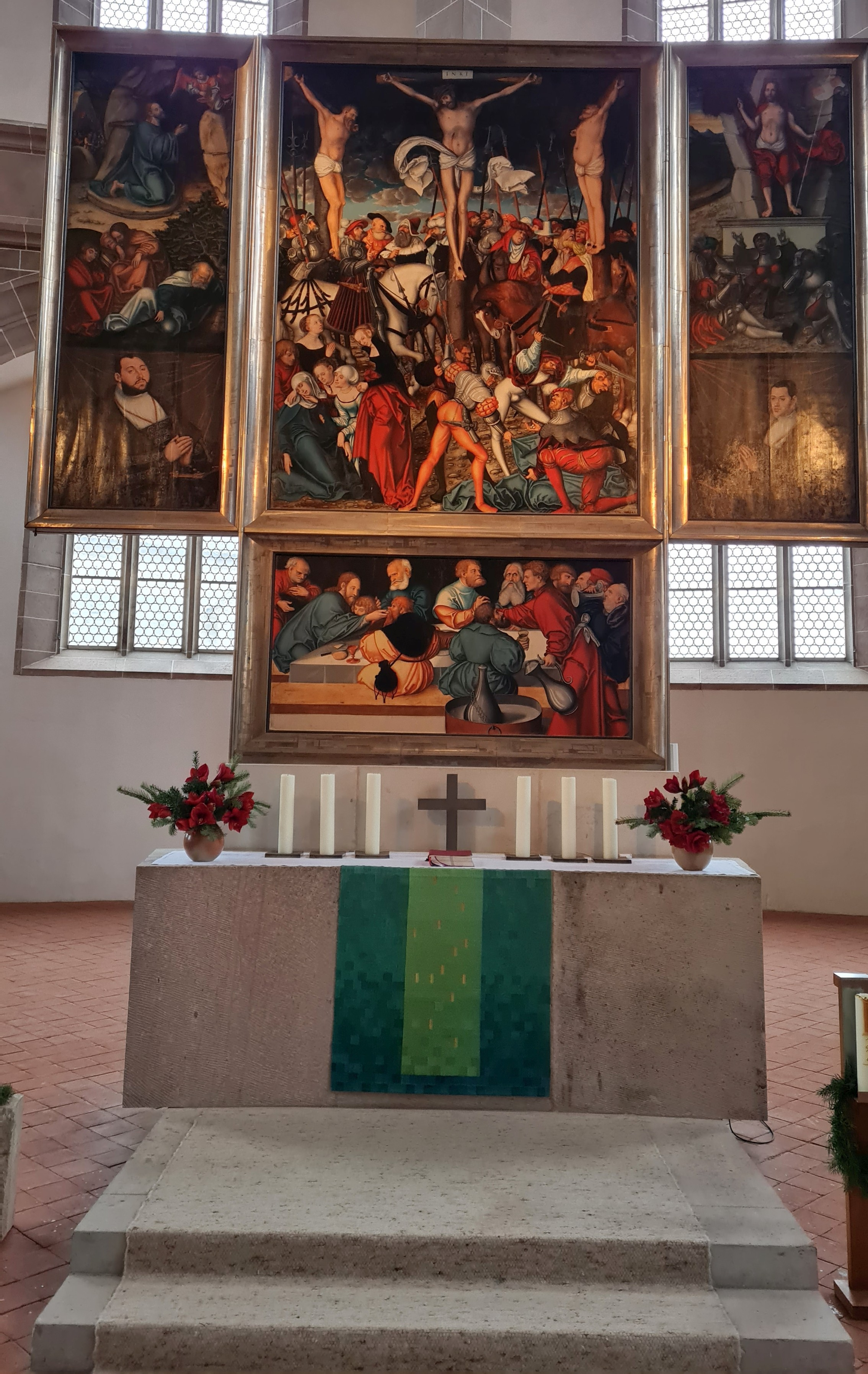
Altar table

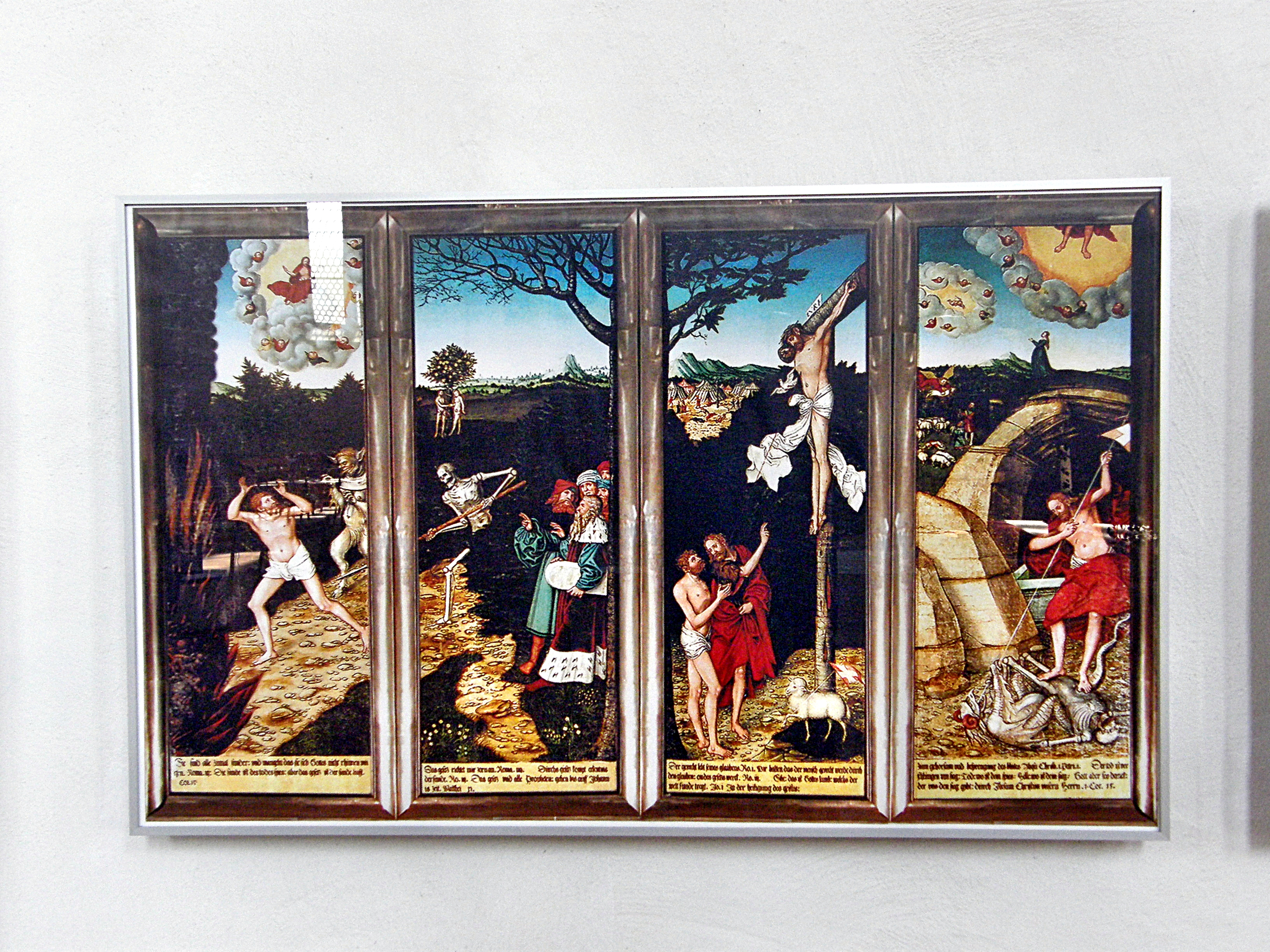
Christ's victory over death

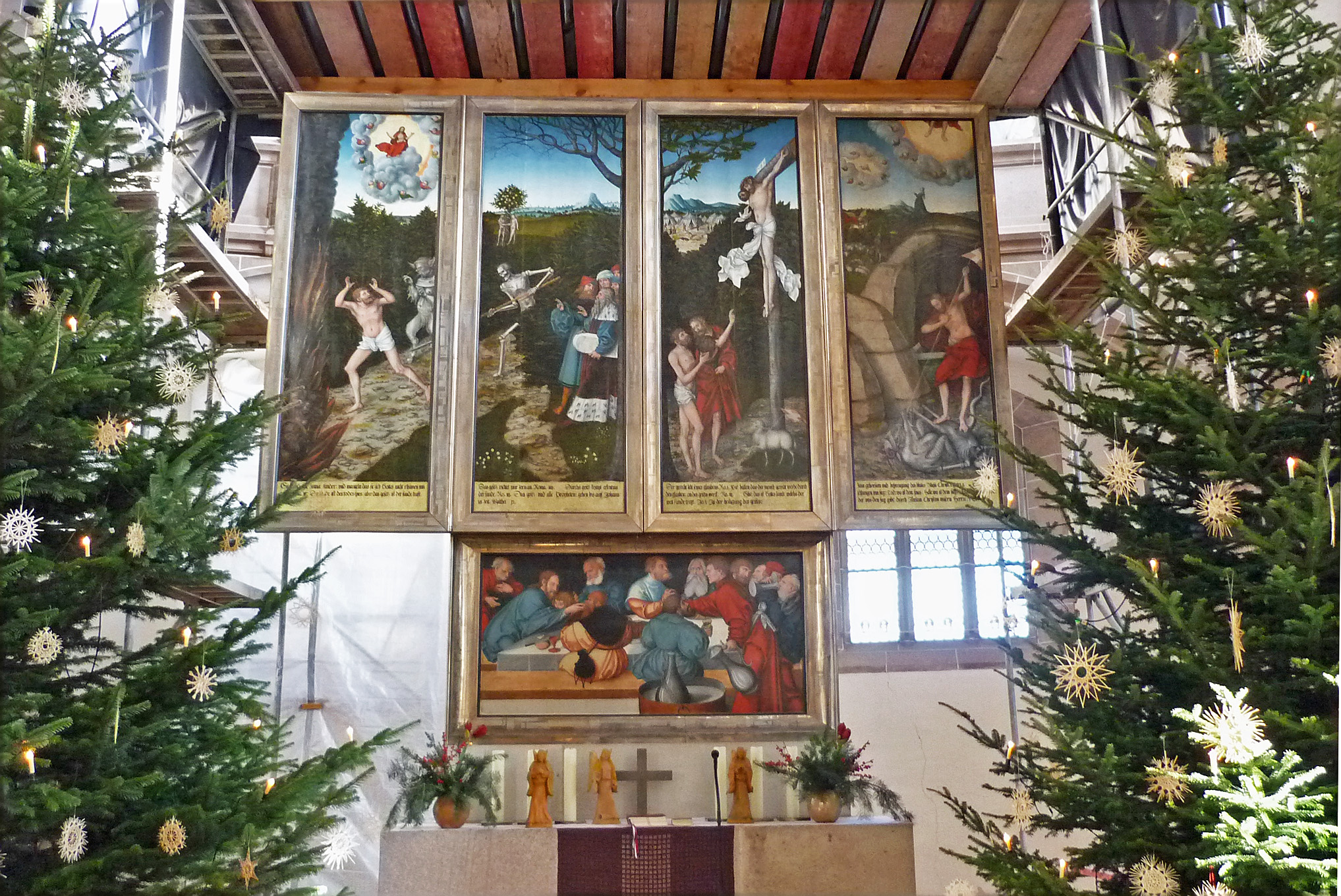
Christmas time

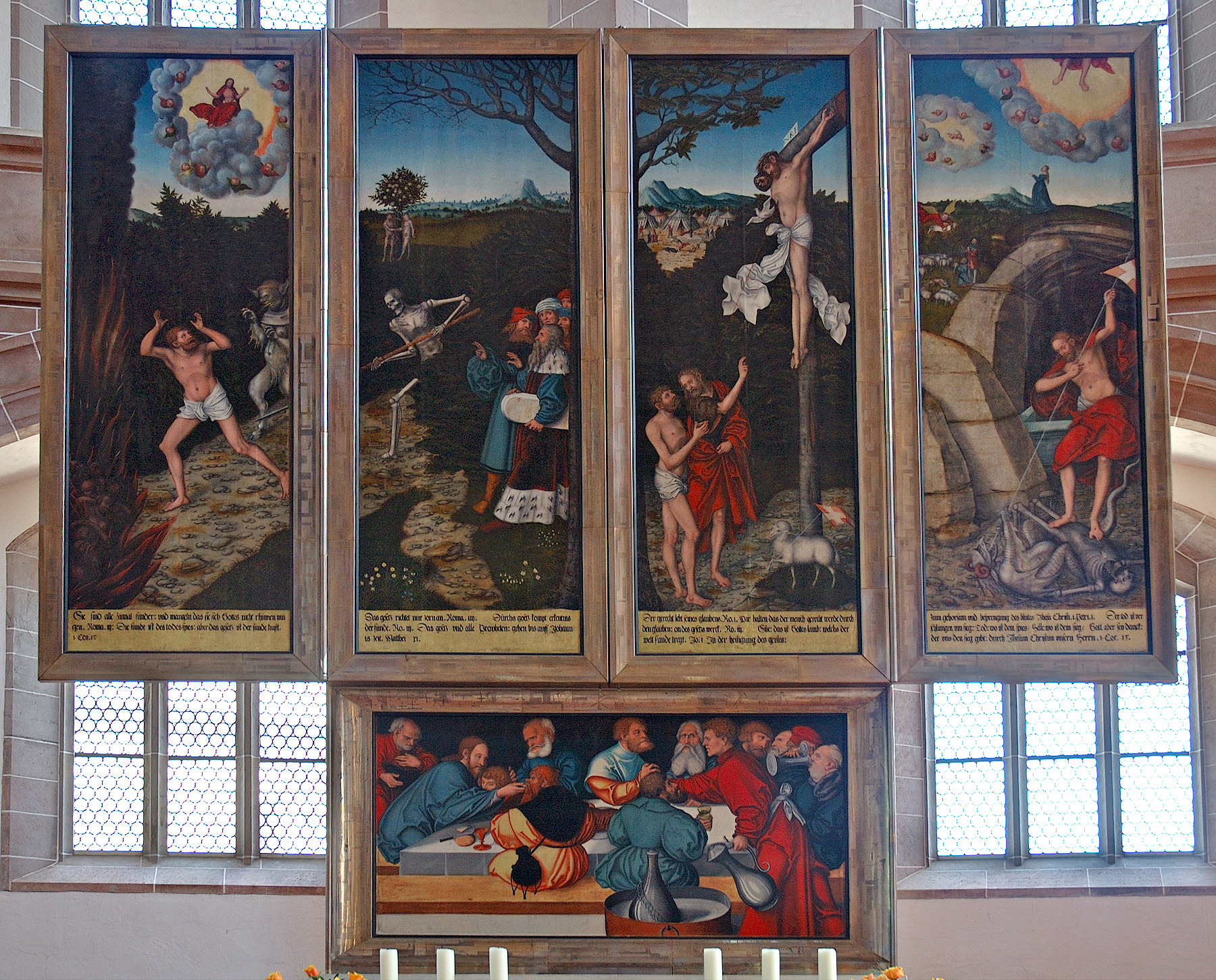
Front panel

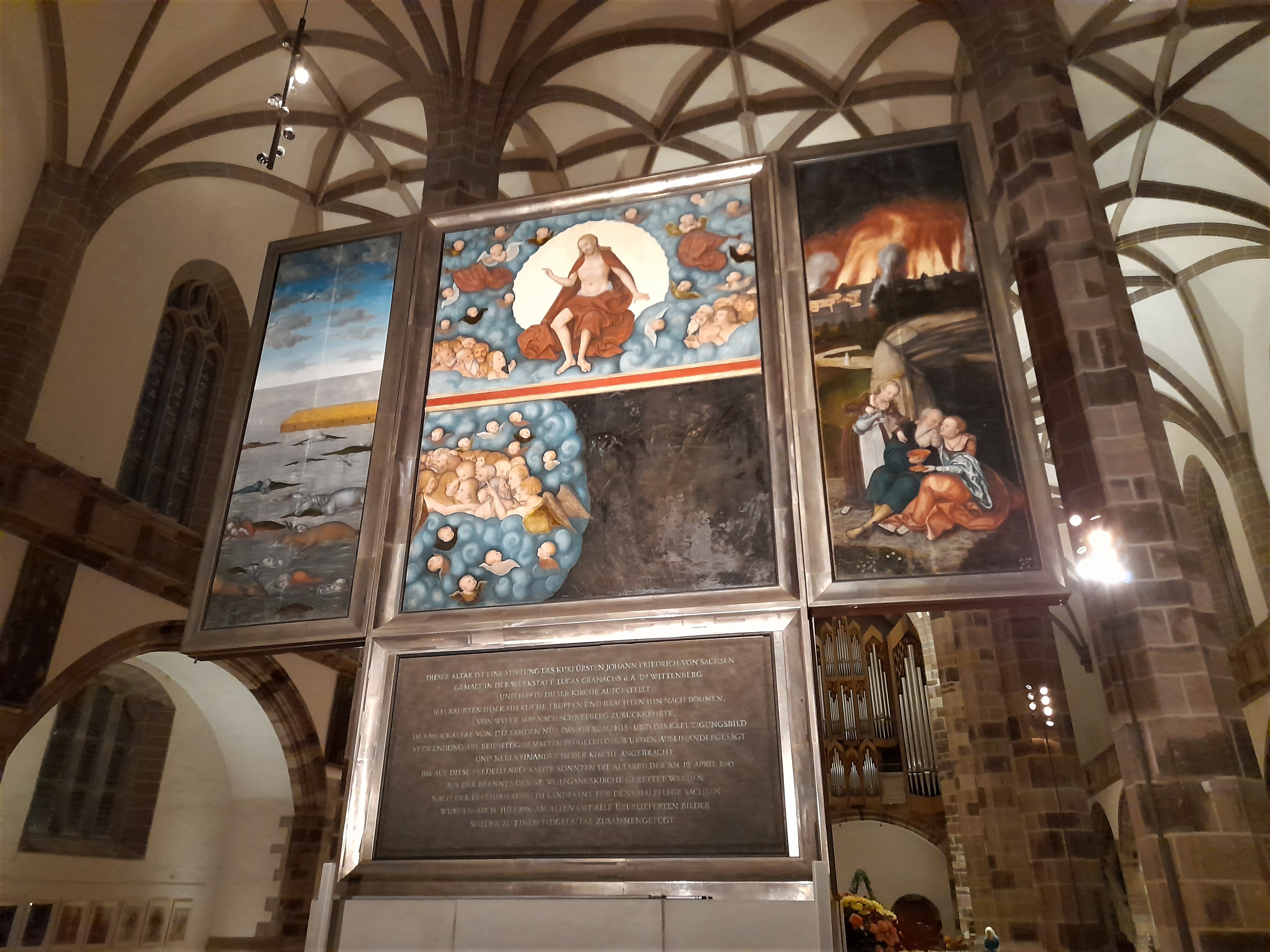
Back panel

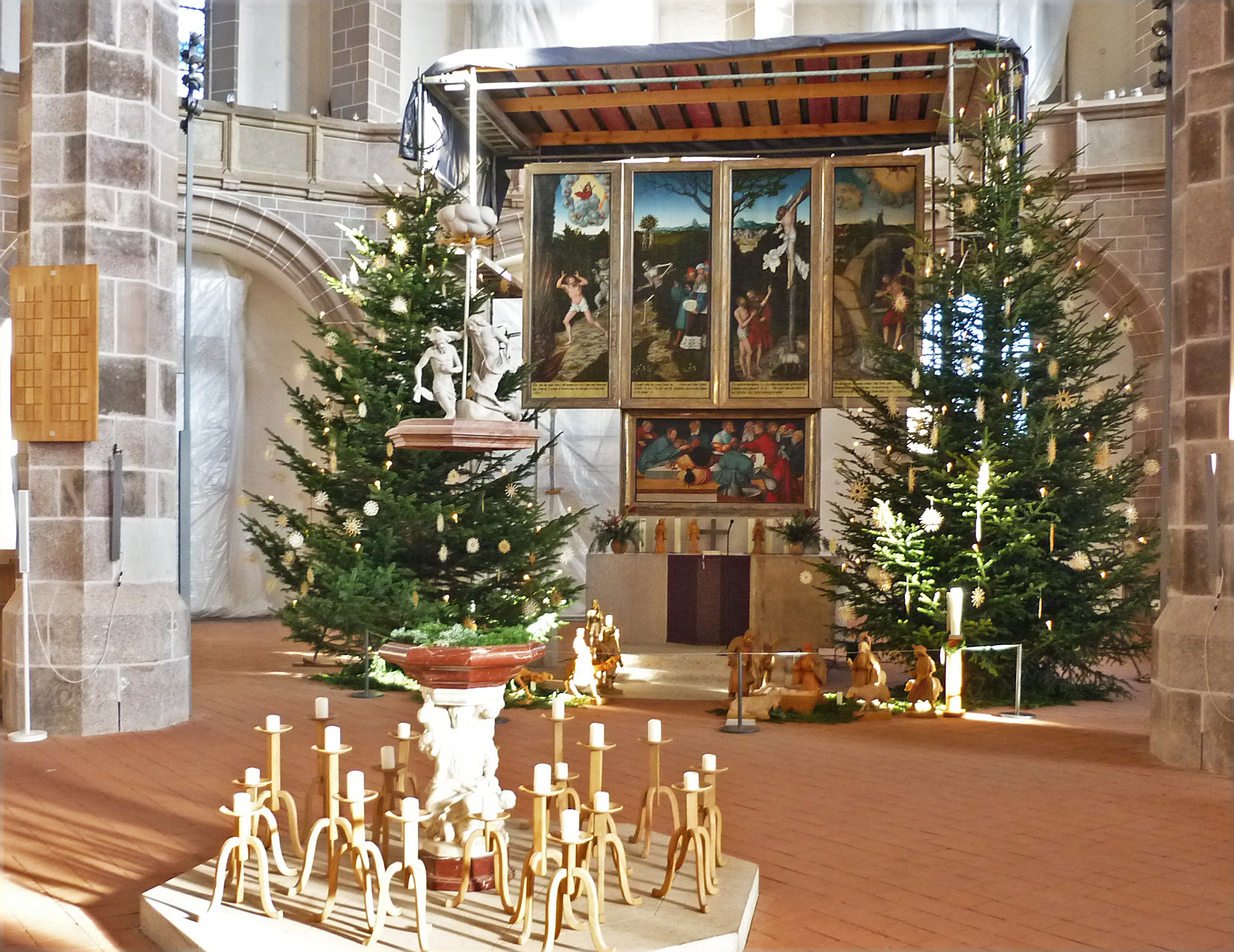
Baptismal font and altar

== See also ==
- Wittenberg Altarpiece
- Weimar Altarpiece
