= Wittenberg Altarpiece =

Altarpiece by both Lucas Cranachs

Wittenberg Cranach Altarpiece
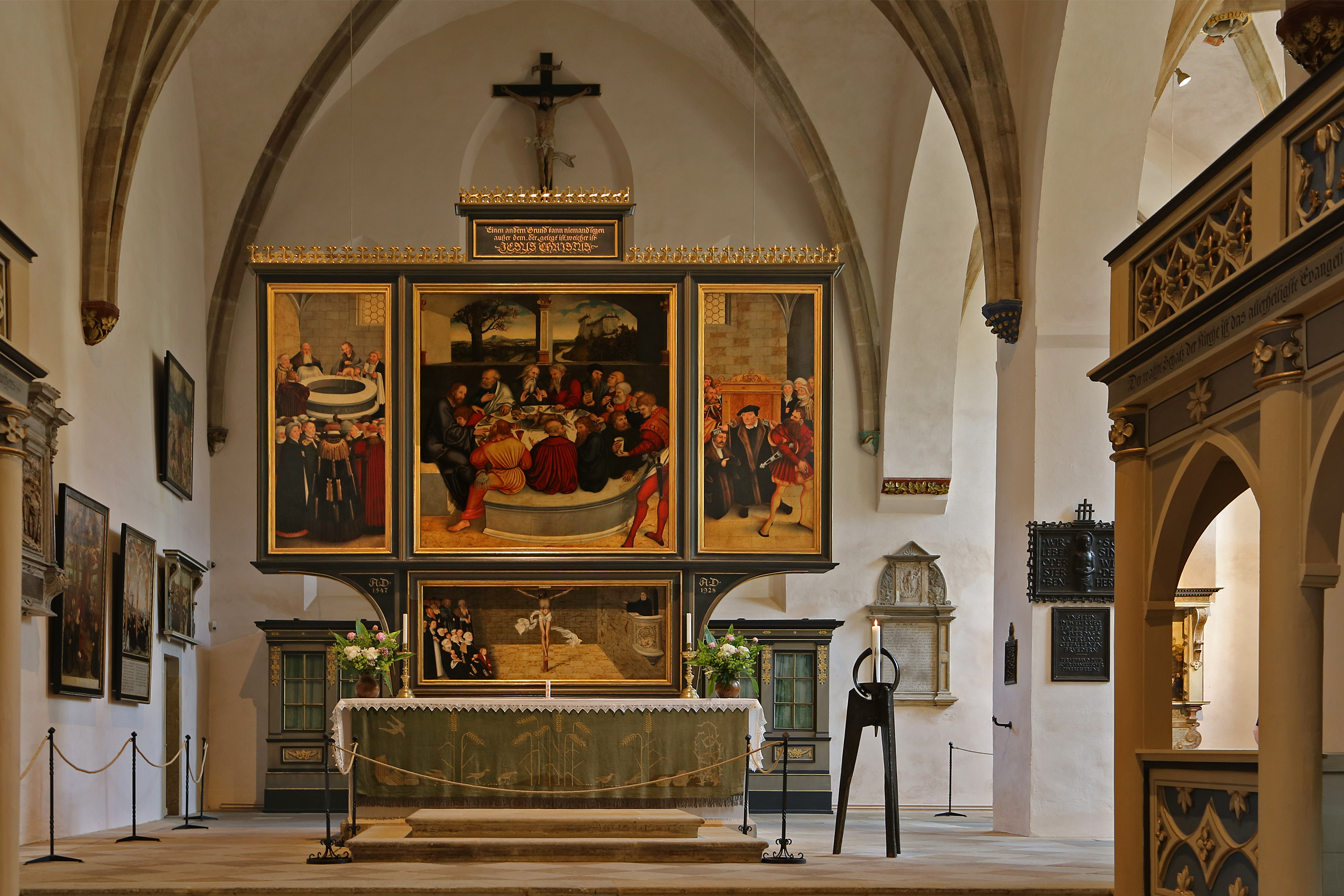
- St. Mary's Church in Wittenberg with Cranach Altarpiece
- Artist: Lucas Cranach the Elder and Lucas Cranach the Younger
- Year: 1547
- Medium: Oil on hardwood
- Movement: German Renaissance
- Dimensions: 103.5 cm × 233 cm (40.7 in × 92 in)
- Location: Wittenberg
- Owner: Evangelical Lutheran City and Parish Church of St.Mary's in Wittenberg

Wittenberg Cranach Altarpiece (or Reformation Altarpiece) is one of the major Lutheran winged altarpieces created by Lucas Cranach the Elder and his son Lucas Cranach the Younger for the Evangelical Lutheran City and Parish Church of St. Mary's in Wittenberg, Germany. The altarpiece depicts the key figures of Lutheranism associated with the parish church of Wittenberg.

The Schneeberg Altarpiece, Weimar Altarpiece and Gotha Altarpiece are other important examples of the relatively small number of attempts to continue the tradition of the altarpiece giving an explicitly Lutheran interpretation. This phase was mostly finished by 1555.

== History and description ==
The triptych altarpiece was installed at the high altar of the Wittenberg City Parish Church of St. Mary's in 1547, one year after Luther's death, and it is believed to be consecrated by Johannes Bugenhagen, who was the pastor at St. Mary's church in Wittenberg and a good friend of Martin Luther. Lucas Cranach the Elder designed the altar and painted most of the front panel, while his son Lucas Cranach the Younger painted the panels on the back and finished his father's work on the front. The altarpiece was restored in 2016.

== Interpretation of the altarpiece ==
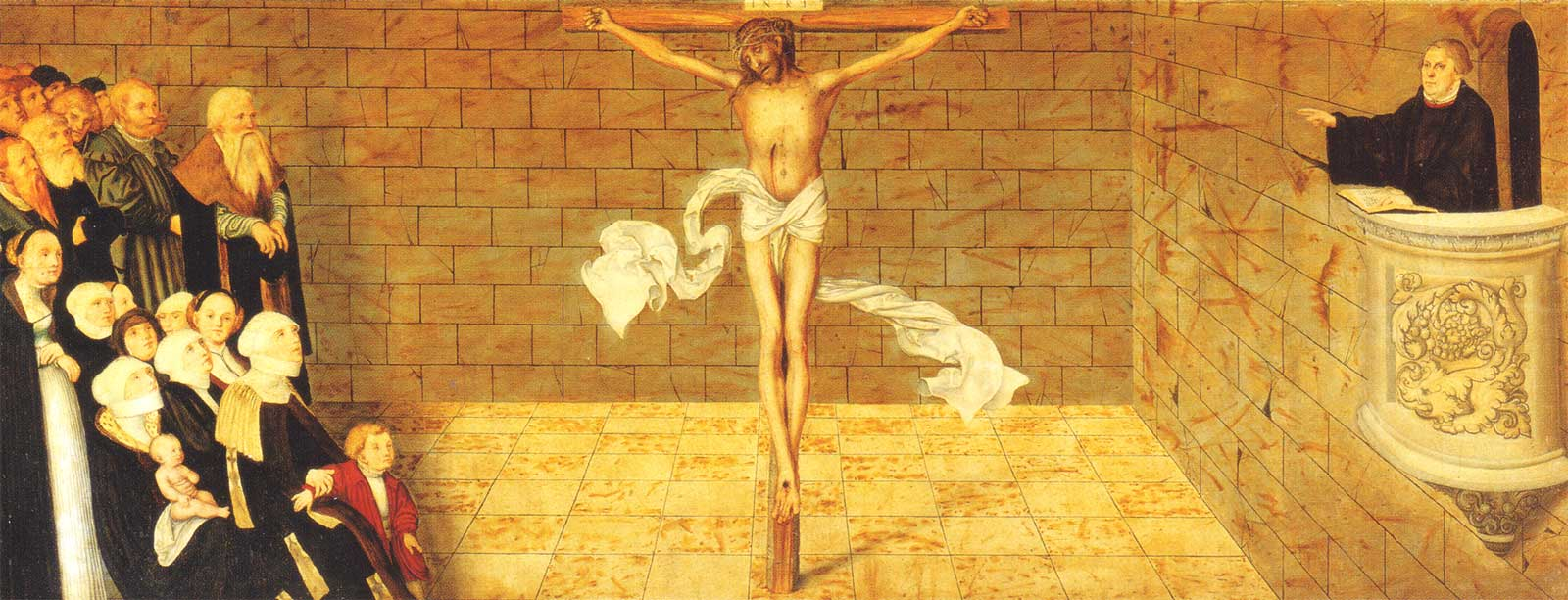
Martin Luther preaching with crucified Christ depicted on the predella embodies Luther's theology of Solus Christus

The Wittenberg altarpiece is a visualization of several major principles of the Protestant Reformation, and serves as a portrayal of Lutheran sacramental theology. On the front, the middle panel and the inner two wings depict the three sacraments recognized by Luther, namely the Baptism, Eucharist and Absolution. The frontal middle panel depicts Jesus Christ instituting the Lord's Supper with Martin Luther portrayed as one of the apostles, and sitting next to Luther on the left is the printer Hans Lufft, who published the Luther Bible. In the left inner wing, Philipp Melanchthon baptizes a baby, in accordance with the Lutheran affirmation of infant baptism, assisted by two godparents; the godfather depicted on the left is Lucas Cranach the Elder. The inner right panel depicts Johannes Bugenhagen, the pastor of this church at the time of the painting, absolving one man's sins (referred to as the Office of the Keys), and excluding another man who is impenitent. On the predella, Martin Luther is shown delivering a sermon and preaching the Word of God, a central tenet of Reformation, with crucified Christ depicted in the middle in reference to Christocentric nature of the new faith; Luther's wife Katharina von Bora is shown among the congregants. On the back panel, the risen Christ in glory is depicted in the middle, with side panels depicting the Old Testament narratives of Abraham's sacrifice and Moses with the Brazen Serpent.

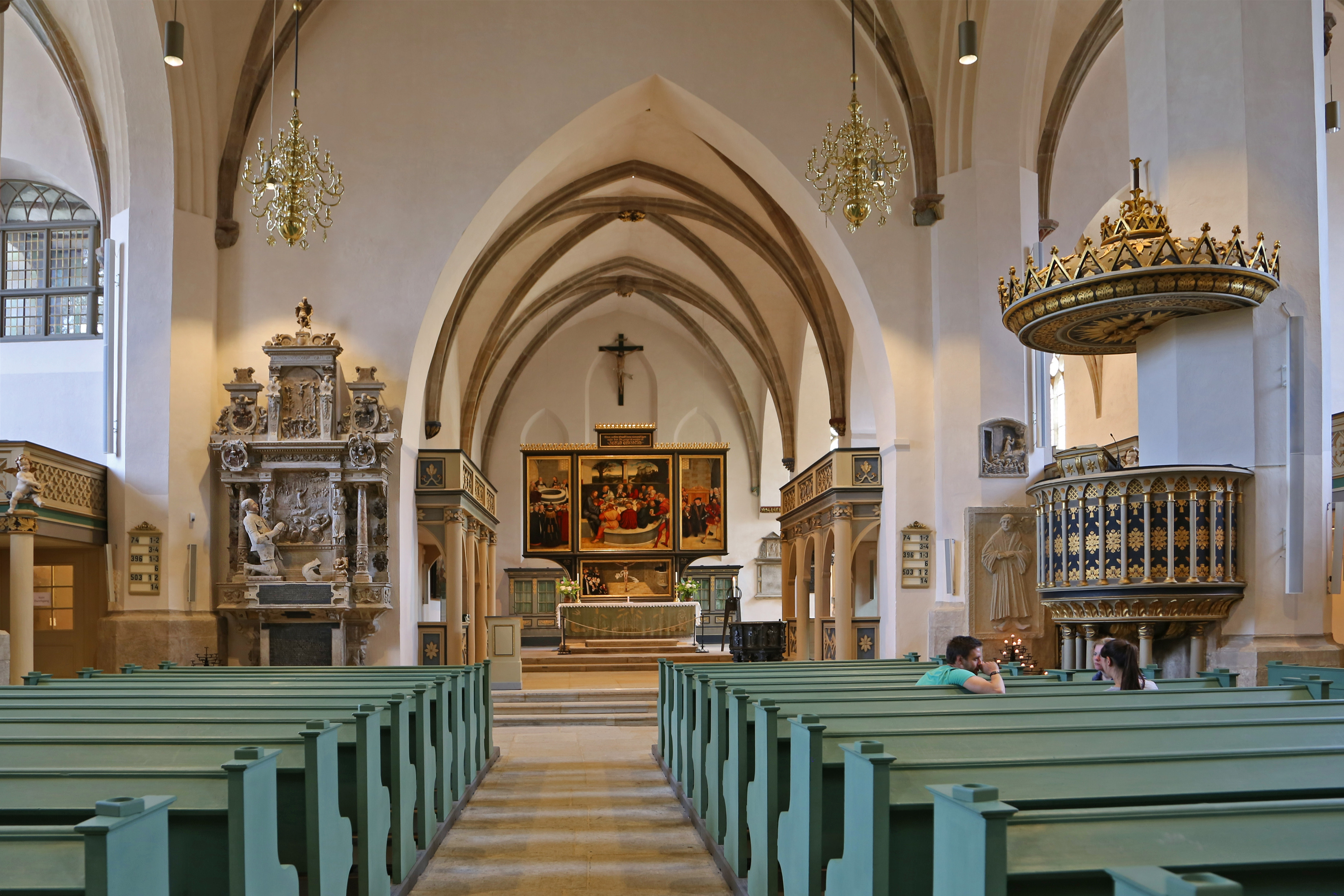
Interior of St. Mary's Church in Wittenberg

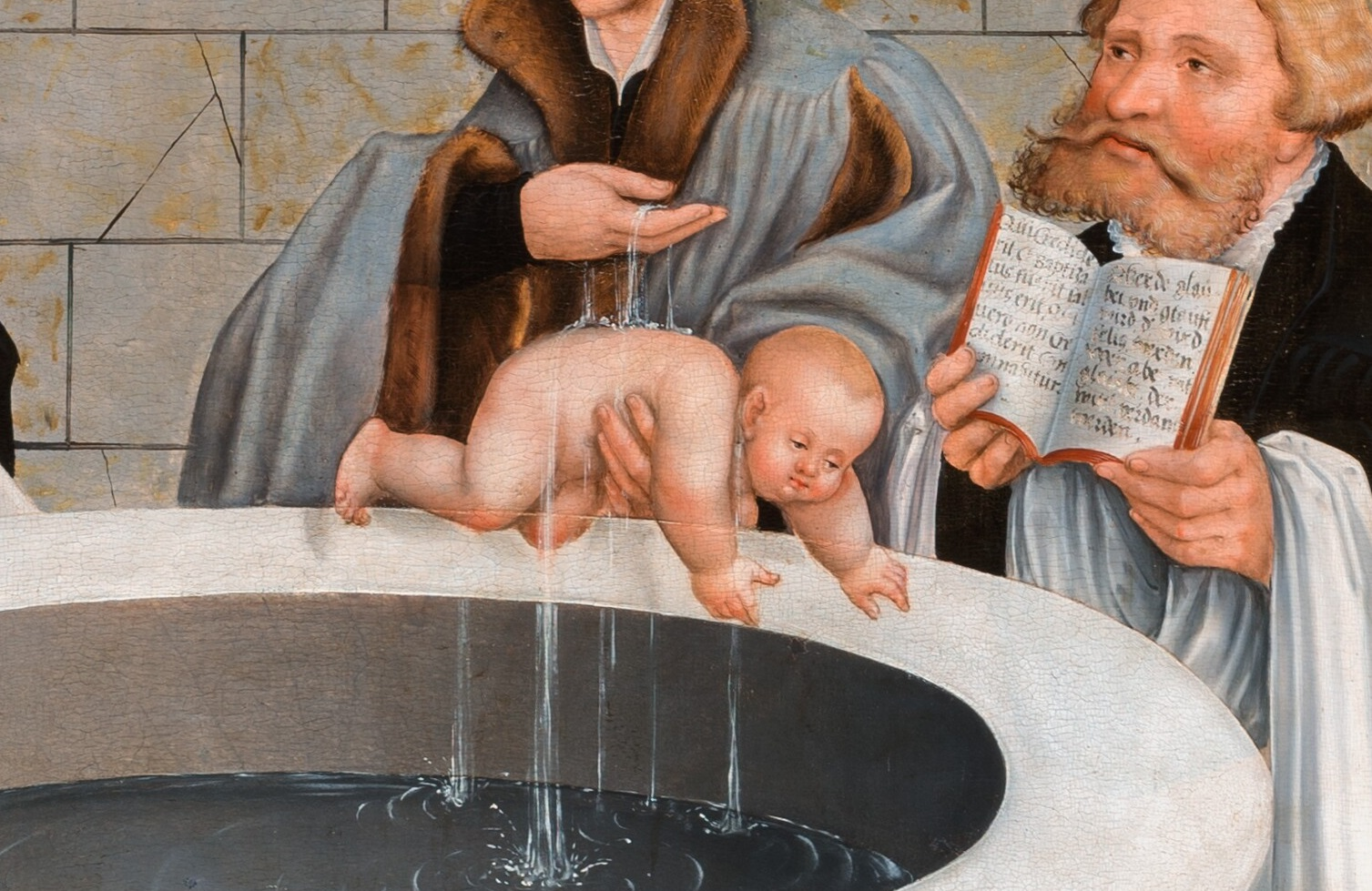
Detail of Philipp Melanchthon baptizing an infant

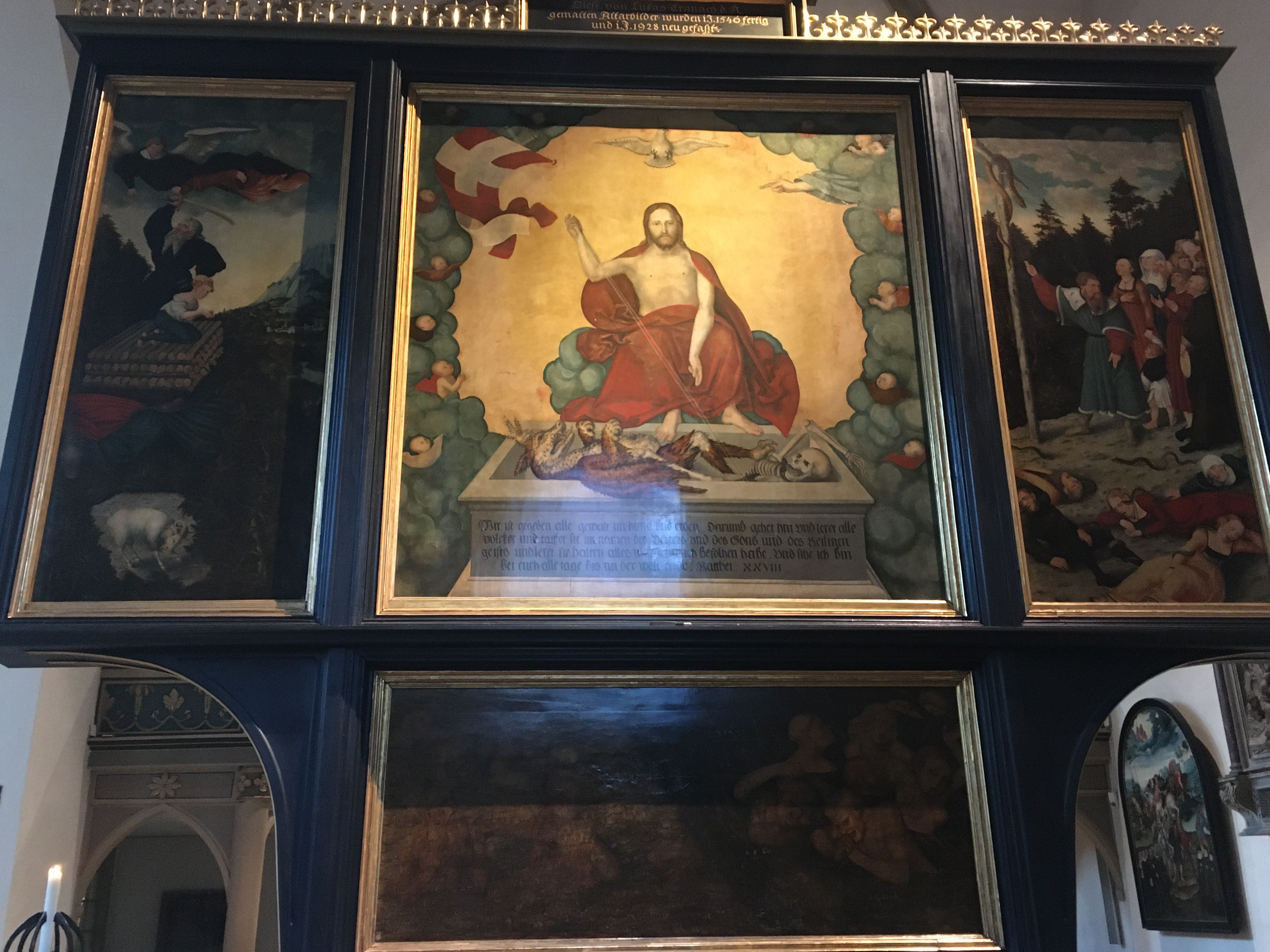
The back panel depicts the resurrected Christ defeating death

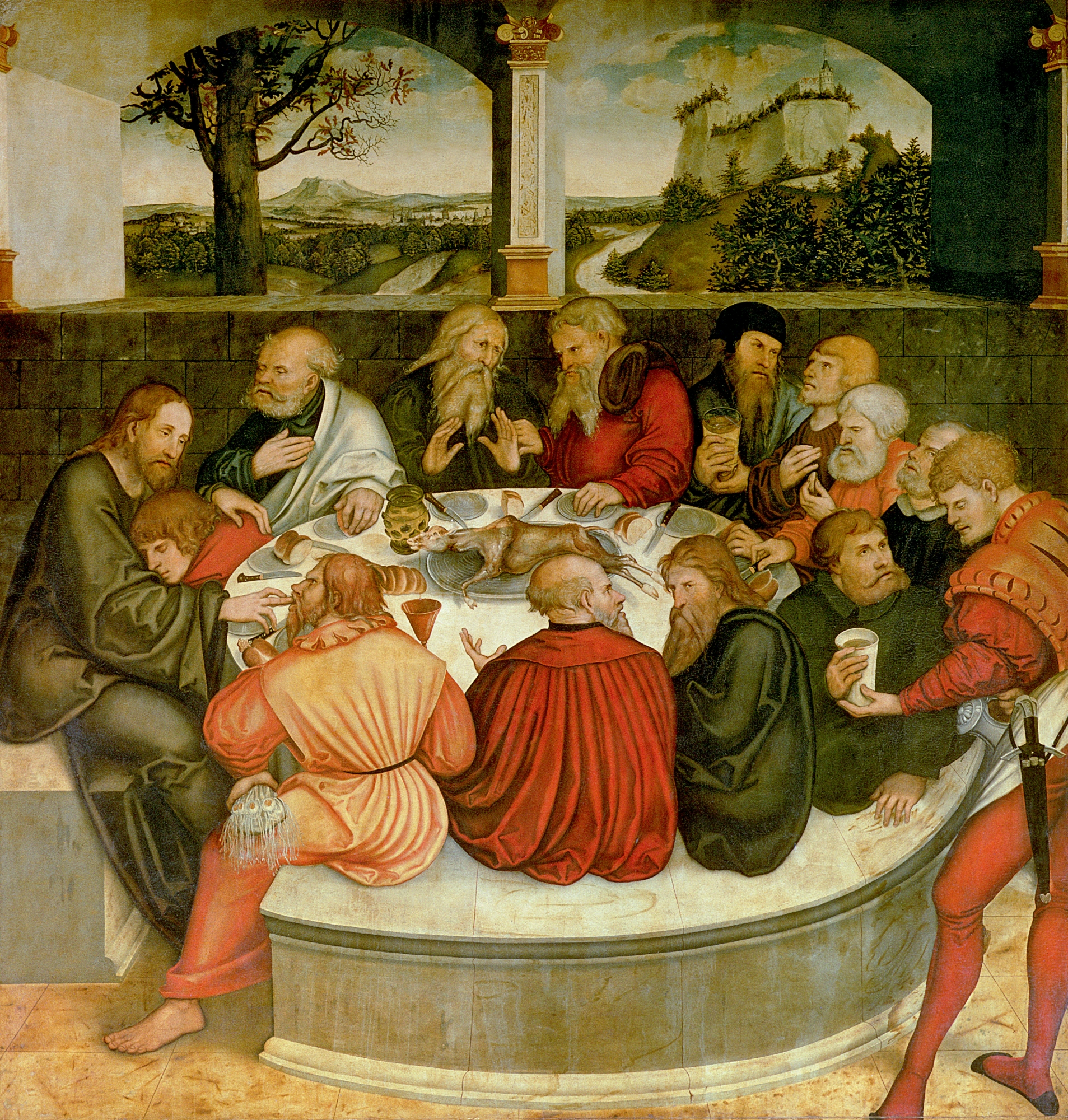
Detail of the Last Supper scene

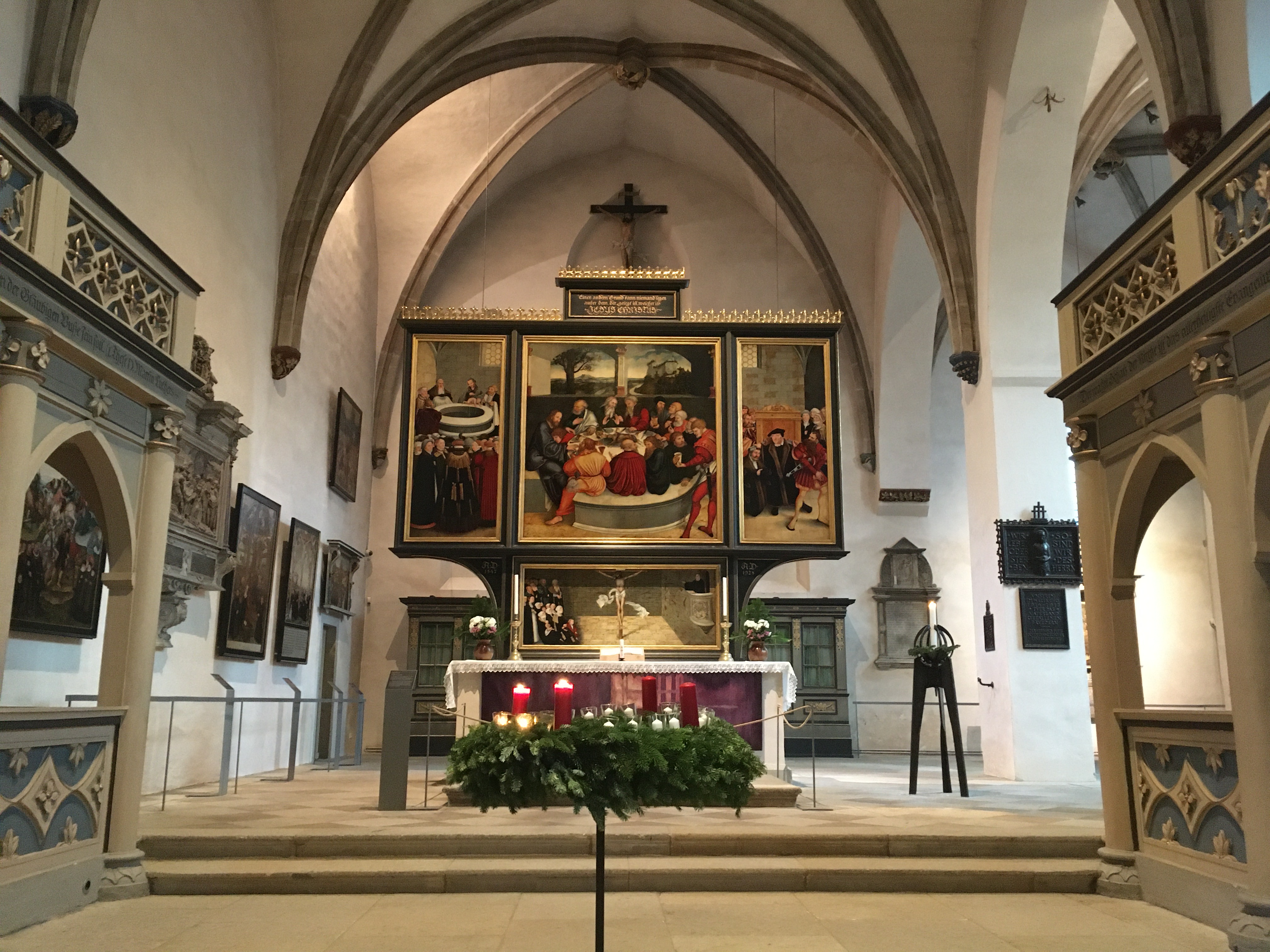
Wittenberg altarpiece in full view with the chancel and choir of St. Mary's Church

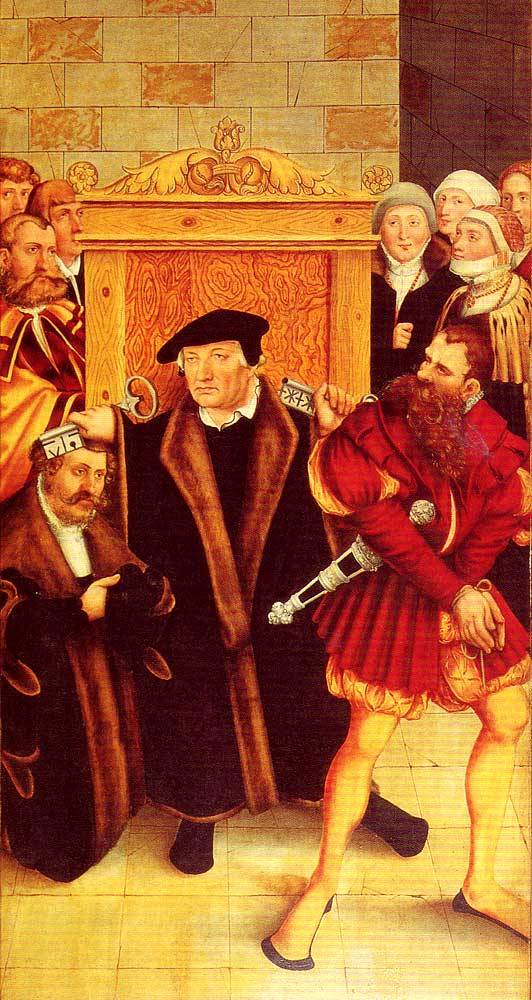
Johannes Bugenhagen as the pastor of St. Mary's Church
