= Weimar Altarpiece =

16th C triptych painted alterpiece

Weimar Cranach Altarpiece
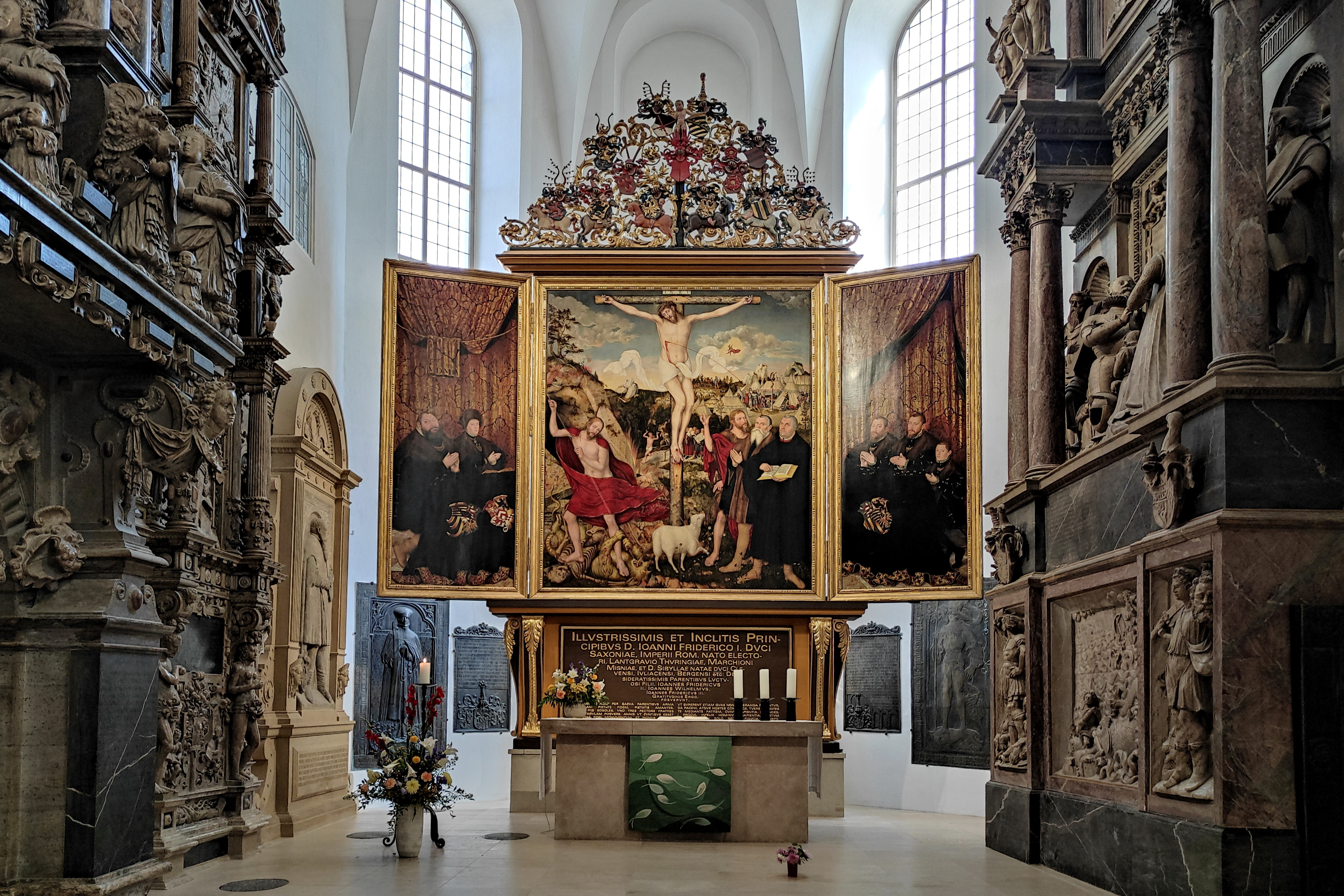
- Chancel of St. Peter und Paul in Weimar with Cranach Altarpiece
- Artist: Lucas Cranach the Elder and Lucas Cranach the Younger
- Year: 1555
- Medium: Limewood
- Movement: German Renaissance
- Dimensions: 370 cm × 309 cm (150 in × 122 in)
- Location: Weimar
- Owner: Evangelical Lutheran Parish Church of St. Peter und Paul in Weimar

Weimar Cranach Altarpiece (or Herderkirche Weimar Cranach Altarpiece) is a Lutheran winged altarpiece created by Lucas Cranach the Elder and his son Lucas Cranach the Younger between 1552 and 1555 for the Church of St. Peter und Paul in Weimar, Germany.

== History and description ==
The triptych altarpiece was commissioned by the Elector of Saxony John Frederick I and installed at the high altar of the city parish church of St. Peter und Paul in Weimar in 1555, thus making it one of the major Protestant altarpieces of Reformation, made by Cranachs. The painting of the three-winged altarpiece was started by Lucas Cranach the Elder and upon his father's death, the task was completed by the son Lucas Cranach the Younger in 1555. It is one of the most important Thuringian masterpieces of art produced in the 16th century. The chancel area houses the authentic grave slab of Lucas Cranach the Elder, who now rests at Jacobsfriedhof. During World War II, the altarpiece was stored elsewhere, and therefore survived the air raids of 1945.

== Interpretation of the altarpiece ==
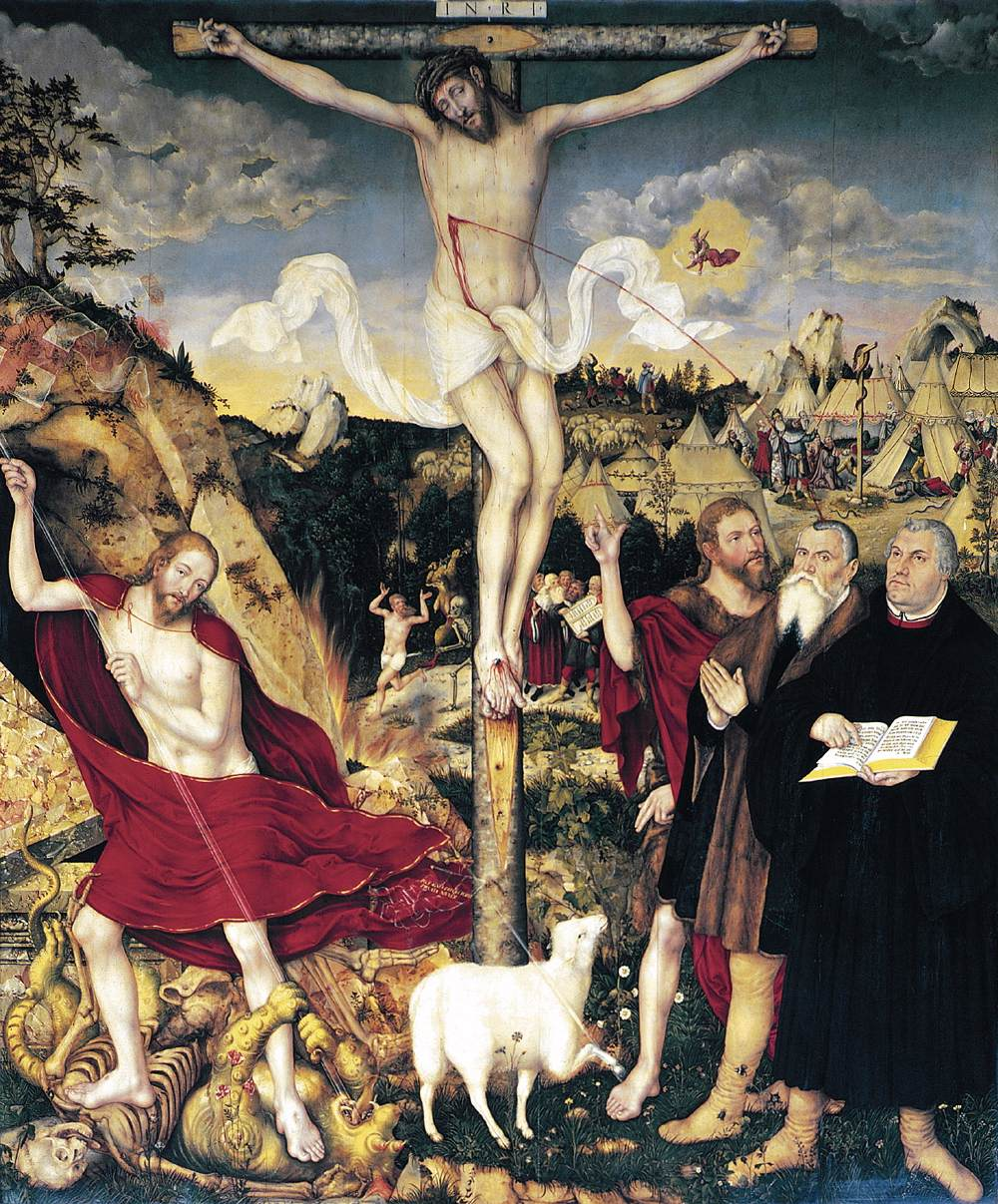
Detailed image of the central piece of altar

As in almost all cases of Cranach Post-Reformation altarpieces, there is also a great deal of Christocentric Lutheran symbolism, Christian allegory and Protestant theological concept of Five solas depicted in the Weimar altarpiece, with each image referring to salvation alone in Jesus, emphasizing the sacrifice of Jesus in Solus Christus. The altarpiece is Christ-centered with main focus on the crucified Christ with John the Baptist pointing up at Jesus and index finger from his other hand to the Agnus Dei, while Lucas Cranach the Elder and Martin Luther are standing on the right side. Christ's image is repeated on the left side, he is depicted defeating Satan and conquering death. Cranach is depicted being washed by the blood of Jesus, while there is an open Bible in Luther's hand with his index finger pointing at the Bible to signify the importance of preaching of the Word of God and the doctrine of Sola scriptura. In the background, the fallen nature of mankind is depicted through a scene of the Expulsion from the Garden of Eden, along with the Old Testament narrative of the revelation of the Ten Commandments, the Brazen Serpent, Moses preaching to Israelites and Annunciation to the shepherds. When the triptych is closed, the outer sides of the wings depict the Biblical scenes of Baptism of Jesus and Resurrection.The altarpiece also serves as a grave monument to John Frederick I, his wife Sibylle of Cleves and their descendants who were laid to rest beneath the vault in front of the altar, with their names carved on the predella in the form of an epitaph and their images depicted on the outer wings of the triptych.

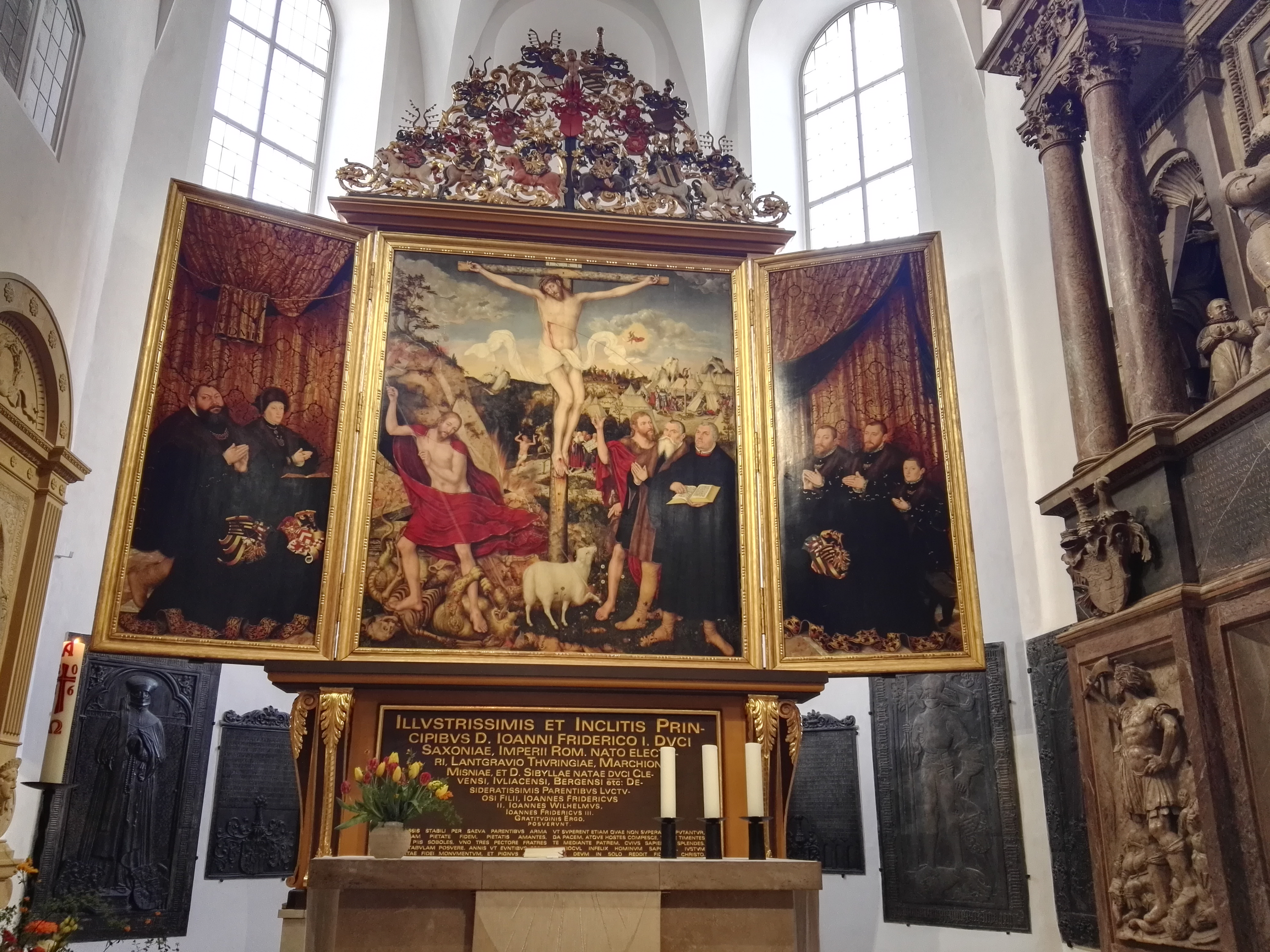
Weimar altarpiece close-up

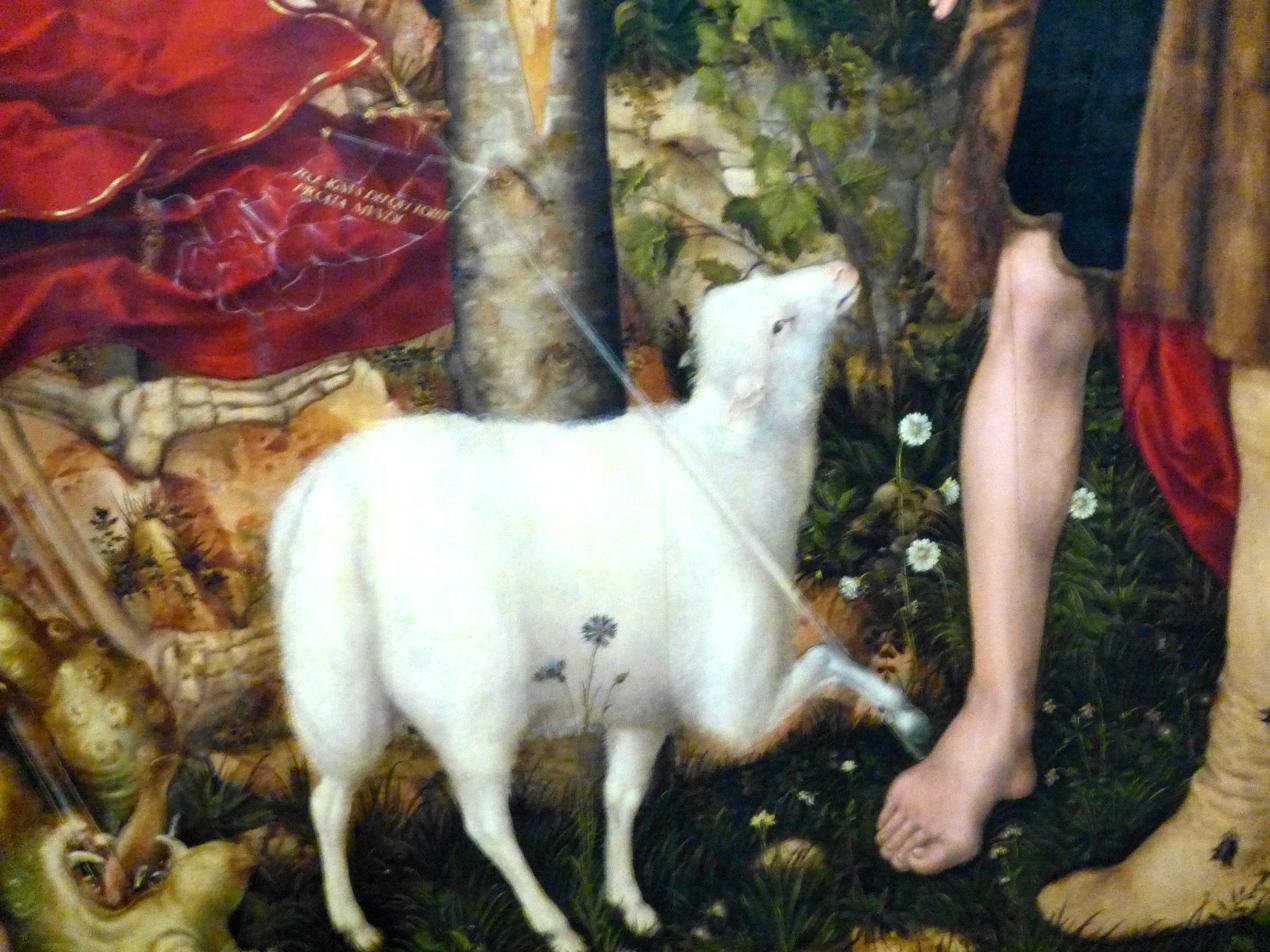
Agnus Dei detail

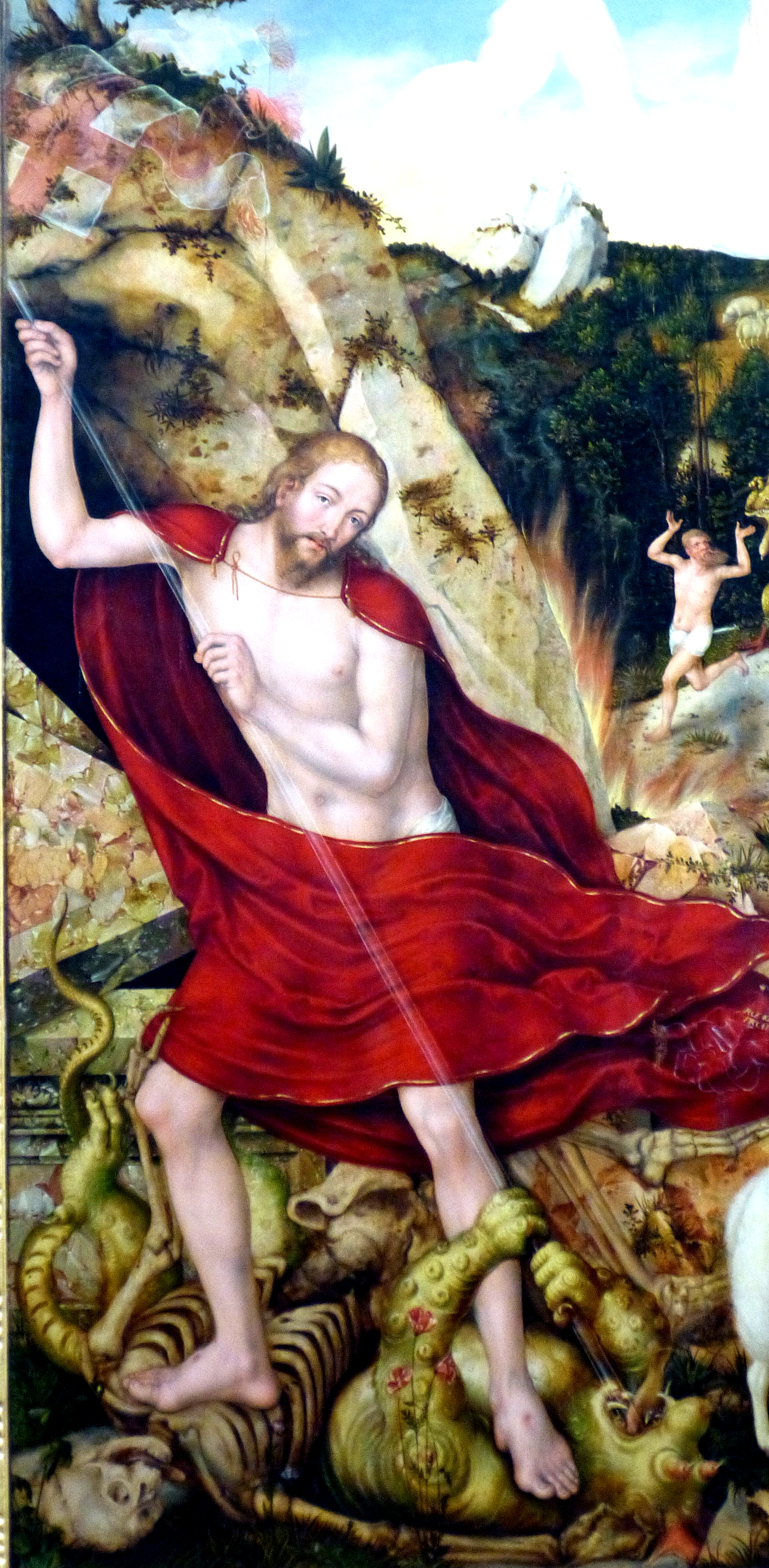
Resurrected Christ conquering death

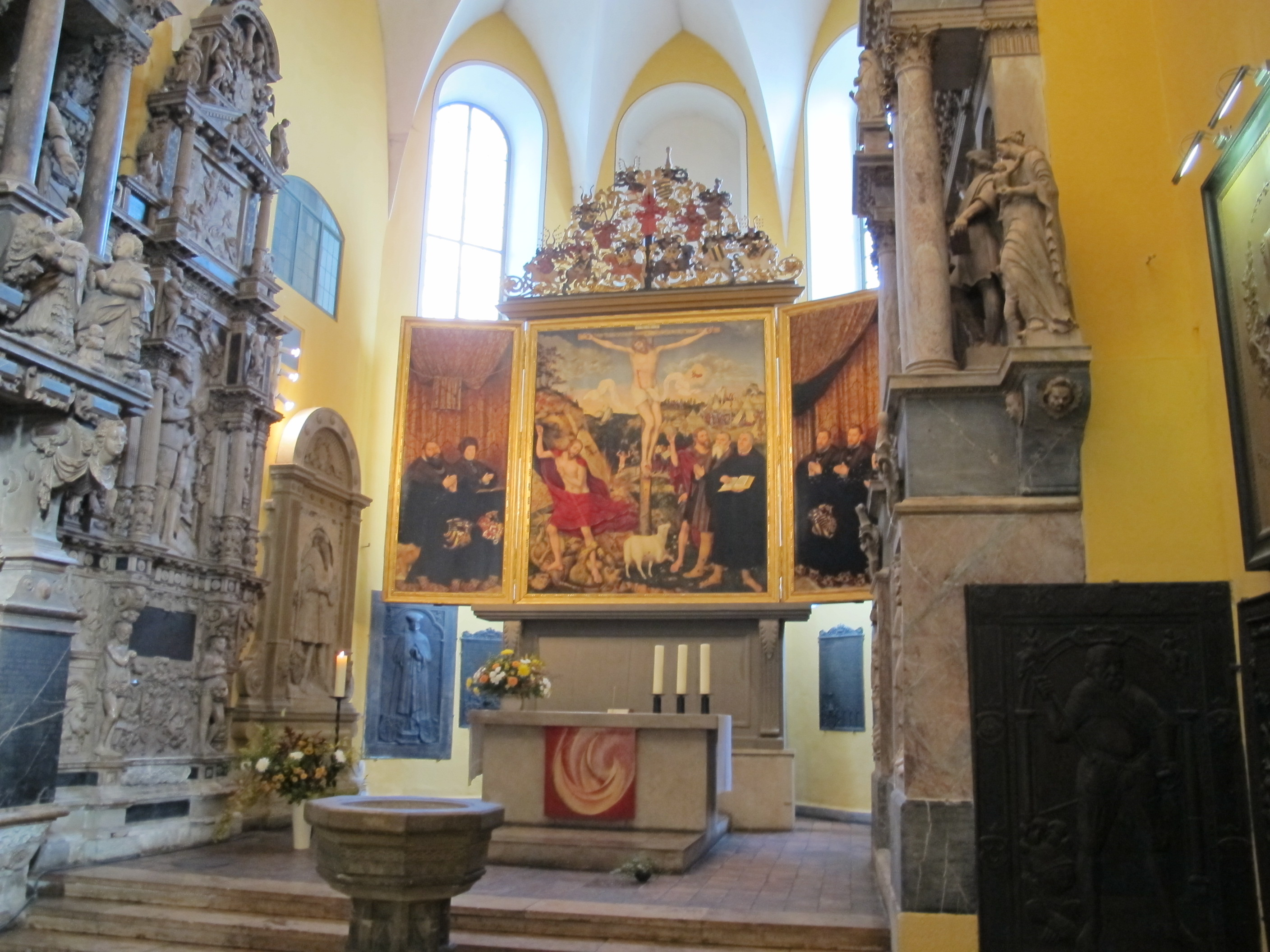
Chancel of the church with altar and baptismal font

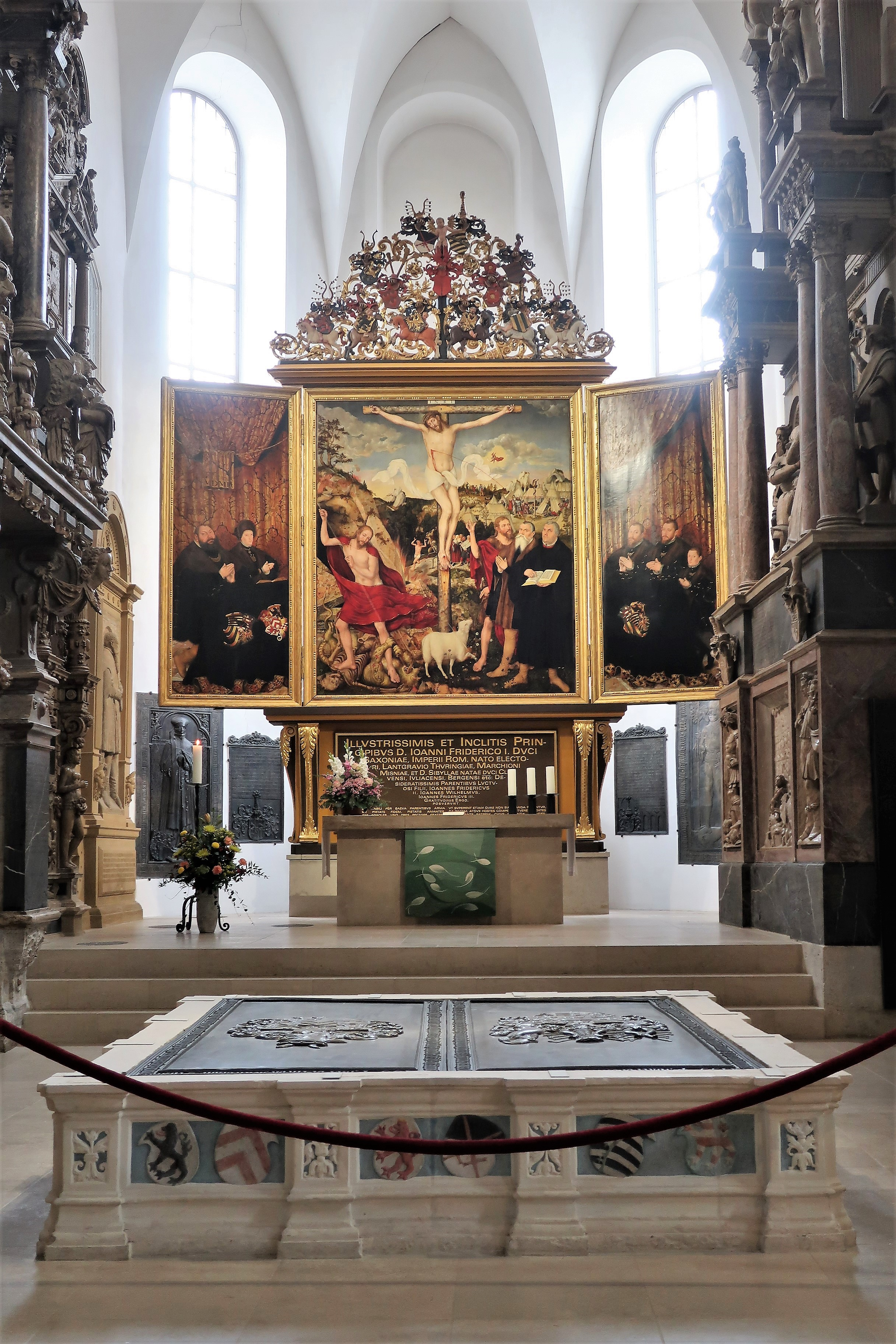
Weimar altarpiece with the sight of the ducal burial vault in the front

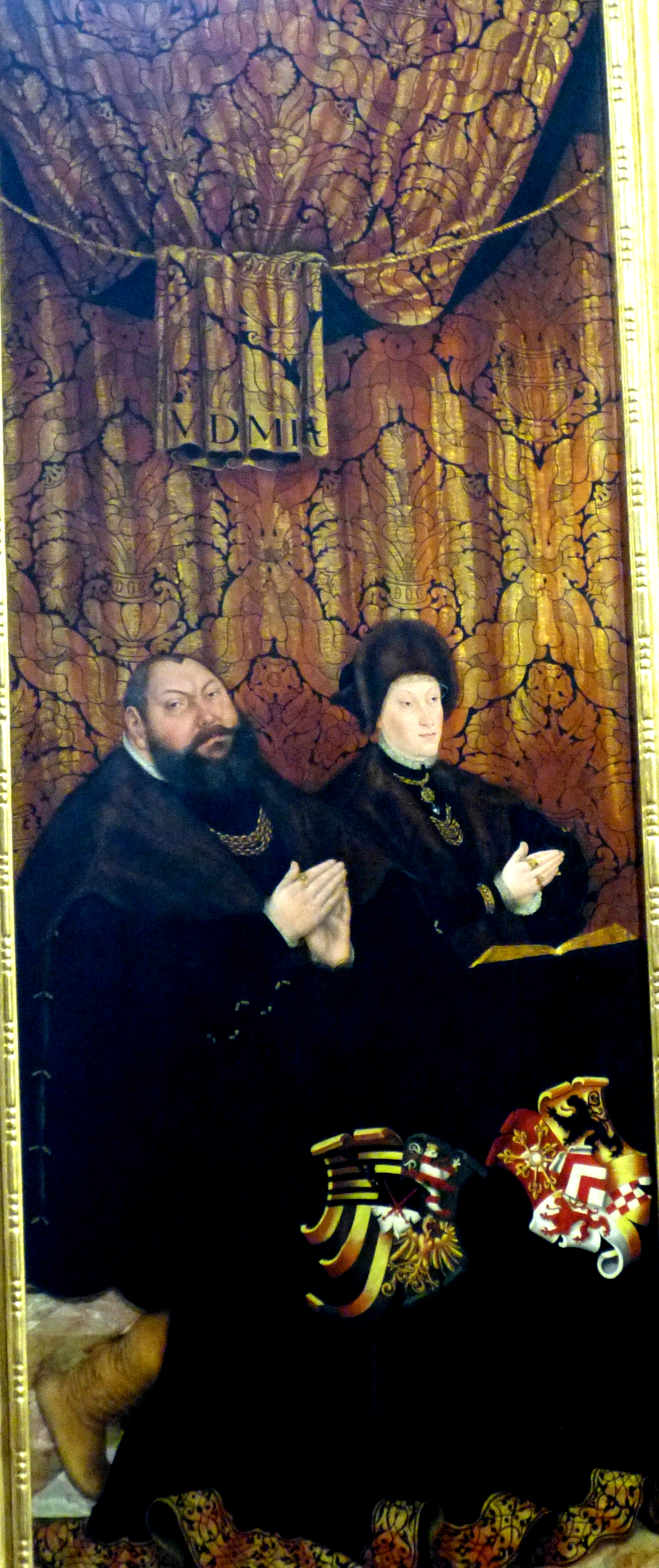
Elector of Saxony John Frederick I and his wife Sibylle of Cleves in prayer

== See also ==
- Wittenberg Altarpiece
- Schneeberg Altarpiece
