= Schneeberg, Saxony =

Schneeberg
- Town
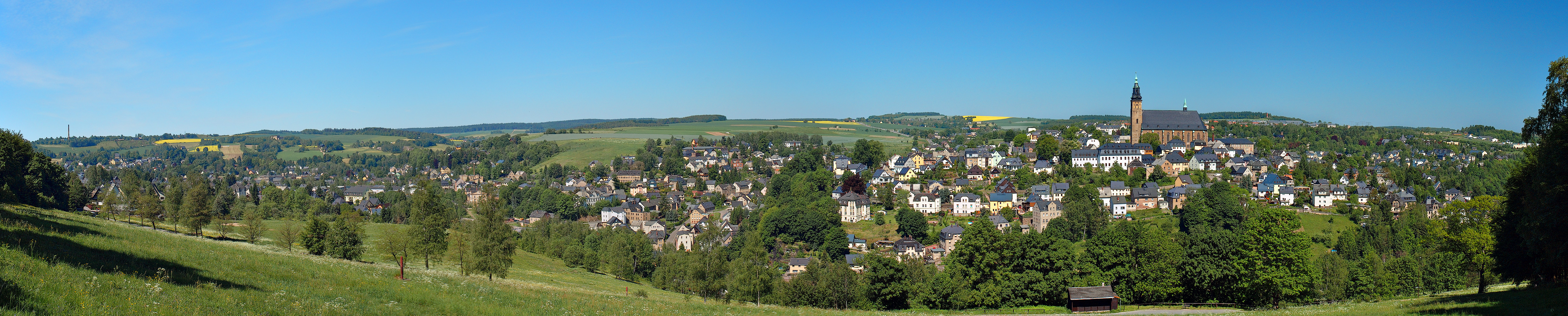

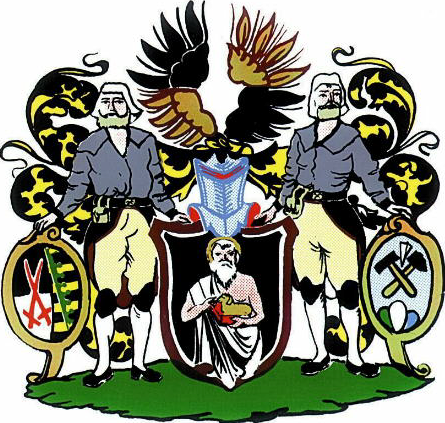
- Coat of arms

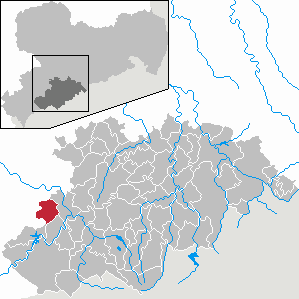
- Location of Schneeberg within Erzgebirgskreis district
- Interactive map of Schneeberg
- Location within Germany Location within Saxony
- Coordinates: 50°35′39″N 12°38′44″E
- Country: Germany
- State: Saxony
- District: Erzgebirgskreis

Government
  - Mayor (2022–29): Ingo Seifert

Area
  - Total: 23.35 km^{2} (9.02 sq mi)
- Elevation: 470 m (1,540 ft)

Population (2025-12-31)
  - Total: 13,372
  - Density: 572.7/km^{2} (1,483/sq mi)
- Time zone: UTC+01:00 (CET)
  - Summer (DST): UTC+02:00 (CEST)
- Postal codes: 08289
- Dialling codes: 03772
- Vehicle registration: ERZ, ANA, ASZ, AU, MAB, MEK, STL, SZB, ZP
- Website: www.schneeberg.de

Schneeberg (German pronunciation: [ˈʃneːbɛʁk]) is a town in Saxony’s district of Erzgebirgskreis. It has roughly 16,400 inhabitants and belongs to the Town League of Silberberg (Städtebund Silberberg). It lies 4 km west of Aue, and 17 kilometres (11 mi) southeast of Zwickau.

== Geography ==
=== Location ===
Schneeberg lies on the Silver Road in the upper western Ore Mountains. Visible from afar is the prominent church of St. Wolfgang. The heart of the town lies on the Schneeberg, which reaches 470 metres above sea level and is also the town’s namesake. Among the surrounding peaks are the Gleesberg (593 m) to the east and the Keilberg (557 m) to the north.

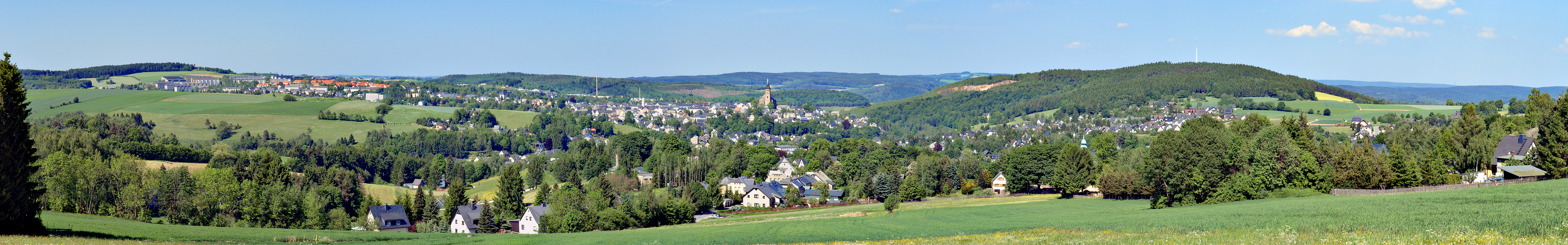
View of the town from the southwest

== History ==
Map of Schneebach and the surrounding area (around 1770)

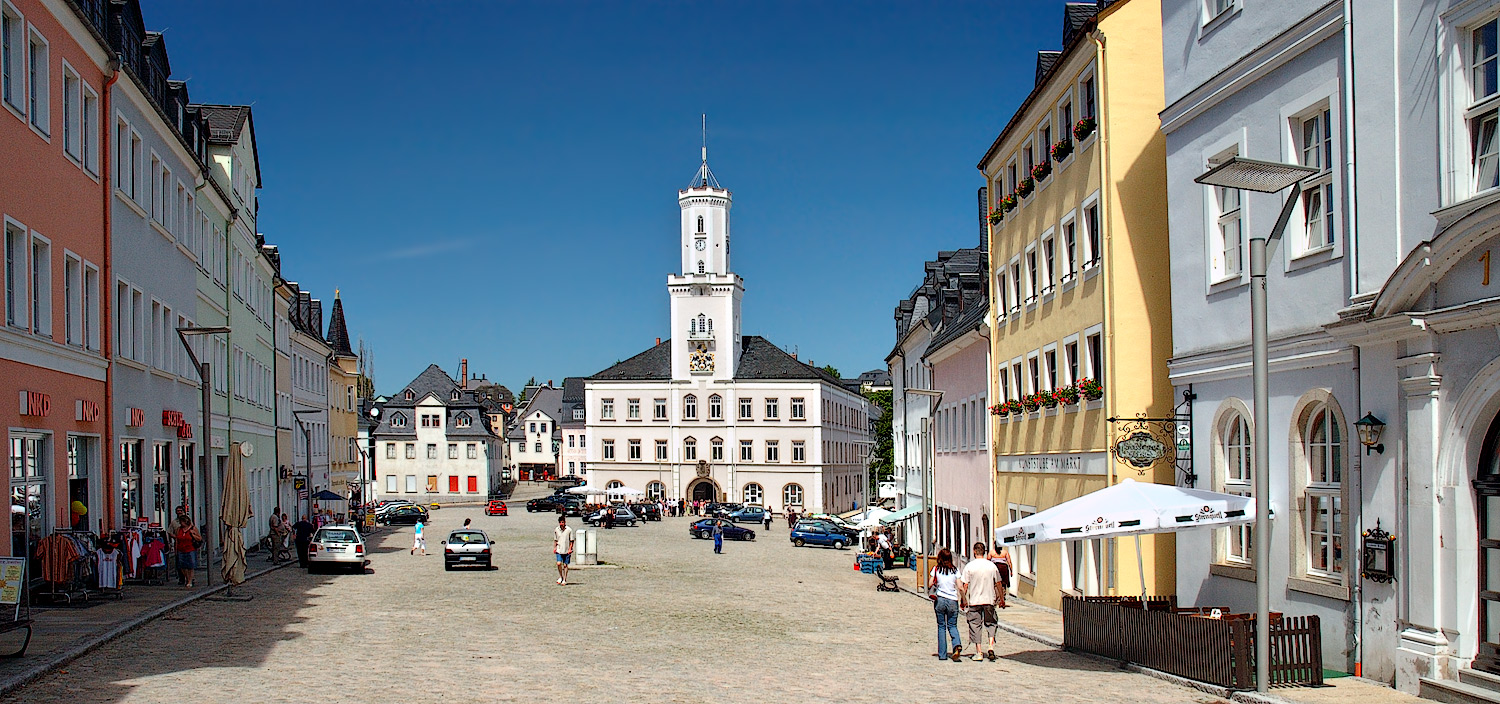
Marketplace with Town Hall

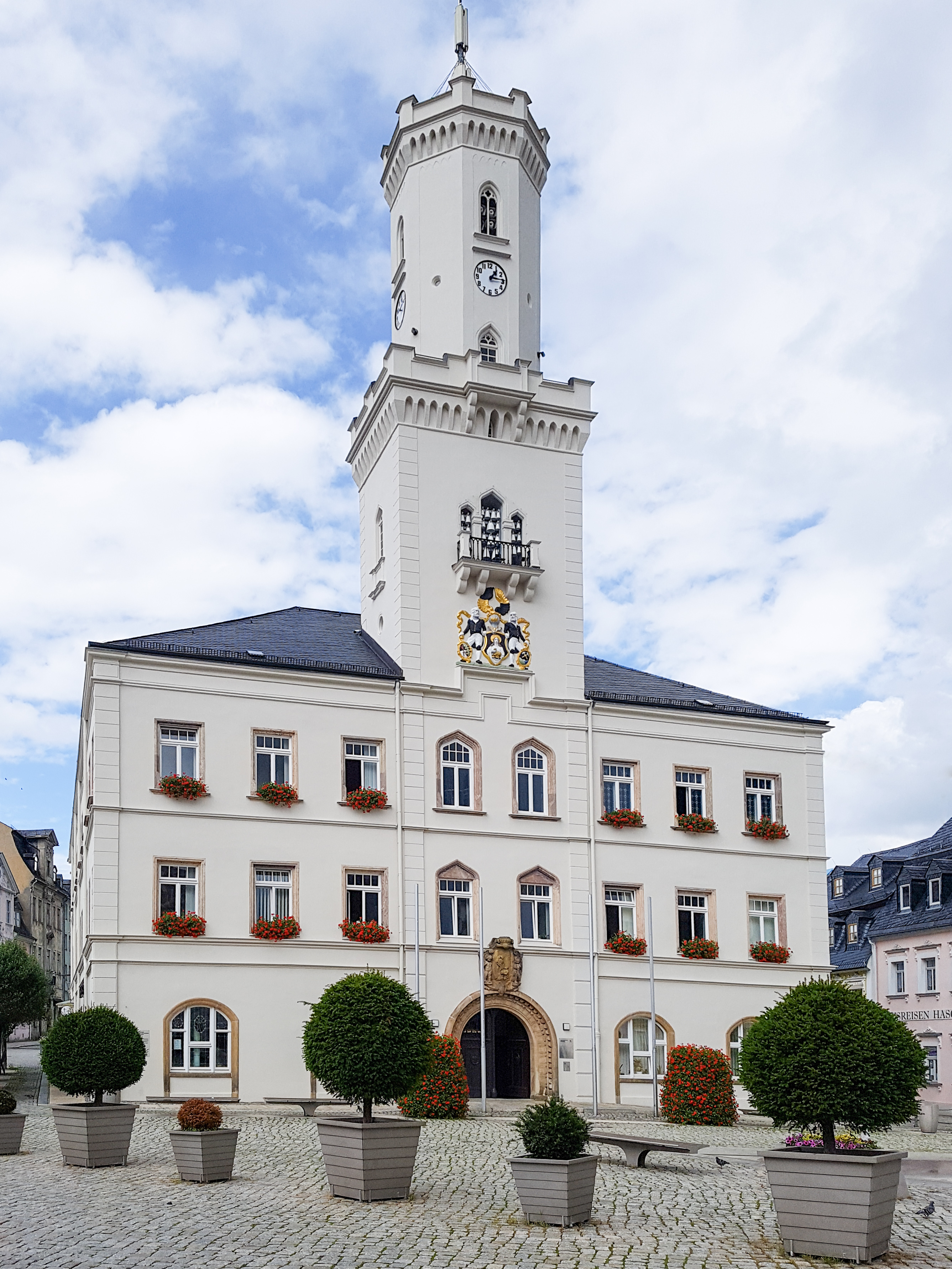
Town Hall, Summer 2021

Schneeberg’s more than 500-year-long history has been shaped by mining more than anything else, laying the very groundwork for the town’s founding. The original silver mining also yielded cobalt and bismuth mining by the mid 16th century. When uranium mining was being undertaken between 1946 and 1958, the town’s population quickly rose, leading to Schneeberg’s status as a district-free town (kreisfreie Stadt) between 1952 and 1958. Afterwards it once again belonged to the district of Aue. Between 1952 and 1990, Schneeberg was part of the Bezirk Karl-Marx-Stadt of East Germany.

=== Amalgamations ===
- 1939 Bergstadt Neustädtel, near which lies the popular outing destinations Gleesberg and Filzteich.
- 1952 Community of Griesbach, northwest of Schneeberg
- 1999 Community of Lindenau

=== Population development ===
Development of population figures (as of 1960 on 31 December):

- 1834 - 6,912
- 1946 - 13,602^{1}
- 1950 - 32,932^{2}
- 1960 - 21,561
- 1971 - 20,889
- 1981 - 21,174
- 1984 - 22,318
- 2002 - 17,383
- 2003 - 17,541
- 2004 - 16,632
- 2005 - 16,568
- 2006 - 16,380

^{1} 29 October
^{2} 31 August

== Culture and sightseeing ==
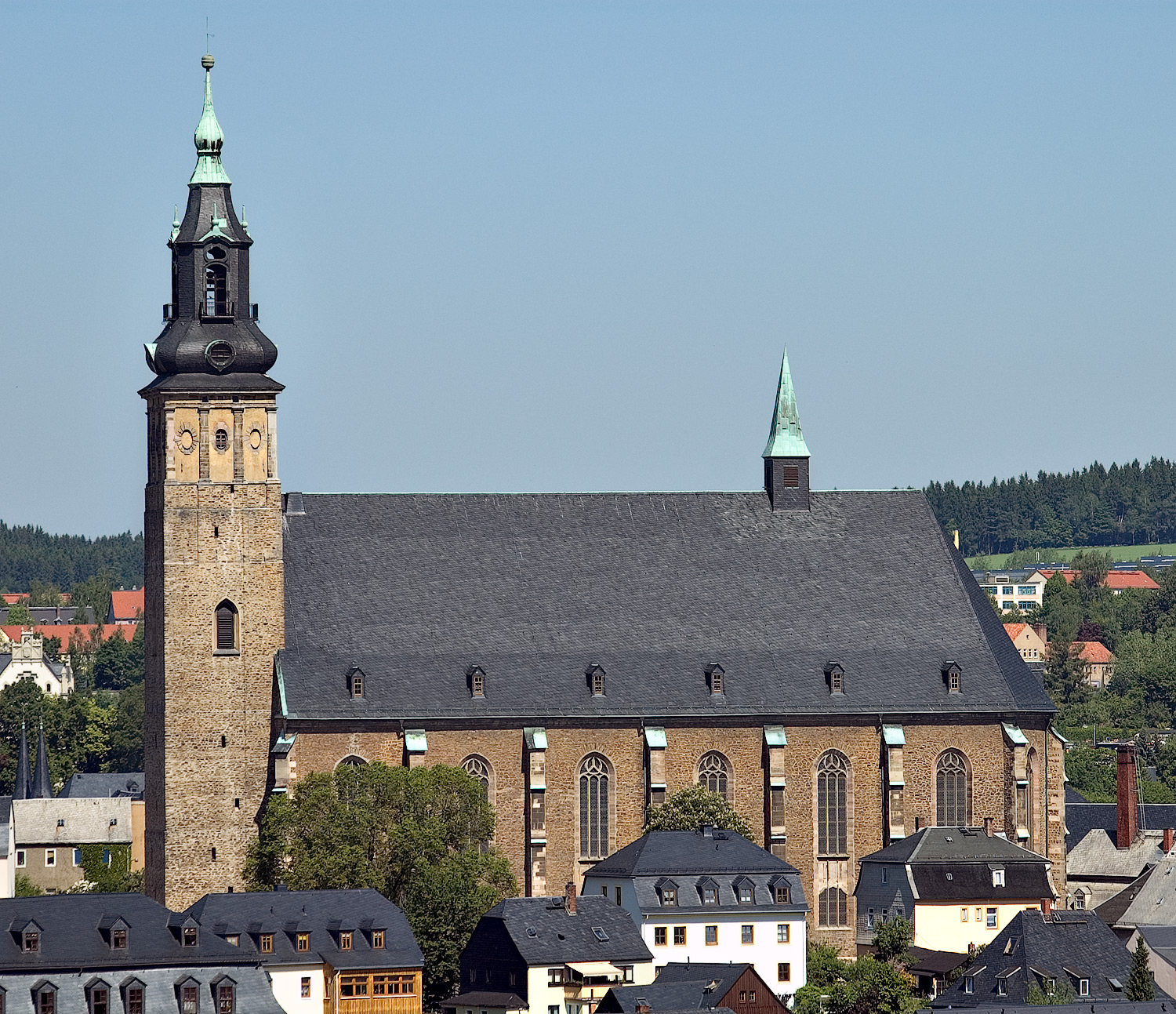
St. Wolfgangskirche

The St. Wolfgangskirche is one of the biggest and architecturally most mature churches built in the Late Gothic style, and is an earlier type of Reformation church construction. Inside are found works by Lucas Cranach the Elder and the Crodel family of painters, whom the Krodel-Brunnen (fountain), demolished in late 2005, commemorated.

Among the other sights to be seen are the neo-Gothic Town Hall, newly built in the mid 19th century, various Baroque buildings and mining memorials.

== Economy and infrastructure ==
=== Transport ===
In Schneeberg ends Bundesstraße (Federal Highway) 93 from Leipzig, which once led further, across the border, to Karlsbad (now Karlovy Vary in the Czech Republic). Furthermore, Bundesstraße 169 runs through the town from Plauen to Chemnitz.

From 1859 to 1952, the town had a railway connection afforded by a 5-km-long spur leading to Niederschlema on the Zwickau-Schwarzenberg-Johanngeorgenstadt-Karlsbad railway line.

Albert motorcycles were manufactured in Schneeberg by Theodore Albert between 1922 and 1924. They featured 183cc two-stroke engines.

=== State institutions ===
Schneeberg was until 31 March 2008 headquarters of the Bundeswehr’s Gebirgsjägerbataillon (“Mountain Rangers’ Battalion”) 571 and Versorgungskompanie (“Supply Company”) 370.

=== Education ===
Schneeberg had at its disposal a lyceum, out of which grew a Gymnasium. Moreover, the town was home to a lace tatting school, an art school, a vocational Gymnasium and a teachers’ college. Schneeberg's Johann-Gottfried-Herder Gymnasium was chosen in 2004–2005 as “Saxony’s best Gymnasium” in the course of a study by the magazine Capital. It enjoys an outstanding reputation even beyond Germany's borders.

== Notable people ==
- Andreas Musculus (1514–1581), professor at the university of Frankfurt an der Oder and Generalsuperintendent of the Margraviate of Brandenburg
- Ambrosius Lobwasser (1515–1585), humanistic writer and translator
- Auguste Peltz (1824–1900), founder of the Schneeberg Doll Factory
- Petrus Albinus (1543–1598), vice chancellor of the University of Wittenberg and Electorate of Saxony, historian
- Veit Hanns Schnorr von Carolsfeld, (1764–1841), portraitist
- Heinrich Stölzel (1777–1844), musician
- Egon Günther (1927–2017), German film director
- Enrico Kern (born 1979), German footballer with FC Hansa Rostock

== Partner towns ==
Schneeberg's partner towns are:

- (Germany) Herten in North Rhine-Westphalia
- (Hungary) Veresegyház in Pest County
- (Czech Republic) Jáchymov in Karlovy Vary Region
