= St. Wolfgang's Church, Schneeberg =

Coordinates: 50°35′38″N 12°38′39″E

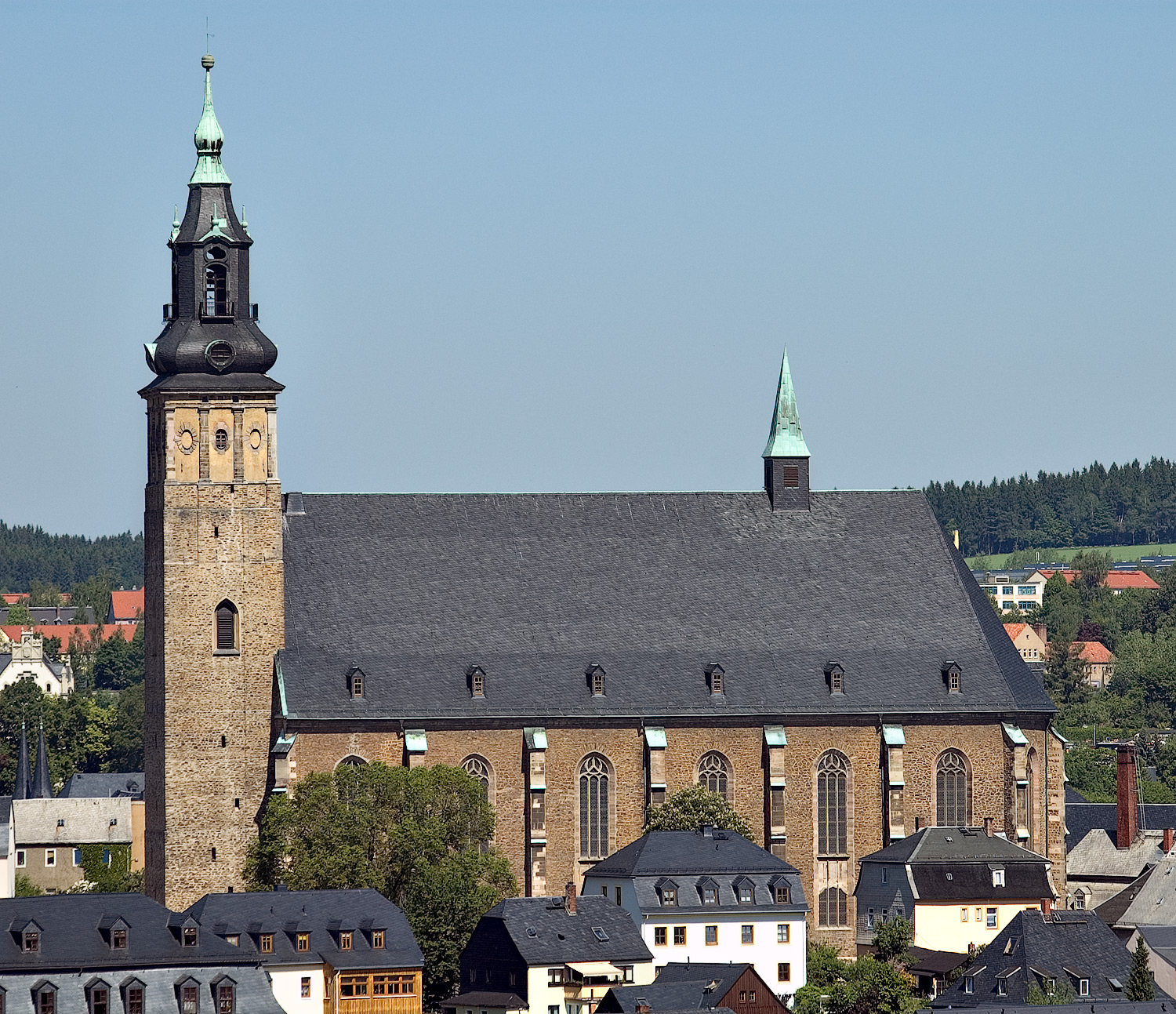
View of the church from Gleesberg

St. Wolfgang's Church (German: St.-Wolfgangs-Kirche) in Schneeberg is one of the largest hall churches of the Late Gothic in Saxon region of Germany. It was built in the early 16th century on parts of a small, earlier building and is an early example of a Reformation church building. Due to its dominant position on the summit of the Schneeberg hill, which in previous centuries had been riddled (durchörtet) with mining pits and galleries, it became known as the "Miners' Cathedral" (Bergmannsdom). The parish of St. Wolfgang in Schneeberg owns this summer church as well as the hospital church, the Church of the Trinity, Schneeberg on the Fürstenplatz as their winter church. In addition the parish of St. George & St. Martin, Griesbach, also belongs to the Lutheran-Evangelical parish of Schneeberg.

== See also ==
- Schneeberg Altarpiece

== Literature ==
- Jenny Lagaude: Der Cranach-Altar zu St. Wolfgang in Schneeberg. Ein Bildprogramm zwischen Spätmittelalter und Reformation. Leipzig; Berlin, 2010. ISBN 978-3-933816-43-6
- Enrico Langer (Ed). Das Schneeberger Orgel– und Clavierbuch um 1705. (Altenberg: Hans Jürgen Kamprad, 2020) ISBN 979-0-50258-262-3
- Uwe Gerig (ed.): Schneeberg, Ruth Gerig Verlag, 1994, ISBN 3-928275-38-0; Die Kirche "St. Wolfgang", pages 26–31
