= Gotha Altarpiece =

16th-century Lutheran altarpiece

Der Gothaer Tafelaltar
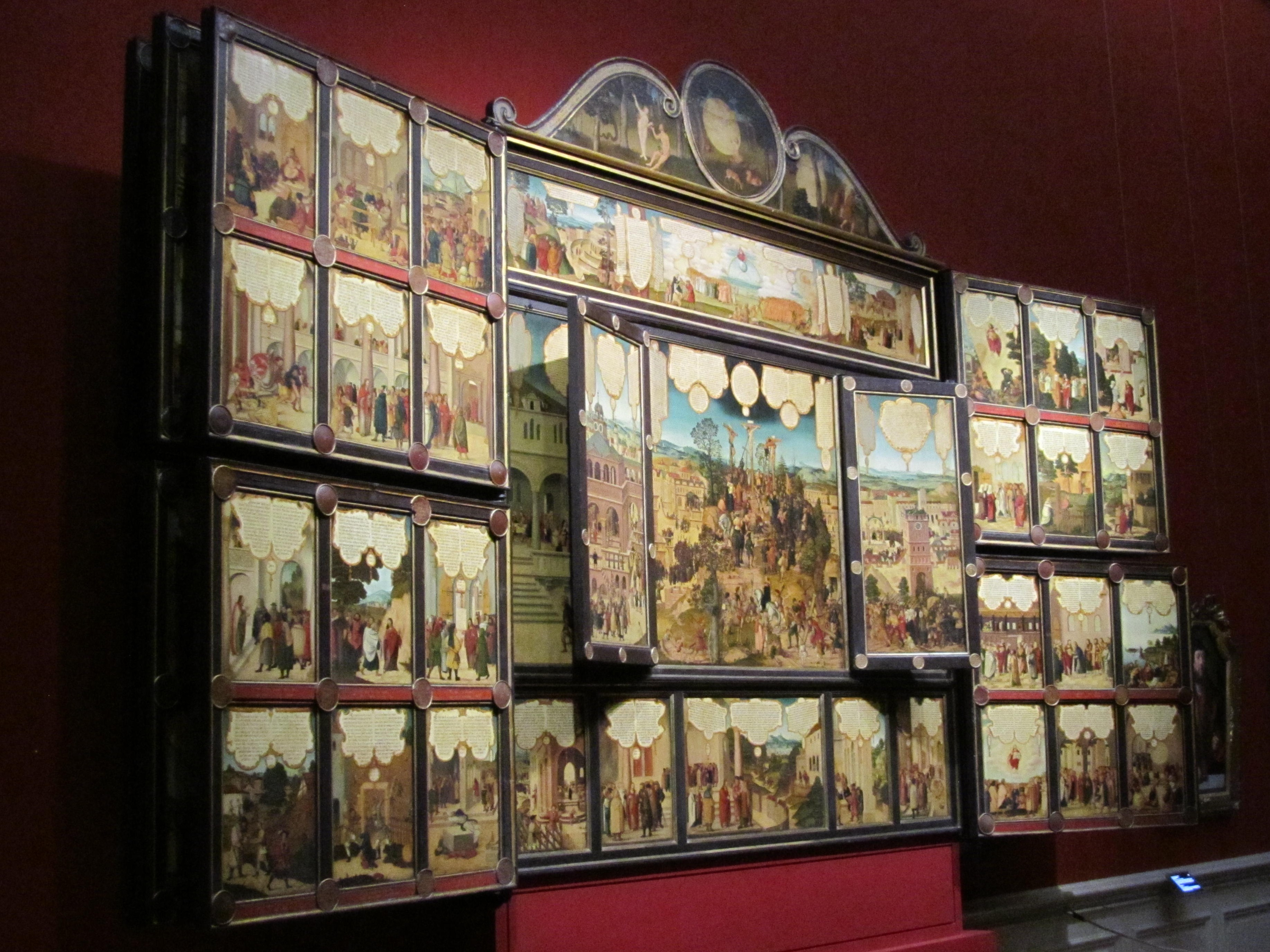
- Artist: Heinrich Füllmaurer
- Year: 1538
- Medium: Mixed media on fir panel
- Movement: German Renaissance
- Dimensions: 418 cm × 252 cm (165 in × 99 in)
- Location: Ducal Museum, Gotha
- Owner: Stiftung Schloss Friedenstein, Gotha

The Gotha Altarpiece (or Gotha Table-Altar) is a Lutheran winged altarpiece created between 1538 and 1541 in the Renaissance style by German artist Heinrich Füllmaurer who was religiously advised by the Lutheran theologian Kaspar Gräter. It is considered one of the most important artworks of the Reformation period.

== History and description ==
The Gotha Altarpiece consists of 162 individual panels on 14 folded wings, which makes it the most extensive panel work of German panel painting art. The polyptych consists of a central section, two fixed wings and fourteen movable wings, which allow a total of five display sides depicting scenes from the life of Jesus Christ along with three scenes from the story of the 'Creation', described in words and illustrations in 157 paintings, which contain around 290 individual scenes. Above each individual scene, there is a cartouche containing rhyming verses on the frame strips, with the corresponding excerpts based on the Luther Bible and Lutheran Gospel harmony by Jacob Beringer published in 1526. The Gotha Altarpiece is therefore a comprehensive representation of Protestant theology and christology, based on the Lutheran teachings and beliefs. The winged altar has been located in Friedenstein Palace in Gotha since the middle of the 17th century. After the World War II, the altarpiece was taken to the Soviet Union to be brought back to Gotha in 1957, although the fixed wing is still in the Pushkin Museum in Moscow.
