= Auguste Peltz =

German businessperson

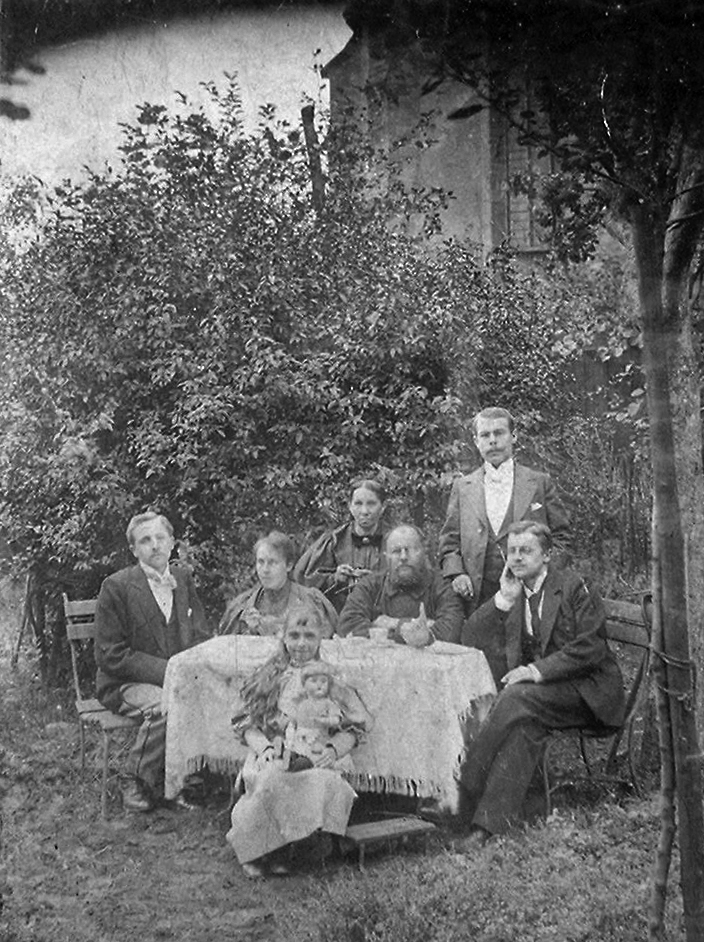
Family Peltz

Auguste Peltz (1824–1900) was a German businessperson. She founded and managed the famous Schneeberg Doll Factory in 1849-1876.
