= Winged altarpiece =

Form of folding altarpiece

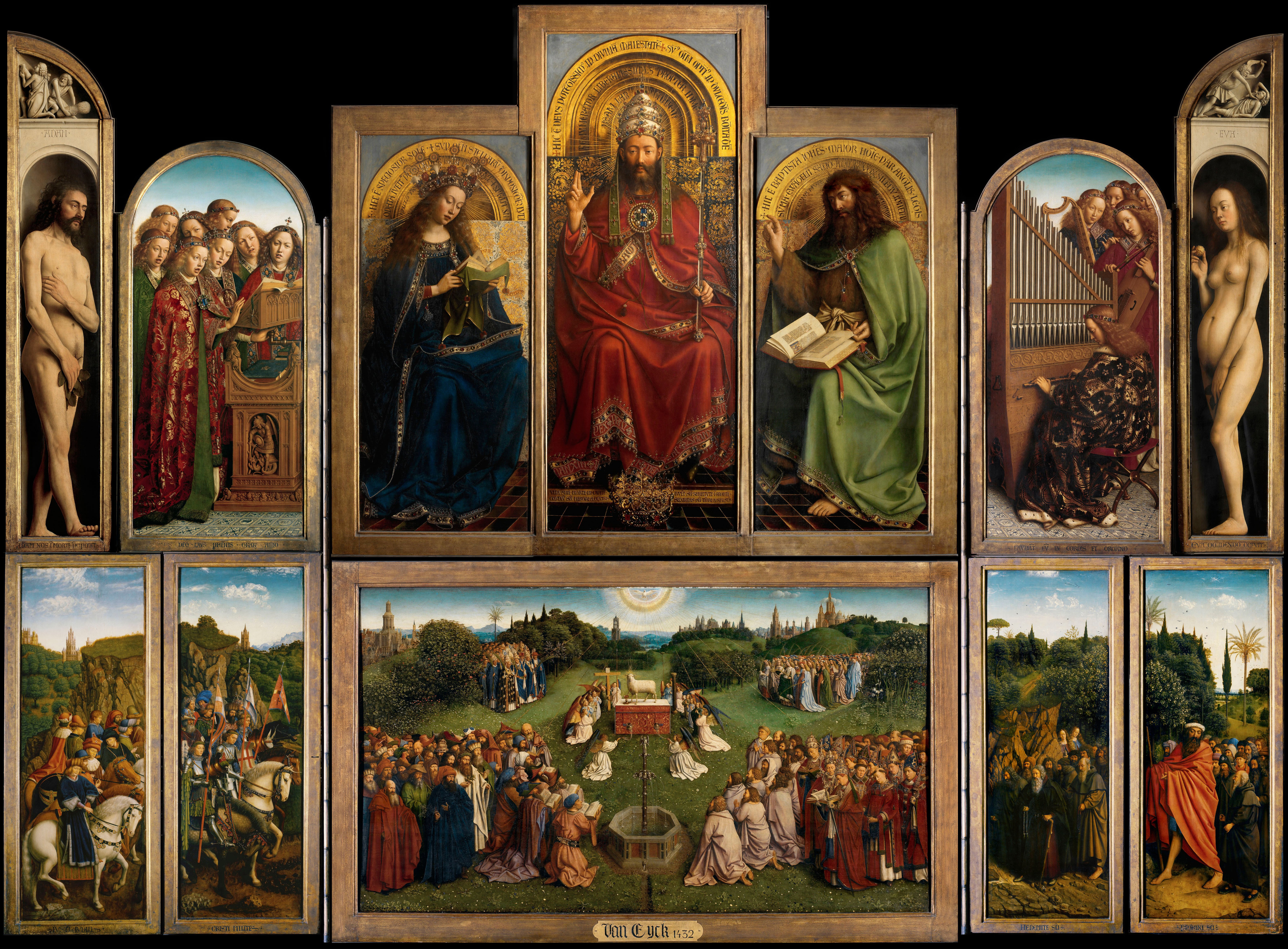
The twelve interior panels of the Ghent Altarpiece. This open view measures 11 ft × 15 ft (3.4 m × 4.6 m)

Closed view of the Ghent Altarpiece

A winged altarpiece (also folding altar or winged retable) is a special form of altarpiece (reredos, occasionally retable), common in Northern and Central Europe, in which the central image, either a painting or relief sculpture (or some combination of the two) can be hidden by hinged wings. It is called a triptych if there are two wings, a pentaptych (but this is rarely used in English) if there are four, or a polyptych if there are four or more. The technical terms are derived from Ancient Greek: τρίς: trís or "triple"; πέντε: pénte or "five"; πολύς: polýs or "many"; and πτυχή: ptychē or "fold, layer".

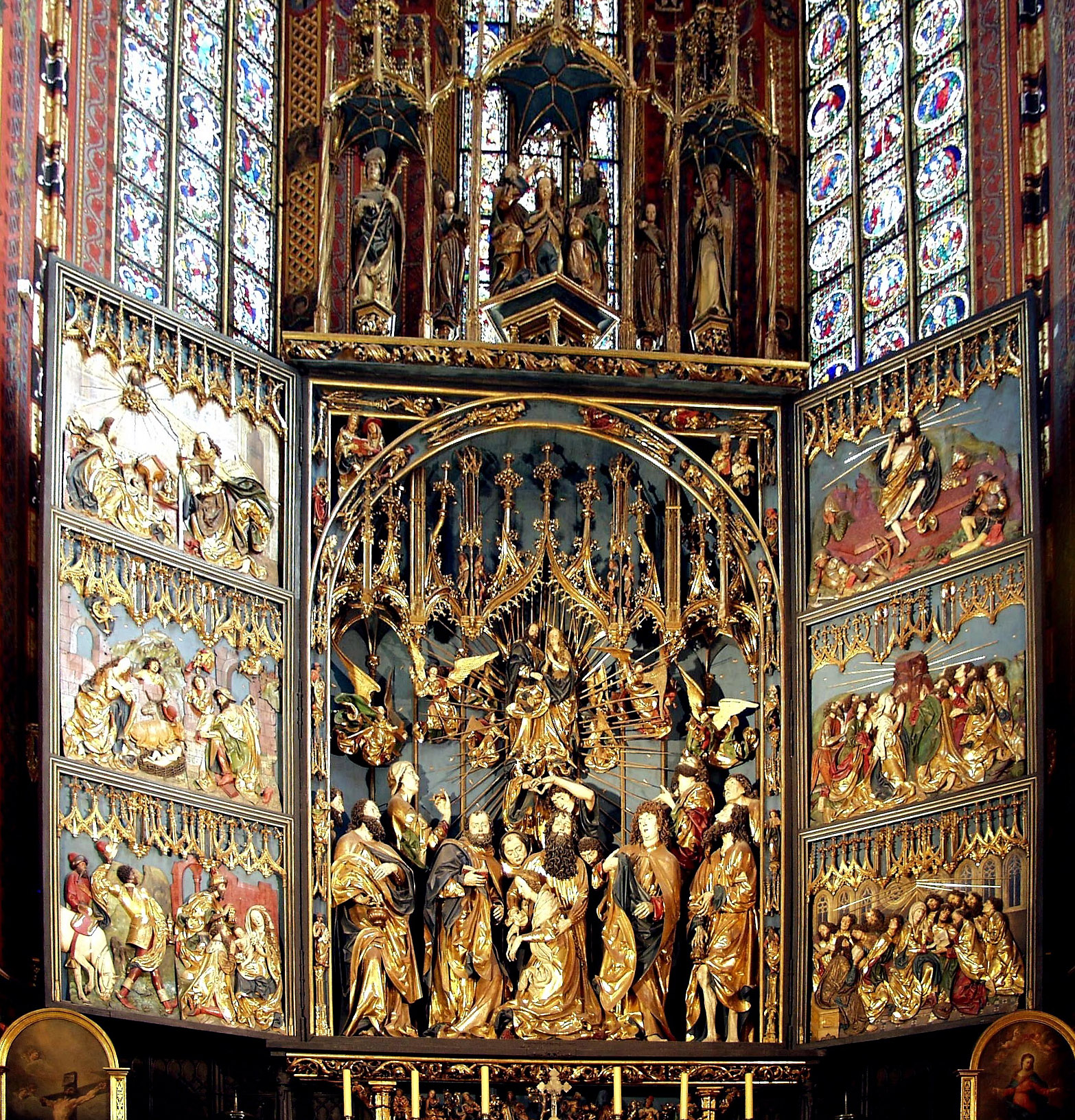
Krakow High Altar by Veit Stoß: wings with reliefs and altar shrine with wood carvings

There are often images on both the insides and outsides of the wings, enabling the altarpiece to display completely different views when open and closed. It was usually the custom to keep the wings closed except on Sundays or feast days, although very often the sacristan would open them for tourists at any time for a modest tip. Small winged paintings, usually triptychs, were also owned by the wealthy for private devotions, and services in the house; they had the advantage that the open view was fairly well protected when covered up during travel.

The form was especially popular in the later Middle Ages, and during the Northern Renaissance. In the 17th century, Rubens was one of the last major painters to use it. It was never as popular in Italy, where there were many polyptychs, but usually built without hinges, so always "open", even if there were also images on the back, as in the Maestà by Duccio for Siena Cathedral.

Above the retable may be found the crowning or superstructure, pinnacles and flowers of the cross. Relics can be housed below it, in a reliquary in the predella lying on the altar stone.

== Examples ==
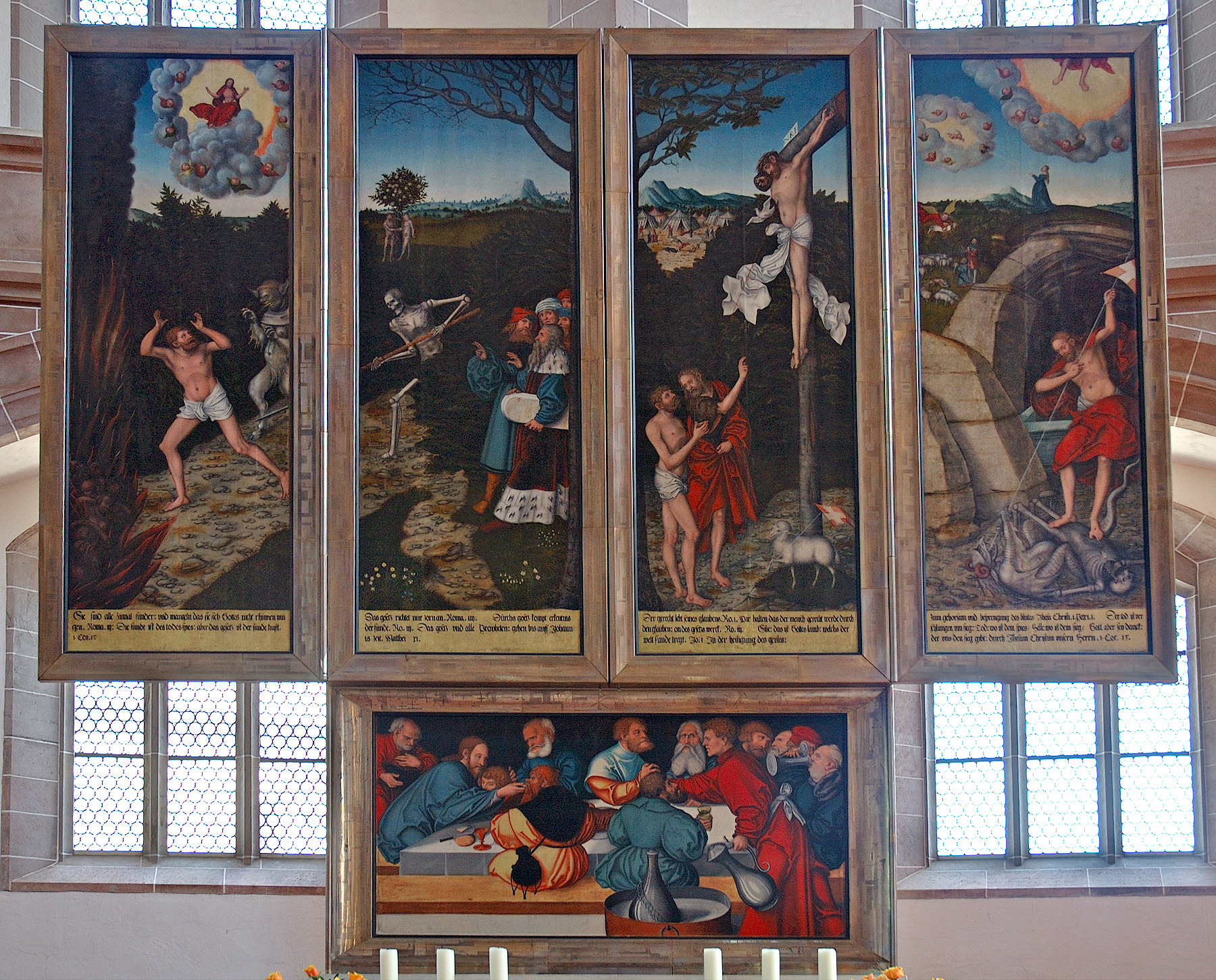
Winged altar of St. Wolfgang's Church in Schneeberg: painted panels

- Pacher Altar of St. Wolfgang im Salzkammergut
- Kefermarkt Altarpiece in Kefermarkt
- Krakow High Altar in St. Mary's Basilica by Veit Stoß.
- Ghent Altarpiece by Jan van Eyck
- Isenheim Altarpiece by Matthias Grünewald
- Herrenberg Altarpiece, Staatsgalerie Stuttgart
- Antwerp Retable
- The largest collection of medieval reredoses in Germany is to be found in St. Anne's Abbey, Lübeck, including the Passion Altarpiece by Hans Memling and the Schonen Altarpiece by Bernt Notke

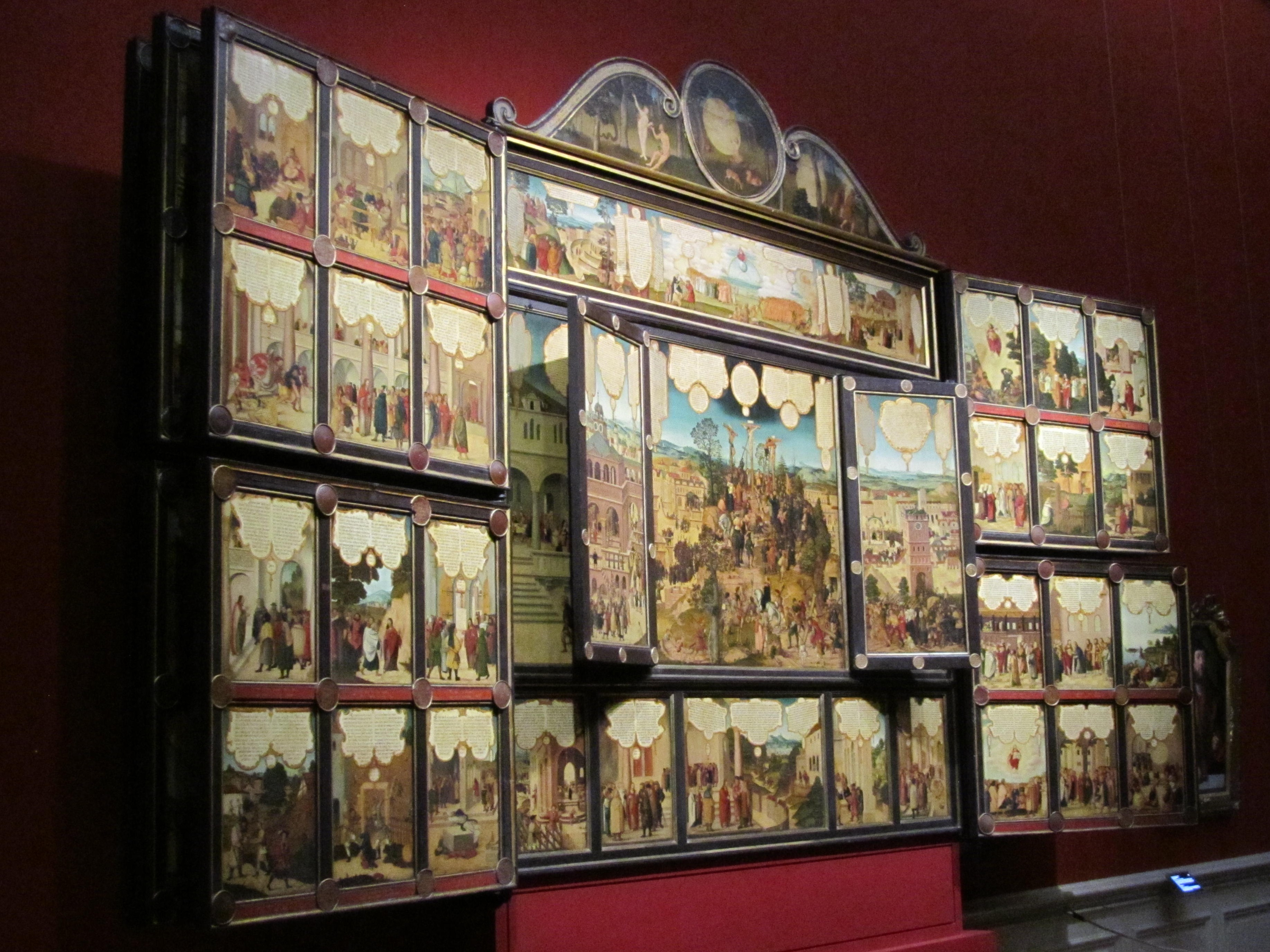
1540 Gotha Altarpiece with 157 individual scenes, displayed in the Ducal Museum in Gotha

- The Last Judgment by Hans Memling, Gdańsk
- Schwabach Altarpiece in the Church of St. John and St. Martin in Schwabach, a high altar from the workshop of Michael Wolgemut
- The Altar Wings of Roudníky
- Altar of Saint Mary, Alpirsbach Abbey

== Literature ==
- Herbert Schindler: The Schnitzaltar. Meisterwerke und Meister in Süddeutschland, Österreich und Südtirol. Verlag Friedrich Pustet, Regensburg 1978. ISBN 3-7917-0754-X
- Karl-Werner Bachmann, Géza Jászai, Friedrich Kobler, Catheline Périer-D'Ieteren, Barbara Rommé, Norbert Wolf: Flügelretabel, in: Reallexikon zur Deutschen Kunstgeschichte, Vol. 9, 2003, ISBN 3-406-14009-2, cols. 1450–1536.

== See also ==
- Triptych
- Polyptych
