= Wolfgang of Regensburg =

German saint

Saint Wolfgang
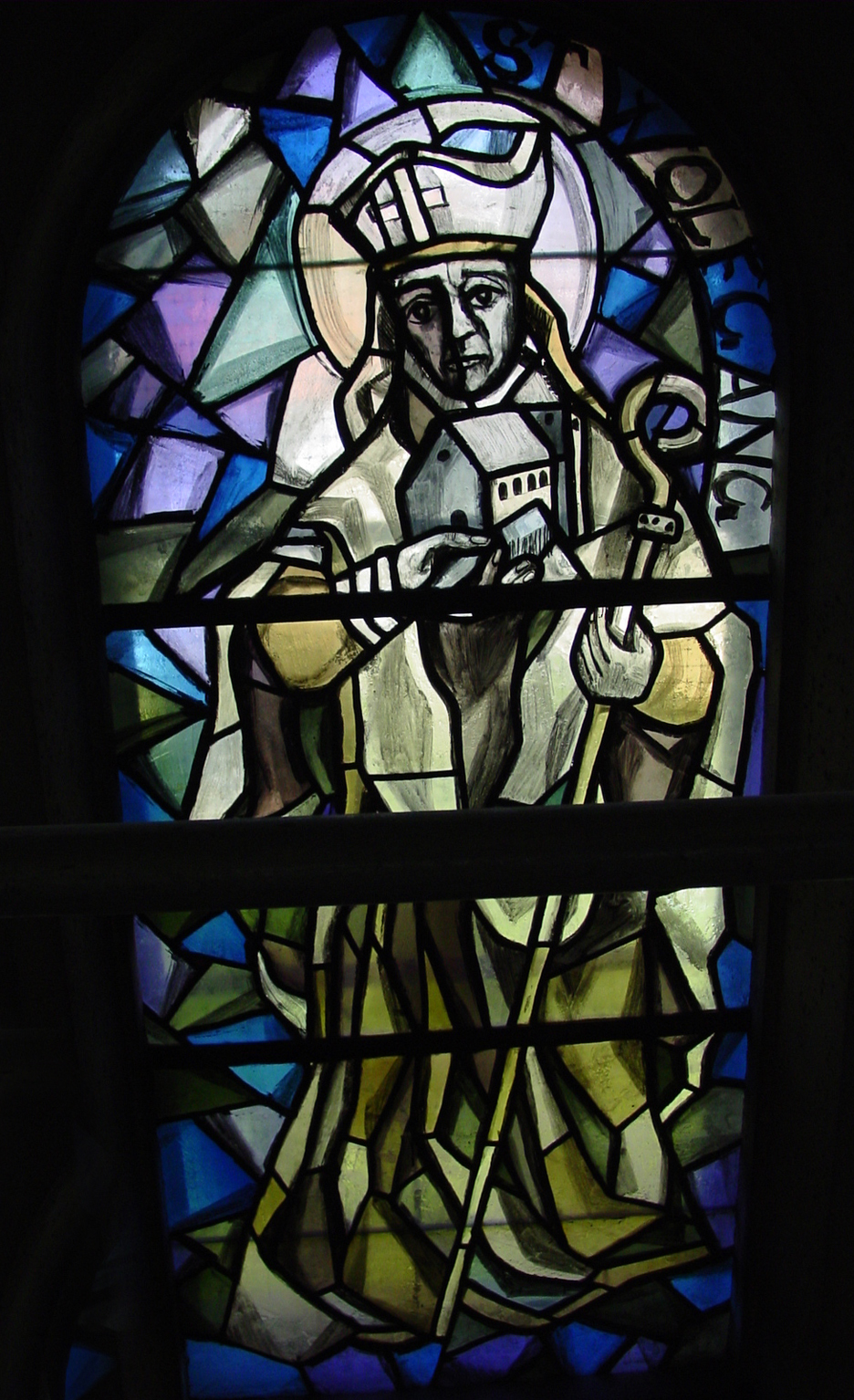
- Saint Wolfgang, stained glass, Parish Church in Leising

The Almoner
- Born: c. 934; Holy Roman Empire
- Died: 31 October 994
- Venerated in: Catholic Church; Eastern Orthodox Church
- Canonized: 1052 AD by Pope Leo IX
- Feast: 31 October
- Attributes: depicted with an axe in the right hand and the crozier in the left; or as a hermit in the wilderness being discovered by a hunter.
- Patronage: apoplexy; carpenters and wood carvers; paralysis; Regensburg, Germany; stomach diseases; strokes

Wolfgang of Regensburg (Latin: Wolfgangus; c. 934 – 31 October 994 AD) was bishop of Regensburg in Bavaria from Christmas 972 until his death. He is a saint in the Catholic and Eastern Orthodox churches. He is regarded as one of the three great German saints of the 10th century, the other two being Ulrich of Augsburg and Conrad of Constance. Towards the end of his life Wolfgang withdrew as a hermit to a solitary spot, in the Salzkammergut region of Upper Austria. Soon after Wolfgang's death many churches chose him as their patron saint, and various towns were named after him.

== Early life ==
Wolfgang was descended from the family of the Swabian Counts of Pfullingen. When seven years old, he had an ecclesiastic as a tutor at home; later he attended the celebrated monastic school at Reichenau Abbey. Here he formed a strong friendship with Henry of Babenberg, brother of Bishop Poppo of Würzburg, whom he followed to Würzburg in order to attend the lectures of the noted Italian grammarian Stephen of Novara at the cathedral school.

After Henry was made Archbishop of Trier in 956, he summoned Wolfgang, who became a teacher in the cathedral school of Trier, and also labored for the reform of the archdiocese, despite the hostility with which his efforts were met. Wolfgang's residence at Trier greatly influenced his monastic and ascetic tendencies, as here he came into contact with the great reform monastery of the 10th century, St. Maximin's Abbey, Trier, where he made the acquaintance of Ramuold, the teacher of Saint Adalbert of Prague.

After the death of Archbishop Henry of Trier in 964, Wolfgang entered the Benedictine order in the Abbey of Maria Einsiedeln, Switzerland, and was ordained priest by Saint Ulrich in 968.

== Mission to the Magyars ==
After their defeat in the Battle of the Lechfeld (955), Hungarians settled in ancient Pannonia, where they remained a constant menace to the empire. At the request of Ulrich, who clearly saw the danger, and at the desire of the Emperor Otto the Great, Wolfgang, according to the abbey annals, was "sent to the Hungarians" as the most suitable man to evangelize them.

He was followed by other missionaries sent by Piligrim, Bishop of Passau, under whose jurisdiction the new missionary region came.

== Bishop of Regensburg ==
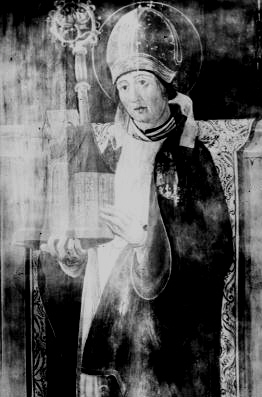
Saint Wolfgang altar painting, made c. 1490

After the death of Bishop Michael of Regensburg (23 September 972) Bishop Piligrim obtained from the emperor the appointment of Wolfgang as the new bishop (Christmas 972). Wolfgang's services in this new position were of the highest importance. As Bishop of Regensburg, Wolfgang became the tutor of Emperor Saint Henry II, who learned from him the principles which governed his life. Poppe, son of Margrave Luitpold, Archbishop of Trier (1018), and Tagino, Archbishop of Magdeburg (1004–1012), also had him as their teacher.

Wolfgang deserves credit for his disciplinary labours in his diocese. His main work in this respect was connected with the ancient and celebrated St. Emmeram's Abbey, which he reformed by granting it once more abbots of its own, thus withdrawing it from the control of the bishops of Regensburg, who for many years had been abbots in commendam, a condition of affairs that had been far from beneficial to the abbey and monastic life. He was one of the first German bishops to do this, and his example in this was much copied across Germany in the years following. In the Benedictine monk Ramuold, whom Wolfgang called from Saint Maximin at Trier, Saint Emmeram received a capable abbot (975).

Wolfgang was an advocate of the monastic reforms of Gorze Abbey which aimed at a reestablishing adherence to the Rule of St. Benedict. He also reformed the convents of Obermünster and Niedermünster at Regensburg, chiefly by giving them as an example the convent of St. Paul, Mittelmünster, at Regensburg, which he had founded in 983. He also cooperated in the reform of the ancient and celebrated Benedictine Abbey of Niederaltaich, which had been founded by the Agilolfinger dynasty, and which from that time took on new life.

He showed genuine episcopal generosity in the liberal manner with which he met the views of the Emperor Otto II regarding the intended reduction in size of his diocese for the benefit of the new Diocese of Prague (973), to which Dětmar was appointed first bishop. As prince of the empire he performed his duties towards the emperor and the empire with the utmost scrupulousness and, like Ulrich, was one of the mainstays of the Ottonian policies.

He took part in the various imperial Diets, and, in the autumn of 978, accompanied the Emperor Otto II on his campaign to Paris, and took part in the Diet of Verona in June 983. He was succeeded by Gebhard I.

== Hermitage and death ==
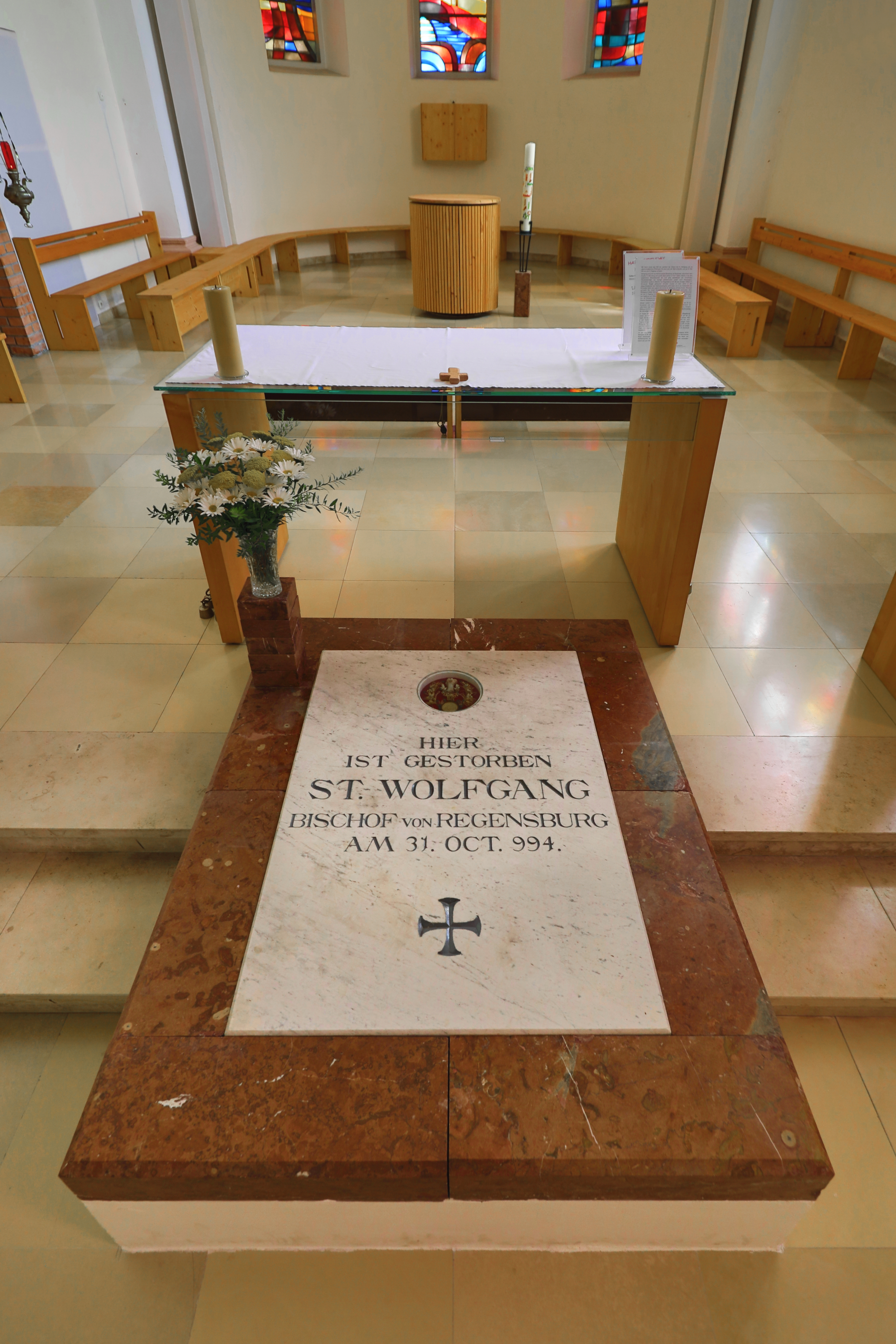
Memorial stone regarding the place of death of St. Wolfgang

Apparently on account of a political dispute between Duke Henry II of Bavaria and Emperor Otto II, Wolfgang spent a year at Mondsee in 976. From there he withdrew as a hermit to a solitary spot, now the Wolfgangsee ("Wolfgang's Lake") in the Salzkammergut region of Upper Austria. He was discovered by a hunter and brought back to Regensburg.

While travelling on the Danube to Pöchlarn in Lower Austria, he fell ill at the village of Pupping, which is between Eferding and the market town of Aschach near Linz, and at his request was carried into the chapel of Saint Othmar at Pupping, where he died.

His body was taken up the Danube by his friends Count Aribo of Andechs and Archbishop Hartwich of Salzburg to Regensburg, and was solemnly buried in the crypt of Saint Emmeram. Many miracles were reported at his grave; in 1052 he was canonized.

== Veneration ==
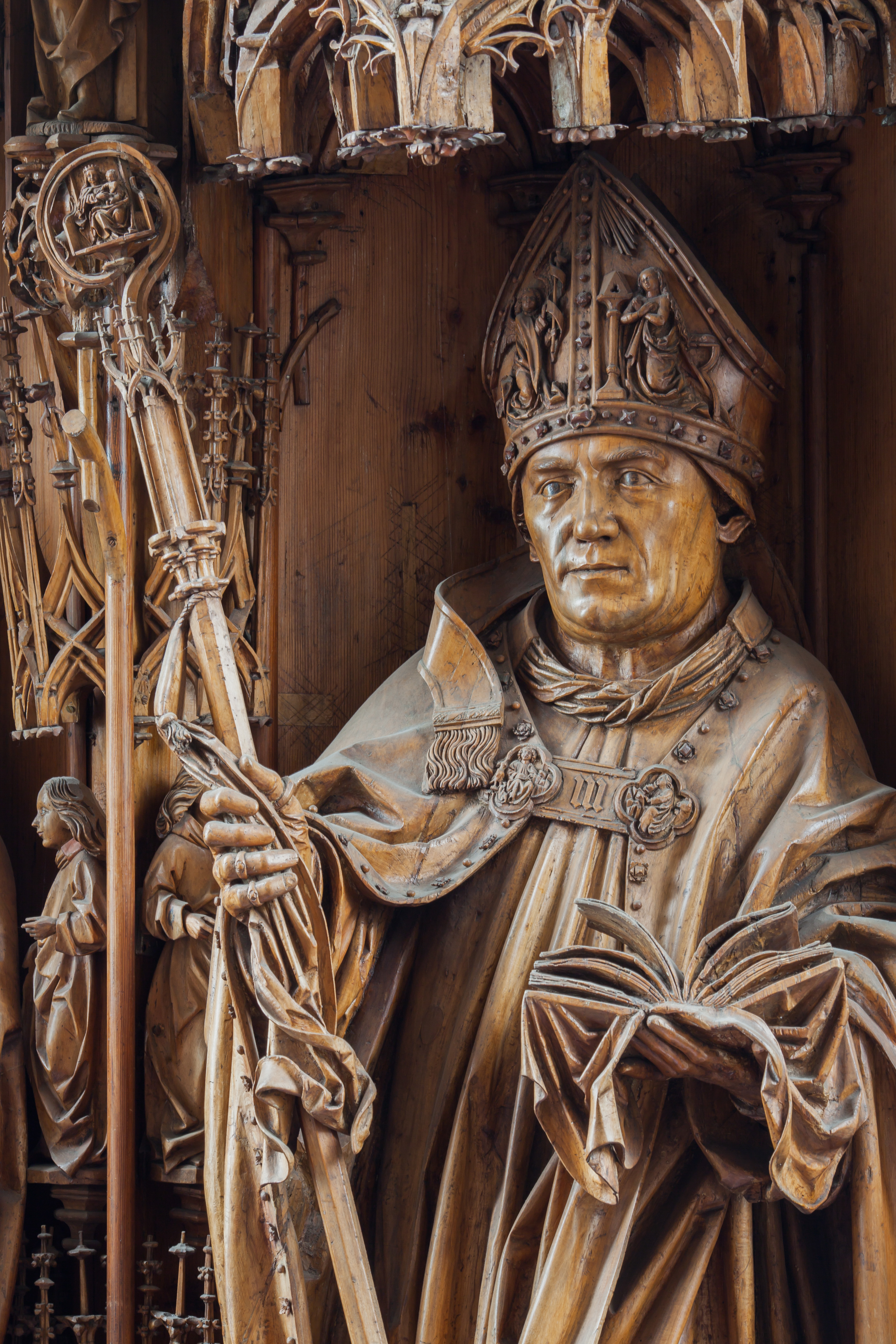
Saint Wolfgang as depicted in the Kefermarkt altarpiece

Soon after Wolfgang's death many churches chose him as their patron saint, and various towns were named after him.

Wolfgang is sometimes counted among the Fourteen Holy Helpers. He is the patron saint of woodcutters.

In Christian art he has been especially honoured by the medieval Tyrolean painter Michael Pacher (1430–1498), who created an imperishable memorial to him, the high altar of St. Wolfgang. In the panel pictures which are now exhibited in the Old Pinakothek at Munich are depicted in an artistic manner the chief events in the saint's life. The Kefermarkt altarpiece in Kefermarkt in Upper Austria is another monumental Late Gothic piece of art dedicated to the saint.

The oldest portrait of Wolfgang is a miniature, painted about the year 1100 in the Evangeliary of Saint Emmeram, now in the library of the castle cathedral at Kraków.

A modern picture by Schwind is in the Schack Gallery at Munich. This painting represents the legend of Wolfgang forcing the devil to help him to build a church.

In other paintings he is generally depicted in episcopal dress, an axe in the right hand and the crozier in the left, or as a hermit in the wilderness being discovered by a hunter.

The axe refers to an incident in the life of the saint. After having selected a solitary spot in the wilderness, he prayed and then threw his axe into the thicket; the spot on which the axe fell he regarded as the place where God intended he should build his cell. This axe is still shown in the little market town of St. Wolfgang which sprang up on the spot of the old cell.

== Literature ==
At the request of the Abbey of St. Emmeram, the life of Wolfgang was written by Otloh, a Benedictine monk of St. Emmeram about 1050. This life is especially important for the early medieval history both of the church and of civilization in Bavaria and Austria, and it forms the basis of all later accounts of the saint.

The oldest and best manuscript of this Vita is in the library of Einsiedeln Abbey in Switzerland (MS. No. 322), and has been printed with critical notes in Mon. Germ. His.: Script., IV, 524–542.

== See also ==
- Saint Wolfgang of Regensburg, patron saint archive
