= Gebhard I =

Gebhard I may refer to:

- Gebhard I (Bishop of Regensburg) (died 1023)
- Gebhard I von Mansfeld-Vorderort (ca. 1525/30–1562)
