= Prüll Charterhouse =

Monastery in Regensburg, Germany

Coordinates: 49°00′03″N 12°05′18″E

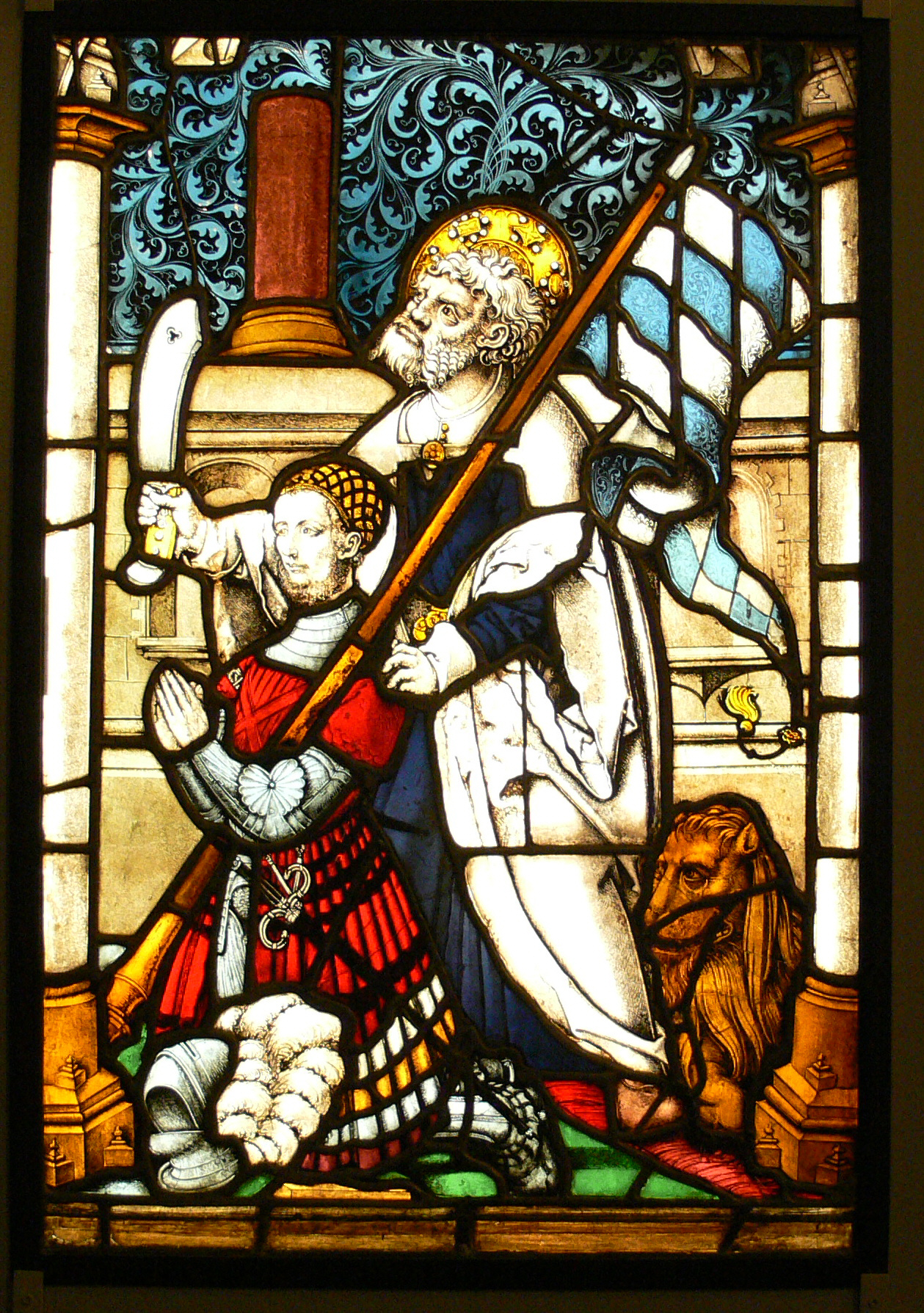
William IV of Bavaria, and Saint Bartholomew: stained glass window from the choir of the church of Prüll Charterhouse, now in the Bayerisches Nationalmuseum, Munich

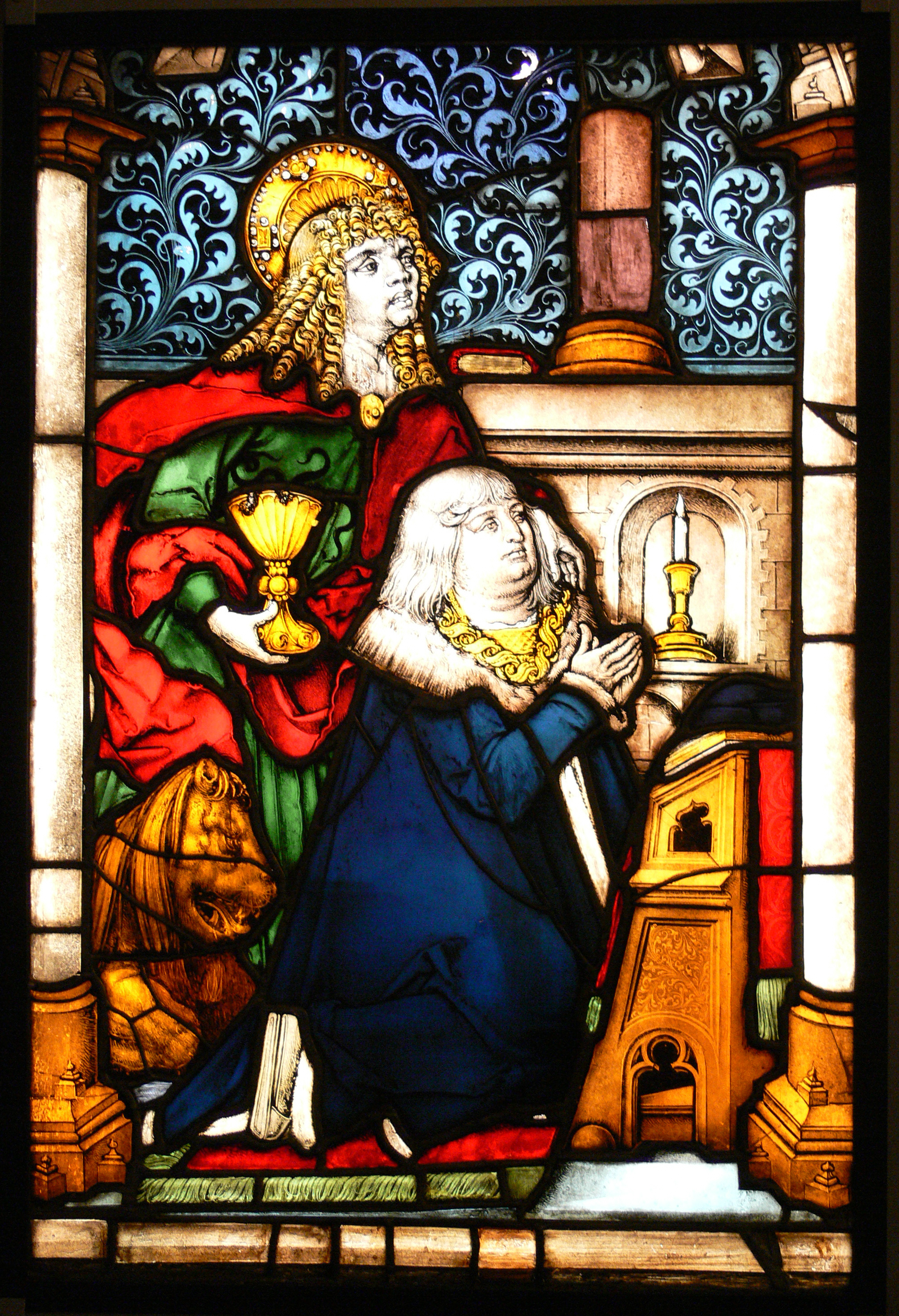
Albert IV of Bavaria, and Saint John the Evangelist: stained glass window from the choir of the church of Prüll Charterhouse, now in the Bayerisches Nationalmuseum, Munich

Prüll Charterhouse, previously Prüll Abbey (Kartause or Kloster Prüll), is a former Carthusian monastery, or charterhouse, in Regensburg in Bavaria, Germany.

== History ==
The monastery, dedicated to Saint Vitus, was established as Prüll Abbey, a Benedictine foundation, in 997 by Gebhard I, Bishop of Regensburg, and his brother Rapoto. In about 1100 the Ottonian church building was replaced by a Romanesque hall church, the first of the sort in Bavaria.

In 1484 Prüll became a Carthusian monastery, with the support of Albert IV, Duke of Bavaria, and later his son William IV. Substantial additions were made to the buildings to adapt them for Carthusian use. In the church additional choirs were built, stained glass from which is now in the Bayerisches Nationalmuseum in Munich.

It was dissolved in 1803 in the secularisation of Bavaria.

The monastery church fell into decay. Half of the monks' cells, the chapter room, the refectory and the library were demolished. What remained of the premises was acquired in 1835 by the Bavarian state. In 1852 a lunatic asylum was accommodated here. Today the buildings are the home of the Regensburg District Clinic (Bezirksklinikum Regensburg).

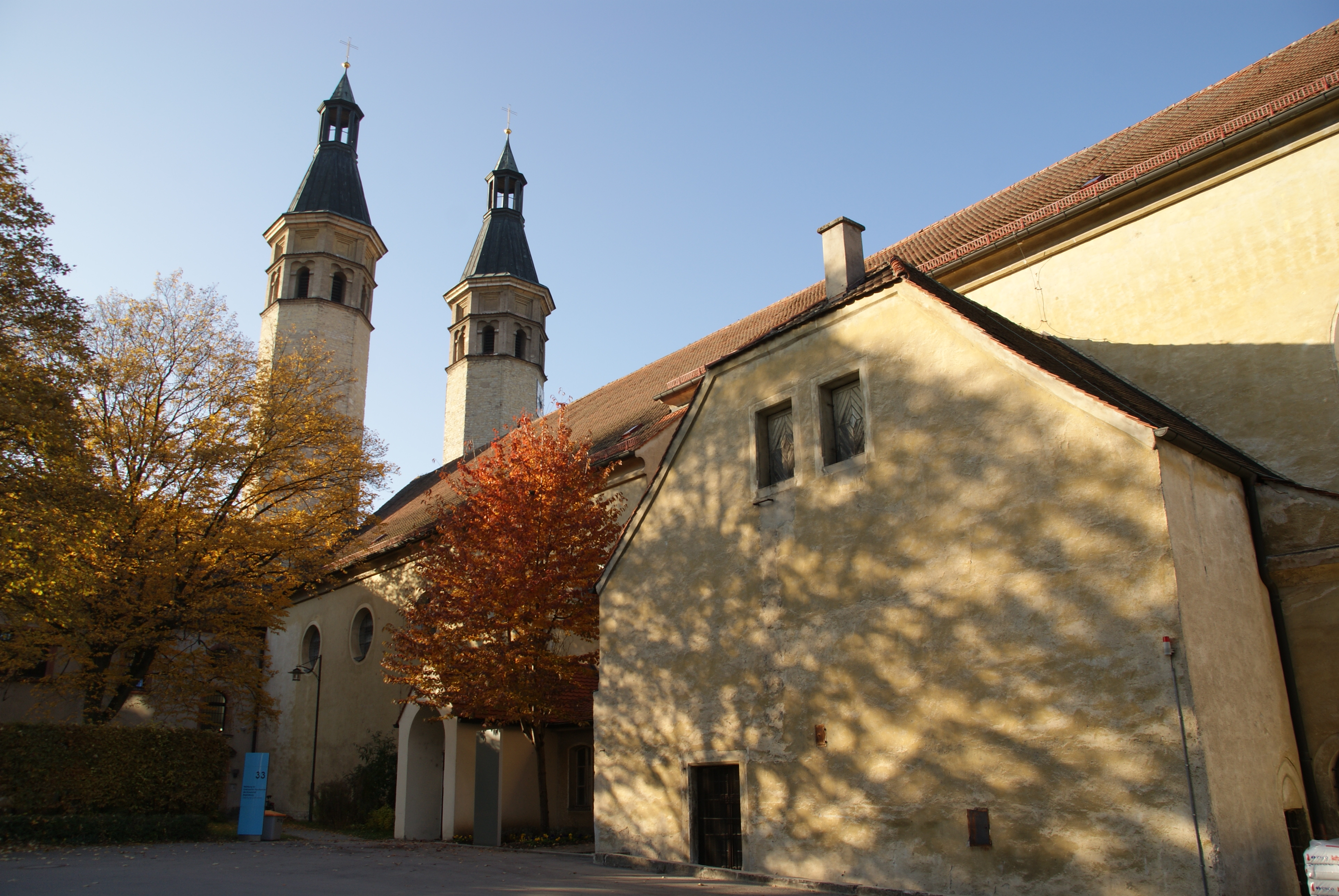
Former monastic church of St. Vitus and gatehouse

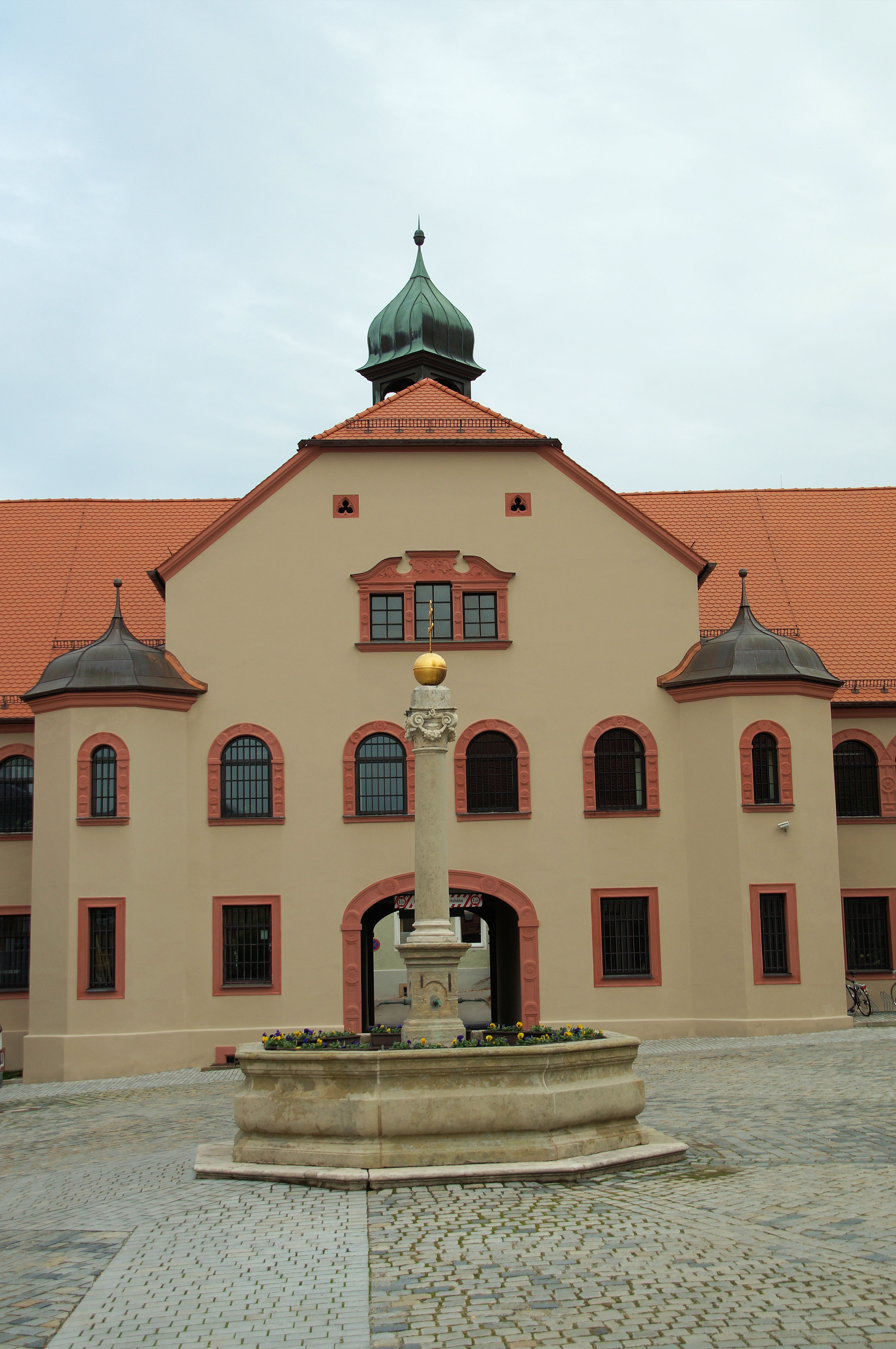
Courtyard

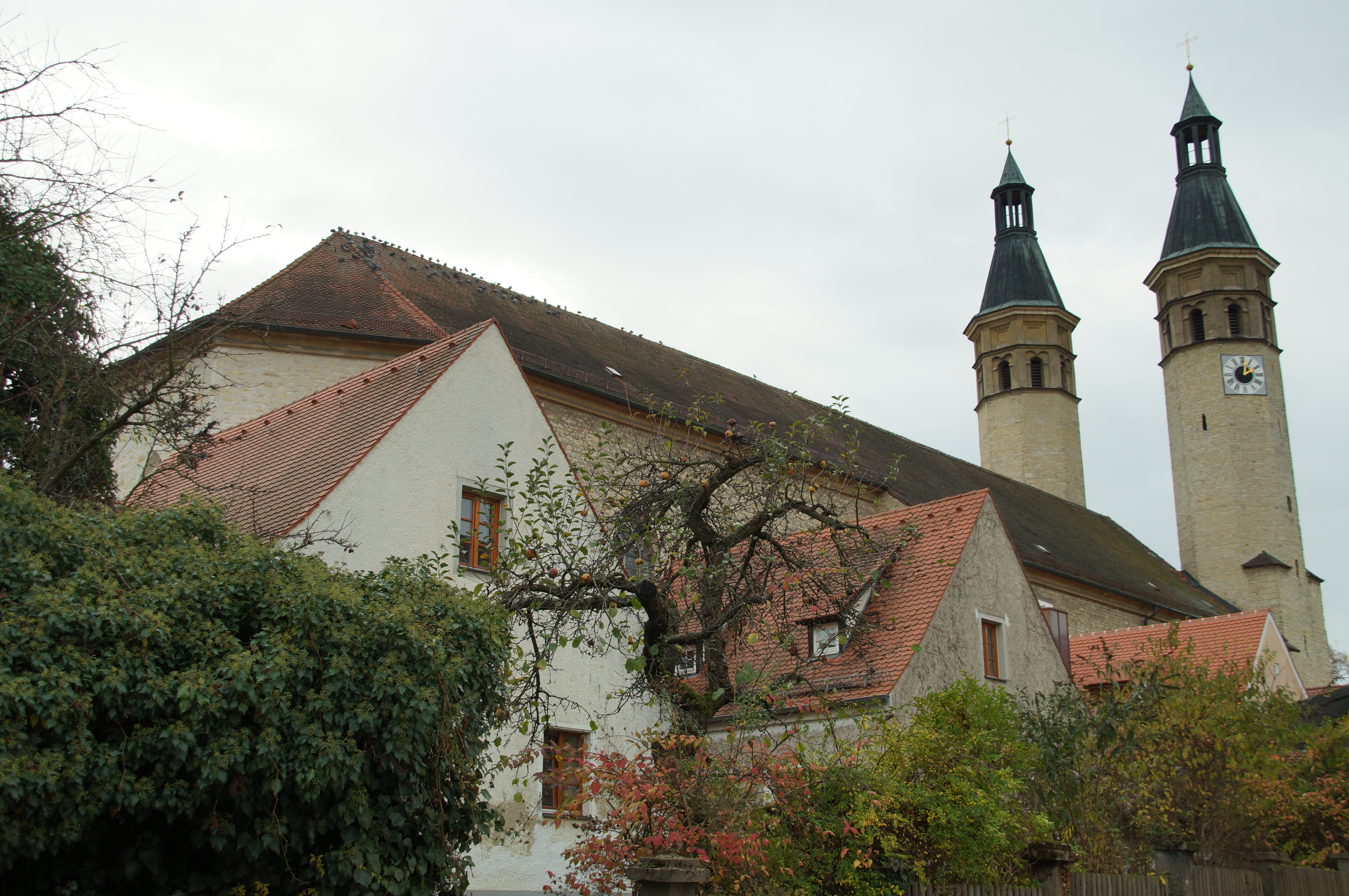
Former monastic church of St. Vitus with monks' cells attached

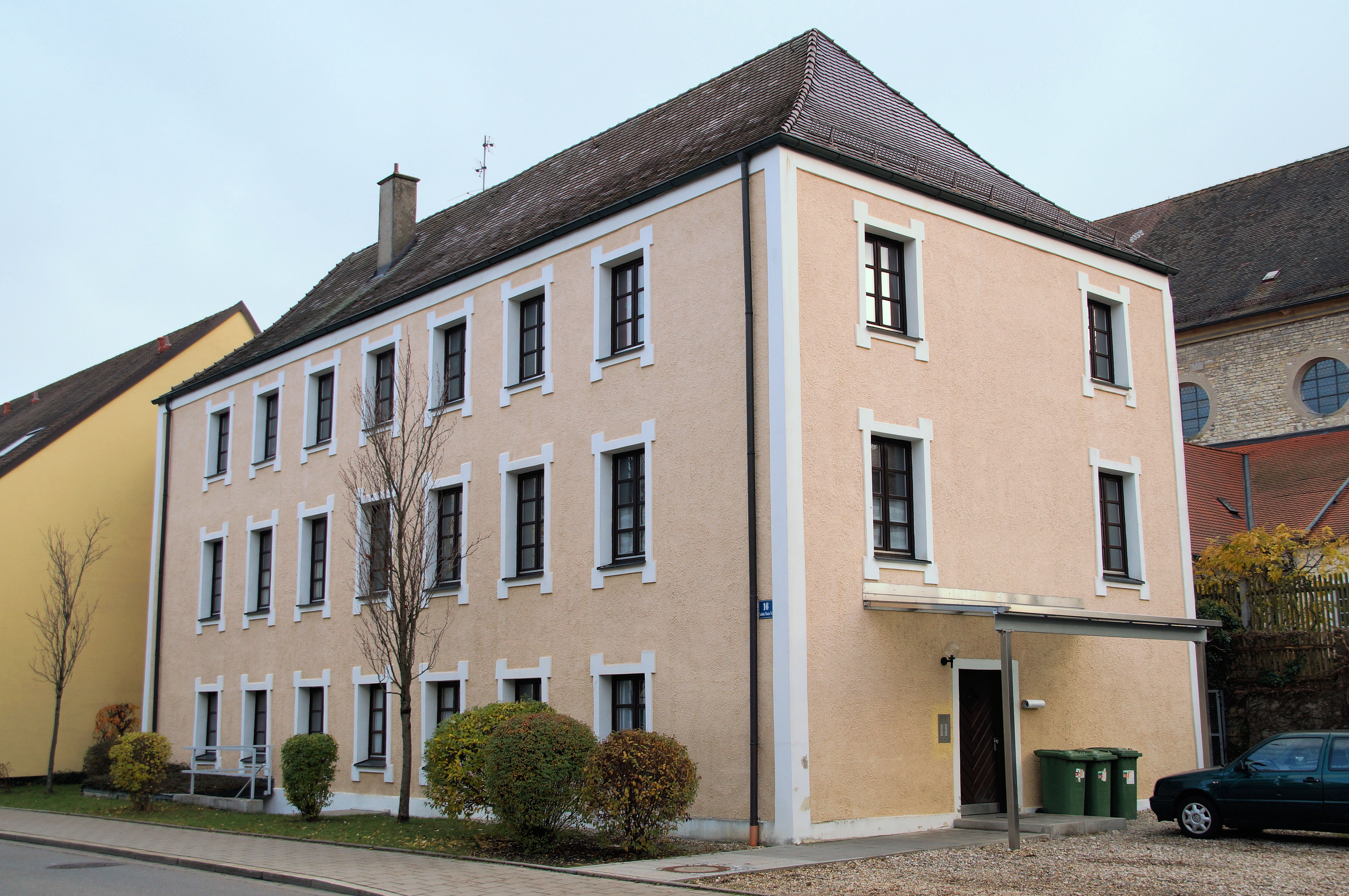
Former parish church of St. Vitus

== Sources/ External links ==
- Klöster in Bayern: Prüll bei Regensburg - die einzige Kartause in Altbayern (in German)
