= Gebhard I (bishop of Regensburg) =

Gebhard I (died 27 March 1023), known as Gebhard of Swabia, was the Bishop of Regensburg from 994 until his death.

Gebhard was the son of Rapoto III, Count of the Inn and Nori Valley.

Following the death of Bishop Wolfgang, the cathedral canons elected Tagino to replace him, with the support of Henry II, Duke of Bavaria. Otto III, however, ignored the election and appointed his own royal chaplain, Gebhard, instead; he then took Tagino into his royal chapel.

During his episcopate, he founded Prüll Abbey and tried to revert the separation between the property of the diocese and that of St. Emmeram's Abbey, which his predecessor had effected. This gave rise to much dispute. In 996, Otto heard Abbot Ramwold's complaint and summoned Gebhard, whom he made promise not to confiscate further property from St. Emmeram's. He put the monastery under royal protection. He nevertheless remained in conflict over financial matters into the reign of the Emperor Henry II.

Gebhard also gained the right of coinage from Otto III.

On his death, he was succeeded by Gebhard II.

== Sources ==
- Bernhardt, John W, 1993: Itinerant Kingship and Royal Monasteries in Early Medieval Germany, c. 936–1075. Cambridge: Cambridge University Press
