= Kefermarkt =

- Municipality
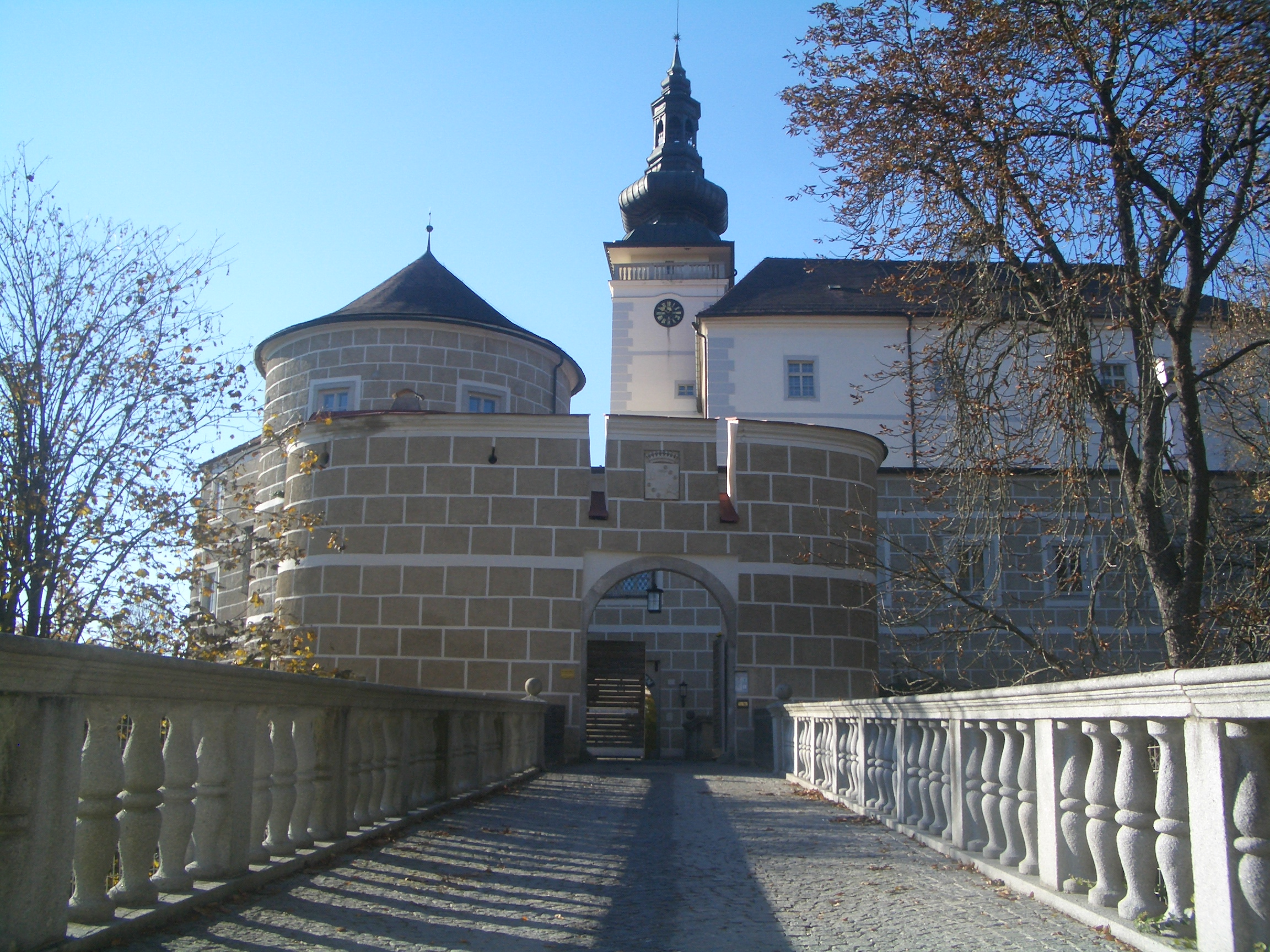

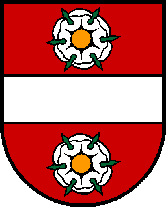
- Coat of arms

- Location within Austria
- Coordinates: 48°26′34″N 14°32′15″E
- Country: Austria
- State: Upper Austria
- District: Freistadt

Government
  - Mayor: Herbert Brandstötter (ÖVP)

Area
  - Total: 27.83 km^{2} (10.75 sq mi)
- Elevation: 516 m (1,693 ft)

Population (2018-01-01)
  - Total: 2,116
  - Density: 76.03/km^{2} (196.9/sq mi)
- Time zone: UTC+1 (CET)
  - Summer (DST): UTC+2 (CEST)
- Postal code: 4292
- Area code: 07947
- Vehicle registration: FR
- Website: www.kefermarkt.ooe.gv.at

Kefermarkt is a municipality in the district of Freistadt in the Austrian state of Upper Austria. The church in Kefermarkt houses the late medieval Kefermarkt Altarpiece.

== Population ==
Historical population
| Year | Pop. | ±% |
|---|---|---|
| 1869 | 1,441 | — |
| 1880 | 1,527 | +6.0% |
| 1890 | 1,481 | −3.0% |
| 1900 | 1,506 | +1.7% |
| 1910 | 1,604 | +6.5% |
| 1923 | 1,659 | +3.4% |
| 1934 | 1,642 | −1.0% |
| 1939 | 1,614 | −1.7% |
| 1951 | 1,697 | +5.1% |
| 1961 | 1,721 | +1.4% |
| 1971 | 1,798 | +4.5% |
| 1981 | 1,738 | −3.3% |
| 1991 | 1,950 | +12.2% |
| 2001 | 2,056 | +5.4% |

== Gallery ==
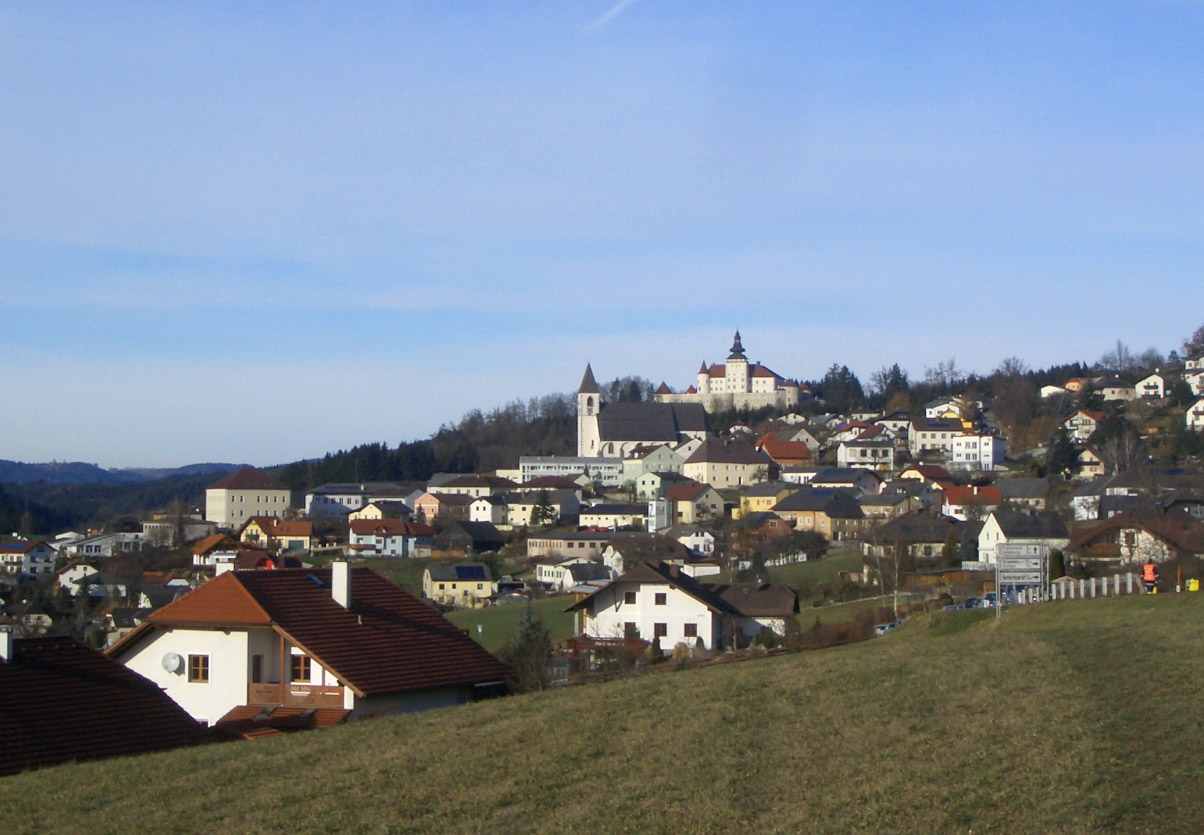
View on castle

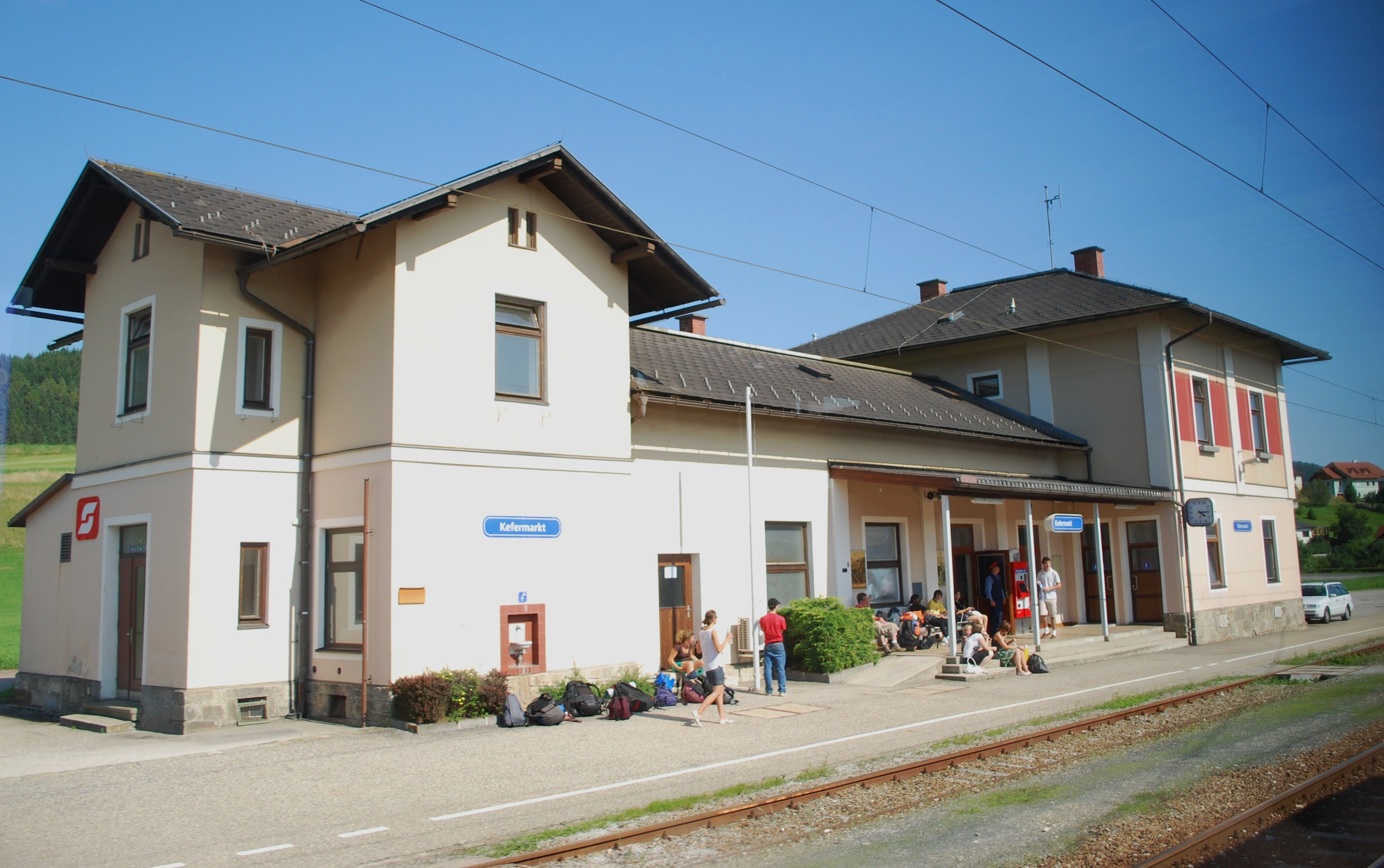
Railway station

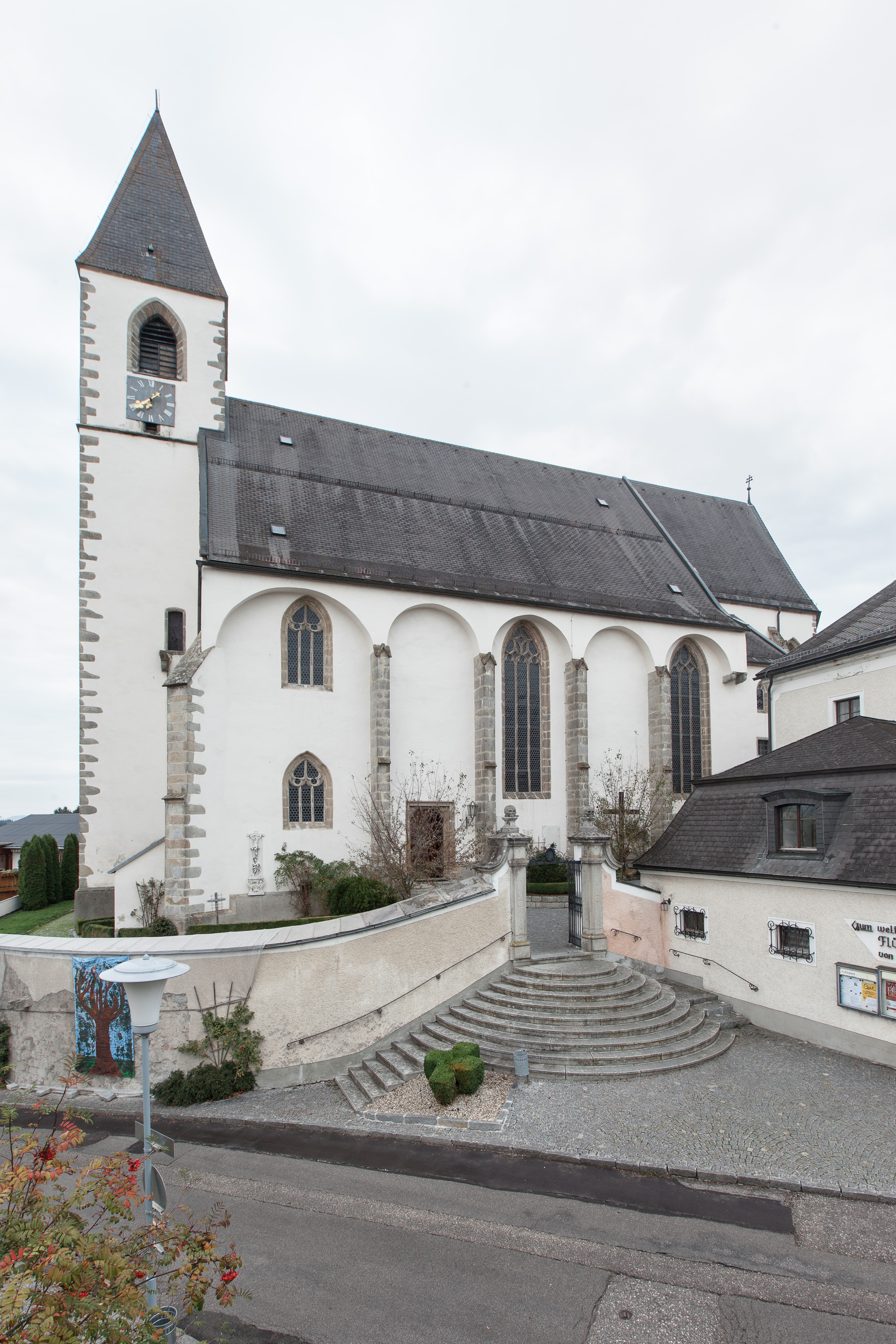
Pfarrkirche Kefermarkt

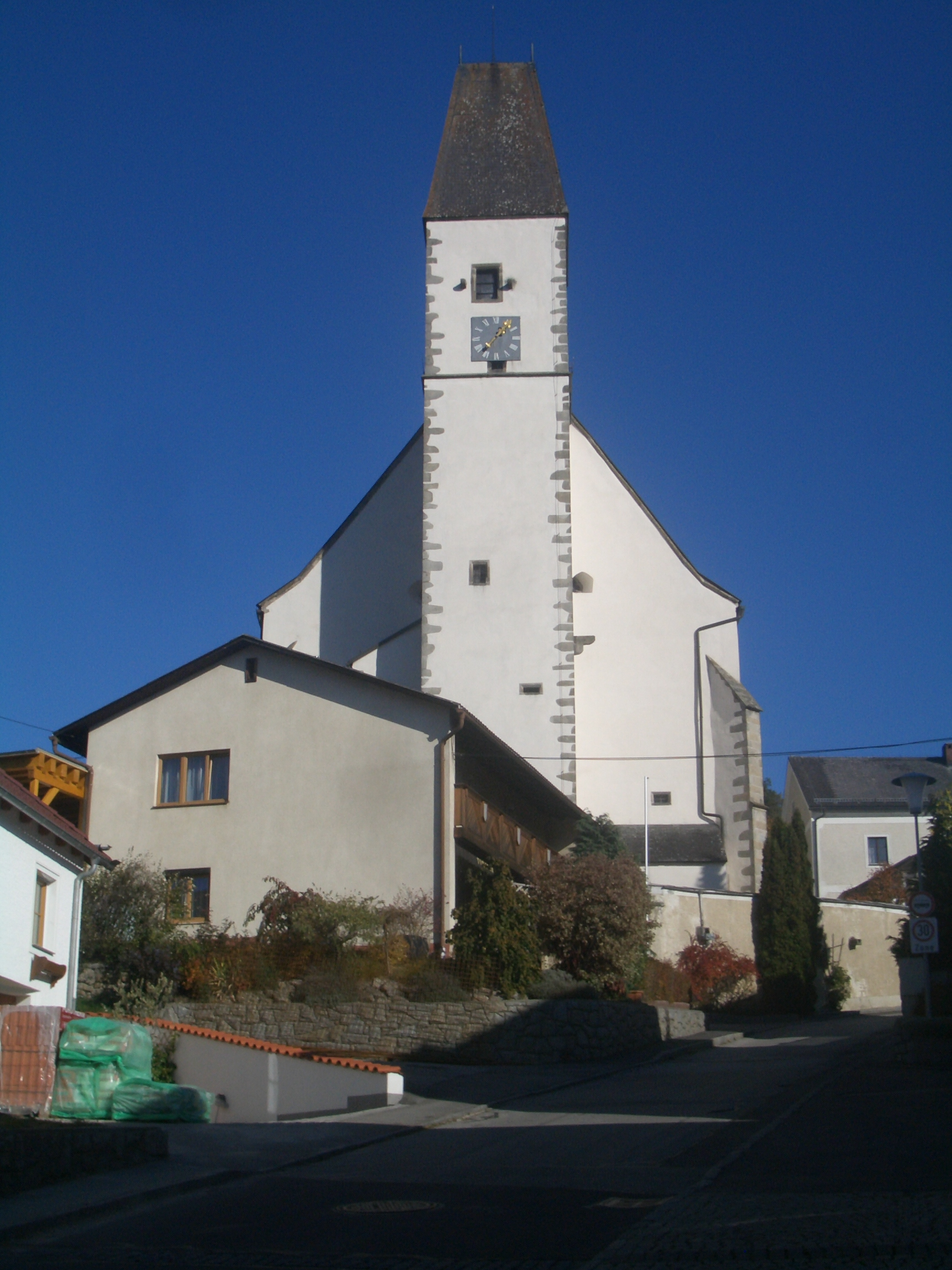
Pfarrkirche Kefermarkt

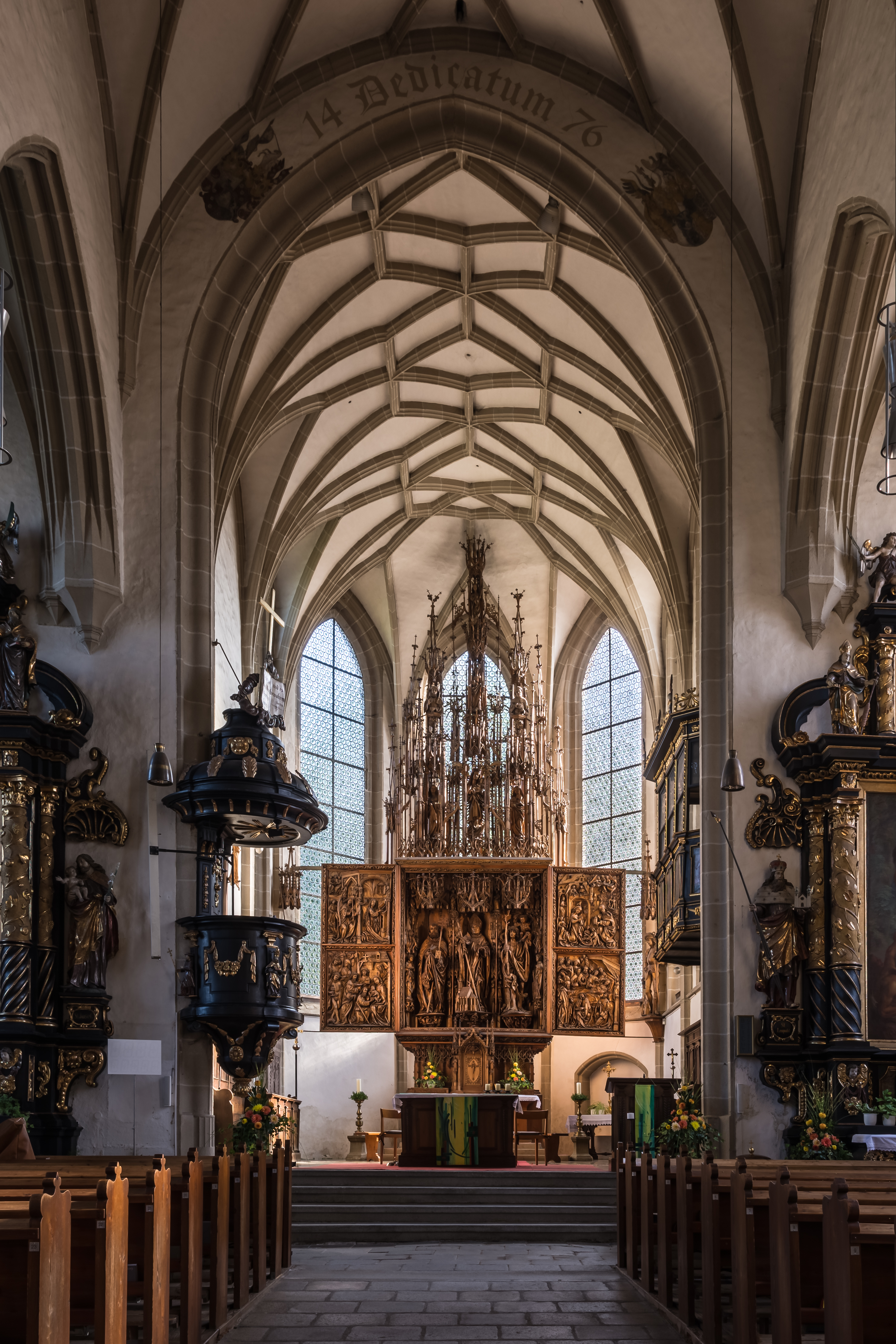
Inside of Pfarrkirche Kefermarkt

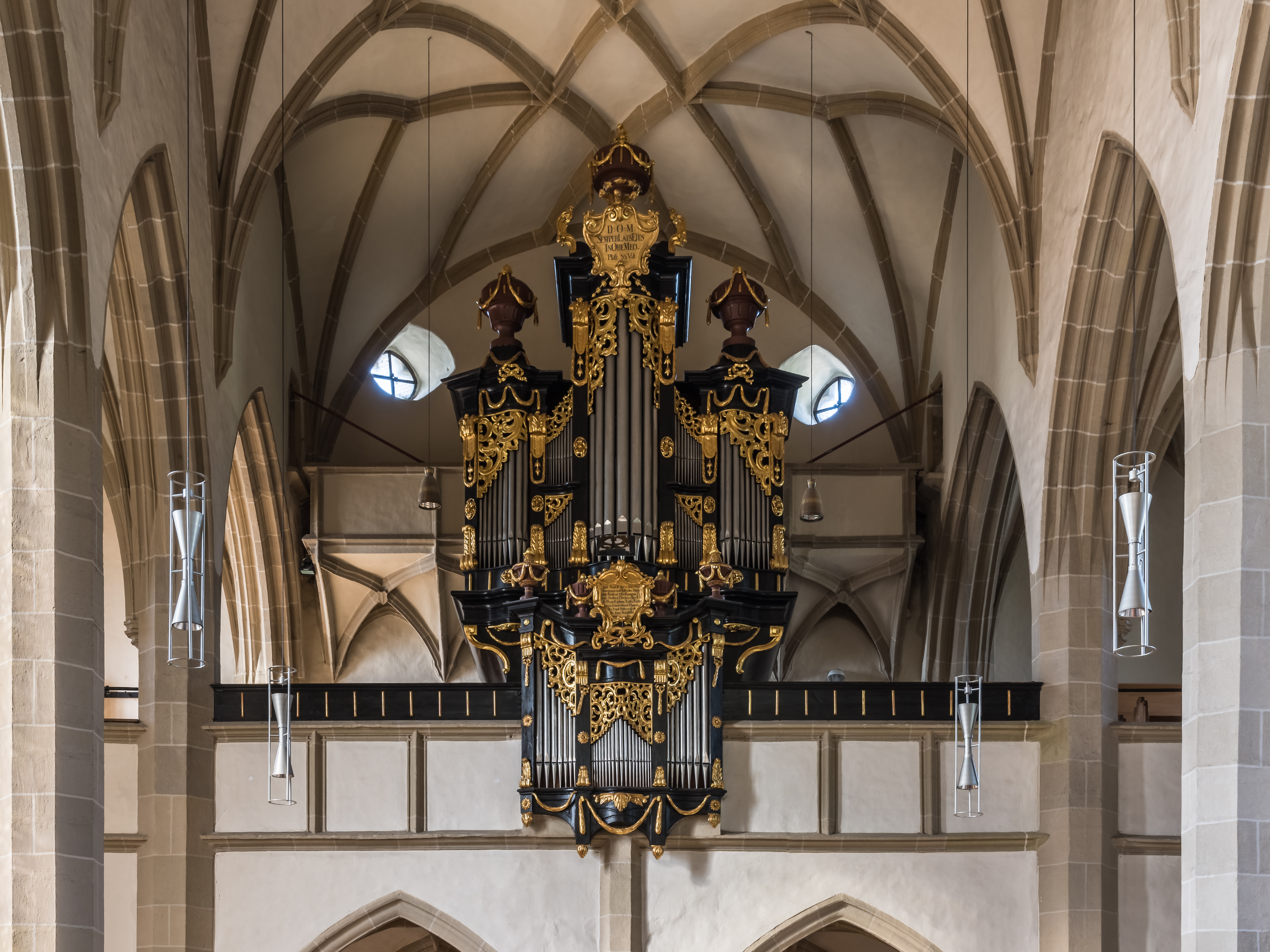
Organ

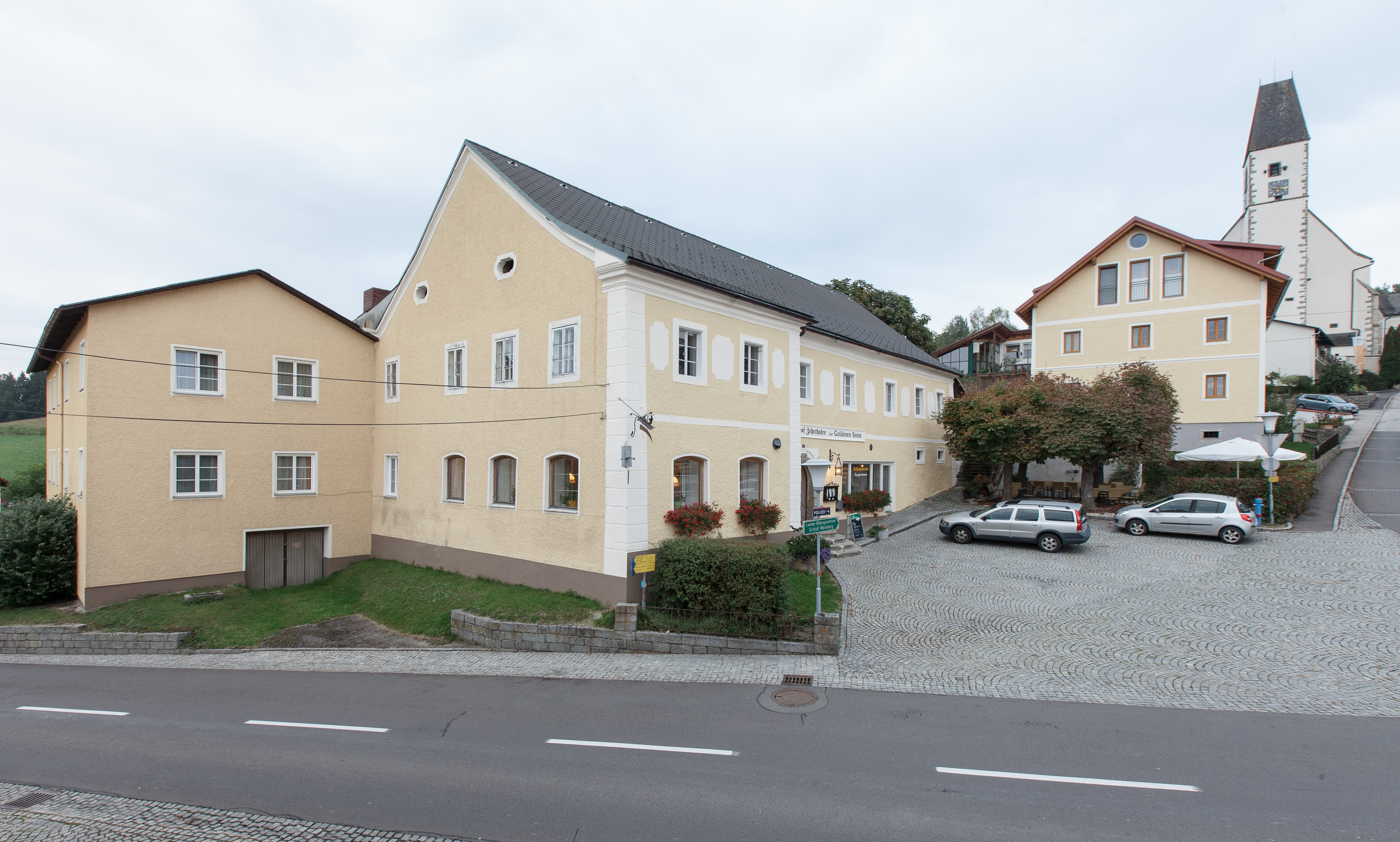
Guesthouse Gasthaus Zur Goldenen Sense Aussen

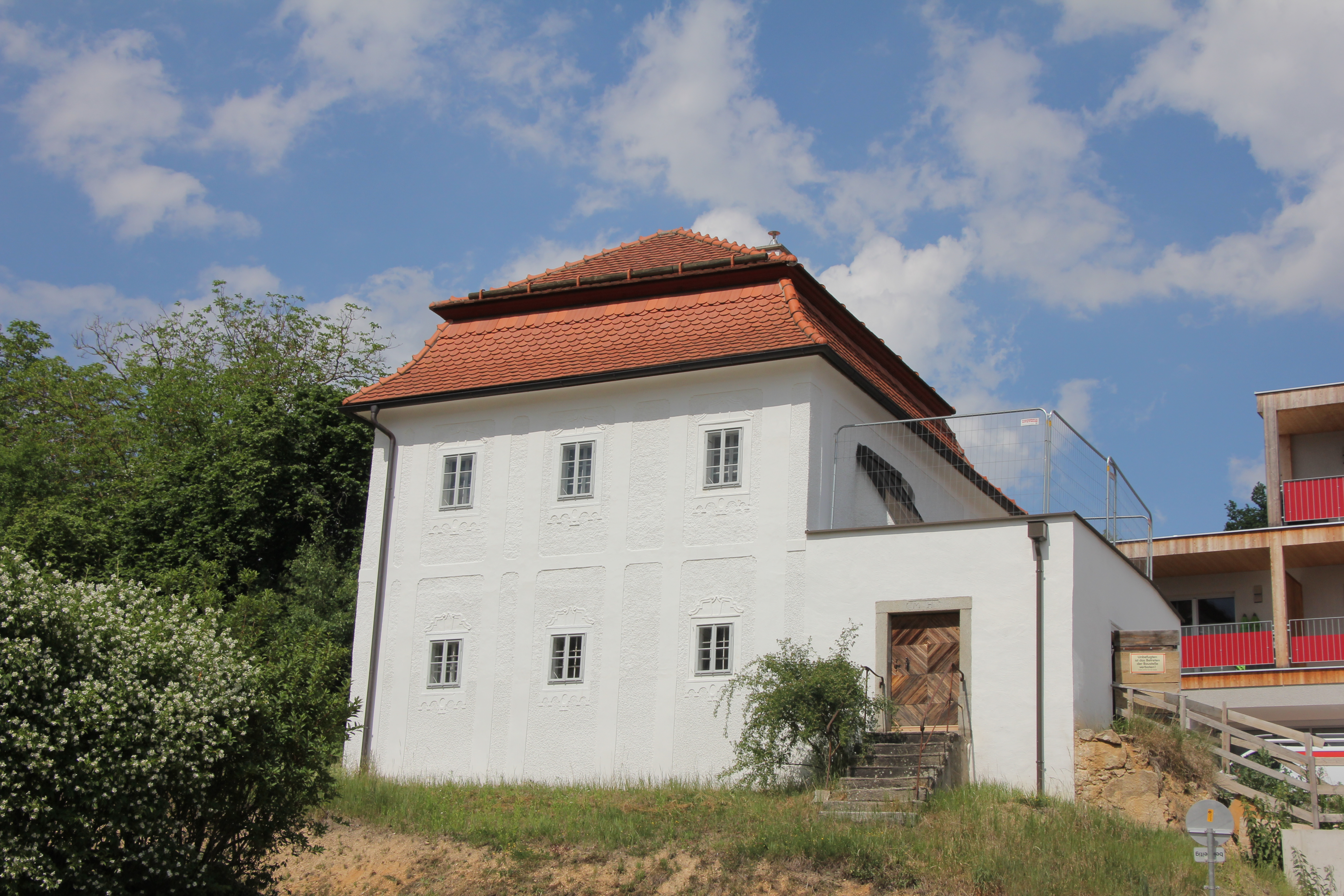
Kefermarkt evPfarrhof

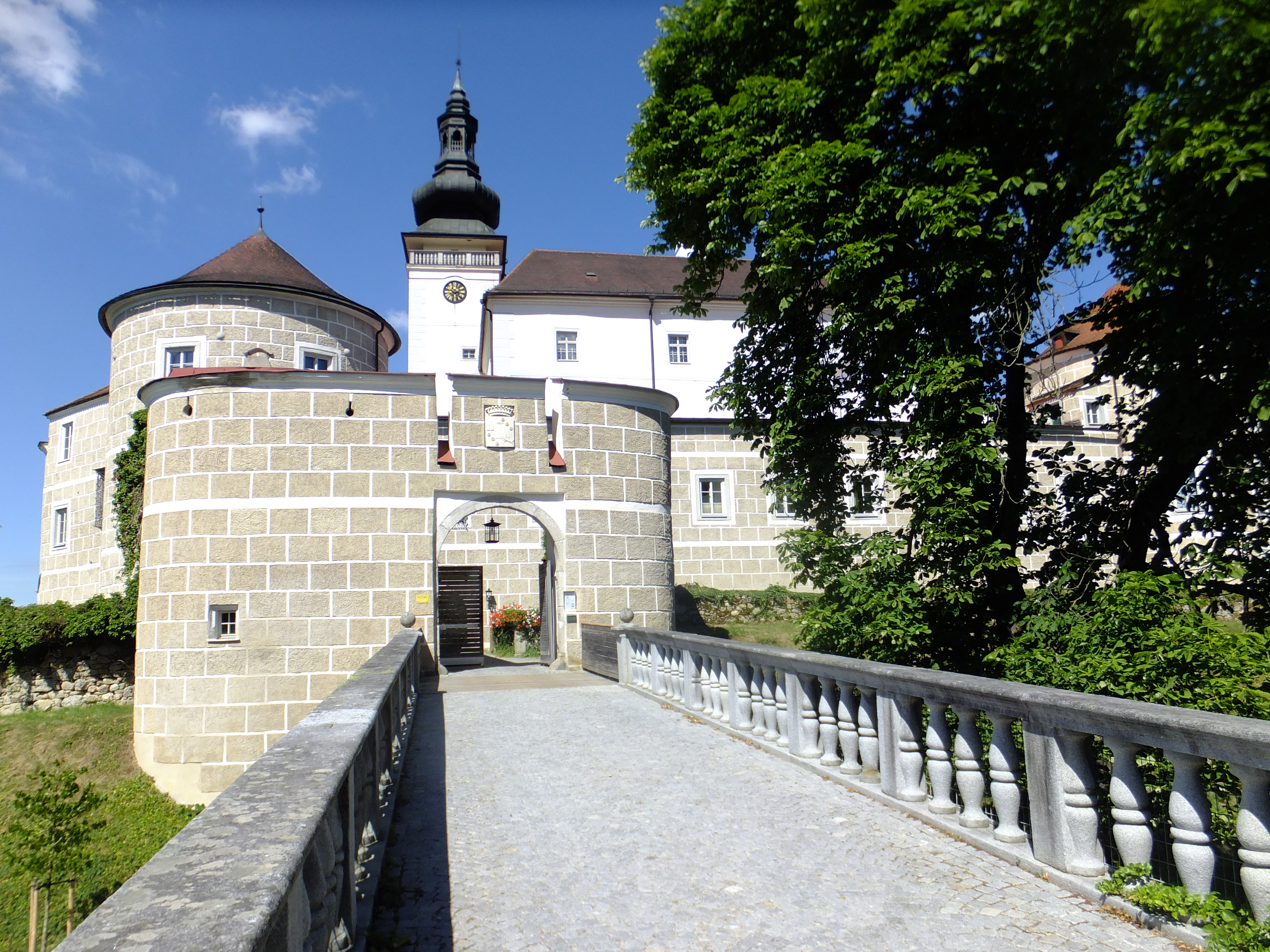
Bridge to Schloss Weinberg

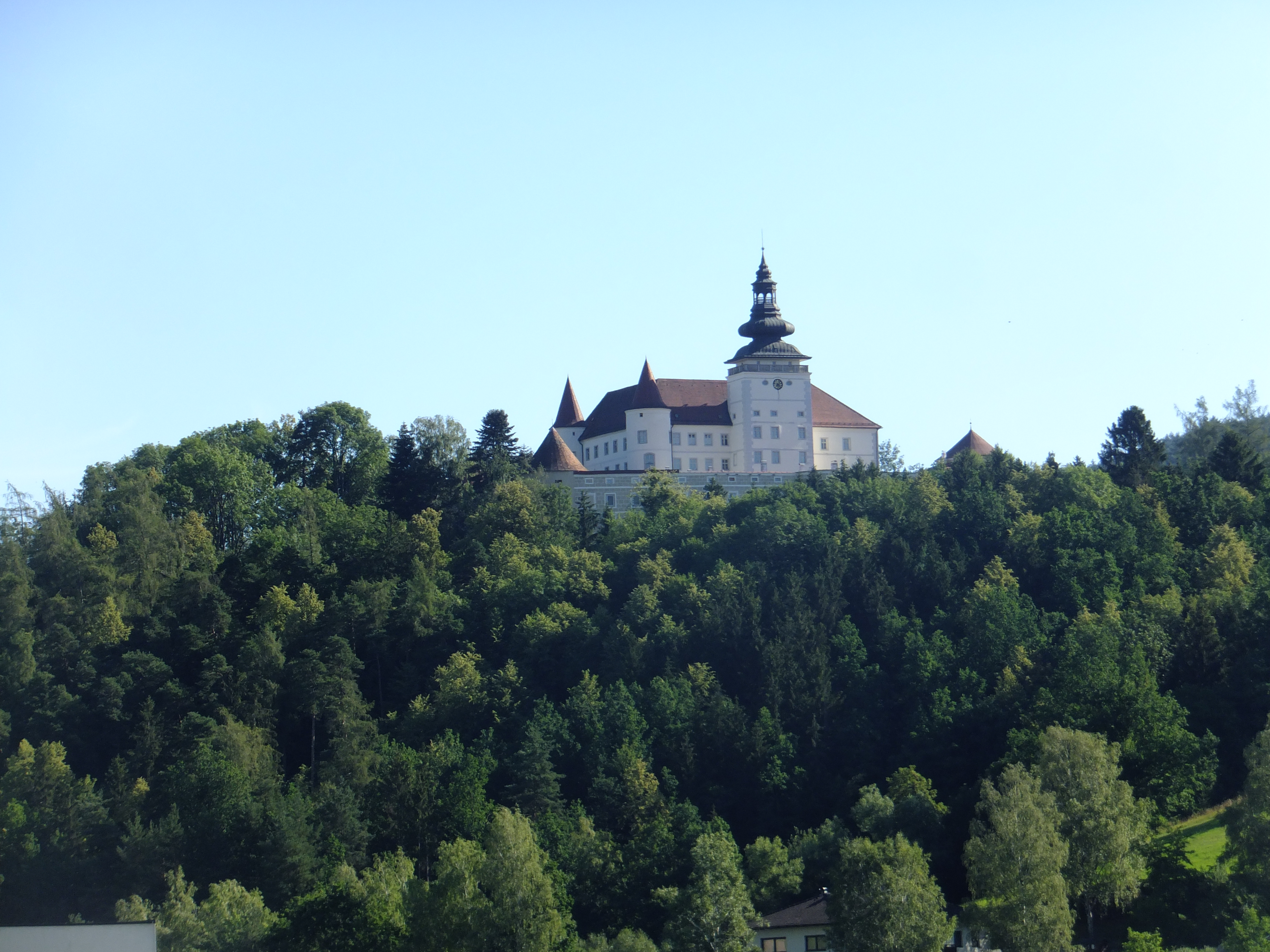
Castle Schloss Weinberg

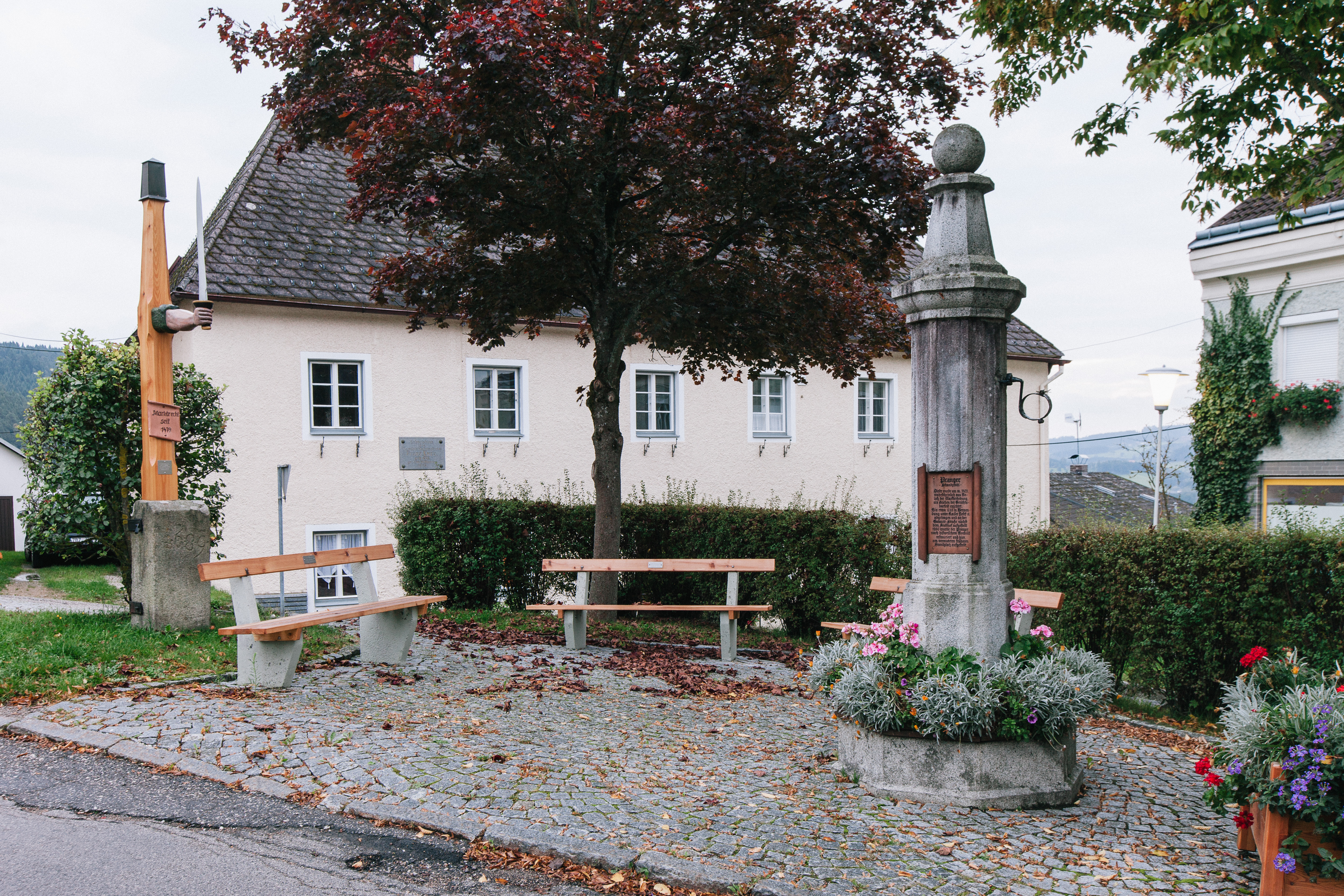
Pillory - Schandpfahl, was built in 1479, dismantled in 1738 and it was restored in 1980

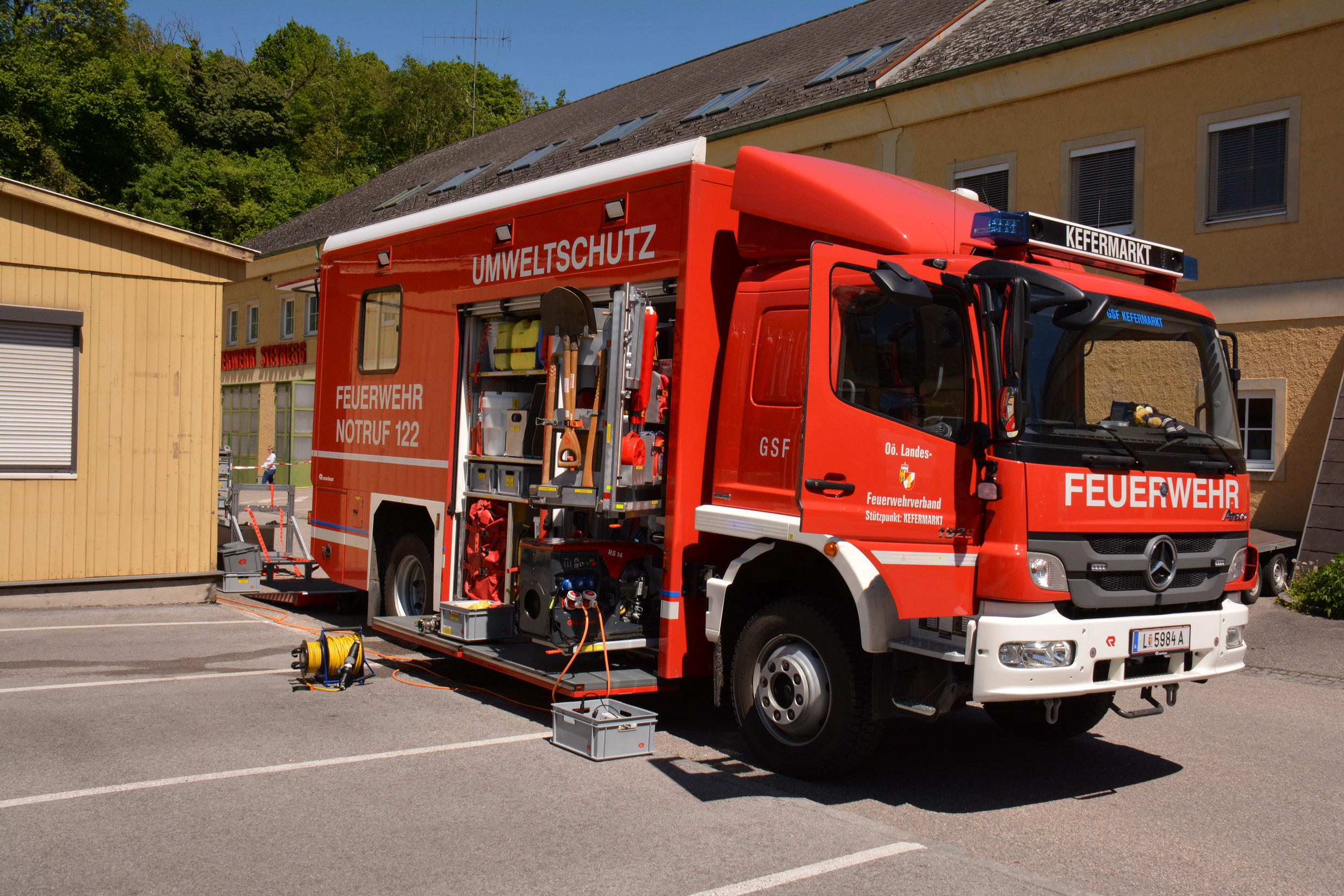
Fire service

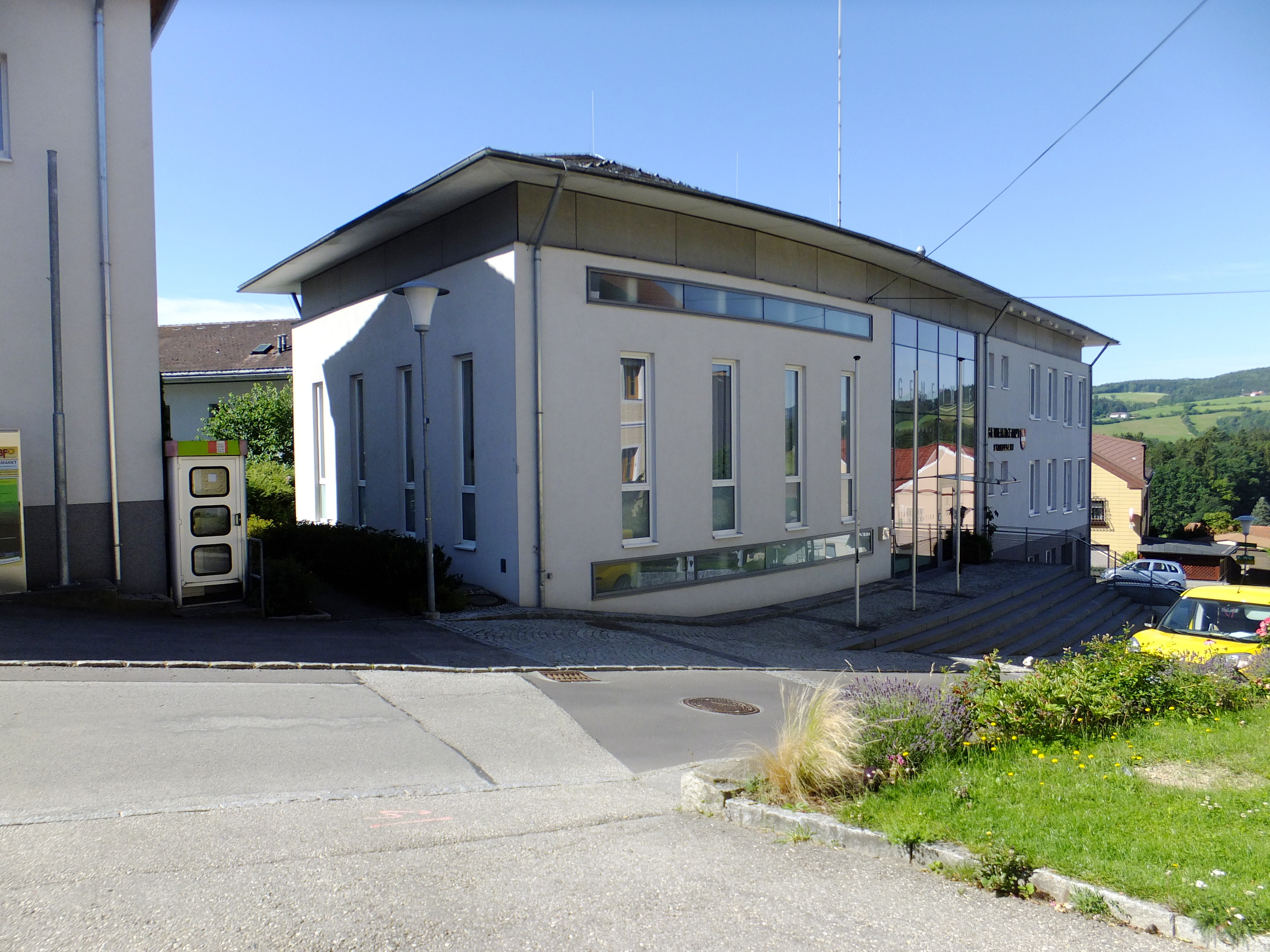
City hall

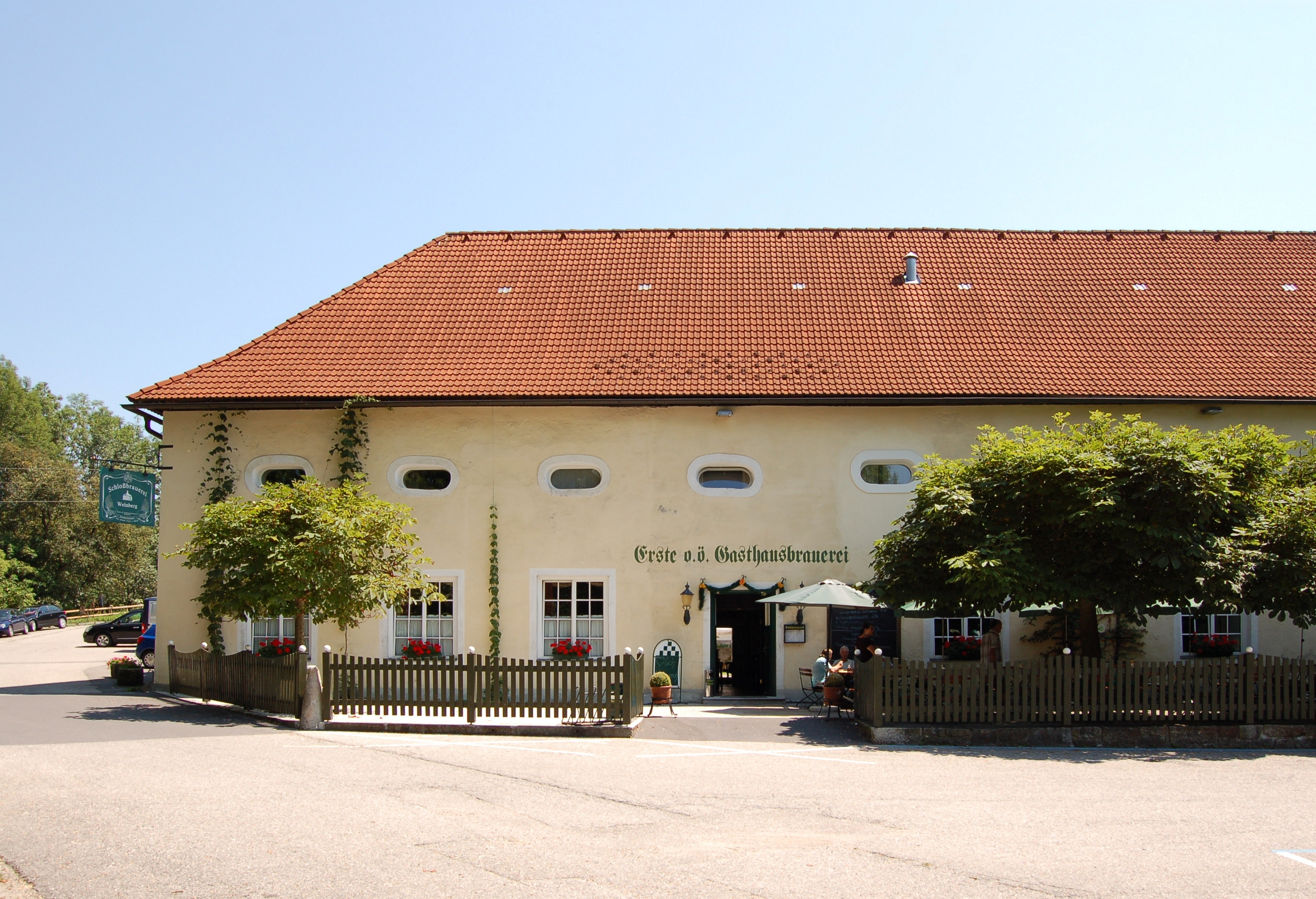
The castle brewery

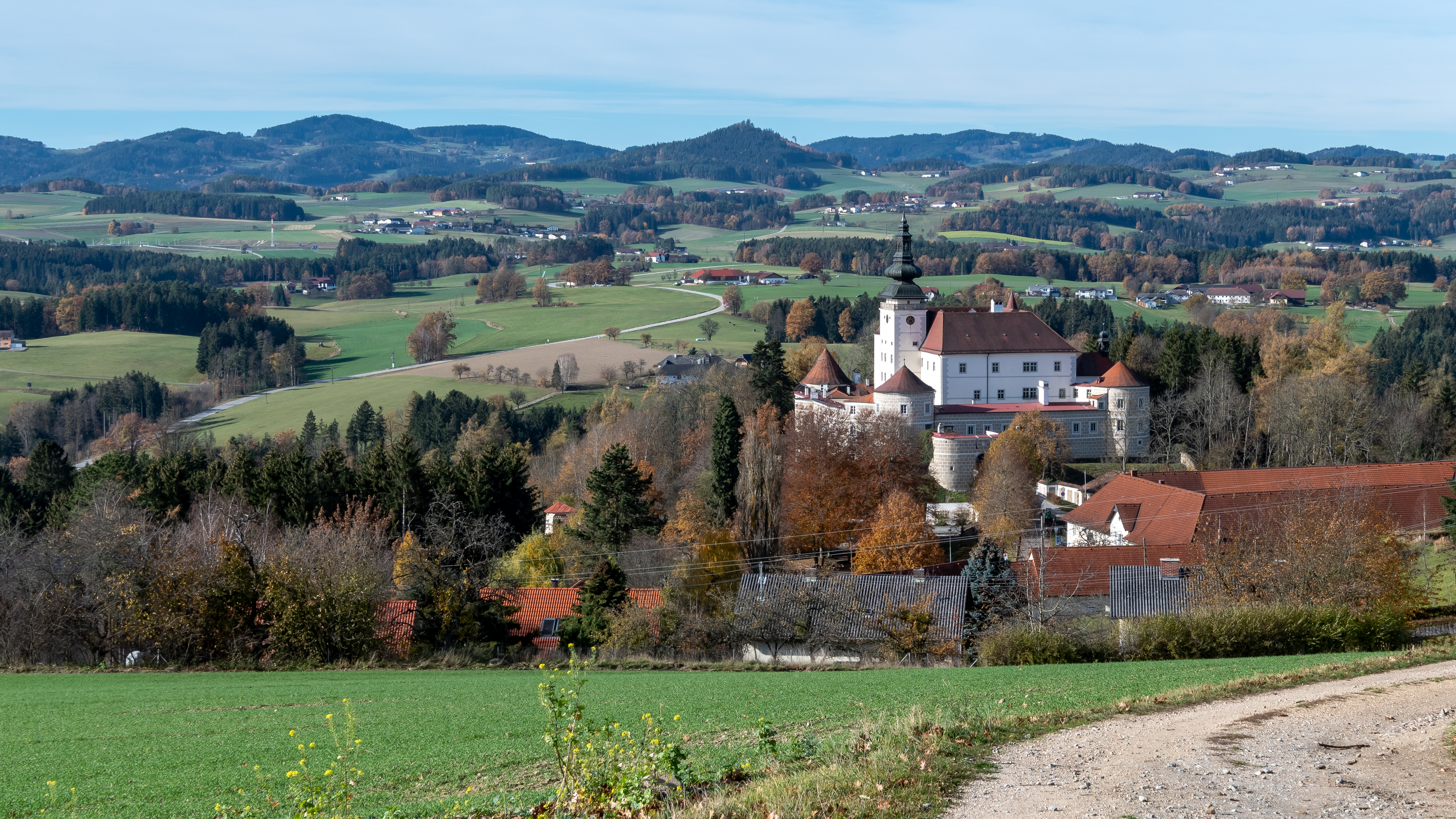
View over castle Weinberg to the west
