= *H₂éwsōs =

Proto-Indo-European dawn goddess

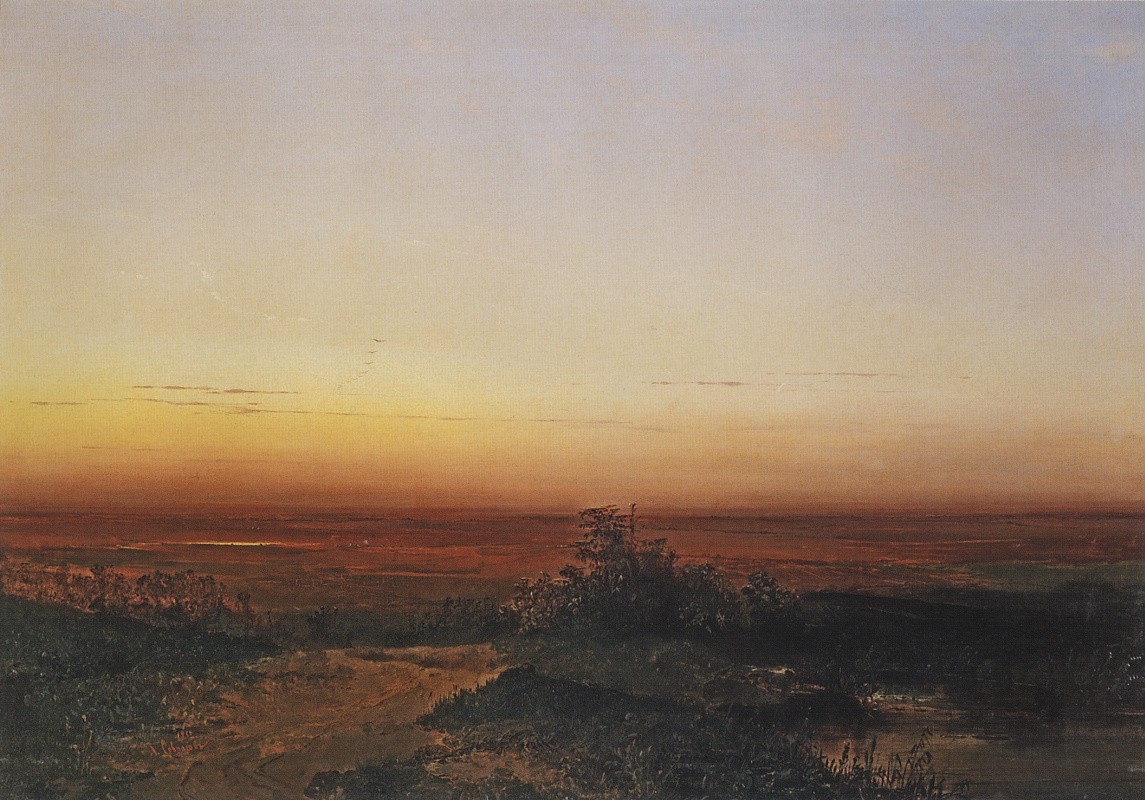
- The dawn rising on the Ukrainian steppes (1852), by Alexei Kondratievich Savrasov

Genealogy
- Parents: *Dyēus (father)

Equivalents
- Albanian: Prende
- Greek: Eos
- Hindu: Ushas
- Roman: Aurora
- Slavic: Zorya
- West Germanic: Ēostre
- Lithuanian: Aušrinė

*H₂éwsōs or *H_{a}éusōs (lit. 'the dawn'), romanized as Hausos, is the reconstructed name of the dawn goddess in Proto-Indo-European mythology.

Her attributes were subsequently expanded and adopted into female deities found in subsequent cultures and mythologies, including solar goddesses. *H₂éwsōs is believed to have been one of the most important deities worshipped by Proto-Indo-European speakers due to the consistency of her characterization in subsequent traditions.

== Name ==
=== Etymology ===
The reconstructed Proto-Indo-European name of the dawn, *h₂éwsōs, derives from the verbal root *h₂(e)wes- ('to shine', 'glow red', 'a flame') extended by the suffix *-ós-. The same root also underlies the word for 'gold', *h₂ews-om lit. 'glow', inherited in Latin aurum, Old Prussian ausis, and Lithuanian áuksas.

The word for the dawn as a meteorological event has also been preserved in the Balto-Slavic *auṣ(t)ro (cf. Lithuanian aušrà 'dawn', 'morning light', Proto-Slavic *ȕtro 'morning', 'dawn', Old Church Slavonic za ustra 'in the morning'); (Note: According to Horace Lunt (2001), the word jutro appears in Western Slavic languages (Serbo-Croatian, Slovenian and West Slavic), while útro exists in the Eastern languages (East Slavic languages, Bulgarian and Macedonian).) the Sanskrit uṣar ('dawn'); and in the Ancient Greek αὔριον ('tomorrow').

A derivative adverb, *h₂ews-teros, meaning "east" (lit. 'toward the dawn'), is reflected in the Latvian àustrums ('east'); Avestan ušatara ('east'); Italic *aus-tero- (compare Latin auster 'south wind, south'); Old Church Slavonic ustrŭ ('summer'); and the Germanic *austeraz (cf. Old Norse austr, English east, Middle High German oster). The same root seems to be preserved in the Baltic names for the northeast wind: Lith. auštrinis and Latvian austrenis, austrinis, austrinš. Also related are the Old Norse Austri, described in the Gylfaginning as one of four dwarves that guard the four cardinal points (with him representing the east), and Austrvegr ('The eastern way'), attested in medieval Germanic literature.

=== Epithets ===
A common epithet associated with *H₂éwsōs is *Diwós Dʰuǵh₂tḗr, meaning "Daughter of *Dyēus," the Proto-Indo-European sky god. Cognates stemming from the formulaic expression appear in multiple mythological traditions. Ushas was named as the "Daughter of Heaven" in the Rigveda; Eos was associated with the title "Daughter of Zeus" in Pre-Homeric Greece; "Daughter of Dievas" was ascribed to a Lithuanian sun goddess; and the Albanian goddess Prende was regarded as the daughter of the sky god Zojz.

== Evidence ==
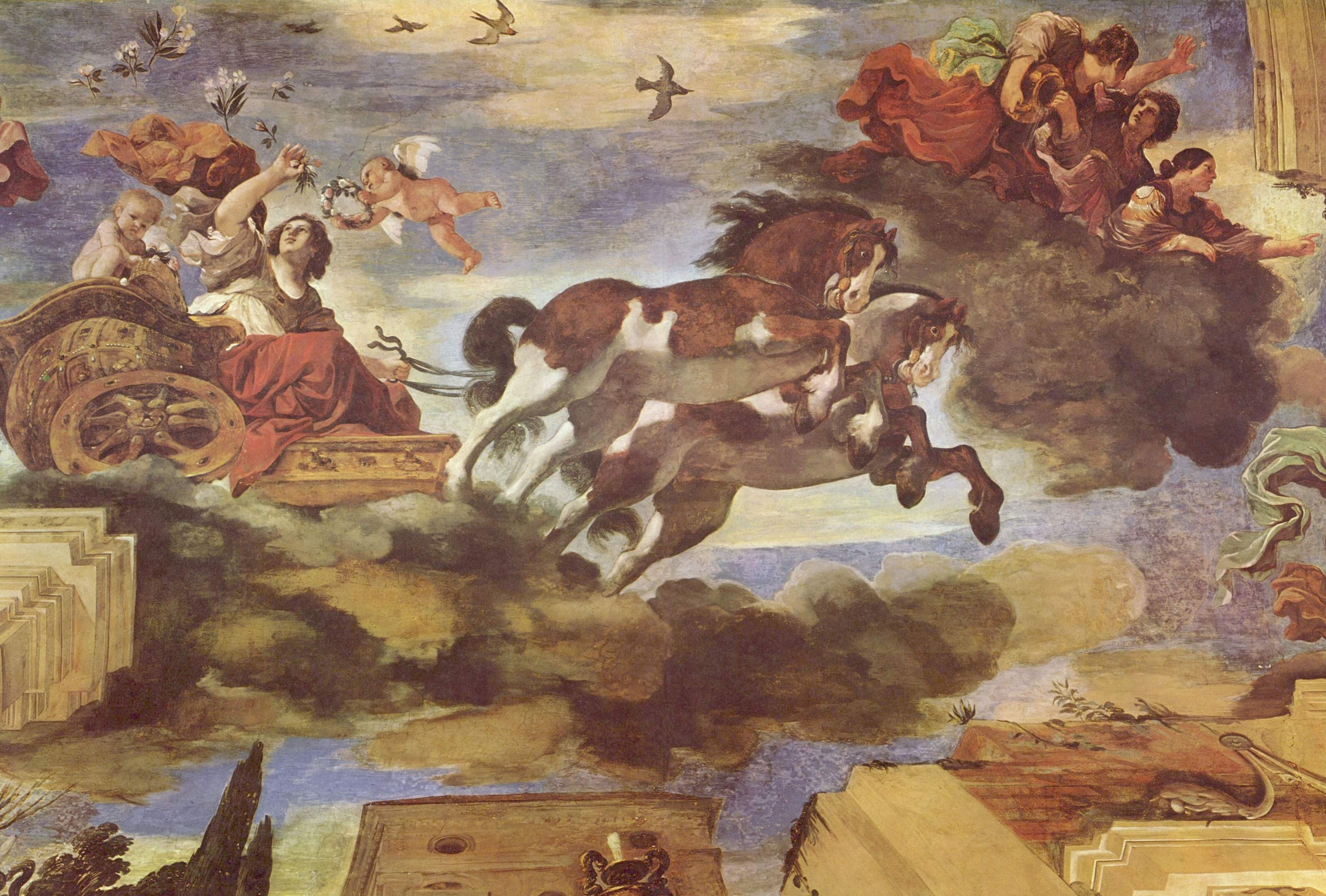
Aurora (1621) by Italian painter Guercino

Cognates stemming from the root *h₂éwsōs and associated with a dawn goddess are attested in the following cultures and mythologies:

- PIE: *h₂(e)wes-, meaning "to shine, light up, glow red; a flame",
  - PIE: *H₂éws-ōs, the Dawn-goddess
    - Indo-Iranian: *Hušas,
      - Vedic: Uṣás (उषस्), dawn goddess, and the most addressed goddess in the Rigveda, with twenty-one hymns.
      - Avestan: Ušå, honoured in one passage of the Avesta (Gāh 5. 5), and Ušahina, the angel separating midnight from the moment when the stars can become visible.
    - Hellenic: *Auhṓs
      - Greek: Ēṓs (Ἠώς), goddess of the dawn, and Aotis, an epithet used by the Spartan poet Alcman and interpreted as a dawn goddess.
        - Ancient Greek literature: fragments of works of poet Panyassis of Halicarnassus mention epithets Eoies ("He of the Dawn") and Aoos ('man of the dawn') in reference to Adonis, as a possible indicator of his Eastern origin; the name Aoos also appears as a son of Eos.
      - Mycenaean: the word a-wo-i-jo (Āw(ʰ)oʰios; Ἀϝohιος) (Note: Foreign scholars interpret this name as "matinal", "matutino", "mañanero", meaning "of the early morning", "of the dawn".) is attested in a tablet from Pylos; interpreted as a shepherd's personal name related to "dawn", or dative Āwōiōi;
    - Italic: *Ausōs > *Ausōs-ā (with an a-stem extension likely explained by the feminine gender)
      - Roman: Aurora, whose attributes are the same as the Greek Eos; the original motif of *h₂éwsōs may have been preserved in Mater Matuta. Eous or Eoös, an obscure poetic term meaning 'east' or 'oriental', is attested to in Lucan's Pharsalia, Hyginus's Fabulae, the Titanomachy, and as the name given to one of the Sun's horses in Ovid's Metamorphoses, (Note: According to Adalberto Magnavacca, the term Eous refers to the Morning Star (Venus), as it rises in the morning, but could also be used as another poetical term for aurora.)
    - Thracian: Auza-, attested in personal name Αυζα-κενθος (Auzakenthos 'dawn-child'), believed by linguists Vladimir I. Georgiev and Ivan Duridanov to attest the name of a Thracian dawn goddess.
  - PIE: *h₂ws-s-i, locative singular of *h₂éwsōs,
    - Armenian (Proto): *aw(h)i-, evolving as *awi̯ -o-, then *ayɣ^{w}o-,
      - Armenian: Ayg (այգ), goddess of the dawn.
    - Germanic: *Auzi/a-wandalaz, a personal name generally interpreted as meaning 'light-beam' or 'ray of light',
      - Old Norse: Aurvandil, whose frozen toe was made into a star by Thor,
      - Old English: Ēarendel, meaning "dawn, ray of light",
      - Old High German: Aurendil, Orentil; Lombardic: Auriwandalo,
      - Gothic: auzandil (𐌰𐌿𐌶𐌰𐌽𐌳𐌹𐌻), Morning Star, Lucifer ("light-bringer"),
  - PIE: *h₂ews-rom (or *h₂ews-reh₂), "matutinal, pertaining to the dawn",
    - Balto-Slavic: *Auṣ(t)ro,
      - Baltic: *Auš(t)ra, "dawn",
        - Lithuanian: Aušrinė, personification of the morning star, said to begin each day by lighting a fire for the sun; Aušra (sometimes Auska), goddess of sunrise, given as the answer to a Baltic riddle about a maiden who loses her keys; and Auštra (interpreted as "dawn" or "northeast wind"), a character in a fable that guards the entry to paradise.
        - Latvian: Auseklis (ausa "dawn" attached to the derivative suffix -eklis), personification of the morning star, and a reluctant goddess of the dawn; female personal names include Ausma and Austra; words ausma and ausmiņa denoting "Morgendämmerung" ('dawn, daybreak');
      - Slavic: *(j)ȕtro, "morning, dawn",
        - Polish: Jutrzenka or Justrzenka; Czech: Jitřenka, name and personification of the morning and evening star.
        - Polabians: Jutrobog (Latin: Jutry Bog or Jutrny Boh), literally "Morning God", a deity mentioned by German historians in the 18th century, and possibly (although disputed) Jüterbog: a town in east Germany named after the Slavic god.
        - Kashubians: Described as worshipping the god Jastrzebog and the goddess Jastra at Jastarnia, from which the Kashubian term for Easter, Jastrë, was derived. Their names may be related to the Polabian god Jutrobog, influenced by the Proto-Germanic deity *Austrōn, or derive from the word jasny ('bright').
    - Germanic: *Austrōn, goddess of the springtime celebrated during a yearly festival, at the origin of the word 'Easter' in some West Germanic languages,
      - Romano-Germanic: matronae Austriahenae, a name present in votive inscriptions found in 1958 in Germany.
      - Old English: Ēastre, personification of Easter.
      - Old High German: *Ōstara (pl. Ôstarûn), personification of Easter (Modern German: Ostern).
      - Old Saxon: *Āsteron, possibly attested in the name asteronhus ('Easter-house').

== Description ==
The attributes of the dawn goddess *H₂éwsōs are reconstructed using the common traits found in later Indo-European dawn goddesses, including those from Greek, Hindu, Slavic, and Baltic mythologies. One of the most common characteristics of the goddess was her radiance and brilliance, as she is almost always described as a "bringer of light". Various cognates associated with the goddess derive from the Proto-Indo-European root *bʰeh₂-, meaning "to glow", or "shine." More specifically, *H₂éwsōs was ascribed with the attribute "wide-shining" or "far-shining"— a trait possibly attested in the Greek theonym Euryphaessa ("wide-shining") and the Sanskrit poetic expression urviyắ ví bhāti ("[Ushas] shines out widely"). She was also closely associated with the colors of the dawn: gold, saffron, red, and crimson, and is frequently described as dancing.

Other traits attributed to *H₂éwsōs include her residence and vehicle. She is usually depicted dwelling on an island in the ocean or generally living in the east. The goddess is often described as driving some sort of vehicle pulled by horses, which later cultures typically adapted as a chariot. However, *H₂éwsōs likely drove a wagon or similar carrier, as chariot technology first appeared in the Sintashta culture (2100–1800 BC), and is generally associated with the Indo-Iranian peoples. In myth, the goddess uses her vehicle to bring the dawn or new day; she was also frequently depicted as refusing to bring the dawn, an act for which she is punished. Similarly, *H₂éwsōs is depicted as the opener of the doors or gates of heaven for her father, the sky god *Dyēus.

The spread hand as the image of the sun's rays in the morning may also be of Proto-Indo-European origin. The Homeric expressions 'rose-armed' (ῥοδόπηχυς) and 'rosy-fingered Dawn' (ῥοδοδάκτυλος Ἠώς), as well as Bacchylides' formula 'gold-armed' (χρυσοπαχύς), can be semantically compared with the Vedic formulas 'golden-handed' (híraṇyapāṇi) and 'broad-handed' (pṛthúpāṇi-). According to Martin L. West, "the 'rose' part is probably a Greek refinement."

== Later traditions ==
=== Greek and Roman tradition ===
==== Eos ====
In Greek mythology, Eos was the goddess and personification of the dawn. She is described as living "beyond the streams of Oceanus at the ends of the earth". A more precise location of her home is given in Homer's Odyssey, where Odysseus claims Eos lives at the mythical island of Aeaea, stating that it houses "the dwelling of early Dawn and her dancing-lawns (χοροί), and the risings of the sun". In the Hymn to Aphrodite, the home was described as having 'shining doors' (θύρας ... φαεινάς), behind which Eos locked her lover Tithonus. Homer also depicts Eos herself, wearing saffron-colored robes (κροκόπεπλος) and riding in a chariot pulled by a pair of horses named Lampos and Phaethon. Similarly, the Greek lyric poet Bacchylides calls her "white-horsed Dawn" (λεύκιππος Ἀώς). The colour and number of the horses varies between authors, with common colours being white and red.

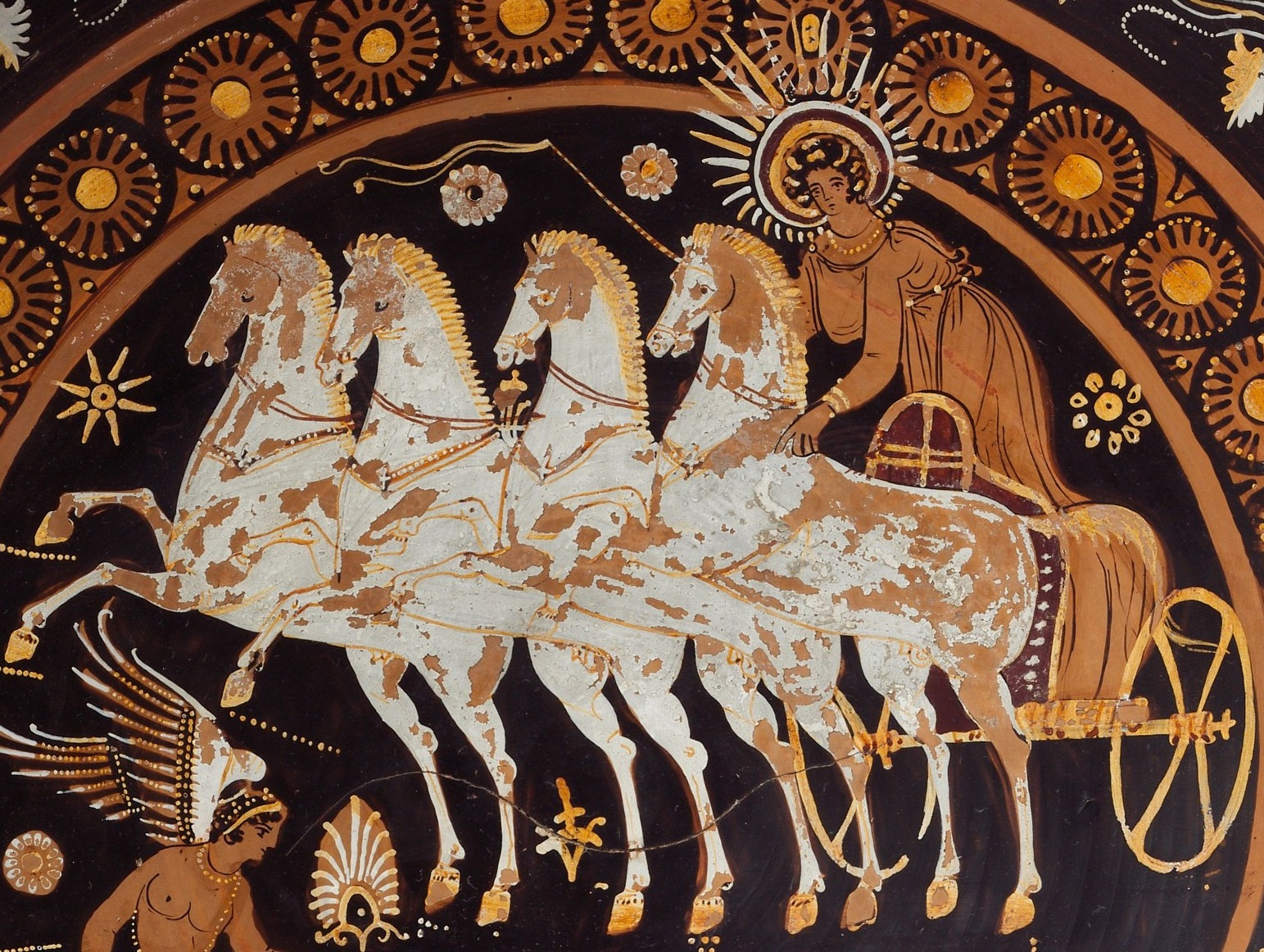
A terracotta lekanis dish (c. 4th century BCE) depicting Eos driving a chariot pulled by four white horses.

In the Iliad, "early-born", also translated as "born in the morning", (ἠριγένεια) is given as an epithet of Eos. In the Orphic Hymns, she is called φαινόλις ("light-bringing"), φαεσίμβροτος ("shining on mortals"), and λαμπρο-φαής ("bright-shining"). In Homeric formulas, she was also referred to as "gold-throned" (χρυσόθρονος).

==== Aphrodite ====
A possible mythological descendant of *H₂éwsōs may be Aphrodite, the Greek goddess of love and beauty. Scholars posit similarities based on her connection with a sky deity as her father— Zeus or Uranus— and her association with the colours red and gold. In the Iliad, Aphrodite is hurt by a mortal and her wounds are tended to by her mother Dione. Dione is seen as a female counterpart to Zeus, and is thought to etymologically derive from the Proto-Indo-European root *Dyeus.

==== Aurora ====
Aurora was the goddess of the dawn in Roman mythology, and the equivalent of the Greek Eos. Similar imagery is utilized when describing both goddesses, likely due to the Hellenization of Roman culture. In Ovid's Metamorphoses, Aurora opens the red doors (purpureas fores) to fill her rosy halls, and in Nonnus' Dionysiaca the goddess shakes off her sleep and leaves Cephalus in order to "open the gates of sunrise" (ἀντολίης ὤιξε θύρας πολεμητόκος Ἠώς). Ovid associates her with the colours yellow, red, and purple, and describes her as flāua ("the golden-yellow one") in his Amores. (Note: For further example: in the Aeneid, the sea or the waves flush red (rubescebat) as Aurora descends from high heavens 'shimmering yellow' (fulgebat lutea) in her 'rosy chariot' (in roseis ... bigis). Ovid describes her "purple hand" (purpurea ... manu) and "saffron hair" (croceis Aurora capillis). In Metamorphoses, the Dawn is moving on "saffron-wheels", and his poem Fasti tells of Aurora, "Memnon's saffron mother" (Memnonis ... lutea mater), as arriving on rosy horses (in roseis ... equis), and "with her rosy lamp" (cum roseam ... lampada) she expels the stars of the night. In The Golden Ass, Apuleius depicts the movement of Aurora as she began to soar through the skies "with her crimson trappings" (poenicantibus phaleris Aurora roseum). Ancient Greek poet Nonnus refers to the Dawn as "rose-crowned" (ῥοδοστεφέος, rhodostephéos) in his poem Dionysiaca. In Lucretius's De Rerum Natura, Book V, Latin deity Mater Matuta "spreads the rosy morning" (roseam Matuta ... auroram differt), and the author poetically describes the sunrise, i.e., colours changing from red to gold, at dawn (aurea cum primum ... matutina rubent radiati lumina solis). In an Orphic Hymn (77/78), the goddess Eos is said to be 'blushing red' or 'reddening' (ἐρυθαινομένη).) Similarly to Eos, Aurora drives a biga or a rosy-red quadriga in Virgil's Aeneid.

=== Indo-Iranian tradition ===
Ushas is the Rigvedic and Vedic goddess of the dawn in Hinduism. In the ancient Rigveda, she is described as the daughter of the sky god Dyáuṣ, born from the harnessing of the Aśvins. She is described as "the Dawn's shine" (bhānty Usásah); the dawn is "gold-coloured" (híraṇya-varṇā); and she throws on embroidered garments "like a dancer" (nṛtūr iva). She wears crimson garments and a gleaming gold veil. In the Samaveda, she is described as "red, like mare"; she shots "ruddy beams of light", "yokes red steeds to her car"," and "harnesses the red cows." Her horses are said to be pale red, ruddy, yellowish, or reddish-yellow in Vedic traditions.

The Avesta refers to a mythical eastern mountain called "Dawn-house" (Ušidam). TheYasnas also mention a mountain named Ušidarɘna, possibly meaning "crack of dawn" (as a noun) or "having reddish cracks" (as an adjective).

=== Baltic tradition ===
==== Saulė ====
In Latvian and Lithuanian mythology, Saulė is the goddess of the sun. In Baltic folklore, Saulė is said to live in a silver-gated castle at the end of the sea, located somewhere in the east, or to go to an island in the middle of the sea for her nocturnal rest. In folksongs, Saulė sinks into the bottom of a lake in a silver cradle to sleep "in the white seafoam". (Note: According to Daiva Vaitkevičienė, this imagery is also related to the rebirth of souls in Baltic mythology.) (Note: The Otherworld in Latvian mythology is named Viņsaule 'The Other Sun', a place where the sun goes at night and also the abode of the dead.)

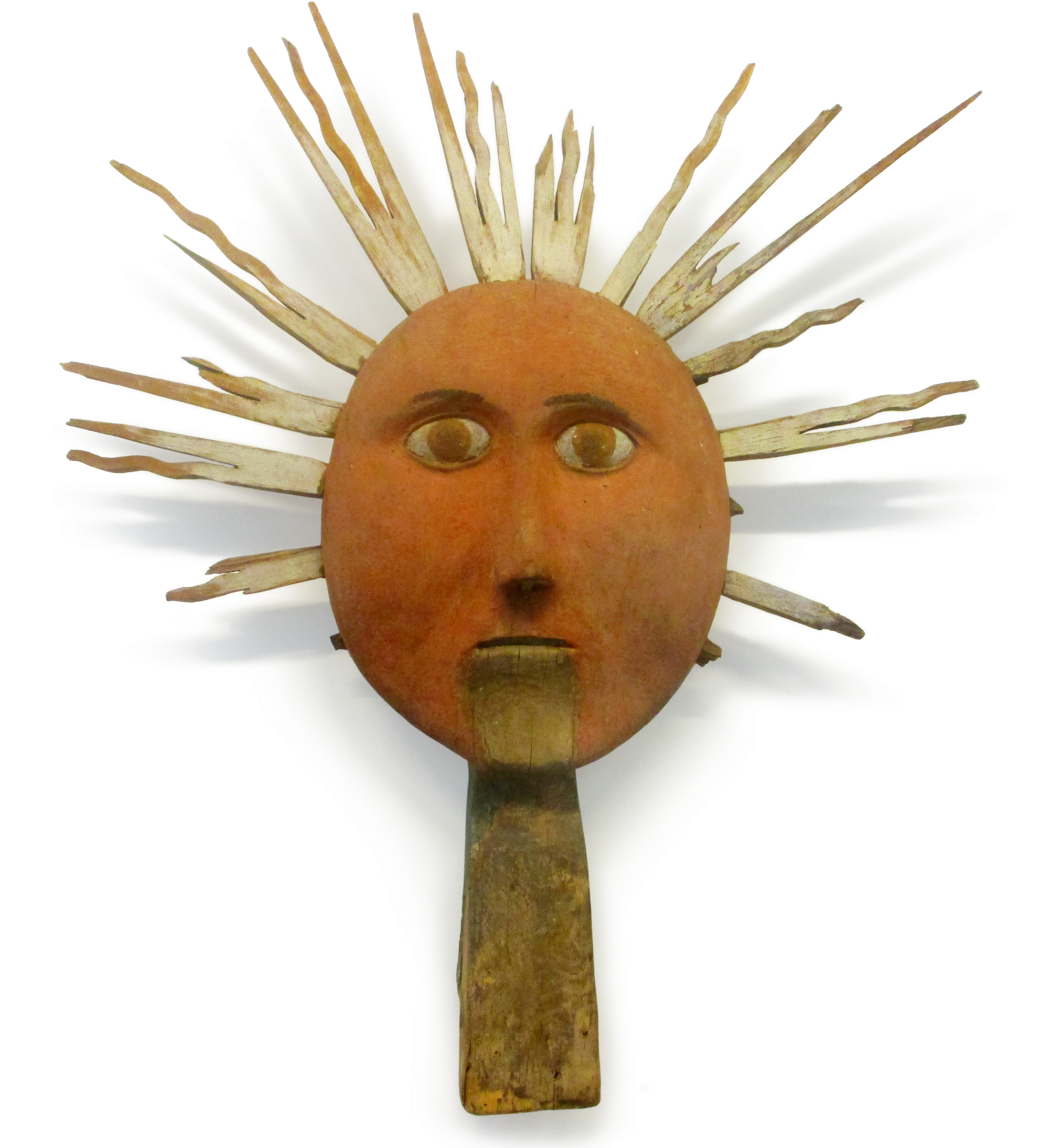
Early 20th century idol of Saulė from Palūšė, Ignalina District in Lithuania.

In the Lithuanian tradition, the sun is portrayed as a "golden wheel" or a "golden circle" that rolls down the mountain at sunset. Saulé is also described as being dressed in clothes woven with "threads of red, gold, silver and white". (Note: Saulė is also said to own golden tools and garments: slippers, scarf, belt and a golden boat she uses as her means of transportation. Other accounts ascribe her golden rings, golden ribbons, golden tassels and even a golden crown. In Latvian folksongs, she is also depicted in a silver, gold or silk costume, and wearing a sparkling crown.) In Latvian folk songs, Saulė and her daughter(s) are dressed of shawls woven with gold thread, and Saulė wears shoes of gold, which parallels the Greek poet Sappho describing Eos as χρυσοπέδιλλος ("golden-sandalled"). The goddess is portrayed as dancing in her gilded shoes on a silver hill, and her fellow Baltic goddess Aušrinė is said to dance on a stone for the people on the first day of summer. Saulė is sometimes portrayed as waking up 'red' (sārta) or 'in a red tree' during the morning. Her association with red may represent the "fiery aspect" of the sun: the setting and the rising sun are equated with a rose wreath and a rose in bloom, due to their circular shapes. (Note: According to Lithuanian scholar Daiva Vaitkeviciene, Wilhelm Mannhardt's treatise on Latvian solar myths identified other metaphors for the Sun, such as "a golden apple", "a rose bush", and "red berries".) (Note: In some Latvian folksongs, the personified female Sun is also associated with the color "white" (Latv balt-), such as the imagery of a white shirt, the expression "mila, balte" ("Sun, dear, white"), and the description of the trajectory of the sun (red as it rises, white as it journeys on its way).)

Saulė drives a carriage with copper-wheels, a "gleaming copper chariot", or a golden chariot pulled by untiring horses. Alternately, she has been described as driving a "sleigh" (kamaņiņa) made of fish bones. The goddess is portrayed driving her shining car on the way to her husband, the Moon. In other accounts, she is said to sail the World Sea on a silver or golden boat, which, according to legend, is what her chariot transforms into for her night travels. In a Latvian folk song, Saulė hangs her sparkling crown on a tree in the evening and enters a golden boat to sail away.

The goddess' horses are commonly said to be white in colour; in other accounts they are described as three horses with golden, silver and diamond coats. In Latvian folk songs (dainas), her horses are described as having hooves and bridles of gold, and coats that are yellow, golden, or bay in colour: "reflect[ing] the hues of the bright sky". When she begins her nocturnal journey through the World Sea, her chariot changes into a boat and "the Sun swims her horses".

==== Aušrinė ====
In Lithuanian mythology, Aušrinė is the goddess of the morning star (Venus) who prepares the way for Saulė each morning. In one myth, a man named Joseph becomes fascinated with Aušrinė, and goes on a quest to find the 'second sun', who is actually a maiden that lives on an island in the sea and has the same hair as the Sun.

=== Slavic tradition ===
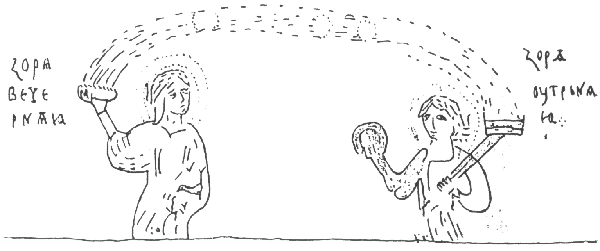
Image from the Chludov Psalter depicting the evening and morning Zoryas.

According to Russian folklorist Alexander Afanasyev, the figure of the Dawn in Slavic tradition is varied: she is described in a Serbian folksong as a maiden sitting on a silver throne in the water, her legs of a yellow color and her arms of gold. In a Croatian fairy tale, the Zora-djevojka ("Dawn-maiden") "sails the sea in the early morning in her boat of gold with a silver paddle" (alternatively, a silver boat with golden oars) and sails back to Buyan, the mysterious island where she dwells.

==== Zorya ====
In Slavic paganism, Zorya is the personification and guardian deity of the dawn. She is also depicted as a beautiful golden-haired woman who lives in a golden kingdom "at the edge of the White World", and rows through the seas with her silver boat and golden oar (alternatively, a golden boat and silver oar). The home of Zorya is commonly believed to be on the island of Buyan, where her brother, the Sun, dwelt along with his attendants: the North, West and East winds. Although Zorya is not described driving a chariot or wagon pulled by horses, she is still described in a tale as preparing the "fiery horses" of the Sun at the beginning and end of the day. Some versions of her myth split the functions of the goddess into two versions or sisters: Zorya Utrennyaya, the goddess of the dawn, and Zorya Vechernyaya, the goddess of the dusk.

In a Russian saying, Zorya is invoked as a krasnaya dyevitsa (красная девица "red maiden"), and in another story, Zorya sits on a golden chair and holds a silver disk or mirror (identified as the sun). In other stories, a maiden sits on the white-hot stone Alatyr in Buyan, weaving red silk. More specifically, the maiden is described as the "rose-fingered" Zorya, who, with her golden needle, weaves a veil over the sky in rosy and "blood-red" colours using a thread of "yellow ore". (Note: Afanasyev used the word "рудо-желтую" (rudo-zheltuyu). The first part of the word, "рудо", means "ore", and Afanasyev considered it a cognate to similar words in other Indo-European languages: Ancient Greek erythros, Sanskrit rudhira, Gothic rauds, Lithuanian raudonas, German (Morgen)rothe.) (Note: Some holdover of a female solar goddess may exist in Slavic tradition: in songs, the sun is portrayed as a maiden or bride, and, in a story, when a young woman named Solntse covers herself with a heavy cloak, it darkens, and when she puts on a shining dress, it brightens again. In addition, in Belarusian folk songs, the Sun is called Sonca and referred to as a 'mother'.)

=== Germanic tradition ===
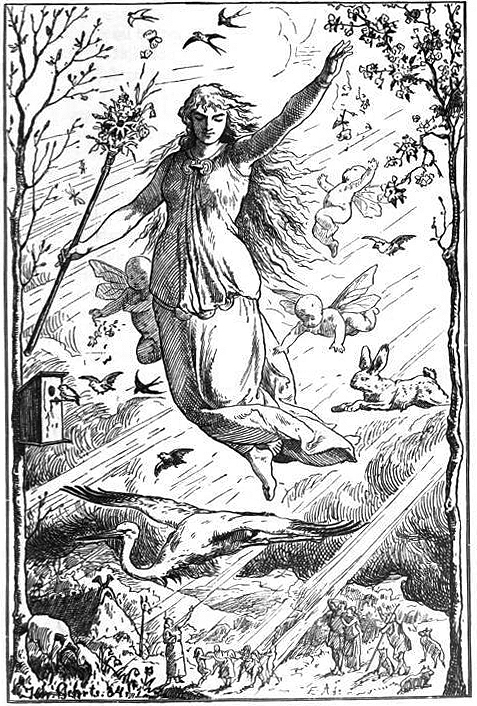
1884 illustration of the Germanic goddess Ostara by Johannes Gehrts

Remnants of the root *haeus and its derivations survive in onomastics of the Middle Ages. A medieval French obituary from the 12th century, from Moissac, in Occitania, registers compound names of Germanic origin that contain root Aur- (e.g., Auraldus) and Austr- (e.g., Austremonius, Austrinus, Austris). Names of Frankish origin are attested in a "polyptyque" of the Abbey of Saint-Germain-des-Prés, containing aust- (sometimes host- or ost-) and austr- (or ostr- > French out-). Germanic personal names in Galicia and Iberian toponyms with prefix aus-, astr- and aust- (> ost-) also attest the survival of the root well into medieval times.

=== Balkan tradition ===
In Albanian paganism, Prende is the goddess of the dawn whose name traces back to the PIE *pers-é-bʰ(h₂)n̥t-ih₂ ("he who brings the light through"), from which the Ancient Greek Περσεφόνη (Persephone), is considered to have descended from. Prende is also called Afër-dita— an Albanian phrase meaning "near day" or "dawn". Afërdita also serves as the native name for the planet Venus. The Albanian imperative form afro dita 'come forth the dawn' traces back to Proto-Albanian apro dītā 'come forth brightness of the day/dawn', from PIE *h₂epero déh₂itis. According to linguist Václav Blažek, the Albanian word (h)yll ("star") finds a probable ultimate etymology in the root *h₂ews- ("dawn"), specifically through *h₂ws-li ("morning-star'), which implies the quite natural semantic evolution 'dawn' > 'morning star' > 'star'.

In Albanian mythology, Prende is pulled across the sky in her chariot by swallows, called Pulat e Zojës ("the Lady's Birds"), which are connected to the chariot by the rainbow (Ylberi), which is also known as Brezi or Shoka e Zojës ("the Lady's Belt").

=== Celtic tradition ===
A character named Gwawrdur is mentioned in the Mabinogion tale of Culhwch and Olwen. Stefan Zimmer suggests either a remnant of the Dawn goddess or a name meaning "(with) the color of steel", since gwawr may also mean 'color, hue, shade'. The name also appears in the Canu Aneirin under the variants Gwardur, Guaurud, Guaurdur, (G)waredur, or (G)waledur. All of these stem from the Middle Welsh gwawr ('dawn'; also 'hero, prince'). According to linguist Ranko Matasović, the latter derives from Proto-Celtic *warī- ('sunrise, east', cf. Middle Irish fáir), itself from the PIE root *wōsr- ('spring').

=== Others ===
Scholars have argued that the Roman name Aurēlius (originally Ausēlius, from Sabine *ausēla 'sun') and the Etruscan sun god Usil (probably of Osco-Umbrian origin) may be related to the Indo-European word for the dawn. A figure in Belarusian tradition named Аўсень (Ausenis) and related to the coming of spring is speculated to be cognate to *Haeusos.

== Poetic and liturgic formula ==
An expression of formulaic poetry can be found in the Proto-Indo-European expression *h₂(e)ws-sḱeti ('it dawns'), attested in Lithuanian aušta and aũšti, Latvian àust, Avestan usaitī, or Sanskrit ucchāti. (Note: This reflex may also exist with Hittite verbs uhhi, uskizzi and aus-zi 'to see'.) The poetic formula 'the lighting dawn' is also attested in the Indo-Iranian tradition: Sanskrit uchantīm usásam, and Young Avestan usaitīm uṣ̌ā^{̊}ŋhəm. A hapax legomenon uşád-bhiḥ (instr. pl.) is also attested.

Other remnants of the root *h₂éws- are present in the Zoroastrian prayer to the dawn Hoshbām, and in Ušahin gāh (the dawn watch), sung between midnight and dawn. In Persian historical and sacred literature, namely, the Bundahishn, in the chapter about the genealogy of the Kayanid dynasty, princess Frānag, in exile with "Frēdōn's Glory" after escaping her father's murderous intentions, promises to give her firstborn son, Kay Apiweh, to "Ōšebām". Ōšebām, in return, saves Franag. In the Yasht about Zam, the Angel of the Munificent Earth, a passage reads upaoṣ̌ā^{̊}ŋhə ('situated in the rosy dawn'), "a hypostatic derivation from unattested *upa uṣ̌āhu 'up in the morning light(s)'".

A special carol, zorile ("dawn"), was sung by the colindători (traditional Romanian singers) during funerals, imploring the Dawns not be in a hurry to break, or begging them to prevent the dead from departing this world. The word is of Slavic origin, with the term for 'dawn' attached to the Romanian article -le.

Stefan Zimmer suggests that Welsh literary expression ym bronn y dyd ("at the breast/bosom of the day") is an archaic formula possibly referring to the Dawn goddess, who bared her breast.

== In non-Indo-European traditions ==
According to Michael Witzel, the Japanese goddess of the dawn Uzume, revered in Shinto, was influenced by Vedic religion. It has been suggested by anthropologist Kevin Tuite that the Georgian goddess Dali also shows several parallels with Indo-European dawn goddesses.

== Bibliography ==
- Beekes, Robert S.P. (2009). Etymological Dictionary of Greek. Brill. ISBN 978-90-04-32186-1.
- Blažek, Václav (2007). Mallory, James P.; Adams, Douglas Q.; The Oxford introduction to Proto-Indo-European and the Proto-Indo-European world (review). Vol. 56. Sborník prací Filozofické fakulty brněnské univerzity. ISBN 978-80-210-4335-0.
- Boedeker, Deborah D. (1974). Aphrodite's Entry into Greek Epic. Brill. ISBN 978-90-04-03946-9.
- Campbell Rhorer, Catherine (1980). "Red and White in Ovid's Metamorphoses: The Mulberry Tree in the tale of Pyramus and Thisbe". Ramus. 9 (2): 79–88. doi:10.1017/S0048671X00040029. ISSN 0048-671X.
- Corbin, Henry (1977). Spiritual Body and Celestial Earth: From Mazdean Iran to Shi'ite Iran [Corps spirituelle et terre céleste, de l'Iran Mazdean à l'Iran shî'ite]. Translated by Pearson, Nancy. Princeton University Press. ISBN 978-0-691-01883-6.
- Coulter, Charles R.; Turner, Patricia (2013). Encyclopedia of Ancient Deities. Routledge. ISBN 978-1-135-96390-3.
- Dedvukaj, Lindon (2023). "Linguistic evidence for the Indo-European and Albanian origin of Aphrodite". Proceedings of the Linguistic Society of America. 8 (1). Linguistic Society of America: 5500. doi:10.3765/plsa.v8i1.5500. S2CID 258381736.
- Derksen, Rick (2015). Etymological Dictionary of the Baltic Inherited Lexicon. Brill. ISBN 9789004155046.
- Derksen, Rick (2008). Etymological Dictionary of the Slavic Inherited Lexicon. Brill. ISBN 9789004155046.
- de Vaan, Michiel (2008). Etymological Dictionary of Latin and the other Italic Languages. Brill. ISBN 9789004167971.
- de Vries, Jan (1962). Altnordisches Etymologisches Worterbuch (1977 ed.). Brill. ISBN 978-90-04-05436-3.
- Dixon-Kennedy, Mike (1998). Encyclopedia of Russian & Slavic Myth and Legend. ABC-CLIO. ISBN 978-1-57607-063-5.
- Falluomini, Carla (2017). "Zum gotischen Fragment aus Bologna II: Berichtigungen und neue Lesungen". Zeitschrift für deutsches Altertum und deutsches Literatur. 146 (3): 284–294. doi:10.3813/zfda-2017-0012. S2CID 217253695.
- Frashëri, Naim (1980). Dhimitër S. Shuteriqi (ed.). Vepra të zgjedhura. Vol. 1. Akademia e Shkencave e RPSSH.
- Greimas, Algirdas J. (1992). Of Gods and Men. Studies in Lithuanian Mythology. Indiana University Press. ISBN 0-253-32652-4.
- Hatto, Arthur T. (1965). Eos: An enquiry into the theme of lovers' meetings and partings at dawn in poetry. Walter de Gruyter. ISBN 978-3-11-170360-2.
- Hyllested, Adam; Joseph, Brian D. (2022). "Albanian". In Olander, Thomas (ed.). The Indo-European Language Family : A Phylogenetic Perspective. Cambridge University Press. pp. 223–245. doi:10.1017/9781108758666. ISBN 9781108758666. S2CID 161016819.
- Jackson, Peter (2002). "Light from Distant Asterisks. Towards a Description of the Indo-European Religious Heritage". Numen. 49 (1): 61–102. doi:10.1163/15685270252772777. ISSN 0029-5973. JSTOR 3270472.
- Jackson, Peter (2006). The Transformations of Helen: Indo-European Myth and the Roots of the Trojan Cycle. J.H. Röll Verlag. ISBN 978-3-89754-260-0.
- Kostallari, Androkli (1981). Fjalor i gjuhës së sotme shqipe (in Albanian). Vol. 1. Tiranë: Rilindja.
- Kroonen, Guus (2013). Etymological Dictionary of Proto-Germanic. Brill. ISBN 9789004183407.
- Lambertz, Maximilian (1922). Albanische Märchen (und andere Texte zur albanischen Volkskunde). Wien: A. Hölder.
- Lambertz, Maximilian (1973). "Die Mythologie der Albaner". In Hans Wilhelm Haussig (ed.). Wörterbuch der Mythologie (in German). Vol. 2. pp. 455–509.
- Lindow, John (2002). Norse Mythology: A Guide to Gods, Heroes, Rituals, and Beliefs. Oxford University Press. p. 65. ISBN 978-0-19-983969-8.
- Mallory, James P.; Adams, Douglas Q. (1997). Encyclopedia of Indo-European Culture. London: Routledge. ISBN 978-1-884964-98-5.
- Mallory, James P.; Adams, Douglas Q. (2006). The Oxford Introduction to Proto-Indo-European and the Proto-Indo-European World. Oxford, UK: Oxford University Press. ISBN 978-0-19-929668-2.
- Martirosyan, Hrach K. (2008). Etymological dictionary of the Armenian inherited lexicon. Brill. ISBN 978-90-04-17337-8.
- Martirosyan, Hrach K. (2014). "An Armenian theonym of Indo-European origin: Ayg 'Dawn Goddess'". Armenian Journal of Near Eastern Studies. 8: 219–224.
- Massetti, Laura (2019). "Antimachus's Enigma on Erytheia, the Latvian Sun-goddess and a Red Fish". The Journal of Indo-European Studies. 47 (1–2).
- Plangarica, Tomor (2001). Montécot, Christiane; Osipov, Vladimir; Vassilaki, Sophie (eds.). "Les noms propres en albanais et quelques-unes de leurs particularités à l'époque actuelle". Cahiers balkaniques. 32. Publications Langues'O: 39–54. ISBN 9782858311286. ISSN 0290-7402.
- Shaw, Philip A. (2011). Pagan Goddesses in the Early Germanic World: Eostre, Hreda and the Cult of Matrons. Bloomsbury Academic. ISBN 978-0-7156-3797-5.
- Simek, Rudolf (1984). Lexikon der germanischen Mythologie. A. Kröner. ISBN 978-3-520-36801-0.
- Thomaj, Jan (2002). Fjalor i shqipes së sotme: me rreth 34.000 fjalë (in Albanian). Botimet Toena. ISBN 9789992716076.
- West, Martin Litchfield (2007). Indo-European Poetry and Myth. Oxford, UK: Oxford University Press. ISBN 978-0-19-928075-9.
