= Polyptych (document) =

Historical document detailing land ownership

In medieval history, the Polyptych (or Polyptyque) was a document detailing the lands that a noble owned. Many also featured names of the peasants that lived there, allowing for historians to track the history of peasant families. Another common feature was the recording of the transport services and payments of money by peasants. The polyptych was developed in the Carolingian period. They are used in the study of manorialism. Examples include the Polyptych of Irminon from the monastery of St-Germain des Pres.

They are not to be confused with the multi-panel polyptych paintings, mostly altarpieces of the Late Middle Ages and Renaissance.

== Sources ==
- Pounds, Norman John Greville (1974). An economic history of medieval Europe. Longman.
- Vauchez, André; Dobson, Richard Barrie; Lapidge, Michael (2000), Encyclopedia of the Middle Ages, Volume 2, Routledge
