= San Martino, Siracusa =

Church in Sicily, Italy

San Martino
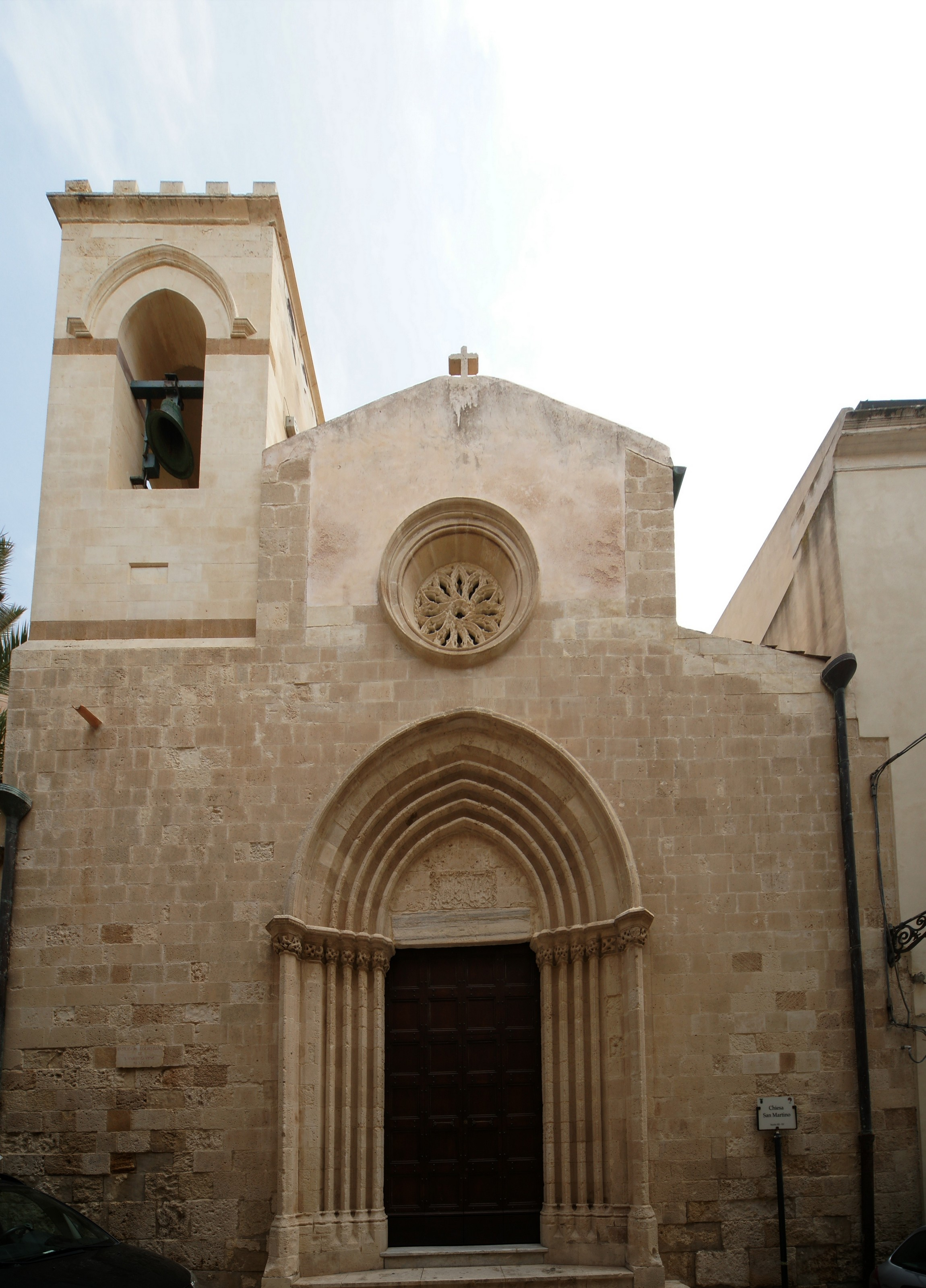
- Facade

Religion
- Affiliation: Catholic Church
- Province: Siracusa

Location
- Location: Siracusa, Italy
- Interactive map of San Martino

Architecture
- Style: Baroque

San Martino is a mainly gothic and baroque-style, Roman Catholic church located on Via San Martino in the island of Ortigia, in the historic city center of Siracusa in Sicily, Italy.

== Description ==
The church is dedicated to St Martin, bishop of Tours. A church or chapel at the site stood apparently since the 6th century, and thus is one of the earliest churches in Sicily. It has been extensively rebuilt since then. There is little documentation about these endeavors. The apse appears to have traces of the earliest church. The gothic ogival portal however appears to date to the 1330s, when Sicily was under Aragonese rule. It is unclear what the weathered label above the door states.

However, it is speculated that the 1693 earthquake toppled the roof and the upper part of the facade, destroying the original rose window. Using a trace remnant of that window, and using a window at the nearby church of San Giovanni Evangelista, a new rose window was installed in 1915.

Inside there is a polyptych painted by an unknown 16th century painter, named the Master of San Martino after this painting, depicting a Virgin and Child with Saints Marziano and Lucy and a Crucifixion and Annunciation. There are lateral altars inside dedicated to St Amatore, St Helen, St Constantine, St Aloe, and one dedicated to all Saints. Under the main altar are relics of St Vincent Martyr, obtained from the catacombs of San Callisto in Rome.
