= Vigoroso da Siena =

Italian painter

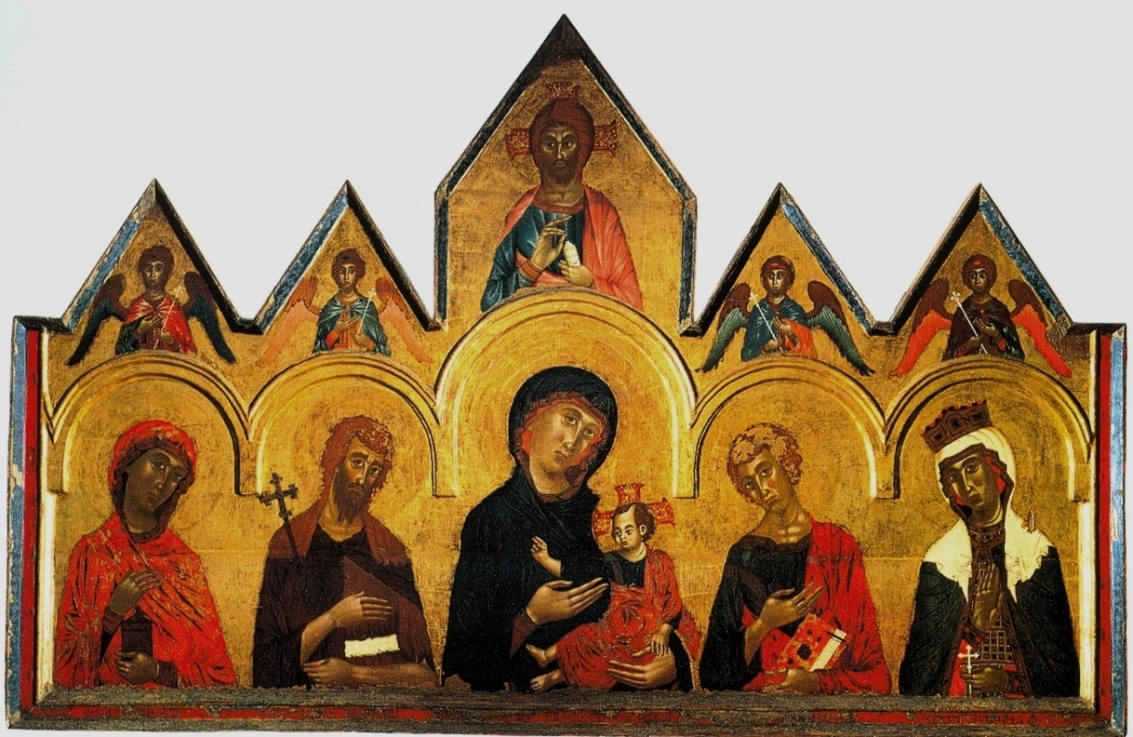
Da Siena's altarpiece from 1291, an example of an early painted panel altarpiece, with the individual parts framed by gables and sculptured elements.

Vigoroso da Siena was an Italian painter, known to be active 1270–1280. He was naturalized to Siena, Tuscany. A contemporary of Cimabue, his only documented work is a polyptych at the Galleria Nazionale of Perugia dated 1291.
