= Bologna Polyptych =

14th-century polyptych attributed to Giotto, now in Bologna

- Polittico di Bologna (Italian)
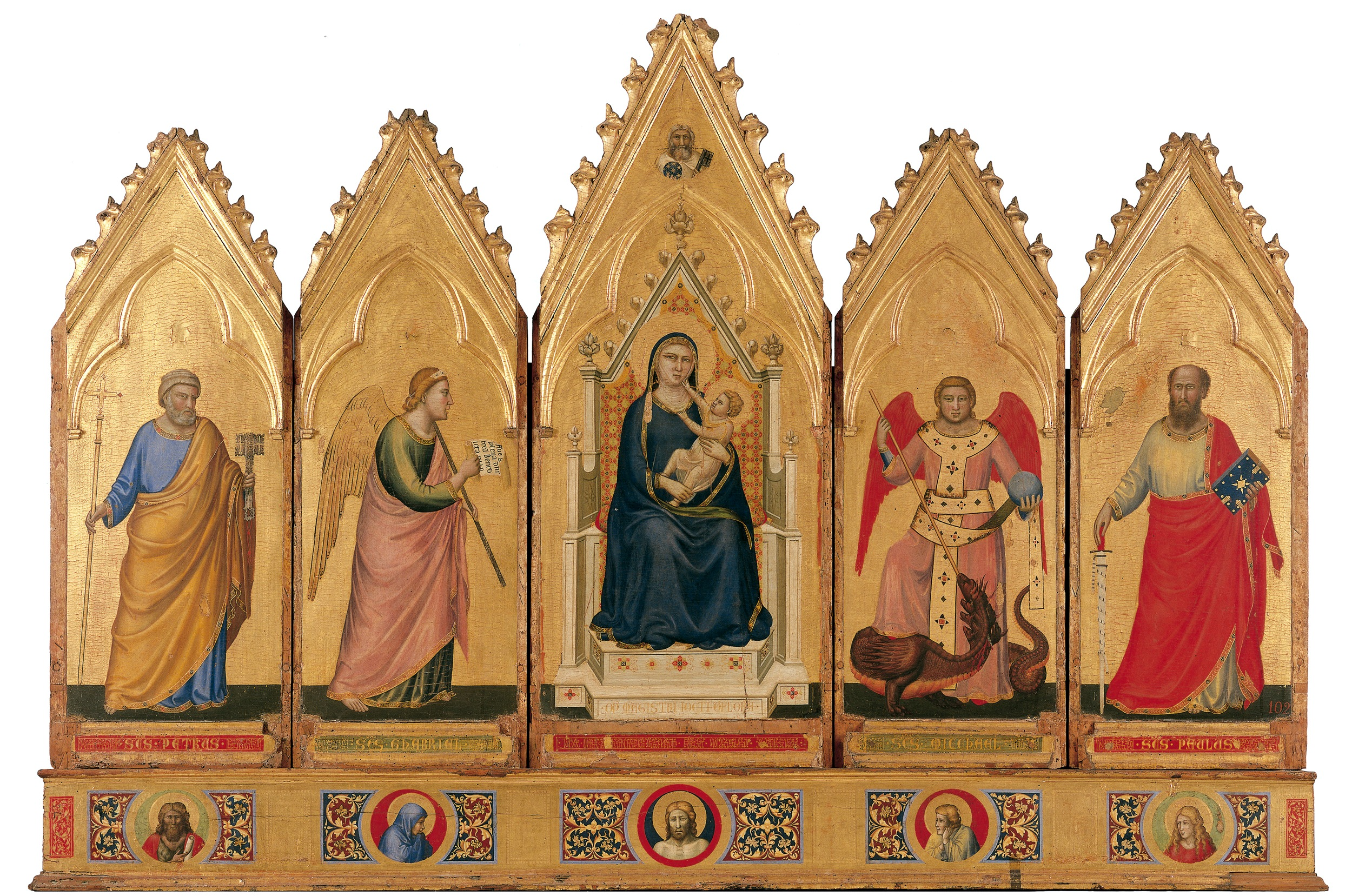
- Artist: Attributed to Giotto (with workshop participation)
- Year: c. 1330 - 1334 (often dated 1333 - 1334)
- Medium: Tempera on panel
- Dimensions: 218 cm × 147.5 cm (86 in × 58.1 in)
- Location: Pinacoteca Nazionale di Bologna, Bologna

The Bologna Polyptych (Italian: Polittico di Bologna) is a polyptych altarpiece in tempera on panel with gold backgrounds, attributed to Giotto with workshop participation and generally dated to the early 1330s. It is preserved in the Pinacoteca Nazionale di Bologna.

== Inscription ==
An inscription is visible on the step of the Virgin’s throne. In modern summaries it is transcribed as opus magistri jocti de florentia.

== Provenance and historical context ==
According to modern summaries, the polyptych was transferred in 1782 from the church of Santa Maria degli Angeli to a chapel of the Collegio Montalto in Bologna. It was disassembled during the Napoleonic period in 1808 and reassembled in 1894 in a new frame, a process that caused damage to some original panels.

Modern accounts describe the work as probably commissioned by the papal legate Bertrand du Pouget for the papal complex at Porta Galliera in Bologna, then part of the Papal States.

== Description ==
The central panel depicts the Virgin enthroned with the Child. The side panels depict four standing saints, identified in modern descriptions as Saint Peter, the Archangel Gabriel, the Archangel Michael, and Saint Paul, arranged symmetrically on either side of the central figure.

A predella is associated with the polyptych. Modern descriptions report that it depicts figures connected with the Passion of Christ and its witnesses.

== Dating and attribution ==
The Fondazione Federico Zeri online catalogue dates the polyptych to 1333 - 1334 and records both an attribution to Giotto and an attribution to Giotto “and helpers” (aiuti).

Modern summaries note that the polyptych is considered largely a workshop product, despite the presence of the inscription naming Giotto.

== See also ==
- Giotto
- Pinacoteca Nazionale di Bologna
- Polyptych
- Altarpiece
