= Aous (disambiguation) =

Vjosa or Aous is a river in Albania and Greece.

Aoos, or Aous may refer to ancient peoples or locations:

- Aous (King) was the first king of ancient Cyprus
- Aous (Cyprus), a river in ancient Cyprus
- Aous (mountain), a mountain in ancient Cyprus
- Aous or Aoos is an epithet or name of Adonis in ancient Cyprus
