= Ausma (given name) =

- Gender: Female
- Name day: June 26

Origin
- Meaning: Dawn
- Region of origin: Latvia

Other names
- Related names: Austra

Ausma is a Latvian given name, borne by over 4000 individuals in Latvia. Its name day is June 26.

== Notable people named Ausma ==
- Ausma Derkēvica (1929–2011), Latvian choir conductor
- Ausma Kantāne-Ziedone (born 1941), Latvian actress and politician
- Ausma Zehanat Khan, Canadian novelist
