= Benjamin Guérard =

French librarian and historian (1797–1854)

- Born: Benjamin Edme-Charles; 15 March 1797; Montbard
- Died: 10 March 1854 (aged 56); Paris
- Occupations: Historian; Librarian

Benjamin Guérard (15 March 1797 – 10 March 1854) was a 19th-century French librarian and historian, especially known for his edition of cartularies of abbeys of the Carolingian period.

== Biography ==
Born in a family of Burgundian bourgeoisie, Guérard studied in Dijon from 1807 to 1814, then moved to Paris where he was first a bank employee.

In 1818, he obtained a supernumerary place at the manuscript department of the Bibliothèque royale and decided to improve his training by following the course of the École royale des chartes established in 1821.

Became permanent employee of the Royal Library, he devoted himself to historical research, getting a mention from the Académie française for his Discours sur la vie et les ouvrages du président Jacques-Auguste de Thou and collaborated to the L'Art de vérifier les dates. But he is mostly known for his Essai sur les divisions territoriales de la Gaule sous les rois des Francs, crowned by the Académie des Inscriptions et Belles-Lettres (1830) and printed at government expense in 1832.

In 1831, he was appointed at the chair of diplomatics of the École des chartes and in 1833, was elected a member of the Académie des Inscriptions et Belles-Lettres, in the seat of his master Abel Remusat, while being assistant curator at the manuscript department of the Royal Library.

A founding member of the Société de l'histoire de France and member of the publishing committee of the Documents inédits relatifs à l'histoire de France, he devoted himself to publishing many ancient documents, particularly the abbey cartularies. The best known is probably the Polyptych of Irminon.

After the reorganization of the École des chartes in 1846, his courses became more important and in 1848, Benjamin Guérard was appointed director of the school.

At the end of 1852, he becomes curator of the manuscript department of the Bibliothèque impériale, but not for long since he died a year and a half later.

== Selected publications ==
- Discours sur la vie et les ouvrages du président Jacques-Auguste de Thou
- L'Art de vérifier les dates
- Essai sur les divisions territoriales de la Gaule sous les rois des Francs
- Condition des personnes et des terres : le moyen âge et la renaissance. Archived from the original on 11 October 2016.

Editions of ancient documents

- Le Polyptyque d'Irminon

Preceded by Jean-Antoine Letronne	Director of the École Nationale des Chartes; 1848–1854	Succeeded by Natalis de Wailly
