= Ausma Derkēvica =

Latvian choral conductor and music teacher

- Born: 21 July 1929
- Died: 26 December 2011 (aged 82)
- Occupations: Choral conductor, music teacher.

Ausma Derkēvica (21 July 1929 – 26 December 2011) was a Latvian choral conductor and music teacher. She is an honored professor at the Jāzeps Vītols Latvian Academy of Music.

== Biography ==
In 1959, Ausma Derkēvica graduated the Jāzeps Vītols Latvian Academy of Music, class of T. Kalniņš. From 1958 until 1970, she was the choral conductor of the Latvian SSR Revolution Veteran choir. From 1958 until 1989, she led the folk choir Dzintars together with her consort Imants Cepītis, afterwards until 2000, Ms Derkēvica was the choir's principal leader. Under her conduct, Dzintars was the first Latvian choir to win an international competition and in 1968 they received a "Grand Prix" in the competition in Debrecen. Dzintars has received many international prizes not only in the women choirs' group, but also in other choirs competitions.

Ausma Derkēvica can be characterized as a starter and developer of a new movement of women's choirs in Latvia.

She also was the choral conductor of the National Academic Choir (1969–1989).

From 1964 until 1972, she worked as a teacher at the Emīls Dārziņš secondary music school. From 1959 to 1964, A. Derkēvica led the musical sector of the Folk Art house. She has been the main conductor of many Latvian Song and Dance Festivals since 1973.

In 1995, A. Derkēvica was awarded the third class Order of the Three Stars, in 1980—a prize from the Latvian SSR. In 1999, she received a lifetime pension from the Latvian Culture Capital Foundation.
