= Polyptych =

Painting divided into multiple panels

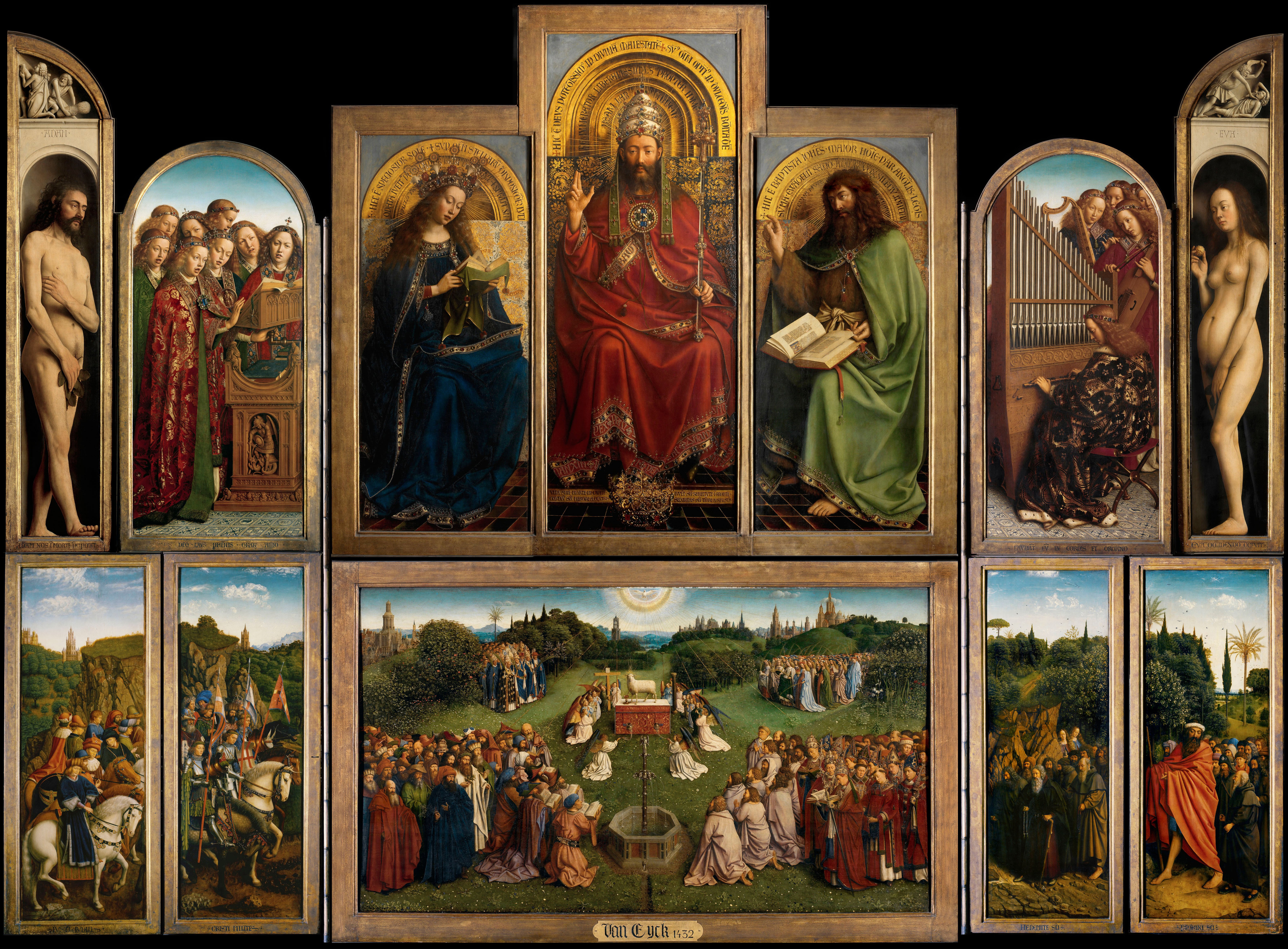
Open (top) and closed (bottom) views of the Ghent Altarpiece, 1432

A polyptych (/ˈpɒlɪptɪk/ POL-ip-tik; Greek: poly- "many" and ptychē "fold") is a work of art (usually a panel painting) which is divided into sections, or panels. Some definitions restrict "polyptych" to works with more than three sections: a diptych is a two-part work of art; a triptych is a three-part work; a tetraptych or quadriptych has four parts; a pentaptych has five parts. The great majority of historical examples are paintings with religious subjects, but in the 20th century the format became popular again for portraits and other subjects, in painting, photography, and other media.

Historically, polyptychs were panel paintings that typically displayed one "central" or "main" panel that was usually the largest; the other panels are called "side" panels, or if hinged, "wings". Folding forms were much more common north of the Alps. Sometimes, as evident in the Ghent Altarpiece and Isenheim Altarpiece, the hinged panels can be varied in arrangement to show different "views" or "openings" in the piece, because the wing panels are painted with images on both sides. The wings were usually kept folded shut, showing the "closed" view, except on Sundays or feast-days, or if visitors paid the sacristan for a sight of the "open" view. The upper panels often depict static scenes, while the lower register, the predella, often depict small narrative scenes.

Polyptych with Coronation of the Virgin and Saints by Cenni di Francesco, 1390s

Large polyptychs were most commonly created as altarpieces in churches and cathedrals, although smaller diptychs and triptychs could be personal works for the rich, for example the royal Wilton Diptych, a very personal work made for Richard II of England. They had the advantage that they could be folded up to make them more secure from damage during travel. Another form was the carved ivory polyptych, most often religious, but with some secular subjects (these were more common on ivory boxes or mirrors).

When the altarpieces later came out of use, for a variety of reasons, they were often broken up and individual panels dispersed into the art trade, to be treated as easel paintings. Panels with paintings on both sides were often carefully sawn apart, to give two one-sided panels. Finding and reconstructing the parts of dispersed polyptychs has been the subject of much research in art history since the 19th century.

In medieval history, a different sense of the word is the polyptych meaning a document detailing the lands that a noble owned. Many also featured names of the peasants that lived there, allowing for historians to track the history of peasant families. The 9th-century monastic Polyptych of Irminon is an example.

== History and development ==
Whilst the polyptych originated as a form of sacred art, as a term to describe art in general, it can be seen to encompass any work of art constituted by multiple pieces of art such as sculpture, photography, or video and text-based art forms.

In European Renaissance painting, a polyptych is often seen in a devotional setting, often found as altarpieces. Whilst the precise origins of polyptychal art is uncertain, the earliest examples have been described as coming from Italy in the early 14th century. The development of Church art in the 13th century saw a fusing of the Byzantine iconostasis with the Gothic architectural style. These twin influences resulted in something resembling the Renaissance polyptych that is recognisable today. The work of Duccio di Buoninsegna, who was active in Siena in the early-to-mid 14th century offers early examples of the polyptych form, with the early Italo-Byzantine influences.

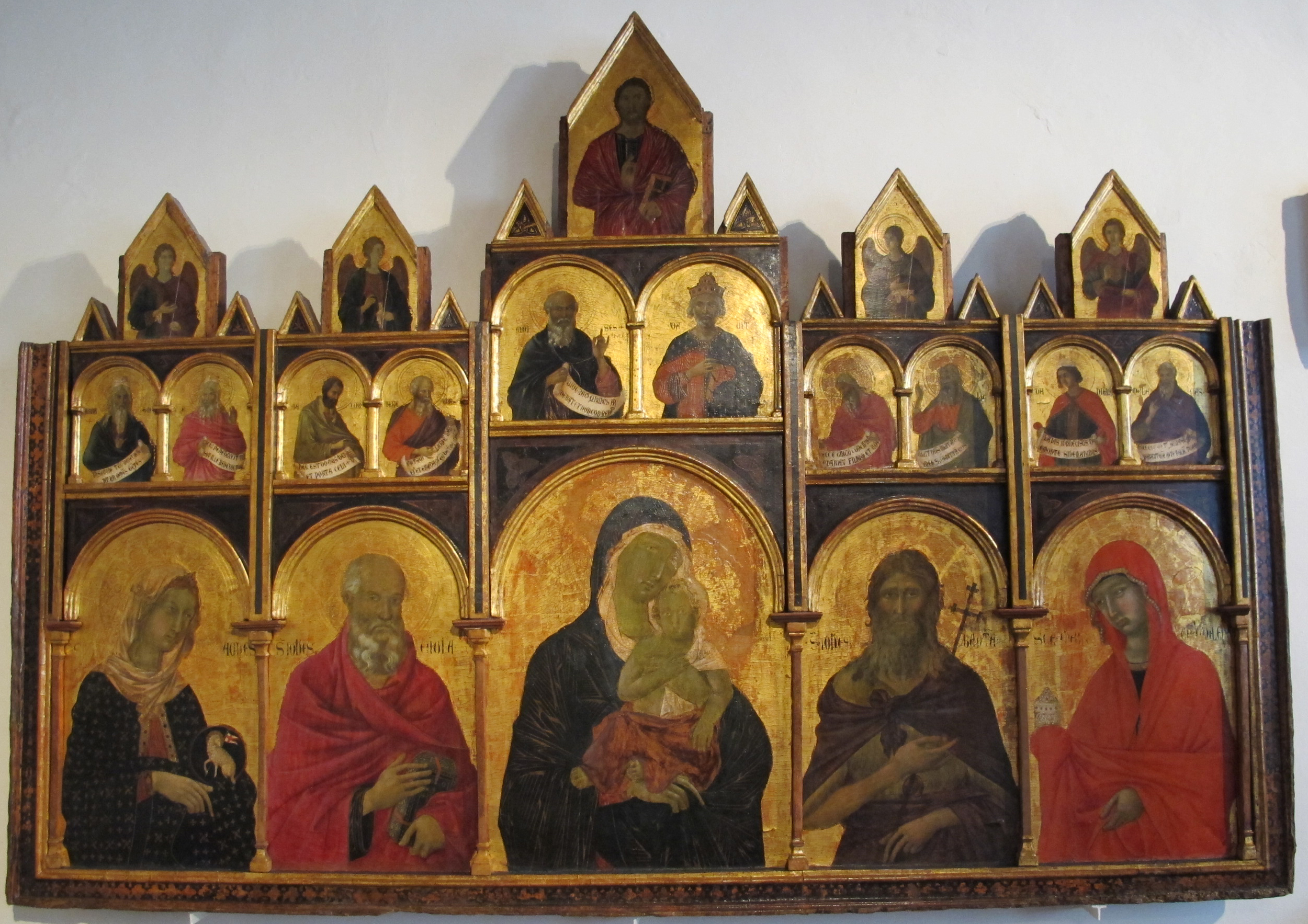
Duccio di Buoninsegna, Polyptych no. 47, 1315–1319, tempera and gold on wood, from the now lost church of the Hospital of Santa Maria della Scala in Siena, Siena, Pinacoteca Nazionale

By the Renaissance, both large altarpiece polyptychs and smaller domestic ones were falling out of fashion, partly because artists preferred to paint single scenes with a unified background, but Rubens still painted some very large winged altarpieces in the early 17th century, such as his Descent from the Cross triptych, of 1612–1614, in Antwerp Cathedral, which also has his Raising of the Cross and Resurrection triptychs, of similar date. By this time this format was unusual.

Sean Scully describes a number of his paintings as triptychs, such as the paintings "Demo Logic Red" and "To Be With".

== Examples ==
- The Stefaneschi Polyptych, c. 1320, by Giotto.
- Bologna Polyptych, c. 1330–1334, attributed to Giotto (Pinacoteca Nazionale di Bologna).
- The Ghent Altarpiece, completed in 1432 by Hubert van Eyck and Jan van Eyck.
- The Last Judgement (Lochner) 1435 by Stefan Lochner.
- Polyptych of the Misericordia (1445–1462) by Piero della Francesca.
- Saint Augustine Altarpiece (Piero della Francesca), very dispersed
- Beaune Altarpiece (1450) by Rogier van der Weyden.
- Saint Augustine Polyptych (1470) by Perugino.
- The Saint Vincent Panels (1470–1480) by Nuno Gonçalves.
- The Monte San Martino Altarpiece (1471 ca.), by Carlo Crivelli.
- St. Dominic Polyptych (1506–1508) by Lorenzo Lotto.
- The Isenheim Altarpiece (1512–1516) by Matthias Grünewald.
- Poema de Córdoba (1913-1915) by Julio Romero de Torres

== See also ==
- Polyptych (document)
