= Austra (given name) =

Latvian and Lithuanian feminine given name

- Gender: Female
- Name day: March 5

Origin
- Origin: From austra ('dawn')
- Region of origin: Latvia, Lithuania

Other names
- Related names: Ausma, Austris

Austra is a Latvian and Lithuanian feminine given name. The associated name day is March 5.

== Notable people named Austra ==
- Austra Skujiņa (1909–1932), Latvian poet
- Austra Skujytė (born 1979), Lithuanian athlete
