= Aoös (mythology) =

Another name for Adonis

Aoös (Greek Αώος, pronounced aO-os) was another name for god Adonis and also the mythic son of Eos and Cephalus who became the first king of Cyprus. Aoös' name was given to a river and a mountain (Aoön) of Cyprus. According to mythology his brother was Paphos, the founder of the Cypriot city with the same name.

In modern Greek, it is the name of a river (see Aoos, called Vjosa in its Albanian part).
