= Altarpiece =

Religious artwork behind an altar

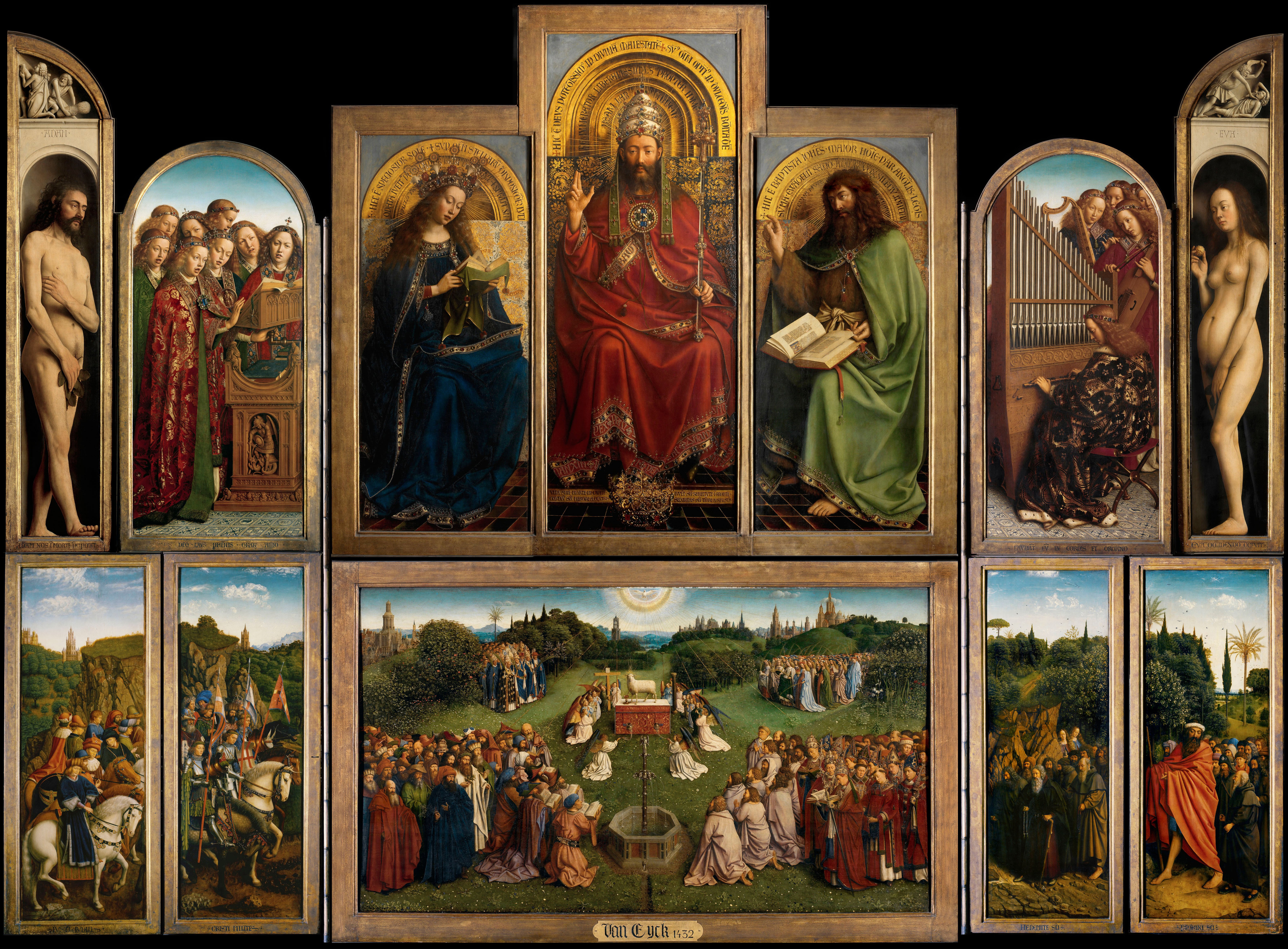
The Ghent Altarpiece (1432) by Hubert and Jan van Eyck, with its wings open. Considered one of the masterpieces of Early Netherlandish painting, a complex polyptych panel winged altarpiece, which lost its elaborate framework in the Reformation.

An altarpiece is a painting or sculpture, including relief, of religious subject matter made for placing at the back of or behind the altar of a Christian church. Though most commonly used for a single work of art such as a painting or sculpture, or a set of them, the word can also be used of the whole ensemble behind an altar, otherwise known as a reredos, including what is often an elaborate frame for the central image or images. Altarpieces were one of the most important products of Christian art especially from the late Middle Ages to the era of Baroque painting.

The word altarpiece, used for paintings, usually means a framed work of panel painting on wood, or later on canvas. In the Middle Ages they were generally the largest genre for these formats. Murals in fresco tend to cover larger surfaces. The largest painted altarpieces developed complicated structures, especially winged altarpieces with hinged side wings that folded in to cover the main image, and were painted on the reverse with different simpler images. Often this was the normal view shown in the church, except for Sundays and feast days, when the wings were opened to display the main image. At other times visitors could usually see this by paying the sacristan.

Altarpieces with many small framed panels are called polyptychs; triptychs have a main panel, and two side ones. Diptychs, with only two equally sized panels, were usually smaller portable pieces for individuals. The predella is a row of much smaller scenes running below the main panel; often these showed narrative scenes related to the subject of the main image. They were only properly visible from close up, but the extra height allowed the main panels above to be clearly seen by the congregation, and any shutters to be opened and closed with less disturbance to other items on the altar.

Many altarpieces have now been removed from their church settings, and often from their elaborate sculpted frameworks, and are displayed as more simply framed paintings in museums and elsewhere.

== History ==
=== Origins and early development ===
In the first several centuries of large Christian churches being built, the altar tended to be further forward (towards the congregation) in the sanctuary than in the later Middles Ages (a position to which it returned in the 20th century) and a large altarpiece would often have blocked the view of a bishop's throne and other celebrants, so decoration was concentrated on other places, with antependiums or altar frontals, or the surrounding walls.

Altarpieces seem to have begun to be used during the 11th century, with the possible exception of a few earlier examples. The reasons and forces that led to the development of altarpieces are not generally agreed upon. The habit of placing decorated reliquaries of saints on or behind the altar, as well as the tradition of decorating the front of the altar with sculptures or textiles, preceded the first altarpieces. In the Romanesque period, painted altar frontals on panel seem to have been a common alternative location for paintings. Few survive, though small Catalonian churches preserved several, many now in the Museu Nacional d'Art de Catalunya in Barcelona. The development of altarpieces may have begun at the altars of side chapels, typically engaged with the wall behind, rather than at freestanding main altars.

Many early altarpieces were relatively simple compositions in the form of a rectangular panel decorated with series of saints in rows, with a central, more pronounced figure such as a depiction of Mary or Christ. An elaborate example of such an early altarpiece is the metal and enamel Pala d'Oro in Venice, extended in the 12th century from an earlier altar frontal. The appearance and development of these first altarpieces marked an important turning point both in the history of Christian art as well as Christian religious practice. It was considered a "significant development" because of its impact on the "nature and function of the Christian image...the autonomous image now assumed a legitimate position at the centre of Christian worship".

=== The emergence of panel painting ===
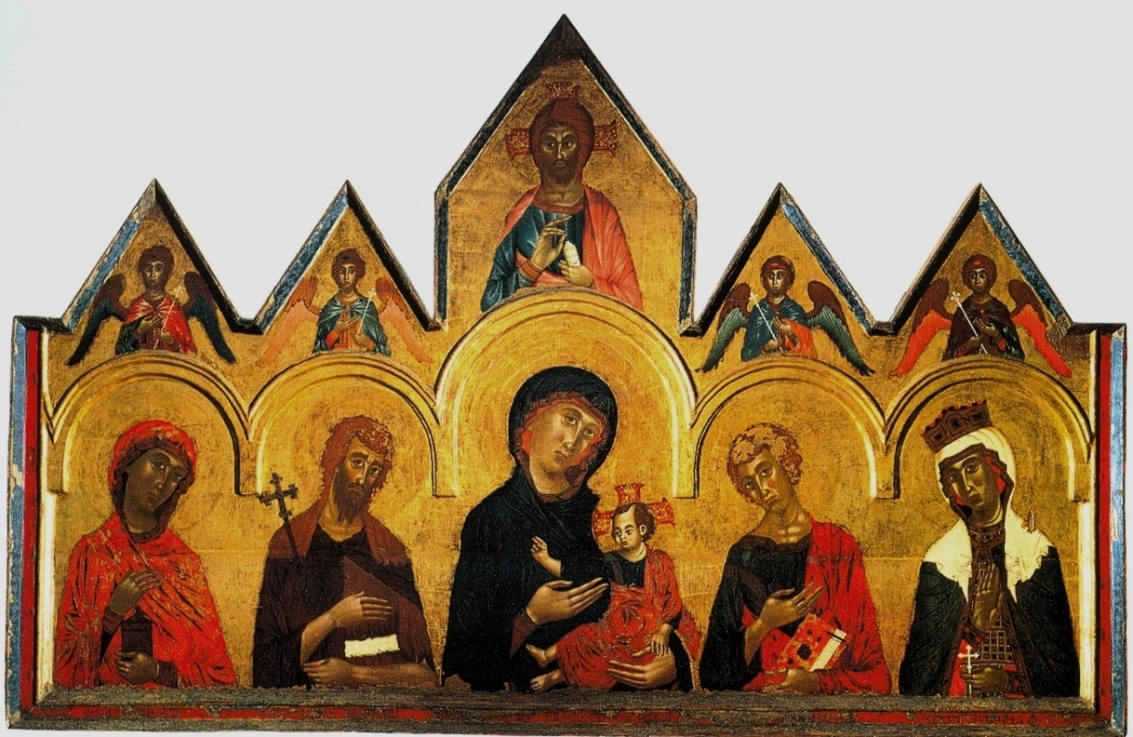
Vigoroso da Siena's altarpiece from 1291, an example of an early painted panel altarpiece, with the individual parts framed by gables and sculptured elements

Painted panel altars emerged in Italy during the 13th century, and until the Renaissance were generally the largest and most significant type of panel painting. In the 13th century, it was not uncommon to find frescoed or mural altarpieces in Italy; mural paintings behind the altar served as visual complements for the liturgy. These altarpieces were influenced by Byzantine art, notably icons, which reached Western Europe in greater numbers following the conquest of Constantinople in 1204. During this time, altarpieces occasionally began to be decorated with an outer, sculptured or gabled structure with the purpose of providing a frame for individual parts of the altarpiece. Vigoroso da Siena's altarpiece from 1291 (pictured) is an example. This treatment of the altarpiece would eventually pave the way for the emergence, in the 14th century, of the polyptych.

The sculpted elements in the emerging polyptychs often took inspiration from contemporary Gothic architecture. In Italy, they were still typically executed in wood and painted, while in northern Europe altarpieces were often made of stone.

In the early 14th century, the winged altarpiece emerged in Germany, the Low Countries, Scandinavia, the Baltic region and the Catholic parts of Eastern Europe. They spread to France, but remained rare in Italy. By hinging the outer panels to the central panel and painting them on both sides, the subject could be regulated by opening or closing the wings. The pictures could thus be changed depending on liturgical demands. The earliest often displayed sculptures on the inner panels (i.e., displayed when open) and paintings on the back of the wings (displayed when closed). With the advent of winged altarpieces, a shift in imagery also occurred. Instead of being centred on a single holy figure, altarpieces began to portray more complex narratives linked to the concept of salvation.

=== Late Middle Ages ===
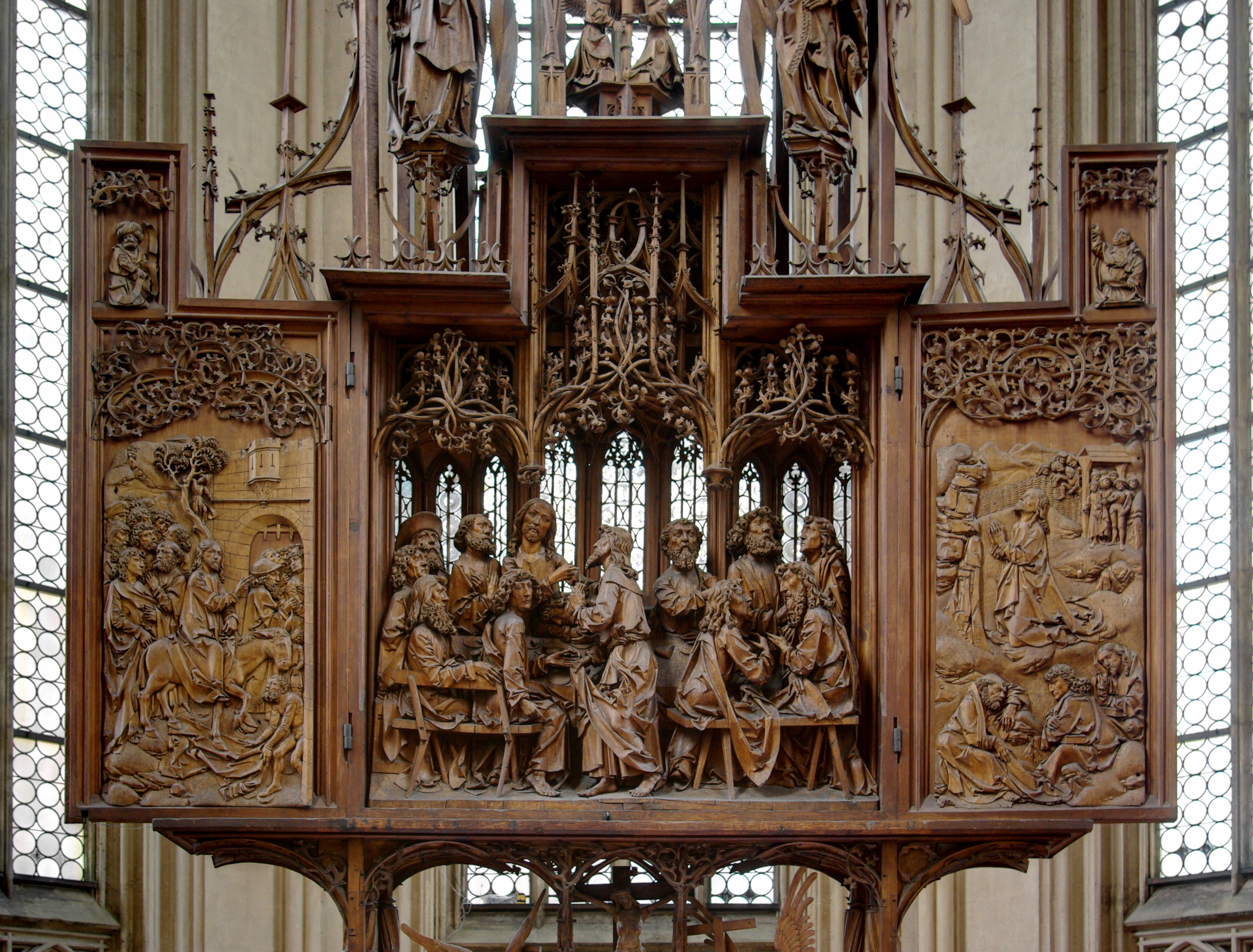
Rothenburg: The Altarpiece of the Holy Blood, by Tilman Riemenschneider (1501–1505). An example of an altarpiece with a central, sculpted section and relief wings.

As the Middle Ages progressed, altarpieces began to be commissioned more frequently. In Northern Europe, initially Lübeck and later Antwerp would develop into veritable export centres for the production of altarpieces, exporting to Scandinavia, Spain and northern France. By the 15th century, altarpieces were often commissioned not only by churches but also by individuals, families, guilds and confraternities. The 15th century saw the birth of Early Netherlandish painting in the Low Countries; henceforth panel painting would dominate altarpiece production in the area. In Germany, sculpted wooden altarpieces were instead often preferred, for example the Veit Stoss altarpiece in Kraków (completed 1489), while in England there was a 15th-century industry producing relatively cheap painted altarpiece kits in Nottingham alabaster, many of which were exported, the frame being added at the destination.

In England, as well as in France, stone retables enjoyed general popularity. In Italy both stone retables and wooden polyptychs were common, with individual painted panels and often (notably in Venice and Bologna) with complex framing in the form of architectural compositions. In Spain, altarpieces developed in a highly original fashion into often very large, architecturally influenced reredos, sometimes as tall as the church in which it was housed.

=== Renaissance and Reformation ===
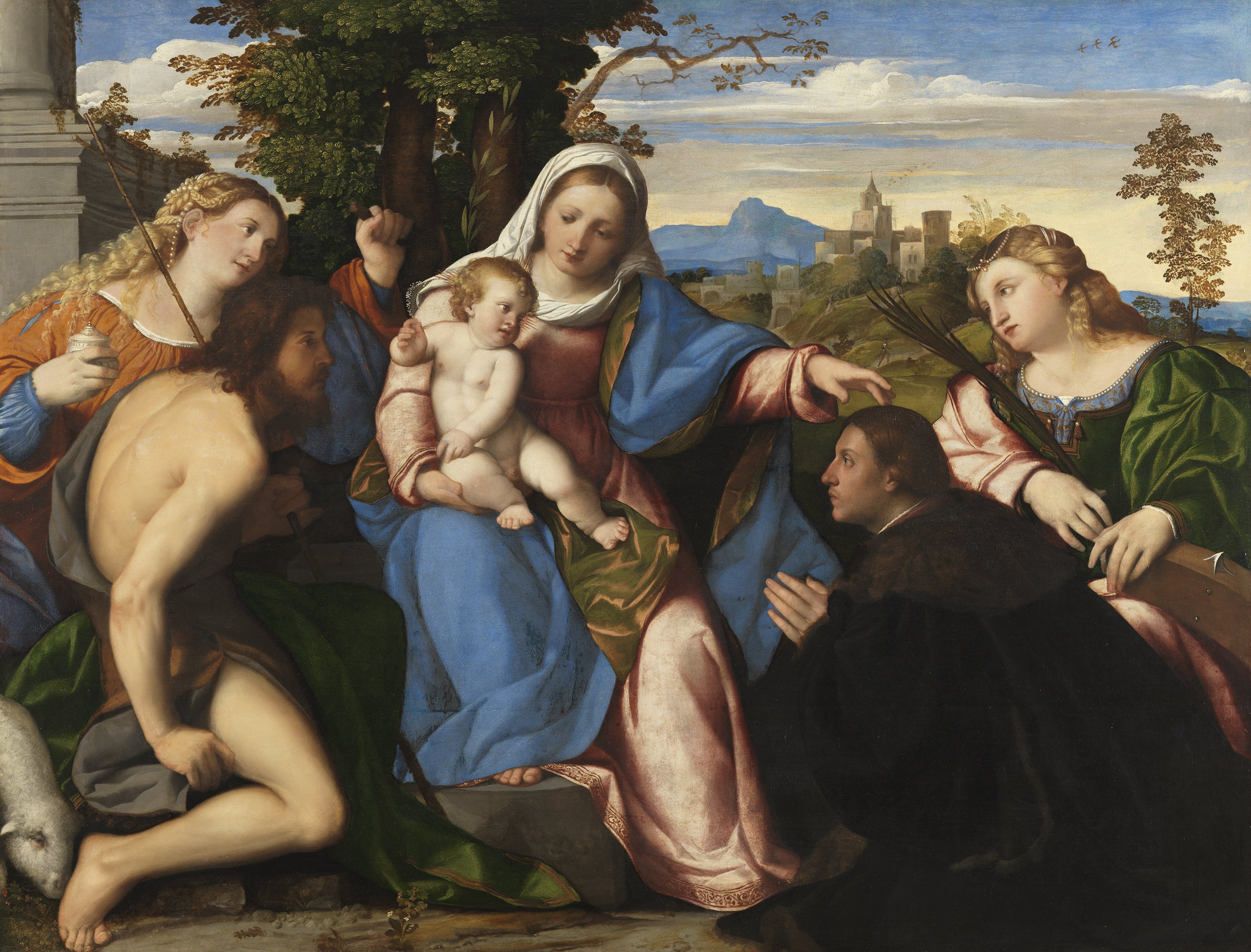
Sacra conversazione with a landscape setting and donor portrait, Palma Vecchio, c. 1519

The 15th century also saw a development of the composition of Italian altarpieces where the polyptych was gradually abandoned in favour of single-panel, painted altarpieces. In Italy, the sacra conversazione developed, a group usually centred on the Virgin and Child, flanked by a group of saints usually chosen to represent the patron saints of the church, city, religious order or donors. These became increasingly informal in pose, and some may have been initially displayed in the donor's house, then bequeathed to a church as a memorial. They represented the same components as many altarpieces with framed compartments, but with a single pictorial space.

Other types of Italian composition also moved towards having a single large scene, sometimes called a pala (Italian for "panel"), often dispensing with the predella. Rather than static figures, narrative scenes from the lives of the main figures grew in popularity; this was to become the dominant style for large altarpieces over the next centuries. Originally mostly horizontal ("landscape") in format, they increasingly used vertical ("portrait") formats. Some were as much as 4 metres tall, and concentrated on a single dramatic action. This much height typically required a composition with an in aria group to fill the upper part of the picture space, as in Raphael's Transfiguration (now Vatican), though The Raising of Lazarus by Sebastiano del Piombo (now London) is almost as tall, using only a landscape at the top.

In Italy, during the Renaissance, free-standing groups of sculpture also began to feature as altarpieces. The most famous example is the Pietà by Michelangelo, originally placed as the altarpiece in a side chapel of Old St Peter's.

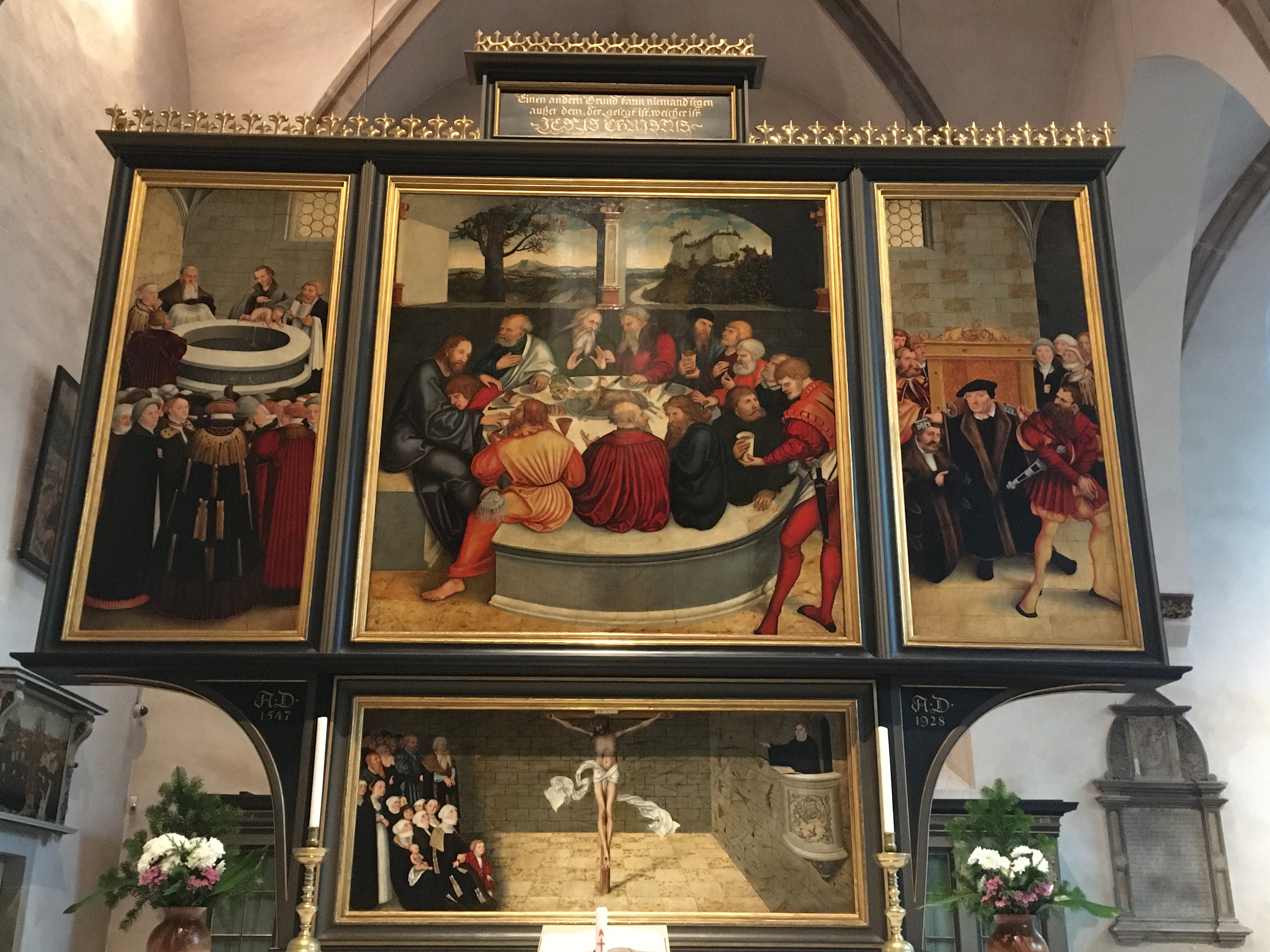
Lucas Cranach the Elder's Lutheran Wittenberg Altarpiece, 1547

The Protestant Reformation under Martin Luther initially persisted with the creation of new some altarpieces reflecting the doctrines of the Lutheran Church, sometimes using portraits of Lutheran leaders in their statuary. Lutheran altarpieces, including those of the Last Supper, were commissioned under his purview. The Schneeberg Altarpiece was placed at the high altar of St. Wolfgang im Salzkammergut and as Lutheran sacred art, reflected "the devotional forms of fifteenth- and early sixteenth century northern art". The Schneeberg Altarpiece (1539), along with the Wittenberg Altarpiece (1547) and the Weimar Altarpiece (1555), were Christocentric in their iconography and "these altarpieces reinforced the key teachings of the new church and helped consolidate a sense of confessional identity." Within eastern Germany alone, Lutheran patrons erected thirty new altarpieces. Most pre-Reformation altarpieces were preserved within Lutheran churches as the "altar was still believed to be a particularly holy place, and should be adorned accordingly."

In contrast, Reformed Christianity (Calvinism) opposed all large public religious images such as altarpieces, and by about 1560 production of Reformed Protestant ones had mostly ceased. Outbursts of iconoclasm locally led to the destruction of many altarpieces. As an example, during the burning of the Antwerp Cathedral in the course of the Calvinist Reformation in 1533, more than fifty altarpieces were destroyed. If anything, the Calvinist destruction stimulated the creation of more and larger altarpieces in Catholic Europe. Titian produced a number of ones with very large single scenes, mostly now on canvas. Among the most influential were his Assumption in the Frari Church (1518, still on panel, 690 cm × 360 cm (270 in × 140 in)), the Pesaro Madonna in the same church (1526, now on canvas), Killing of Saint Peter Martyr (1529, now lost but known from prints and copies).

The Reformation, both Lutheran and Reformed, regarded the Word of God – that is, the gospel – as central to Christendom, and Protestant altarpieces were often painted biblical text passages. With time, Protestant thought gave birth to the pulpit altar (Kanzelaltar in German), in which the altarpiece and the pulpit were combined, making the altarpiece a literal abode for the Word of God.

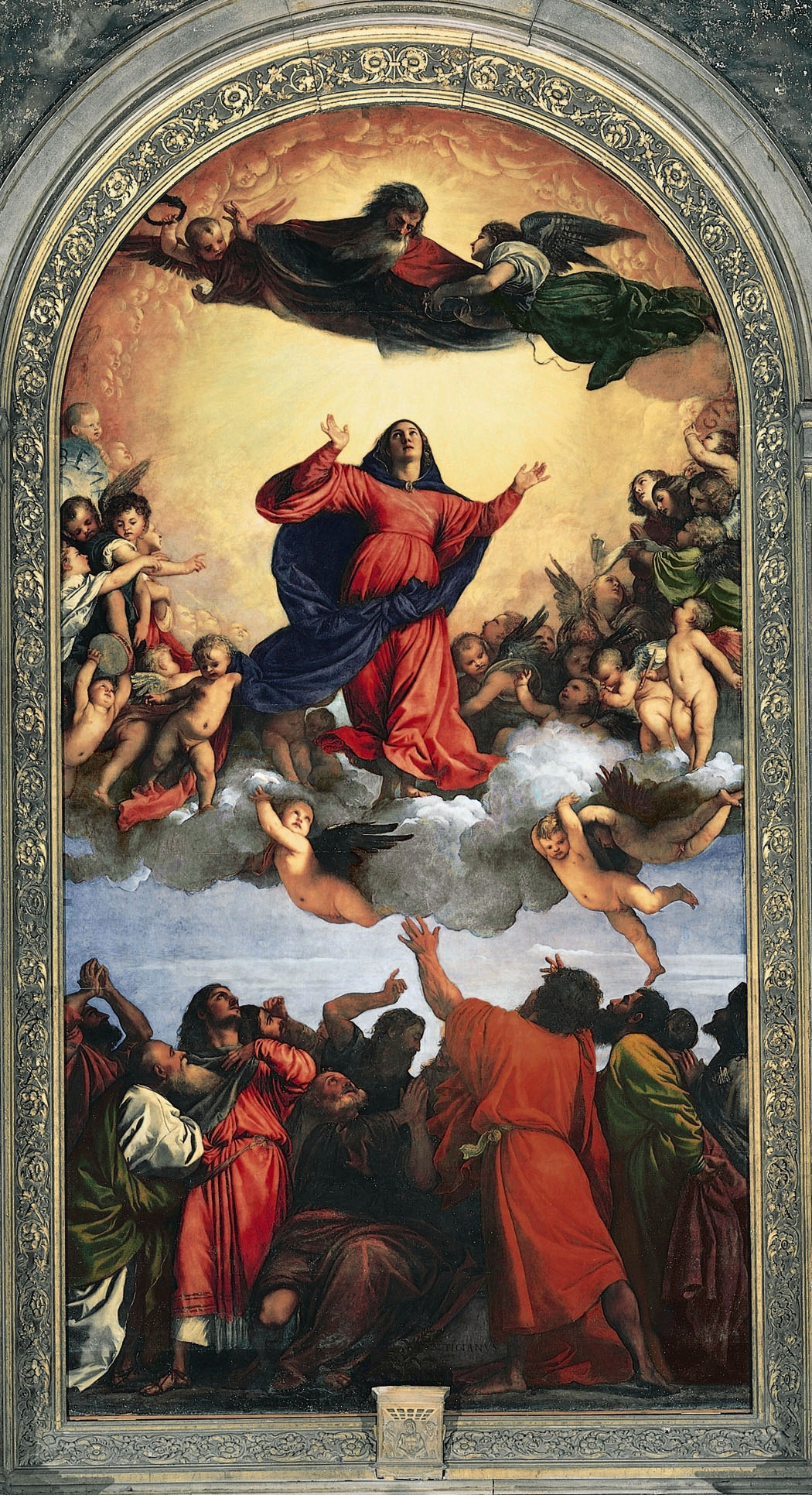
Titian, Assumption in the Frari Church, 1518, panel, 690 cm × 360 cm (270 in × 140 in)

=== Baroque ===
In the Baroque period, the single scene became standard, sometimes incorporated in an elaborate carved frame. Usually there was no reverse view, as altarpieces were fixed to a wall in side chapels, or a built-up backing for main altars in older churches where there were other chapels behind the main altar. Predellas and closing side panels became rare, though Rubens's Elevation of the Cross (1611) has two hinged side-wings, with saints on their other sides, a rather conservative format, in a medieval church.

Increasingly, the size and shape of altarpieces became dictated by the overall design and decoration of the church, which the artist was required to fit in with. If funds allowed several altarpieces were commissioned for Baroque churches when they were first built or re-fitted, for the main and side-altars, giving the whole interior a consistent style. Medieval churches had mostly acquired altarpieces gradually over time, from different donors.

Sculptural altarpieces, or designs integrating painting with sculpture, became more common. Examples by Gian Lorenzo Bernini (1598–1680), the leading Baroque sculptor of his day, include his Ecstasy of Saint Teresa in Santa Maria della Vittoria, Rome, and his sculpted concetto around the painting by Guillaume Courtois in Sant'Andrea al Quirinale. Both of these were essentially figures in the round, but Alessandro Algardi's Pope Leo the Great repelling Attila in St Peter's Basilica is a "huge" relief with a full scene with over life-size figures. German Baroque and Rococo altarpieces also revived the local taste for sculpture, with the figures in many examples (usually in stucco) spreading around the whole upper level of the church.

=== Later developments ===
While many altarpieces remain today, the majority have been lost. In 1520, there were 2,000 winged altarpieces in the Austrian state of Tyrol alone; scholars estimate that before World War II, there were around 3,000 altarpieces in the entire territory of Nazi Germany. Many were lost during the Reformation (in the north of Europe) or replaced with Baroque altarpieces during the Counter-Reformation (in the southern part of Europe), or else were discarded during the Enlightenment or replaced with Neo-Gothic altarpieces during the 19th century (particularly in the United Kingdom). In the German-speaking part of Europe, there is only one altarpiece remaining that was made for the high altar of a cathedral (in Chur Cathedral in Switzerland). In the 18th century, altarpieces like Piero della Francesca's Saint Augustine Altarpiece were often disassembled and seen as independent artworks. The different panels of the polyptych of St Augustine are thus today spread out among several different art museums. Double-sided wing panels were often sawn apart by dealers or collectors, to give two paintings for hanging.

== Types of altarpieces ==
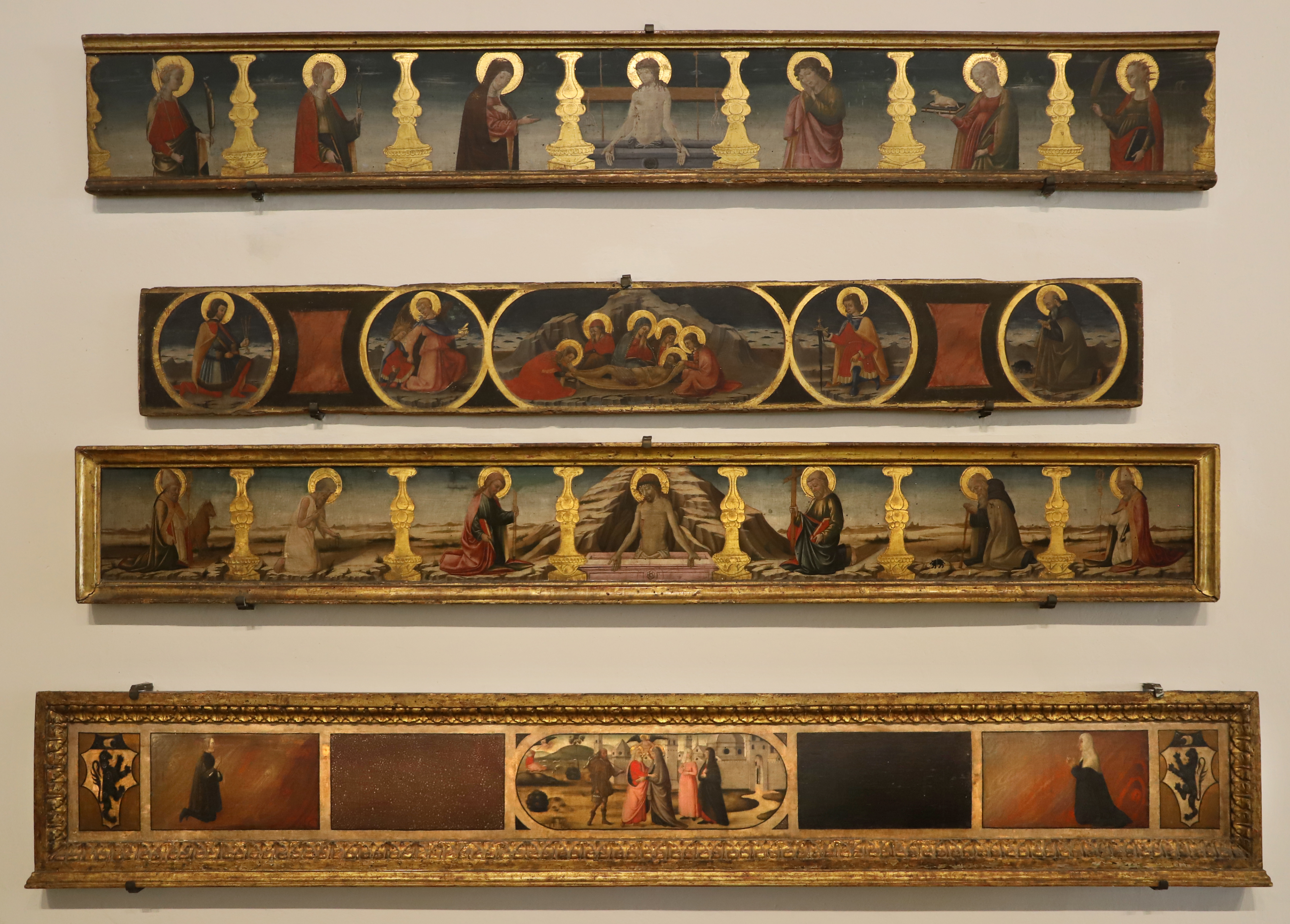
Four detached predelle in a museum, mostly by Neri di Bicci

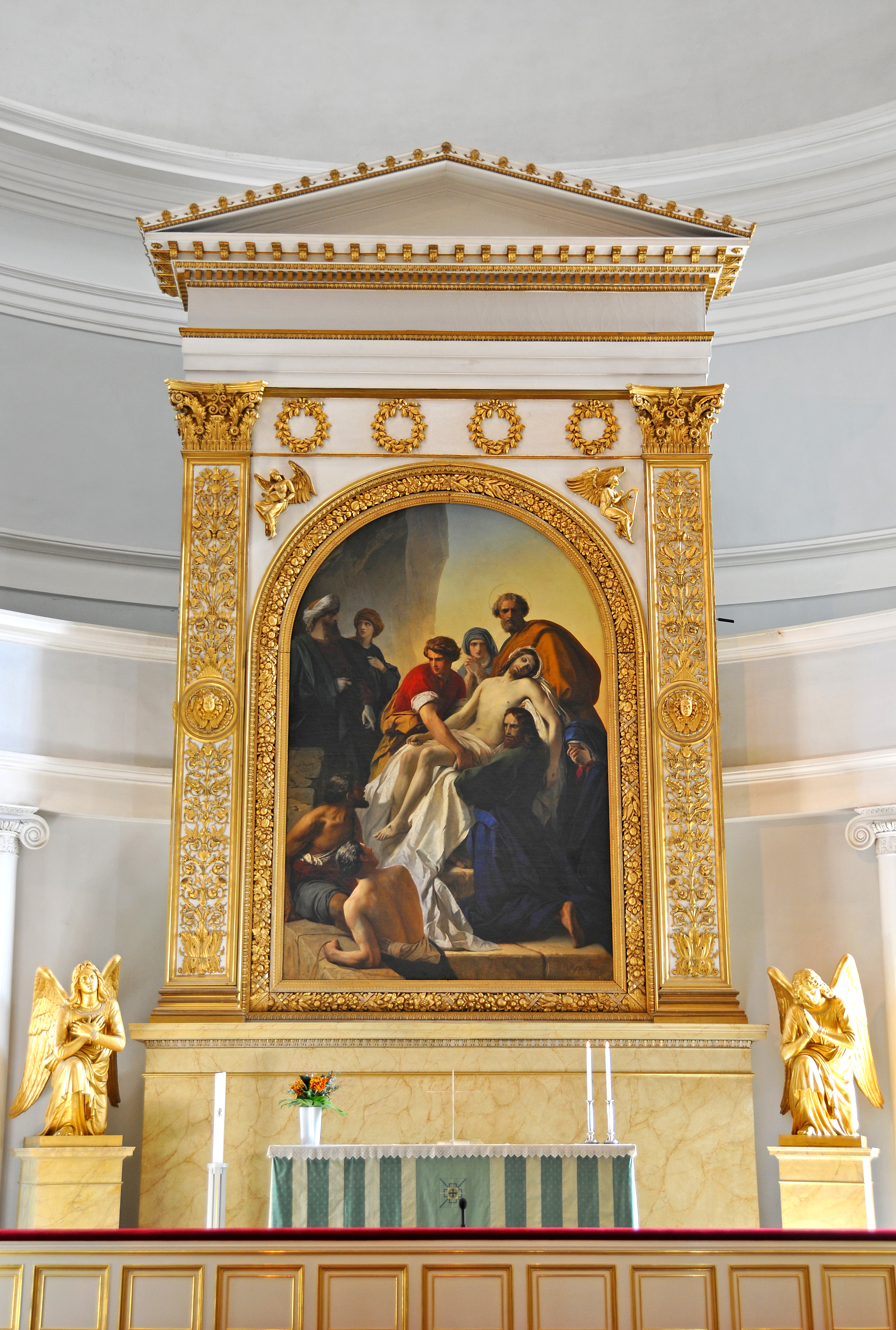
Neoclassical altarpiece by Carl Timoleon von Neff, Helsinki Cathedral (Lutheran), c. 1850

Altarpieces have never been made compulsory in the Catholic Church, nor their usage and treatment formalised, apart from some church authorities laying down guidelines on subject-matter and style after the 16th-century Council of Trent; therefore their appearance can vary significantly. In the Lutheran churches, altarpieces are seen as "venerable and ancient, at least 1700 years old, calling forth man's best efforts, and highest gifts." Their role, according to the Evangelical-Lutheran Church in Denmark, is to "visually reinforce the understanding of the stories that we find in the Bible of the Eucharist and of the Christian fellowship." Occasionally, the demarcation between what constitutes the altarpiece and what constitutes other forms of decoration can be unclear. Altarpieces can still broadly be divided into two types, the reredos, which signifies a large and often complex wooden or stone altarpiece, and the retable, an altarpiece with panels either painted or with reliefs. Retables are placed directly on the altar or on a surface behind it; a reredos typically rises from the floor.

Older retable-type altarpieces are often made up of two or more separate wood panels, sometimes with framed divisions, as in medieval examples, but later with the joins between panels invisible under the painted surface (as with some works by Rubens. They may also display reliefs or sculpture in the round, either polychrome or un-painted. It is then called a diptych, triptych or polyptych for two, three, and multiple panels respectively. In the 13th century, each panel was usually surmounted with a pinnacle, but during the Renaissance, single-panel pala altarpieces became the norm. In both cases, the supporting plinth (predella) often featured supplementary and related paintings.

The Altarpiece of Pellegrino II of about 1200 (in Cividale, Italy) is a rare survival of a large partly-gilded silver relief altarpiece. Such pieces may have been more common, but later melted down for the metal.

At least in the 15th century, altarpieces for main or high altars were required by canon law to be free-standing, allowing passage behind them, while those for side chapels were often attached to, or painted, the wall behind.

If the altar stands free in the choir, such that visitors can pass behind the main altar, both sides of the altarpiece can be covered with painting. The screen, retable or reredos are commonly decorated. Groups of statuary can also be placed on an altar. A single church can furthermore house several altarpieces on side-altars in chapels. Sometimes the altarpiece is set on the altar itself and sometimes in front of it.

Much smaller private altarpieces, often portable, were made for wealthy individuals to use at home, often as folding diptychs or triptychs for safe transport. In the Middle Ages, very small luxury diptychs or triptychs carved in ivory or other materials were popular.

In Eastern Orthodoxy, the iconostasis developed as a wide screen composed of large icons, placed in front of the altar, with doors through it, spanning sanctuary.

== Leading examples ==
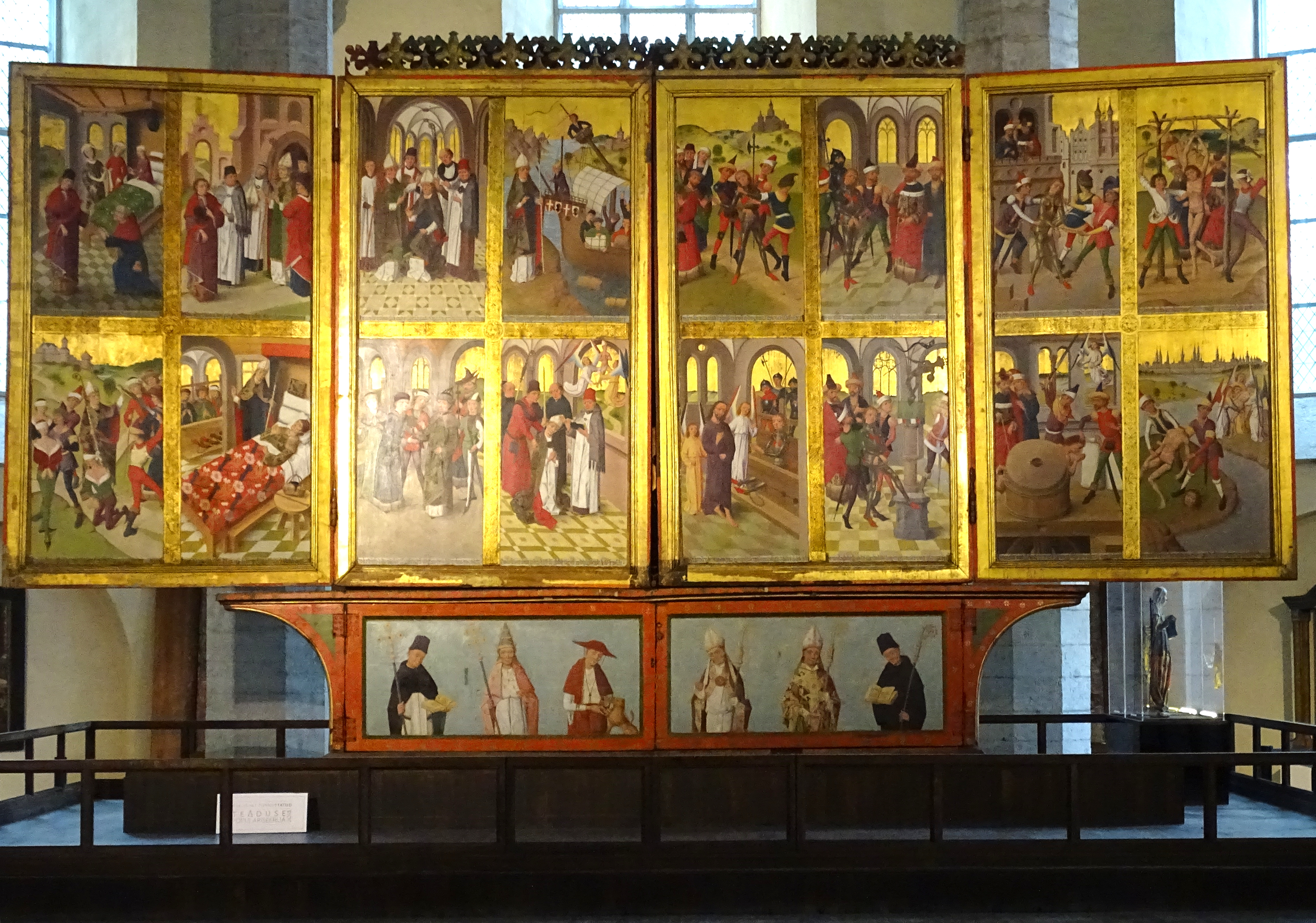
A polyptych altarpiece, workshop of the Lübeck master Hermen Rode in 1478–1481, at the High Altar of St. Nicholas Church (Lutheran) in Tallinn, Estonia

- Pala d'Oro, metal and enamel in Byzantine style (St Mark's Basilica, Venice)
- Maestà altarpiece (1308–1311) by Duccio (Siena Cathedral, Siena)
- Adoration of the Magi by Gentile da Fabriano, 1423, Uffizi, Florence
- Mérode Altarpiece (1425–1428) by Robert Campin (Metropolitan Museum of Art, New York City)
- Holy Trinity by Masaccio, c. 1427, in fresco
- Ghent Altarpiece (1432) by Hubert and Jan van Eyck (St Bavo's Cathedral, Ghent)
- The Descent from the Cross, Rogier van der Weyden, c. 1435, Prado
- Martyrdom of Saint Sebastian, Pollaiuolo brothers, by 1475, London
- Virgin of the Rocks by Leonardo da Vinci, two versions, now Louvre and London
- St. Wolfgang Altarpiece (1481) by Michael Pacher, St. Wolfgang im Salzkammergut
- San Giobbe Altarpiece by Giovanni Bellini, c. 1487, an early example whose background continues the architecture of the church
- Altarpiece of Veit Stoss (1489) by Veit Stoss (St. Mary's Basilica, Kraków)
- Kefermarkt Altarpiece (1490–1497) by an unknown artist (Kefermarkt)
- Castelfranco Madonna, by Giorgione, c. 1504
- Isenheim Altarpiece (1516) by Matthias Grünewald (Unterlinden Museum, Colmar)
- Assumption of the Virgin (1516–1518) by Titian (Santa Maria Gloriosa dei Frari, Venice)
- Volterra Deposition by Rosso Fiorentino, 1521, Mannerist
- Vision of Saint Jerome by Parmigianino, 1527, now National Gallery, London
- Assumption by Rubens, Antwerp Cathedral, 1626
