= Polyptych of Irminon =

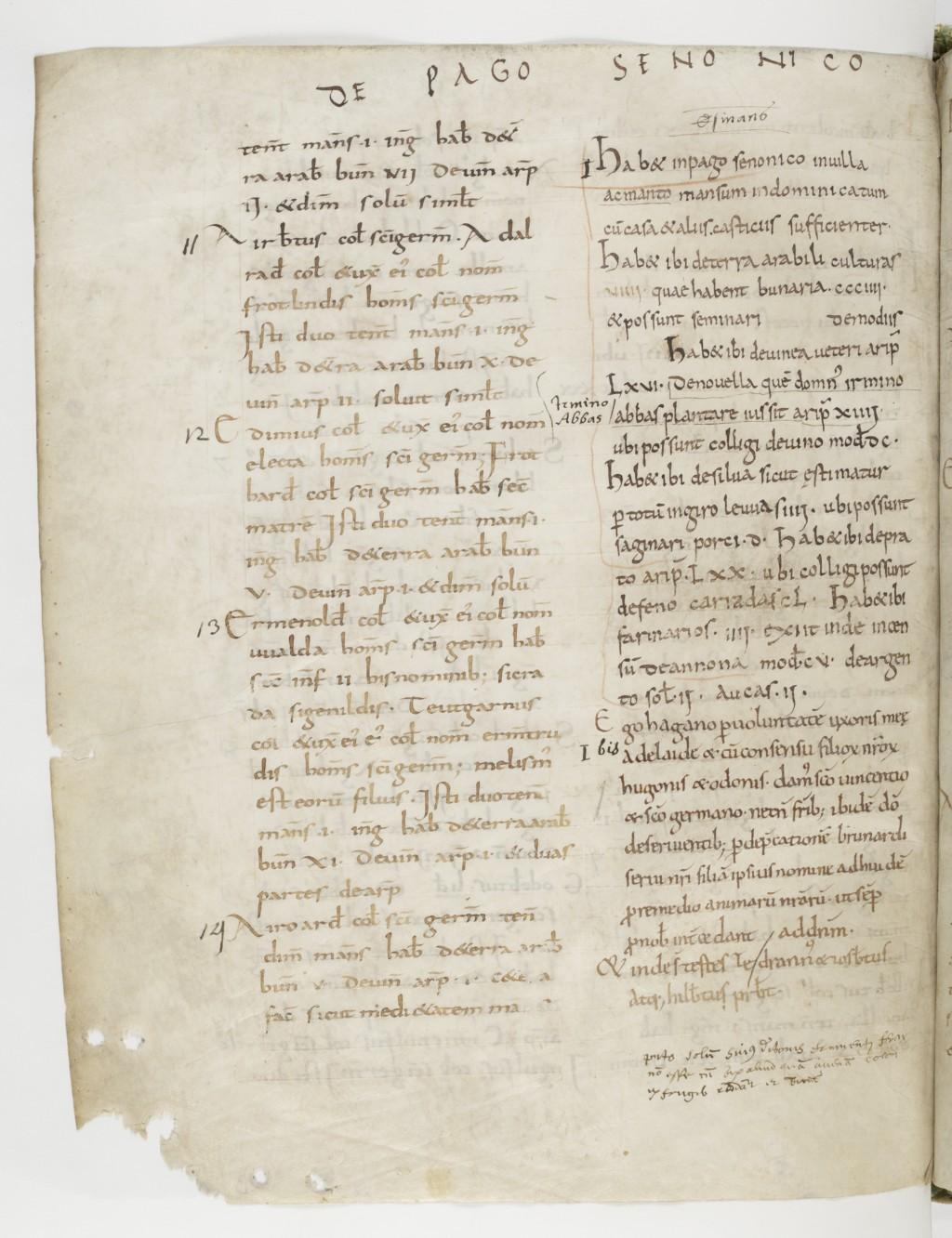
Extract of the polyptych

The Polyptych of Irminon, also known as the Polyptych of Saint-Germain, is an inventory of properties compiled around 823 by Irminon, the abbot of the Saint-Germain-des-Prés in France.

The Polyptych describes the possessions of the monastery, located primarily in the Paris region, between the rivers Seine and Eure. It lists the names of thousands of tenants and their children.

== History of the text ==
The Polyptych text is preserved in a ninth-century manuscript, containing 20 quires that describe 25 villages or settlements, and that name more than 10,000 individuals living on these lands. At least four other quires have been lost, together with almost all of a sister volume listing lands given in benefice.

The repetition of a chapter shows that the Polyptych, in its current form, was produced from a number of working copies, and was written by about a dozen scribes. The Polyptych seems to have been based on two tours of local enquiry undertaken by monks, each one asking inhabitants a different set of questions in the estates they visited.

== Editions ==
- Benjamin Guérard, Polyptyque de l’abbé Irminon de Saint-Germain-des-Prés, ou dénombrement des manses, des serfs et des revenus de l’abbaye de Saint-Germain-des-Prés sous le règne de Charlemagne, t. 1 (Prolégomènes), t. 2 (Polyptyque), Paris, 1844.
- Auguste Longnon, Polyptyque de l’abbaye de Saint-Germain-des-Prés, rédigé au temps de l’abbé Irminon, 2 vol., Paris, 1886–1895.
- Das Polyptychon von Saint-Germain-des-Prés. Studienausgabe, edited by Dieter Hägermann, Konrad Elmshäuser, Andreas Hedwig, Köln-Weimar-Wien, 1993.

== Bibliography ==
- Jean-Pierre Devroey, Problèmes de critique autour du polyptyque de l'abbaye de Saint-Germain-des-Prés, in: La Neustrie. Les pays au nord de la Loire de 650 à 850, éd. A. Atsma, (Beihefte der Francia, 16), Sigmaringen, 1989, p. 441-465.
- Jean-Pierre Devroey, Économie rurale et société dans l'Europe franque (VIe-IXe siècles), 1, Fondements matériels, échanges et lien social, Paris, Belin, 2003, 381 p.
