= Ašvieniai =

Divine twins in Lithuanian mythology

Usins and Martins
- Divine twins of Lithuanian mythology
- Horse heads crossed on a gable, a common symbol of the Ašvieniai.
- Festivals: St. Martin's Day (Martins)

Genealogy
- Parents: Lada (or sometimes Saulė) and Dievs'
- Siblings: Numerous sisters
- Consorts: Saulė and Surya

Equivalents
- Greek: Castor and Pollux
- Latvian: Dieva dēli
- Vedic: Ashvins

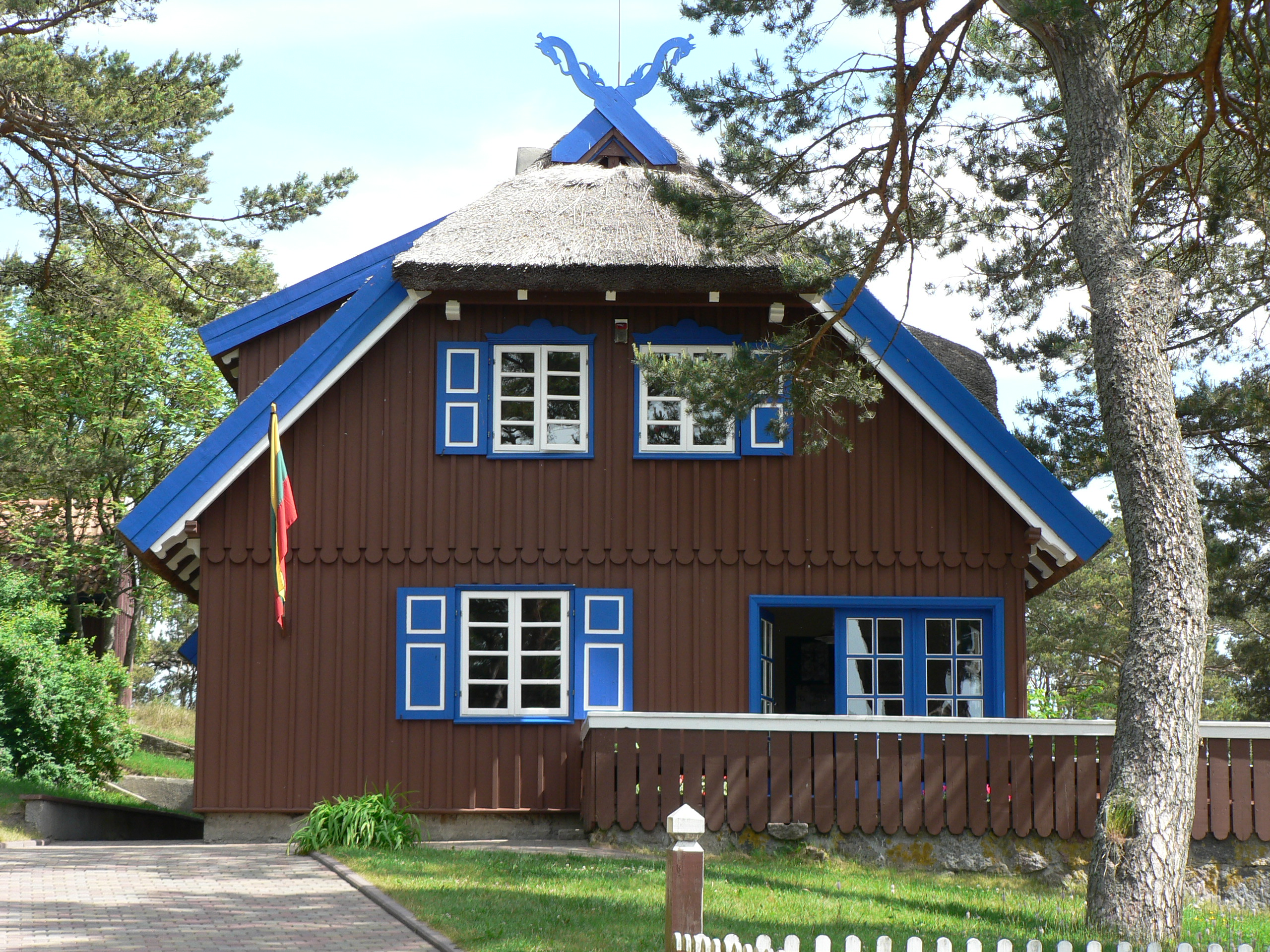
Ašvieniai, commonly called the little horses, on the rooftop of a house in Nida

The Ašvieniai (Lithuanian pronunciation: [aːʃvɪɛnɪaːɪ]) are divine twins named Usins and Martins in Baltic and Lithuanian mythology, identical to Latvian Dieva dēli and the Baltic counterparts of the Vedic Ashvins. Both names derive from the same Proto-Indo-European root for the horse – *ék̂wos: Old Lithuanian ašva and Sanskrit aśva mean "horse". Like the Greek Dioscuri Castor and Pollux, they are reflexes of a common Indo-European mytheme, the Divine Twins. They are also called Dievo suneliai (Lithuanian pronunciation: [dɪɛvoː suːnɛɫɪaːɪ], "Sons of God").

The Ašvieniai are represented as pulling the carriage of Saulė (the Sun) through the sky. Ašvieniai, depicted as žirgeliai or little horses, are common motifs on Lithuanian rooftops, placed for protection of the house. Similar motifs can also be found on beehives, harnesses, bed frames, and other household objects. Ašvieniai are related to Lithuanian Ūsinis and Latvian Ūsiņš (cf. Vedic Ushas), gods of horses.

== Description and mythology ==
The Ašvieniai have been described as the twin divine horses that pull the sun chariot of Saules Meitia across the sky.

Other versions have Usins as the sole charioteer or have that the pair are able to take both horse and human forms. Usins was associated with spring and summer, when horses were ridden and grazed in the fields, while Martins cared for horses during the fall and winter when they were kept in stables. Usins in particular is described as having white hair in human form, while they both have white hair as horses.

Usins and Martins' father is Dievs, with their mother being either Lada or Saules Meitia. They are also sometimes described as the husbands of Surya and Saules Meitia in Lithuanian folklore.

Martins is associated with the festival of Martini on November 10th, and Usins with the festival of Jurģi on April 23rd.

== Folk art ==
Horse motifs, especially twin horses, are common in Lithuanian folk art. The Ašvieniai are often associated with imagery of the sun and the tree of life. Pairs of horseheads can be frequently found on crossed gables, sometimes with the tree of life placed between them. They can also be found on textile tools like distaffs, spindles, and looms, as well as chairs. Horses have been found carved on bedposts of newlywed couples, as the Ašvieniai are often symbolic of love and happiness.

== See also ==
- Ashvins
- Hengist and Horsa
- Thracian horseman
- List of Lithuanian gods and mythological figures
- Proto-Indo-European mythology
- Baltic mythology
- Prussian mythology
- Lithuanian mythology
