= Divine twins =

Proto-Indo-European mytheme

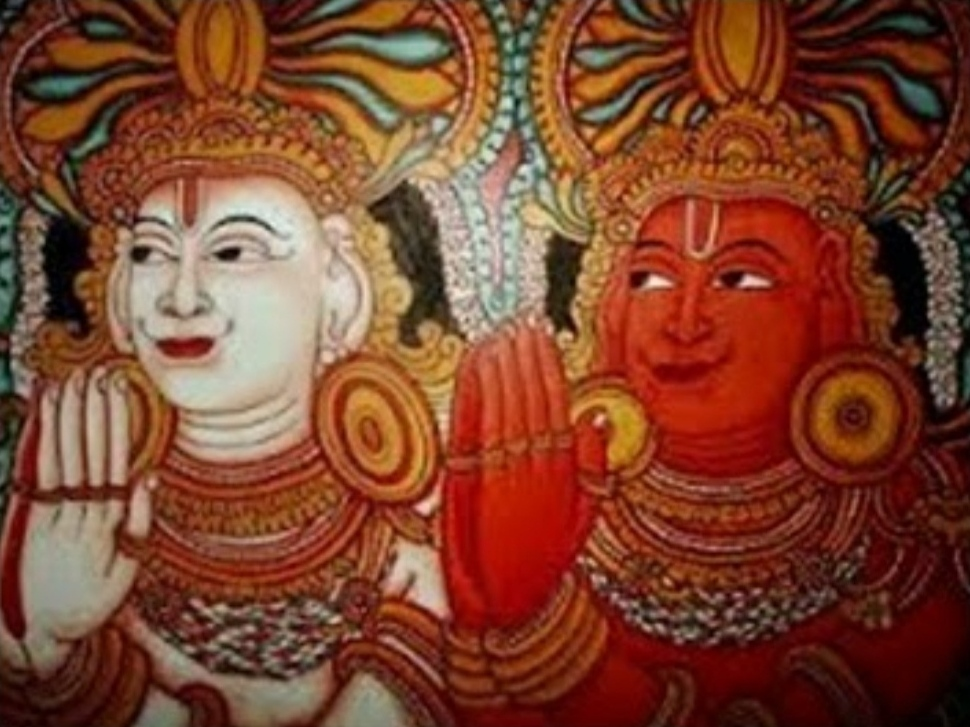
The Vedic Hindu twin gods - Ashvins.

The divine twins are youthful horsemen, either gods or demigods, who serve as rescuers and healers in Proto-Indo-European mythology.

Like other Proto-Indo-European divinities, the Divine Twins are not directly attested by archaeological or written materials, but scholars of comparative mythology and Indo-European studies generally agree on the motifs they have reconstructed by way of the comparative method.

== Common traits ==
Scholar Donald Ward proposed a set of common traits that pertain to divine twin pairs of Indo-European mythologies:

- dual paternity;
- mention of a female figure (their mother or their sister);
- deities of fertility;
- known by a single dual name or having rhymed / alliterative names;
- associated with horses;
- saviours at sea;
- of astral nature;
- protectors of oaths;
- mischievous;
- providers of divine aid in battle; and
- magic healers.

== Name ==
Although the Proto-Indo-European (PIE) name of the Divine Twins cannot be reconstructed with certainty based on the available linguistic evidence, the most frequent epithets associated with the two brothers in liturgic and poetic traditions are the "Youthful" and the "Descendants" (sons or grandsons) of the Sky-God (Dyēus).

Two well-accepted reflexes of the Divine Twins, the Vedic Aśvins and the Lithuanian Ašvieniai, are linguistic cognates ultimately deriving from the Proto-Indo-European word for the horse, *h_{1}éḱwos. They are related to Sanskrit áśva and Avestan aspā (both from Indo-Iranian *Haćwa), and to Old Lithuanian ašva, which all share the meaning of "mare". This may point to an original PIE divine name *h_{1}éḱw-n-, although this form could also have emerged from later contacts between Proto-Indo-Iranian and Proto-Balto-Slavic speakers, which are known to have occurred in prehistoric times.

== Role ==
Represented as young men rescuing mortals from peril in battle or at sea, the Divine Twins rode the steeds that pull the sun across the sky and were sometimes depicted as horses themselves. They shared a sister, *H₂éwsōs 'Dawn', who is also portrayed as the daughter of *Dyēus 'Sky' in Indo-European mythology. The two brothers are generally depicted as healers and helpers, travelling in miraculous vehicles to save shipwrecked mortals. They are often differentiated: one is represented as a physically strong and aggressive warrior, while the other is seen as a healer who gives attention to domestic duties, agrarian pursuits, or romantic adventures.

In the Vedic, Greek and Baltic traditions, the Divine Twins similarly appear as the personifications of the morning and evening star. They are depicted as the lovers or the companions of a solar female deity, preferably the Sun's daughter but sometimes also the Dawn. In most stories in which they appear, the Divine Twins rescue the Dawn from a watery peril, a theme that stems from their role as the solar steeds.

During the night, the Divine Twins were said to return to the east in a golden boat, where they traversed a sea (Note: The northern Black Sea or the Sea of Azov.) to bring back the rising sun each morning. During the day, they crossed the nocturnal sky in pursuit of their consort, the morning star. In what seems to be a later addition confined to Europe, they were said to rest at the end of the day on the Fortunate Isles, a land situated in the sea in the West with magical apples on it in the Garden of the Hesperides. By the Bronze Age, the Divine Twins were also represented as the coachmen of horse-driven solar chariots.

== Evidence ==
=== Linguistic cognates ===
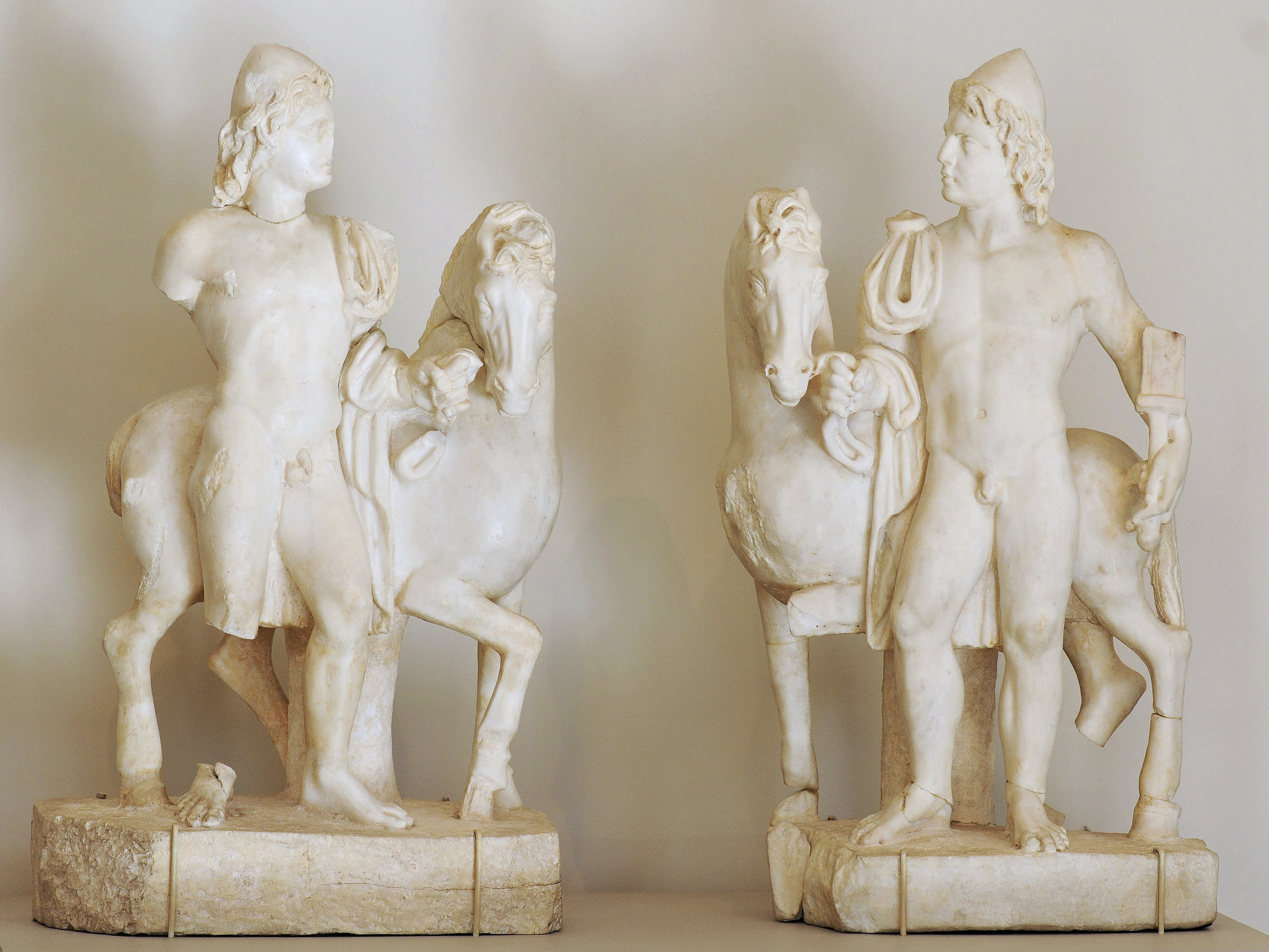
Pair of Roman statuettes (3rd century AD) depicting the Dioscuri as horsemen.

Three Indo-European traditions (Greek, Indic and Baltic) attest the mytheme of equestrian twins, all associated with the dawn or the sun's daughter. Although their names do not form a complete group of cognates, they nonetheless share a similar epithet, suggesting a possible ancestral name or epithet: the 'sons (or descendants) of Dyēus'.

- (?) proto-Indo-European mythology: *diwós suHnū́ ('sons of Dyēus'), or *diwós népoth_{1}e ('descendants of Dyēus'),
- Historical Vedic religion: the divó nápātā Aśvins, the "sons of Dyaús", always referred to in dual in the Rigveda without individual names,
- Lithuanian mythology: the Dievo sūneliai (the Ašvieniai), the "sons of Dievas", pulling the solar carriage of Saulė through the sky,
- Latvian mythology: the Dieva Dēli, the "sons of Dievs", the sky-god,
- Greek mythology: the Diós-kouroi Castor and Pollux, the "boys of Zeus".
- Italic languages: both Paelignian Ioviois Pvclois and Marsian Ioveis Pvcles are interpreted as a calque of the Greek theonym Diós-kouroi.

=== Possible reflexes ===
Since they cannot be linked together to a common linguistic origin, other reflexes found in the Indo-European myths are less secure, although their motifs can be compared to that of the Divine Twins.

==== Celtic ====
The Gaulish Divanno and Dinomogetimarus are said to be protective deities and "the Gallic equivalents" of the Greek Dioskouroi. They seem to be represented in monuments and reliefs in France flanked by horses, which would make them comparable to Gaulish Martes and the Germanic Alcis. Scholars suggest that the numerous Gallo-Roman dedicatory epigraphs to Castor and Pollux, more than any other region of the Roman Empire, attest a cult of the Dioskoroi.

Greek historian Timaeus mentions that Atlantic Celts venerated the "Dioskouroi" above all other gods and that they [Dioskouroi] had visited them from across the Ocean. Historian Diodorus Siculus, in the fourth book of Bibliotheca historica, writes that the Celts who dwelt along the ocean worshipped the Dioscuroi "more than the other gods". The conjecture that it refers to the Gallic gods Divanno and Dinomogetimarus has no firm support.

In one of the Irish myths involving Macha (the Dindsenchas of Ard Macha), she is forced to race against the horses of King of Ulster while in late pregnancy. As a talented rider, she wins the race but starts giving birth to Fír and Fial immediately after crossing the finish line. The archetype is also partly matched by figures such as the Gallic sun god Belenus, whose epithet Atepomarus meant "having good horses"; Grannus, who is associated with the healing goddess Sirona (her name means "star"); Maponos ("Son of God"), considered in Irish mythology as the son of Dagda, associated with healing,

The Welsh Brân and Manawydan may also be reflexes of the Divine Twins.

Comparative mythologist Alexander Haggerty Krappe suggested that two heroes, Feradach and Foltlebar, brothers and sons of the king of Innia, are expressions of the mytheme. These heroes help the expedition of the Fianna into Tir fa Thuinn (a realm on the other side of the sea), in a Orphean mission to rescue some of their members, in the tale The pursuit of the Gilla Decair and his horse. Both are expert navigators: one can build a ship and the other can follow the wild birds.

Other possible candidates are members of Lugh's retinue, Atepomarus and Momorus (fr). Atepomarus is presumed to mean "Great Horseman" or "having great horses", based on the possible presence of Celtic stem -epo- 'horse' in his name. Both appear as a pair of Celtic kings and founders of Lugdunum. They escape from Sereroneus and arrive at a hill. Momorus, who had skills in augury, sees a murder of crows and names the hill Lougodunum, after the crows. This myth is reported in the works of Klitophon of Rhodes and in Pseudo-Plutarch's De fluviis.

==== Germanic ====
Tacitus mentions a divine pair of twins called the Alcis worshipped by the Naharvali, whom he compares to the Roman twin horsemen Castor and Pollux. These twins can be associated with the Indo-European myth of the divine twin horsemen (Dioscuri) attested in various Indo-European cultures. Among later Germanic peoples, twin founding figures such as Hengist and Horsa allude to the motif of the divine twins. The Anglo-Saxon heroes are said to have come by the sea in response to a plea from the beleaguered British king Vortigern. Descendants of Odin, their names mean 'Stallion' and 'Horse', respectively, strengthening the connection.

In Scandinavia, images of divine twins are attested from the 15th century BCE until the 8th century CE, after which they disappear, apparently as a result of religious change. Swedish historian Jonathan Lindström posits that the Hemsta petroglyph (1700BCE - 500BCE), located in Enköping municipality, depicts the divine twins aiding the hero Ingwaz on his journey eastwards. Norse texts contain no identifiable divine twins, though scholars have sought parallels between gods and heroes.

The myth of the Icelandic settlers Ingólfr Arnarson and Hjörleifr Hróðmarsson, which appears in the legendary account of the settlement of Iceland, may contain several motifs of the Indo-European twin mytheme (being founders and brothers), also paralleling Hengist and Horsa.

Another founding pair of twins in Germanic tradition is brothers Dan and Angul, described in the Gesta Danorum by scholar Saxo Grammaticus.

The Haddingjar were two brothers who appear in many versions of Germanic legends.

==== Graeco-Roman ====
Amphion and Zethus, another pair of twins fathered by Zeus and Antiope, are portrayed as the legendary founders of Thebes. They are called "Dioskouroi, riders of white horses" (λευκόπωλοι) by Euripides in his play The Phoenician Women (the same epithet is used in Heracles and in the lost play Antiope). In keeping with the theme of distinction between the twins, Amphion was said to be the more contemplative, sensitive one, whereas Zethus was more masculine and tied to physical pursuits, like hunting and cattle-breeding.

The mother of Romulus and Remus, Rhea Silvia, placed them in a basket before her death, which she put in the river to protect them from murder, before they were found by the she-wolf who raised them. The Palici, a pair of Sicilian twin deities fathered by Zeus in one account, may also be a reflex of the original mytheme.

Greek rhetorician and grammar Athenaeus of Naucratis, in his work Deipnosophistae, Book II, cited that poet Ibycus, in his Melodies, described twins Eurytus and Cteatus as "λευκίππους κόρους" ("white-horsed youths") and said they were born from a silver egg, a story that recalls the myth of Greek divine twins Castor and Pollux and their mother Leda. This pair of twins was said to have been fathered by sea god Poseidon and a human mother, Molione. (Note: Claire Louise Wilkinson seems to agree with the theory that the twin pairs of Greek mythology hark back to a "common root".)

==== Baltic ====
There is possibility that Ūsiņš (alternately, Ūsinis), a Baltic god mentioned in the dainas, is a reflex of the mytheme in Latvian tradition. He is associated with horses, the light and sun, and possibly one of the sons of Dievs. Historical linguist Václav Blažek argues he is "a functional and etymological counterpart" of a minor Vedic character Auśijá- (a servant of the Vedic twins and related to bees) and the Aśvins themselves. Also, according to David Leeming, Usins appears as a charioteer, conducting a chariot pulled by two horses across the sky.

It has also been argued that Auseklis is the other reflex of the mytheme in Latvian. Auseklis is referred to as male in the context of the dainas (folksong), and is seen as the groom of Saules meita ("daughter of the sun"), who came all the way to Germany to court her. In addition, according to scholar Elza Kokare, Auseklis belongs to a group of heavenly deities that take part in a mythological drama about a "celestial wedding". Auseklis is seen as a groom of Saules meita, a daughter of Saule, the female Baltic sun. Sometimes, he is deprived of his bride (Ausekļa līgaviņa and variations) because of Meness's quarreling. In other accounts, he is a guest or member of the bridal cortege at the wedding of Saules meita with another character. He is also said to own a horse, bought by him or for him. According to Marija Gimbutas's analysis, Auseklis is a "dievaitis" ('little god') that appears with a horse the Sun gave him, and falls in love with the daughter of the (female) Sun ("Saules dukterims").

==== Slavic ====
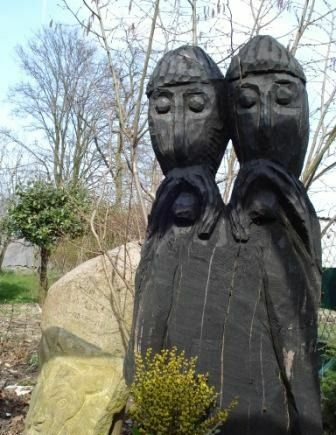
A copy of the twin statue from the island of Fischerinsel

The Polish deities Lel and Polel, first mentioned by Maciej Miechowita in 1519, are presented as the equivalents of Castor and Pollux, the sons of the goddess Łada (counterpart of the Greek Leda) and an unknown male god. An idol was found in 1969 on the Fischerinsel island, where the cult centres of the Slavic tribe of Veleti was located, depicting two male figures joined with their heads. Scholars believe it may represent Lel and Polel. Lelek means "strong youth" in Russian dialect. The brightest stars of the Gemini constellation, α Gem and β Gem, are thought to have been originally named Lele and Polele in Belarusian tradition, after the twin characters.

According to Polish professor of medieval history, Jacek Banaszkiewicz, the two Polabian gods, Porevit and Porenut, manifest dioscuric characteristics. According to him, the first part of their names derives from a Proto-Slavic root -por meaning "strength," with first being "Lord of strength" – the stronger one, and the other "Lord in need of support (strength)" – the weaker one. They both have five faces each and appear alongside Rugiaevit, the chief god.

During childbirth, the mother of the Polish hero twins Waligóra ("Mountain Beater") and Wyrwidąb ("Oak Tearer") died in the forest, where wild animals took care of them. Waligóra was raised of by a she-wolf and Wyrwidąb by a she-bear, who fed them with their own milk. Together, they defeated the dragon who tormented the kingdom, for which the grateful king gave each of them half of the kingdom and one of his two daughters as a wife. The sons of Krak: Krak II and Lech II also appear in Polish legends as the killers of the Wawel dragon.

==== Indo-Iranian ====
Another possible reflex may be found in Nakula and Sahadeva. Mothered by Princess Madri, who summoned the Aśvins themselves in a prayer to beget her sons (thus them being called Ashvineya (आश्विनेय)), the twins are two of the five Pandava brothers, married to the same woman, Draupadi. In the Mahabharata epic, Nakula is described in terms of his exceptional beauty, warriorship and martial prowess, while Sahadeva is depicted as patient, wise, intelligent and a "learned man". Nakula takes great interest in Virata's horses, and his brother Sahadeva become Virata's cowherd. Scholarship also points out that the Vedic Ashvins had an Avestic counterpart called Aspinas.

==== Armenian ====
The Armenian heroes Sanasar and Baldasar appear as twins in the epic tradition, born of princess Tsovinar (as depicted in Daredevils of Sassoun); Sanasar finds a "fiery horse", is more warlike than his brother, and becomes the progenitor of a dynasty of heroes. In an alternate account, their mother is named princess Saṙan, who drinks water from a horse's footprint and gives birth to both heroes.

Scholar Armen Petrosyan also sees possible reflexes of the divine twins in other pairs of heroic brothers in Armenian epic tradition, e.g., Ar(a)maneak and Ar(a)mayis; Eruand (Yervant) and Eruaz (Yervaz). In the same vein, Sargis Haroutyunian argues that the Armenian heroes, as well as twins Izzadin (or Izaddin) and Zyaddin (mentioned in the Kurdish Sharafnama), underlie the myth of divine twins: pairs of brother-founders of divine origin.

==== Albanian ====
The pair of heroic brothers and main characters of the Albanian legendary epic cycle Kângë Kreshnikësh – Muji and Halili – are considered to bear common traits of the Indo-European divine twins.

== Legacy ==
=== In mythology and religion ===
The mytheme of the Divine Twins was widely popular in the Indo-European traditions; evidence for their worship can be found from Scandinavia to the Near East as early as the Bronze Age. The motif was also adopted in non-Indo-European cultures, as attested by the Etruscan Tinas Clenar, the "sons of Jupiter". There might also have been a worship of twin deities in Myceanean times, based on the presence of myths and stories about pairs of brothers or male twins in Attica and Boeotia.

The most prevalent functions associated with the twins in later myths are magic healers and physicians, sailors and saviours at sea, warriors and providers of divine aid in battle, controllers of weather and keepers of the wind, assistants at birth with a connection to fertility, divinities of dance, protectors of the oath, and founders of cities, sometimes related to swans. Scholarship suggests that the mytheme of twins has echoes in the medieval legend of Amicus and Amelius. In Belarusian folklore, Saints George and Nicholas are paired up together, associated with horses, and have a dual nature as healers. The veneration of the Slavic saint brothers Boris and Gleb may also be related.

=== In literature ===
Literary approaches to the mytheme of the Indo-European Divine Twins can be found in Zeus, a Study in Ancient Religion (1925), by Arthur Bernard Cook. The British scholar posited that some versions of The Dancing Water, the Singing Apple, and the Speaking Bird, collected from Greek and Italian sources, contained some remnants of Helen and her brothers, the Dioskouroi, in the characters of the wonder-children (triplets or two male/one female siblings) with astronomical motifs on their bodies. The idea is reiterated in Angelo de Gubernatis's Zoological Mythology, Vol. 1. The Italian scholar analysed the twins in a variant of The Boys with the Golden Stars format as the "Açvinau" (Asvins) of Vedic lore.

=== In architecture ===
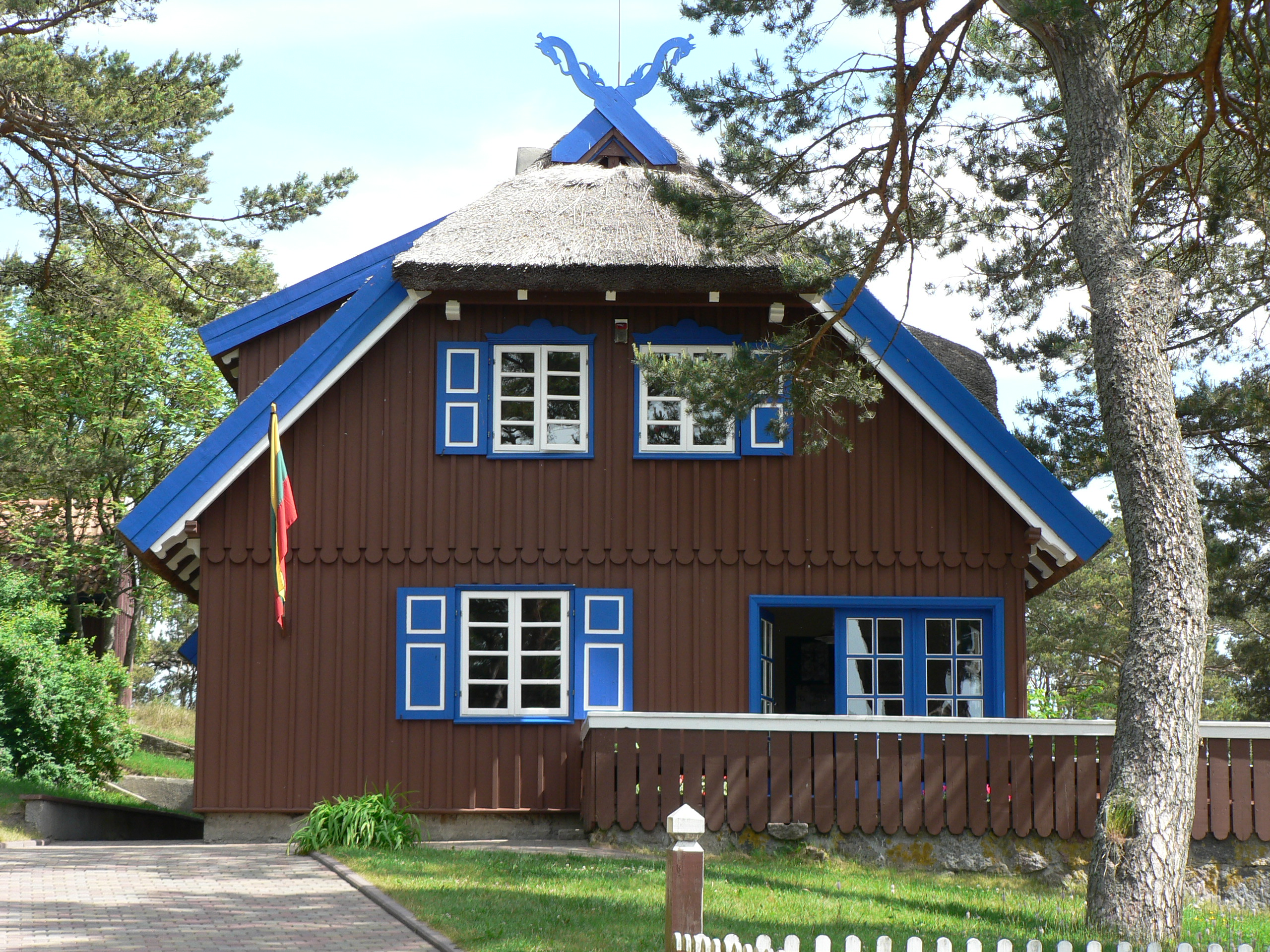
Ašvieniai, commonly called the little horses, on the rooftop of a house in Nida, Lithuania

Ašvieniai, depicted as žirgeliai or little horses, are common motifs on Lithuanian rooftops, placed for protection of the house. Similar motifs can also be found on beehives, harnesses, bed frames, and other household objects.

A similar imagery appears in the decoration of Fachhallenhaus, a type of Low German house: the point of the gables consists of carved wooden boards in the shape of (stylised) horses' heads, often serving to protect the edges of the roof from the wind. The horses' heads are attributed to the symbol of the Saxons, the Saxon Steed. Its distribution as decoration on roof ridges is also reflected in the coats of arms of several north Germany towns and villages. These crossed horseheads are said to be "an old pagan symbol". This symbol, also named "Gable Cross" (de), was possibly associated with legendary founders Hengist and Horsa, since it was called Hengst und Hors.

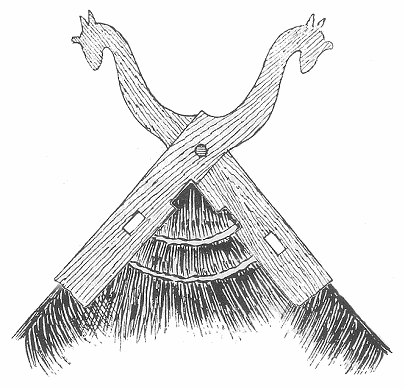
Drawing of a gable decoration 1901

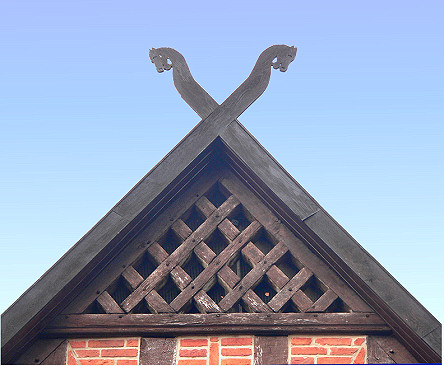
Gable decoration in 2006

Horses' heads on the coat of arms of Buchholz in der Nordheide

Coat of arms from Spornitz in Mecklenburg-Vorpommern

== See also ==
- Horse sacrifice
- Korean creation narratives
- Lugal-irra and Meslamta-ea
- Maya Hero Twins (Maya mythology)

== Bibliography ==
- Andrén, Anders (2020). "Divine Twins". In Schjødt, Jens Peter; Lindow, John; Andrén, Anders (eds.). The Pre-Christian Religions of the North: History and Structures. Vol. 3. Brepols. pp. 1453–1463. ISBN 978-2-503-57489-9.
- Banaszkiewicz, Jacek (1996). "Pan Rugii - Rugiewit i jego towarzysze z Gardźca: Porewit i Porenut (Saxo Gramatyk, Gesta Danorum XIV, 39,38-41)". In Kurnatowska, Zofia (ed.). Słowiańszczyzna w Europie średniowiecznej. Vol. 1. Wrocław: WERK. pp. 75–82. ISBN 83-901964-7-6.
- Beekes, Robert S. P. (2011). Comparative Indo-European Linguistics: An Introduction. John Benjamins Publishing. ISBN 978-9027211859.
- Çabej, Eqrem (1968). "Gestalten des albanischen Volksglaubens". In Manfred Mayrhofer (ed.). Studien zur Sprachwissenschaft und Kulturkunde: Gedenkschrift für Wilhelm Brandenstein 1898-1967. Innsbrucker Beiträge zur Kulturwissenschaft. Vol. 14. Auslieferung: Institut für Vergleichende Sprachwissenschaft der Leopold-Franzens-Universität Innsbruck. ISSN 0537-7250.
- Hamacher, Duane W. "The Sumerians and Gemini: Sumerian Astronomical Interpretations as Origins of the Divine Horse Twins and Solar Chariots in Indo-European Mythology (Unpublished manuscript)" (PDF). p. 7. Archived from the original (PDF) on 2011-05-14.
- Jackson, Peter (2002). "Light from Distant Asterisks. Towards a Description of the Indo-European Religious Heritage". Numen. 49 (1): 61–102. doi:10.1163/15685270252772777. JSTOR 3270472.
- Juka, S. S. (1984), Kosova: The Albanians in Yugoslavia in Light of Historical Documents: An Essay, Waldon Press, ISBN 9780961360108
- Mallory, James P.; Adams, Douglas Q. (1997), Encyclopedia of Indo-European Culture, London: Routledge, ISBN 978-1-884964-98-5
- Mallory, James P.; Adams, Douglas Q. (2006), The Oxford Introduction to Proto-Indo-European and the Proto-Indo-European World, Oxford, England: Oxford University Press, ISBN 978-0-19-929668-2
- Neziri, Zymer U. (2008). Institute of Albanology of Prishtina (ed.). Studime për folklorin: Epika gojore dhe etnokultura [The Study of Folklore: The Oral Epic and Ethnoculture]. Vol. II. Grafobeni.
- O'Brien, Steven (1982). "Dioscuric elements in Celtic and Germanic mythology". Journal of Indo-European Studies. 10: 117–136.
- Parpola, Asko (2015). The Roots of Hinduism: The Early Aryans and the Indus Civilization. Oxford University Press. p. 109. ISBN 9780190226923.
- Shapiro, Michael (1982). "Neglected evidence of Dioscurism (divine twinning) in the Old Slavic pantheon". Journal of Indo-European Studies. 10: 137–166.
- Simek, Rudolf (1993). Dictionary of Northern Mythology. D.S. Brewer. ISBN 978-0-85991-513-7.
- West, Morris L. (2007). Indo-European Poetry and Myth. Oxford University Press. ISBN 978-0199280759.
