= Latvian mittens =

Mittens are used heavily in Latvia both for keeping warm and as a cultural symbol. They have been used for centuries as a means of local identification and celebration. Mittens have been particularly important in marriage traditions. They appear in folklore and the stitchwork incorporates symbolism and Latvian mythology.

== History ==
Mitten knitting has occurred for centuries, with some of the earliest pairs of mittens discovered in Latvia dating back 1,000 years. More contemporary knowledge of mittens and their traditional use comes from the Daina (Latvia), where they are frequently referenced. There are regional variations in design as far down as the county level, that which have been documented in Maruta Grasmane’s work "Mittens of Latvia".

== Mitten making ==
Multi-stranded designs provide both elaborate patterns and a thicker, warmer mitten due to the denseness of the fabric created through this process and ability to trap warm air in the floats created in this technique.

Historical color combinations were done in the four colors of blue, green, red, and yellow. Red has highly symbolic meaning in Latvian culture and frequently appears in mitten motifs.

== Cultural significance ==
Mittens were a ceremonial aspect of wedding proceedings. Women and their female relatives would knit pairs of mittens to be presented to the groom’s family and notable places and individuals in the town. High quality mittens could contribute to smaller amounts of livestock in a dowry. Women would often knit dozens of mittens in advance of their wedding to include in their bridal chests, and mittens were used as a way to display the bounty in one's home for the newly married.

In the 21st century mittens continue to be a sign of Latvian culture, being given as gifts to NATO delegates at the 2006 summit.

== Symbolism ==
The patterns and motifs that decorate the mittens are often tied to specific symbolic meanings and local mythology. These meanings can include references to gods, nature, and more. Following is a non-exhaustive list of symbols commonly found in Latvian mitten designs.

Symbol	Description
symbol of a triangle with a dot above the apex	The symbol for God
a horizontal zig-zag line	The symbol for Māra
the arrows pointing to the right in a row	The symbol for Laima
	The symbol for Jumis
A mirrored capitol E with three diamonds in the center followed by a capitol E sitting on top of a large diamond with a hole in the center	The symbol for Ūsiņš
a horizontal S shape	The symbol for an adder
A X with two additional legs curling to the side of each section	The symbol for the firecross
A four paned square surrounded by circles	The symbol for the sun
a straight vertical line with two V's intersecting it	The symbol for Austra's tree
	The symbol for the cross-hatch star
an eight-pointed star	The symbol for the morning star
