= Jurģi =

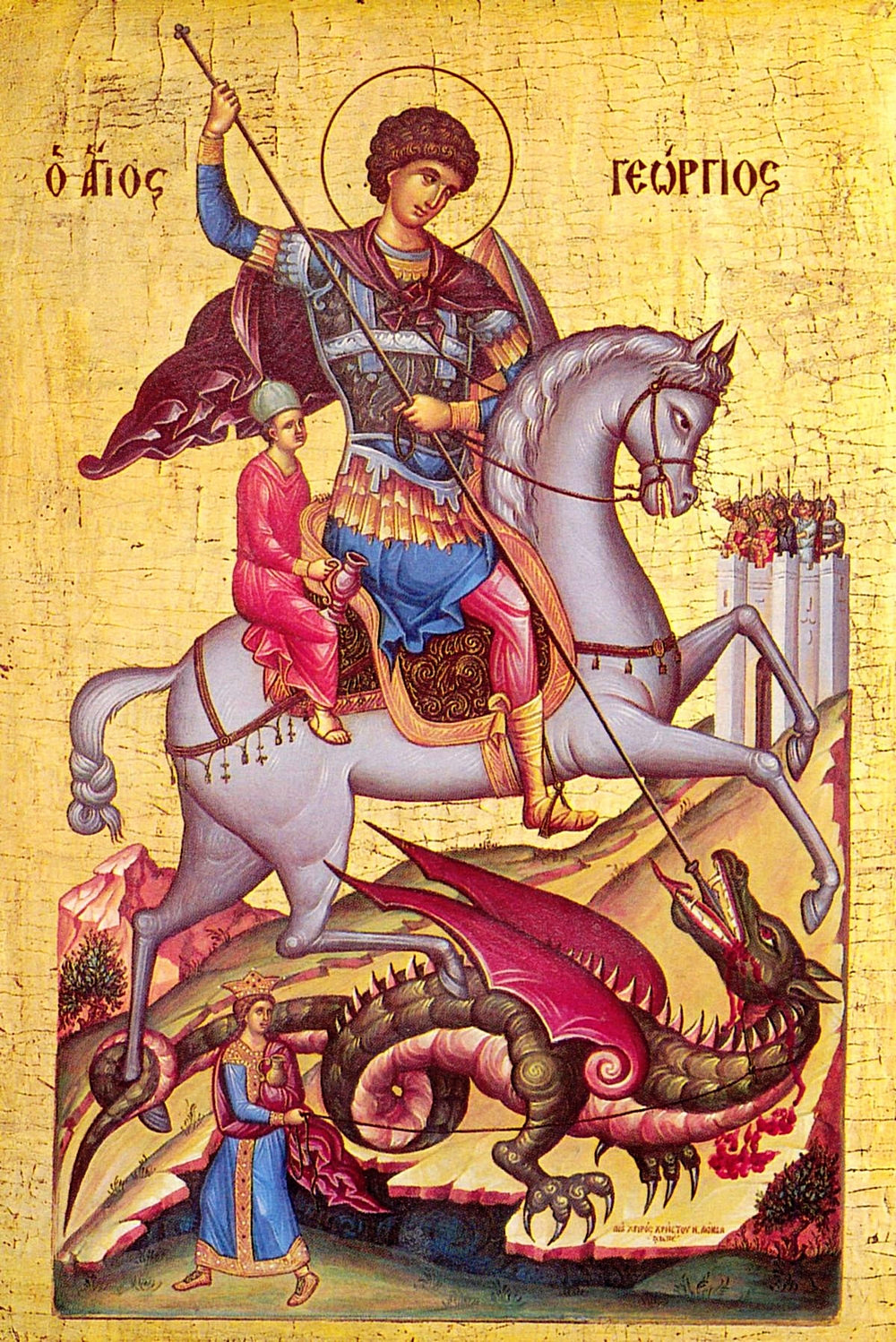
Saint George (Byzantine icon).

Jurģi ([jurɟi]) or Ūsiņš Day is an ancient Latvian spring festival which coincides with the Christian Church's day of feast in honor of Saint George on April 23. After the holidays, it signified the beginning of pieguļa and shepherding. According to a solar calendar, Jurģi day marks the midpoint between the spring solstice (Lieldienas) and summer solstice (Jāņi) and, according to a Julian calendar, it is celebrated on 6 May.

After the abolition of serfdom in 19th century, Jurģi was developed in the Latvian culture on the day of termination of the contract.

== Origin of the Christian holiday ==
The Christian Church celebrates this day in honor of Saint George, one of the first martyrs of Emperor Diocletian. After the Crusades, a legend describing St. George battling on horseback with a dragon, a symbol of paganism and evil, was spreading in Europe. According to this legend, he was a rider, a soldier, a weapons blacksmith, and even a patron of robbers. In Estonia, St. George is a horse god, but in Russia, St. George is not only the patron of horses, but also the shepherd deity.

== Relationship with Ūsiņš ==
In Latvian folk traditions, St. George or Jurģi is usually described as the patron of horses. It is believed that the Christian faith influenced Latvian folk traditions by placing St. George in Ūsiņš place. In one of Valmiera's surveys on traditions, a remark was preserved. In the past, Jurģi Day was known as Ūsiņš Day.

== Jurģi Day's traditions and beliefs ==
When leaving the old place of residence, people did not say goodbyes, so they would not become unhappy in new place of residence. When moving to the new house on Jurģi day, the straw from the old site is taken along and scattered them in the barn, so that the leaving person would not get cursed with any kind of spell. Others also took along stones from the old house and threw them into a new home's barn, to prevent themselves from any strange magic.

Since summer is approaching, Jurģi is also about preserving beauty and health, although it's mostly focuses on how not to get burned. If it snows on Jurģi's morning, people washed their mouth; otherwise - you do not need to wash it, it is in order to not get burned. Before Jurģi, you need to wash with frog tadpoles. Likewise was done with birch juice, before drinking it, use it to wash your mouth. People spitted on anthill, so that ants could shoot acid onto their face; believing it was a remedy from burn down and freckles. People also believed if before Jurģi you walk barefoot and whistle, it would protect you from the fever. When people heard roaring thunder for the first time before Jurģi, they took a stone from the ground, dragged it over the forehead 3 times and put it back. It was done so that the head wouldn't hurt. Jurģi is considered to be one of the warmest days, and it was believed that God threw 3 cold stones on Jacob, Miķeļi and Mārtiņi days, but took them away once they got warm on Jurģi, Pentecost and Jāņi. Time fore-tellers watched, how many days had dew before Jurģi: that way they counted how many days is going to be spent on harvesting rye before Jacob's day. Wind is checked on Jurģi morning; if it's windy on Jurģi, then it meant that it will be windy all year. If it rains on Jurģi, it meant a wet summer, and believed that forest meadows will not have medical herbs because of that. If Jurģi falls on Friday, it meant a miserable year, if on Monday - it meant an unhappy summer. People did not weave on Jurģi day, believing there will be a lot of thunder if they did. They also believed that you should not make wishes or mad dogs will come to their homes. If the fields were light on fire, it meant their home will burn. On Jurģi morning, in front of the sun, people crossed over the field on foot to furrow, so that not a single burdock would grow up. On early Jurģi morning, an oven was built and light, for a smoke to dash out up the chimney. Whoever makes it first, that person will be happy.

== Jurģis Day's meal ==
Loaves of bread on Jurģi Day's meal had to be circular, believing it would help to grow horses and cows. Eggs were eaten or rolled across the back of cows, believing that it would make cows grow plump.

Sauerkraut is often made, which plays an important role in both promoting harmony, and to make strangers stay as long as possible.

When entering the home of new residents on Jurģi, the housekeeper cooked cabbage and gave it to the guest to eat, so that visitors could stay longer at home. On the other hand, if fish was given to eat, it was followed by visitors rapidly leaving their house. On Jurģi day, when the old remnants were moving away, they cooked the cabbage, but when they arrived into a new home, they fried eggs, so that everyone could live in peace like chicks.

When it came to shepherd the cows for the first time, the hostess gave to the shepherd a lot of eggs. The amount of them depended on how many cows they were shepherding. Eggs were boiled, marked with a horse's name, and were given to the person who owned a horse. They removed the eggshell from their eggs; if it sheds good, it meant the horse is fine, if not, then it meant it was better to give it away. During pieguļa pantāga is cooked - the traditional Jurģi food. It is poured into a stake or ax's shaft hole and then blaming this hole with a large stone on top, or first bite it to make a small hole and back-filled it with soil, then pantāga is offered to Ūsiņš. Only after that you could eat it. It only takes boiled and raw eggs to cook pantāga. Pantāga were baked by men over a campfire.
