= Auseklis =

Latvian deity

An auseklis star in the colors of the Latvian flag. Pins and flag tops featuring similar designs were widespread during the Singing Revolution.

Auseklis is a Latvian god, a stellar deity that represents a celestial body, but possibly not the same as Venus (Rīta zvaigzne), the first "star" to appear in the mornings on the east side of the sky. He is the third most popular deity in Latvian mythology after Saulė and Mēness, but is almost exclusively mentioned in folk songs, as pagan faith gave way to Christianity in Latvia in the 12th century.

== Name ==
The name Auseklis stems from the root aus- ('dawn'), attached to the derivative suffix -eklis, and is etymologically related to other Indo-European deities of the dawn.

This deity is also variously known as Auseklenis, Ausekliņš, Auseklīts, Auseklītis, Ausekliņis, Auseklius.

== Role ==
Auseklis is closely associated with Mēness ("moon"). They both are Dieva dēli ("sons of God"), as is Ūsiņš, and are thus confused with each other and with other male deities. Auseklis is referred to as male in the context of the dainas (folksong), and is seen as the groom of Saules meita ("daughter of the sun"), who came all the way to Germany to court her.

He is also said to be the attendant to a Sun deity and helper in the activities of the "heavenly bath house".

According to scholar Elza Kokare, Auseklis belongs to a group of heavenly deities that take part in a mythological drama about a "celestial wedding". Auseklis is seen as a groom of Saules meita, a daughter of Saule, the female Baltic sun - the others being moon god Meness and twin gods Dieva deli. Auseklis, in other accounts, is a guest or member of the bridal cortege at the wedding of Saules meita with another character, or he is deprived of his bride because of Meness's quarreling.

Auseklis is often referred to as being very young. As a reflex of this, he is seen as too young to work with the other deities, is very playful, and his horse is either bought by him or for him by the Sun.

According to Marija Gimbutas's analysis, Auseklis is a "dievaitis" ('little god') that appears with a horse the Sun gave him, and falls in love with the daughter of the (female) Sun ("Saules dukterims").

According to Lithuanian folklorist and ethnologist Nijolė Laurinkienė (lt), Haralds Biezais was of the opinion that Auseklis was a male god and a son of Dievs ("Dievo sunus"). He was also part of the "celestial marriage" drama, being the first betrothed of the Sun's Daughter (Saules meita).

== Symbol ==
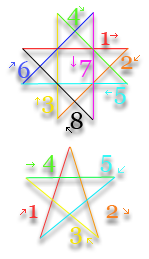
Crosses of Lietuvēns: Auseklis (above) and the pentagram (below) had to be drawn without lifting one's hand.

Auseklis is also the name of the eight-pointed star (an isogonal octagram). It is also known as one of the crosses of Lietuvēns (a malevolent spirit). The other cross of Lietuvēns is the pentagram, which symbolizes Venus in other cultures, suggesting that both signs might have originally been symbols of Auseklis. In more modern times, the pentagram is sometimes seen as a symbol of evil, however, originally both signs were used for protection from evil and are named after Lietuvēns because they were used to ward it off. Both signs had to be drawn without lifting the hand to ensure that protection was effective.

In the 1980s, the octagram became the symbol of the third Latvian National Awakening.

== Gallery ==
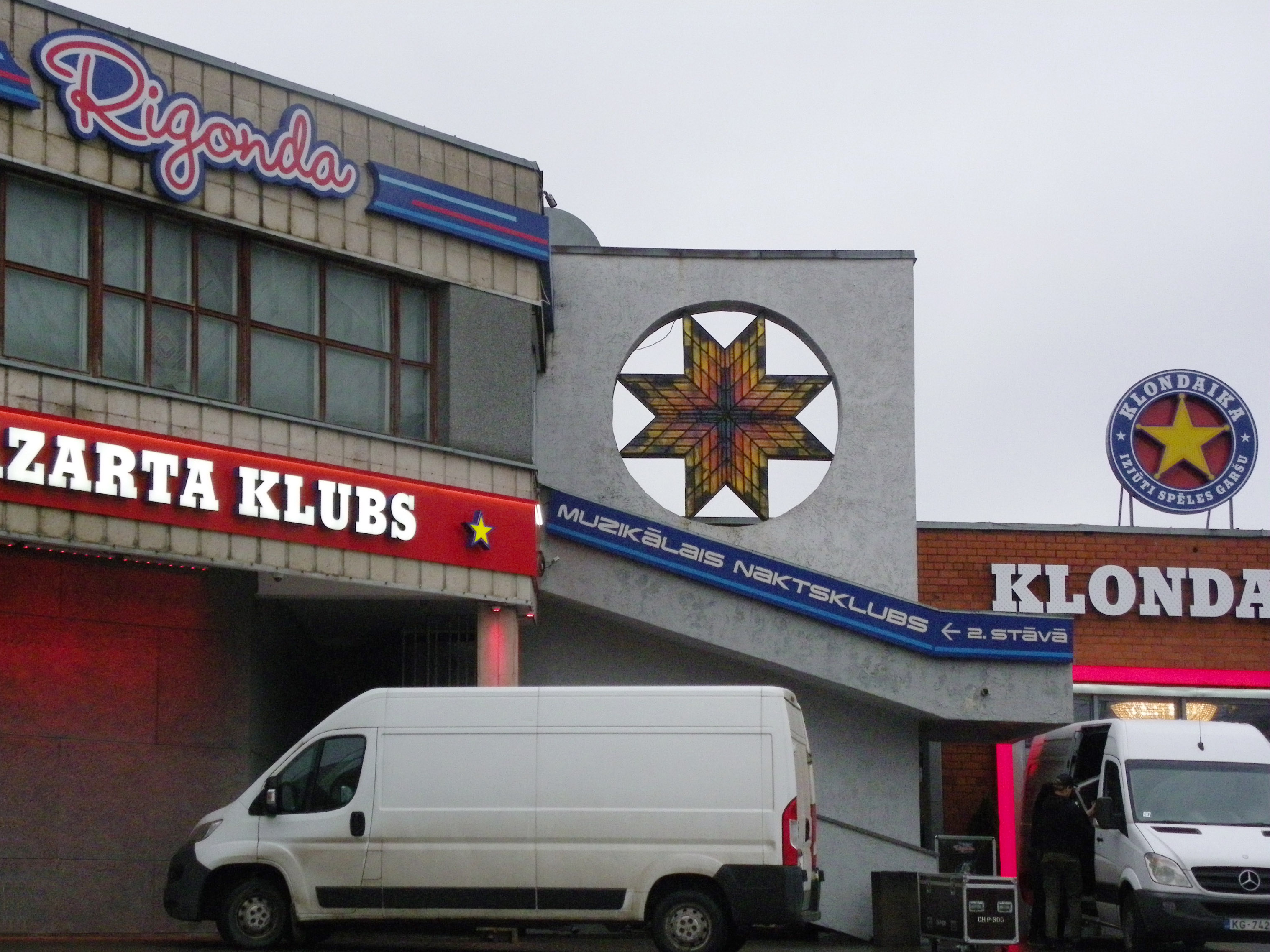
An auseklis ornament on the facade of the Minska Shopping Center in Riga, Latvia

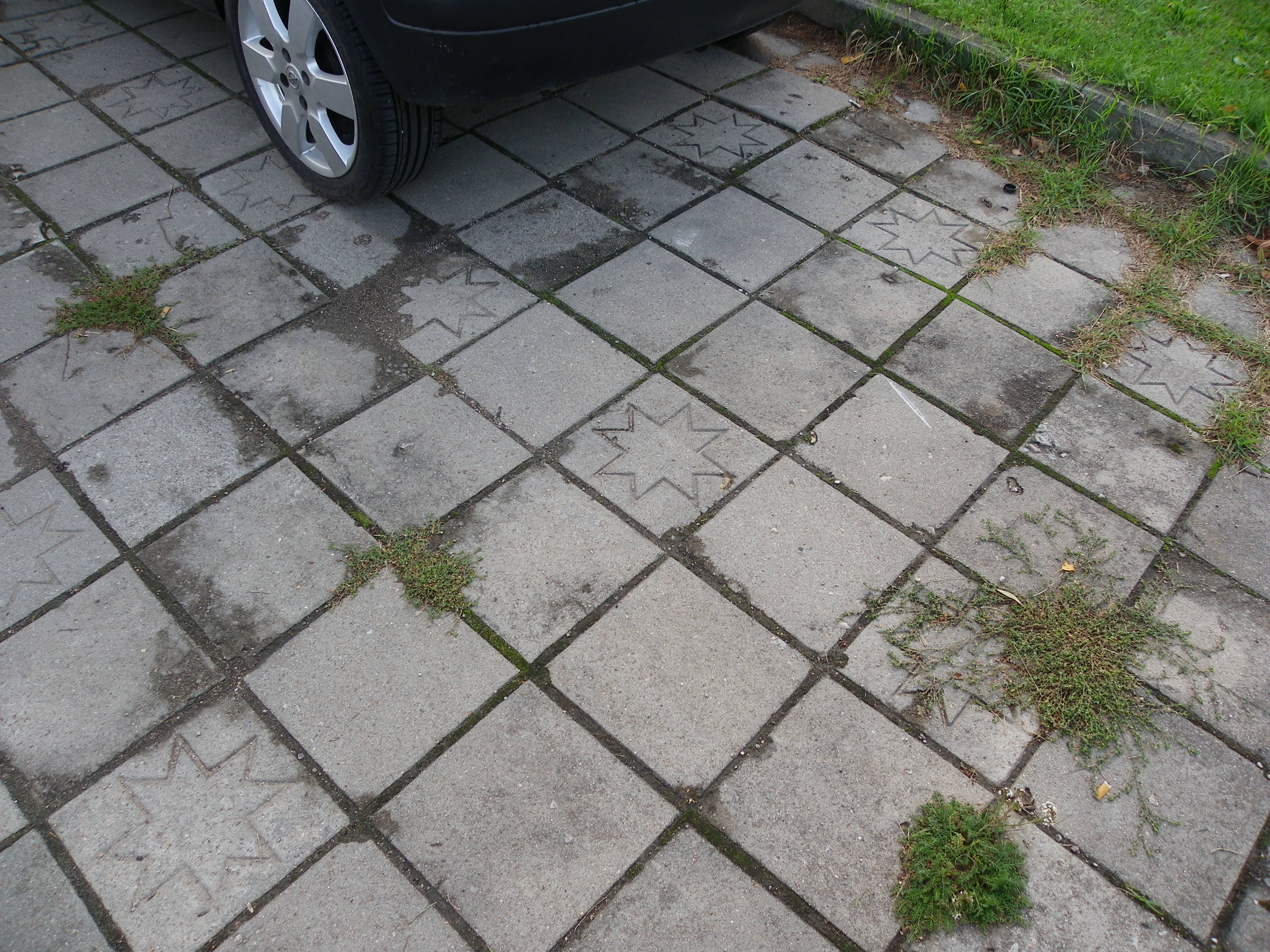
Street tiles featuring the symbol

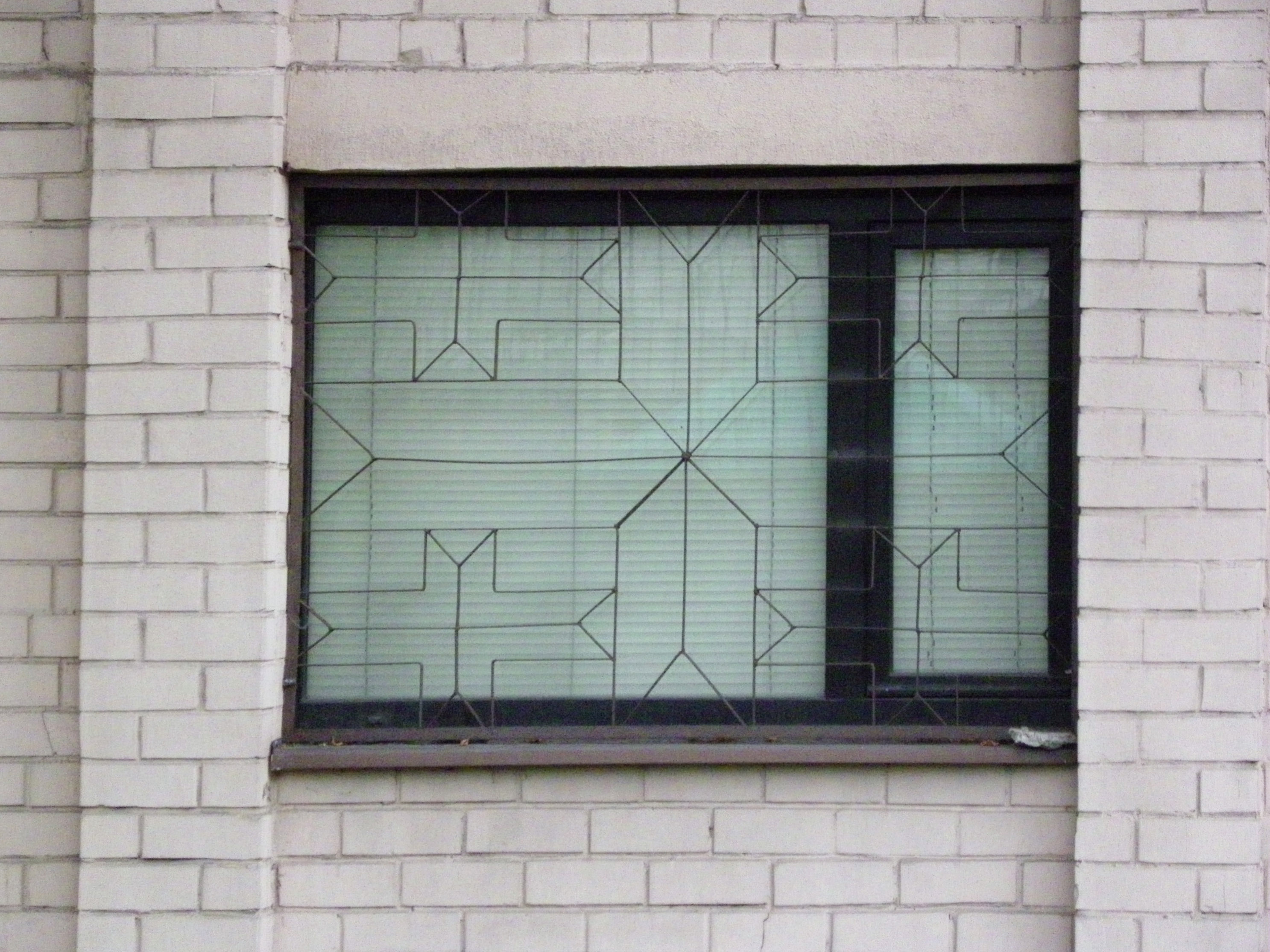
Window bar design in Riga

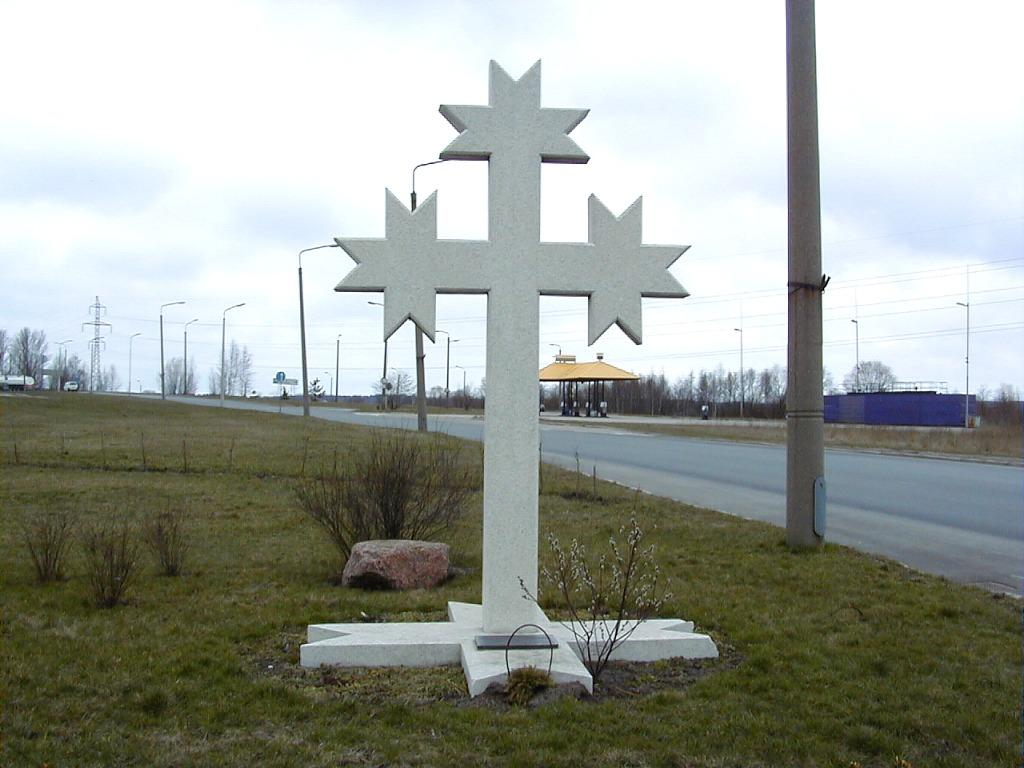
The monument to Roberts Mūrnieks features an auseklis cross

An auseklis on the coat of arms of the former Aloja Municipality

The emblem of the Latvian National Guard, featuring an auseklis

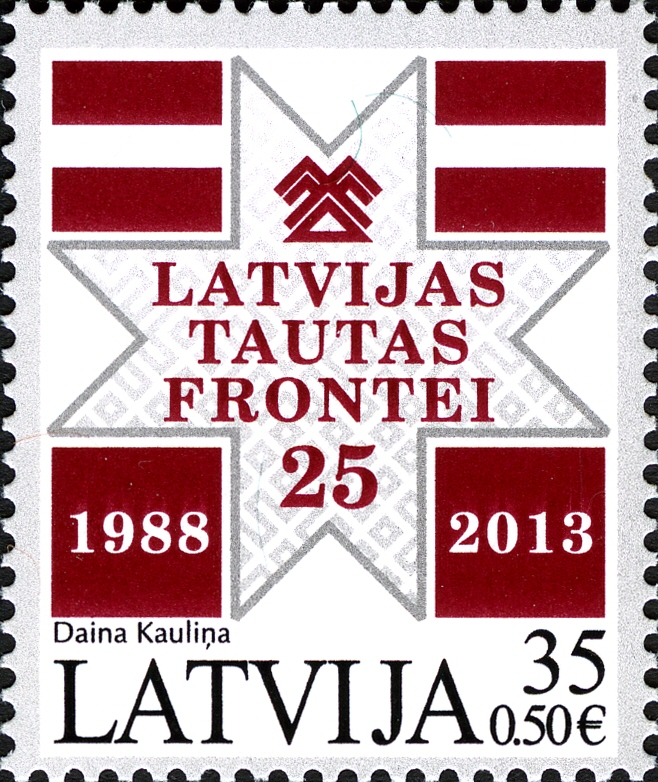
A stamp conmemorating the 25th anniversary of the Popular Front of Latvia

== See also ==
- Aušrinė
- Triquetra
