= Miķeļi =

Latvian autumn festival

Miķeļi ([miceʎi]) or Miķeļdiena is a Latvian autumn equinox and annual harvest festival and market. Latvian Miķeļi dainas referred to good and rich husbands as bread fathers, who are associated with the autumn harvest ripening. In different regions, the Miķeļi celebration was also called Mīkaļiem or Mīklāli, but it is also known to other households as Sila Miķelis, Miega Miķelis, and Miega Mača. According to an old calendar, this holiday is celebrated around autumn equinox time (around 21–23 September), when the duration of night is same as the duration of day.

The Latvian name of this holiday is Apjumības or Appļāvības, because this day was the last one when grains could have been harvested. A characteristic Miķeļdiena pagan ritual was finding Jumis, through which farmers sought to ensure the fertility of the fields in the coming year. The Miķeļi's house was considered to be pine forest's sandy soils, since he expressed his protection to gatherers of forest's riches.

== Title ==
Miķeļdiena name is derived from a name of an honorable Christian archangel Michael, whose day is celebrated during the autumn solstice time. In Latvian mythology, it gradually replaced a time to celebrate the autumn equinox of Apjumības or Appļāvības, which was the last harvest day, which with the help of magic rituals sought to ensure the success next year and to obtain the favor of Jumis.

== Holiday traditions ==
=== Collecting Jumis ===
According to ancient beliefs, cereals farmers lived with fertility deity Jumis and only with the owner, in whose cereals dwelt Jumis, growing fine bread. Therefore, they had to always leave a tithe of grains, to placate Jumis and so that he would not leaves the fields forever, since if only once one field is left without a grain patch, Jumis will become upset and he will never return.

When on Miķeļi a family solemnly went to mow the last field, all of the mowers reaped grain from all sides toward the middle of the fields, where they left a small bundle of cereal. It is tied in a knot and is used for magical activities, believing, that Jumis is hiding in there. Sometimes a bundle is tied in the form of the roof, dug the ground on Jumis roots, and dug out worms and insects, who were below the last sheaf, calling upon Jumīšus. If insects, who appeared at the excavation, hastily fled back to where they came from, then it meant that the future will be all good. Similarly, it was the same with mice, frogs and other critters escaping from the last sheaf, since they were considered to be the creatures of Jumis.

During the harvest, the collected Jumīšus (one stalk with two spikes fused together) were gathered and woven into a crown or a belt. Jumis' crown was usually carried to the receiver's home and put on the landlady's head, while a sowed belt was put around the landlord's waist. The found Jumīšus was brought home, and inserted into built-in slot and was stored all winter. It was believed, that only the house owner will receive the variety of benefits, while Jumis finders will still be the same after autumn. In other rituals every mowers flung their scythes over left shoulder. Whose scythe was thrown furthest, that worker will be married.

=== Feast ===
On Miķeļi people usually sacrificed a ram, goat or piglet, which were fed particularly on this day and called upon Miķeļi. The hostess of the holiday feast baked a special loaf of Jumis bread. It mentioned in the description, that the landlord took grains from each type of seeding cereal to make malt beer. Latvian dainas also mention Miķeļi as a celebration of beer employer. Since Miķeļi falls into the most opulent season, the feast table on that day is full of food. Miķeļi is a time of feast, chanting and singing about Jumis, and flower giving, while also each dish was given to Houses gods, before they could eat themselves.

=== Betting and proposing ===
During Jumis catching unmarried maidens observed insects, who were believed to be an embodiment of natural fertility. If the found beetle was beautiful, then maidens believed they would have a beautiful husband. Miķeļi was the last summer day, when men sought for maidens to woo and did drinking bets. After Miķeļi the proposing had to be postponed for another year.

=== Sacrificial rituals ===
Since the Miķeļdiena began the veļu laiks (Time of the Dead), farmers donated wax, butter, bread, cheese, meat, wool, and money on Miķeļi day. In 1570, the Duchy of Courland's church enforced the law of collecting, and taught how to look, in order for Latvian farmers to not practice "soul feast" (referred in text as 'Dwessel Meley') from Miķeļi till All Saints' Day. It also prohibited the sacrifice of wax, candle, wool, chicken, egg, butter etc. Miķeļdiena, similar to Jurģi, the time of spring solstice, repeated rooster sacrifice and greased the stable door with blood, in order for evil spirits to never enter the stables, and only the holy Miķeļi could.

== Miķeļi traditions in Latvian dainas ==
Miķelīt, father's brother,
Living on the edge of sandy soils:
If rye, barley did not grow,
Grow good slabs of firewood.
30673

Oh you Sila Miķelīti,
Your sweet beer!
Three grains, six barrels,
Through the roots distilled.
33234

I've baked a loaf,
In the middle carved a hole;
I sup with Miķelīti
With a holey loaf.
54305-16

Three Miķeļi drums are located
On the gate's pole tip;
Come, daughters, look,
Where bread fathers are located.
54316-16

Miķelītis' good little man,
That dark grey kilt;
Better a dark grey skirt
Than a white cap.
54315-192

Mīkālīts' rich man,
That came with boots;
Following such period
Came to visit willow.
54309-490

Mīkāls is behind the gate,
Wearing a velvet skirt.
Come, Mīkāls, into a closet,
Sit at the table's tip.
30059

All day Jumi leads
Over large fields.
There leads, there receive
By a large stone,
By a large stone,
In the middle of a field.
1887

I didn't sleep on Jāņi night,
My upright roses grow;
My upright roses blossom,
Until Miķeļiem itself.
Miķelīša is scrolling
Tassel national colt’
54254

Miķelim slaughtered roosters
With nine crests,
For it is my new year
Brought up rye and barley.
33236

Miķelītis swarmed chicks,
Scurrying alongside fire
Flow, Līzīte, bring firewood,
Get' delicious nibble.
54310-431

Miķelim slaughtered roosters
With red legs,
In order to see a foal
Without a campion feed.
54311-166

Heat milk, mommy,
Miķielītis went plowing,
Miķielītis went plowing,
To find a land frozen.
54314-373

Maidens wait for Miķeļdienas
As the sun rises;
What vellu (veli) waits for-
Miķeļdiena to be gone?
54308-90

== Miķeļi traditions in other countries ==
Medieval Catholic traditional archangel Michael was the soldier's guardian. Miķeļi Day is mostly celebrated by Northern European people. Germans call this celebration Michaelis or Michaeli, Englishmen call it Michaelmas, Swedes - Mickelsmäss, Danes - Mikkelsdag, Norwegians - Mikkelsmess, Finns - Mikkelinpäivä, while Estonians call it Mihklipäev.

Since the Middle Ages up to the 18th century, this festival served as a tax deadline and lease payment. The traditional festive meal that day was a roasted goose.
