= Mārtiņi =

Latvian holiday

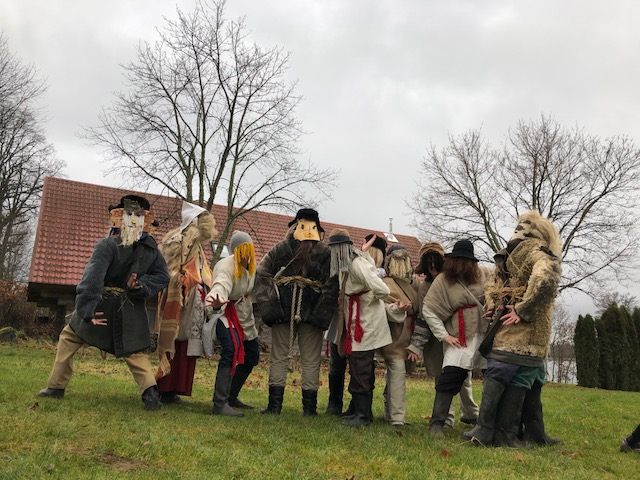
A Mārtiņi mumming group consisting of participants from folklore group "Rudzupuķe" and Latvian world-view society "Saulesrits", November 25, 2017

Mārtiņi ([mɑːrt̪iɲi]) or Mārtiņdiena is an ancient Latvian winter welcoming holiday, when the time of pieguļa and shepherding came to an end. According to a solar calendar, Mārtiņdiena marks the midpoint between the autumnal equinox (Miķeļi) and winter solstice (Ziemassvētki), and is celebrated in the middle of November. Mārtiņi ended Veļu laiks (Time of the Dead) and started Ledus laiks (Time of Ice), when the swamp became passable and raids of armed men sitting on horses were expected.

== Relationship with St. Martin's cult ==
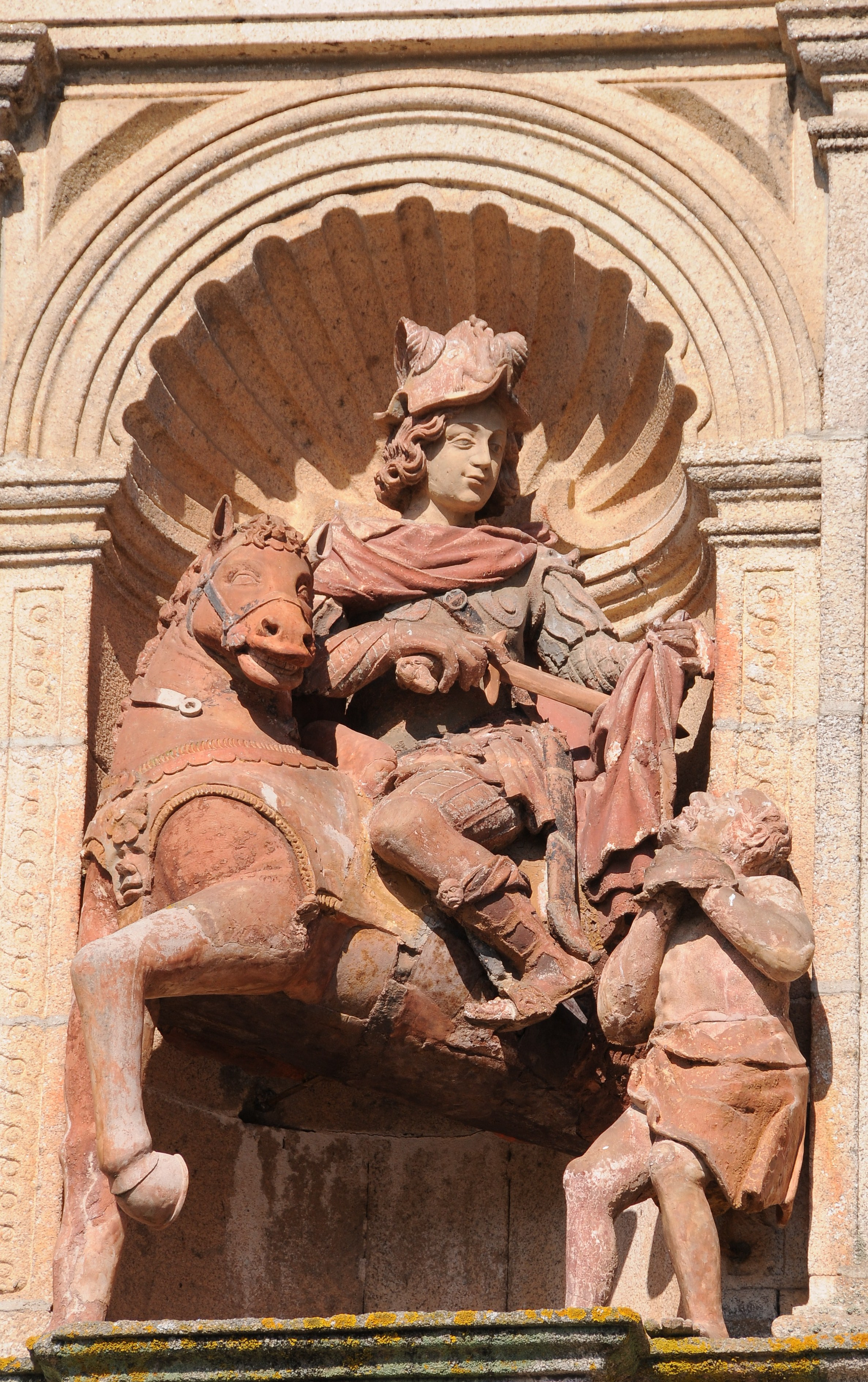
Saint Martin cuts off part of his cloak for a poor man suffering from coldness. Sculpture of Braga's monastery.

The holiday has already acquired its name before the 16th century, during which happened the reformation of churches by Livonian Order's sacred memorial day in honor of a Roman soldier Martin (Martinus), who sat on the horse, offering his cloak to a poor man suffering from coldness. Then he learned through dreams, that it was Jesus himself. Christian legend tells, that Martin did not want to become a bishop and hid away in the poultry barn, however, the local church nationals meanwhile walked around and they discovered him because of poultry's noisiness. Therefore, the Latvian Mārtiņi beliefs and predictions are not only associated with horses and clothes, but also with poultry slaughter and Children of Mārtiņi march.

== Mārtiņi traditional legends ==
=== Prediction with clothes ===
"Maidens on Mārtiņi's Eve have to throw a skirt in the middle of the room before going to sleep; who picks it up it in a dream will marry." "On Mārtiņi's Eve all clothes which were worn on that day, must be left on the floor; who picks them up during the night will be the right mate."

=== Rooster slaughter ===
In the evening, before Mārtiņi, in honor of stables they sacrificed a rooster, believing that would prevent horses from catching a disease in the winter. Pēteris Šmits's compiled "Latvian folk beliefs" found in following ancient ritual descriptions:

"[..]The landlord took a rooster, brought it to the horse stables, stopped in front of one horse and bypassed the rooster around the horse in circles, towards the sun, instead of along the sun. Once it was done to every horses, who were located in the stable, then the landlord killed the rooster, holding it over a bushel of oats and nearly drenching it with blood. These oats with blood were poured into a manger, from which every horses got to eat. With rooster's bloody head and neck the stable's jamb and lintel were smeared, and drew a cross on the floor. [..]" (1832) "On Mārtiņvakarā, they took a loaf of bread and went to the horse stable. There they slaughtered a rooster and with its blood tarnished the left hind leg of each horse. After that a loaf of bread with the rooster were carried around horses, then the horses would not be smitten with evil spirits and their random incubus."

=== Children of Mārtiņi walking around ===
On Mārtiņi mask marches helped with Mārtiņi's healing and pedestrians with Mārtiņi's children or mārtiņiem: "On Mārtiņi Eve the youth dressed up and walked around asking for gifts, which then all together were poured." (1781) "On Mārtiņi Eve the Mārtiņi children chased Mārtiņi with sticks." If Children of Mārtiņi flogged someone from home team, then do not run away under the bed, because then all his life a man will be fearful." "On Mārtiņi Eve, men went through the village, dressed in clipped fur coats as someone from evil side and girded with belts of braided straw, and also stuck a tail to buttocks; they went to frighten children, in order to make them learn and listen to their parents." (1852)

== Mārtiņi traditions in Latvian dainas ==
That Mārtiņš, here comes,
Trousers hang from an oak;
Black crows, run over:
Who hanged those rags?
20662

Mārtiņš loitered upright
In my stable's rear.
Fed, brushed,
Sits on the trough's tip.
30209–1

Muortiņam swarmed roosters
With red caps;
Me pursued after campion,
To feed a co'lt.
30218–422

Mārtiņš drove here,
Drove away,
Hanged a coat
On a blades's end.
30222

Yesterday Mārtiņš
Fled from Riga,
Today in courtyard
Drove inside.
Nine carts,
Hundred foals,
Three hundred servants,
Armed men.
30230

Mārtiņš arrived,
Drove here,
Hanged a coat
On a gateway's snag.
Mārtiņš left,
Drove off,
Carried away a coat
On a sword's end.
33242

== Mārtiņdiena traditions in other countries ==
Traditions of Mārtiņi Day are known by many citizens of European countries. Germans call this celebration Martinstag, Englishmen call it Martinmas, Swedish - Mårtensafton, Danes - Mortensdag, Finns - Martinpäivä, while Estonians call it Mardipäev. Since Middle Ages, this holiday is associated with the horse cult and knight traditions. In Austria, Germany and Netherlands, on Mārtiņi Eve happens a solemn children processions with candles and lanterns. The traditional festive meal on this day is a roasted goose.
