= Pieguļa =

Pieguļa ([pieguʎa]; in Latvia) or naktigonė (in Lithuania) was an ancient tradition of grazing common types of horses during night, that existed about until the early 20th century. After winter, the grazing horses were released on their own for the first time, while under the shepherds (pieguļnieki) supervision. Several khutor guys often rode to pieguļa together, who stayed overnight at grazing along with their horses. This was necessary because horses were threatened by wolves and thieves. Pieguļnieki lit and fueled bonfires and sang a lot. They slept right beside the bonfire on needles, twigs, or brought their own straw sacks. During rainy periods they often brought twig huts. In Latvia first pieguļa usually coincidences with Ūsiņš Day and people ate a special food called Pantāga (Pantāgs) by the bonfire, but people could ride to pieguļa until Mārtiņi.

In Latvia pieguļa started to disappear in the second half of the 19th century, starting with Courland and Vidzeme, but in Latgale this tradition was maintained until the 1930s.

Pieguļa riding was also linked with a wide range of folklore layers, innumerable folk songs and beliefs. The passage of pieguļa period was surrounded with a peculiar, romantic aura. Different periods were entirely described poetically and imaginatively by many Latvian writers (e.g. J. Jaunsudrabiņš White Book).
