= Baltic mythology =

Baltic mythology is the body of mythology of the Baltic peoples stemming from Baltic paganism and continuing after Christianization and into Baltic folklore.

== History ==
Baltic mythology ultimately stems from Proto-Indo-European mythology. The Baltic region was one of the last regions of Europe to be Christianized, a process that began in the 15th century and continued for at least a century afterward. While no native texts survive detailing the mythology of the Baltic peoples during the pagan period, knowledge of such beliefs may be gained from Roman and German chronicles, from later folklore, from etymology and from the reconstructions of comparative mythology.

While the early chronicles (14th and 15th century) were largely the product of missionaries who sought to eradicate the native paganism of the Baltic peoples, rich material survives into Baltic folklore. This material has been of particular value in Indo-European studies as, like the Baltic languages, it is considered by scholars to be notably conservative, reflecting elements of Proto-Indo-European religion. The Indo-European Divine Twins are particularly well represented as the Dieva dēli (Latvian 'sons of god') and Dievo sūneliai (Lithuanian 'sons of god'). According to folklore, they are the children of Dievas (Lithuanian and Latvian - see Proto-Indo-European *Dyeus). Associated with the brothers and their father are two goddesses; the personified Sun, Saule (Latvian and Lithuanian 'sun') and Saules meita (Latvian 'Sun's daughter').

== See also ==
- Latvian mythology
- Lithuanian mythology
- Prussian mythology
- Celestial wedding in Baltic folklore
- Baltic neopaganism
- Romuva (religion)
