= Dieva Dēli =

Latvian heavenly beings

The Dieva Dēli (Latvian: 'Sons of Dievs') are heavenly beings depicted as the sons of the sky-god Dievs in Latvian mythology.

== Origin ==
The Dieva Dēli are generally regarded as a reflex of the Indo-European Divine Twins. The Latvian name Dieva Dēli ('Sons of Dievs', the sky-god) is indeed comparable with the Lithuanian expression Dievo sūneliai ('sons of Dievas'), referring to the Ašvieniai, with the Vedic divó nápātā ('grandsons of Dyaús'), attached to the Aśvins, and with the Greek Diós-kouroi ('boys of Zeus'), designating Castor and Pollux. However, evidence of the depiction of the Dieva Dēli as twins is lacking. Although they are usually two, in some Latvian sources, there are three of them. In other dainas (folk songs), the Dieva Dēli are reduced to one son of Dievs.

== Theme ==
Like the Vedic Aśvins, the Dieva Dēli are portrayed as the suitors of the Saules Meitas, the 'Daughters of the Sun'. The Latvian dainas tell how the Dieva Dēli set them and the Sun (Saule) free with the help of their father Dievs. A recurrent theme in Latvian sources is the rescue of the sinking Sun from the sea by the Dieva Dēli who row to save her in their golden boat.

They are also said to mow the heavenly pastures on which the Saules Meitas rake up the hay, and to pour water on the heated stones of the heavenly bath-house. Furthermore, the Dieva Dēli appear as part of the cosmological myth of the "celestial wedding" that involves other heavenly deities (Meness, Saule, Saules Meitas) as well.

== Bibliography ==
=== Primary sources ===
- Jonval, Michel (1929). Les chansons mythologiques lettonnes. Librarie Picart. OCLC 7012710.

=== References ===
- Ankrava, Lisbeth (2014). "Baltic Religion". In Bredholt Christensen; Hammer, Olav; Warburton, David (eds.). The Handbook of Religions in Ancient Europe. Routledge. ISBN 978-1-317-54453-1.
- Lurker, Manfred (2004). The Routledge Dictionary of Gods and Goddesses, Devils and Demons. Routledge. ISBN 978-0-415-34018-2.
- Mallory, James P.; Adams, Douglas Q. (1997). Encyclopedia of Indo-European Culture. Fitzroy Dearborn. ISBN 978-1-884964-98-5.
- West, Martin L. (2007). Indo-European Poetry and Myth. Oxford University Press. ISBN 978-0-19-928075-9.
