= Pantāga =

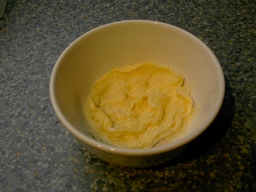
Pantāga

Pantāga (pantāgs, pentogs) is a traditional Latvian dish, containing eggs and spices. It symbolically represents the sun as is prepared during Ūsiņš Day, and often at Easter. Occasionally pantāgs was also used for sacrifice rituals and holy sites in Latvian pre-Christian rituals. It is often baked on an open flame outdoor fireplace or fire, usually in a round cast iron long stem pan. The egg whites and yolks are beaten in a pan with spices, producing a form of scrambled egg. However, it is also common to place it in a microwave.
