= Easter in Latvia =

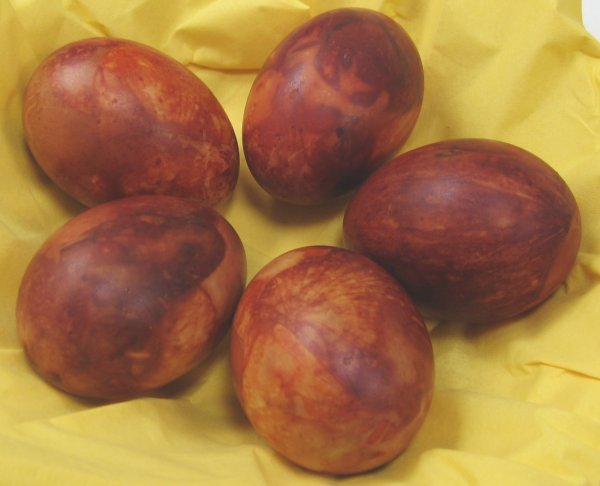
Lieldienas eggs

The Christian festival of Easter is celebrated in Latvia as Lieldienas ([lield̪ien̪as̪]). Lieldienas enters Holy Week with Palm Sunday, Maundy Thursday, Good Friday and Holy Saturday, but Sunday will mark first Lieldienas. Second Lieldienas is on Monday of the following week. Each day has a special significance. Also, many pagan elements of celebrating Lieldienas have become a tradition.

== Lieldienas dates ==
Lieldienas celebration dates recent and coming years
Year	Western Christians	Orthodox
2004	11 April	
2005	27 March	1 May
2006	16 April	23 April
2007	8 April	
2008	23 March	27 April
2009	12 April	19 April
2010	4 April	
2011	24 April	
2012	8 April	15 April
2013	31 March	5 May
2014	20 April	
2015	5 April	12 April
2016	27 March	1 May
2017	16 April	
2018	1 April	8 April

Nowadays, the common date of Lieldienas is the first Sunday after the first full moon, after or during the [[S[ equinox]]. Thus, the Western Christian Church Lieldienas falls on a date between 22 March and 25 April. In Eastern Orthodox Churches, which used the Julian calendar, Lieldienas falls on a date between 4 April and 8 May in Gregorian calendar.

== Latvian customs of celebrating Lieldienas ==
Before the arrival of Christianity, Lieldienas was a spring equinox event, celebrating the victory of light over darkness.

Although dainas have no conclusive indication of egg painting tradition in ancient times, the majority of them mention golden, silver and white eggs. Latvians today paint Easter eggs, In order for eggs to be diverse, they were boiled with colorful cloth. In one area, grits are poured in, while in other, people added colorful birch leaves, fir needles, cells, a variety of flowers, herbs or just reel them with a colorful yarn. Every family has a different way of following this tradition. Children ride on swings, with their families encouraging them to swing as high as possible for fun and for good luck in the harvest. There are songs sung especially for the occasion. Families also often hold an Easter feast, with traditional foods and cakes served.
