= Ūsiņš =

Latvian deity

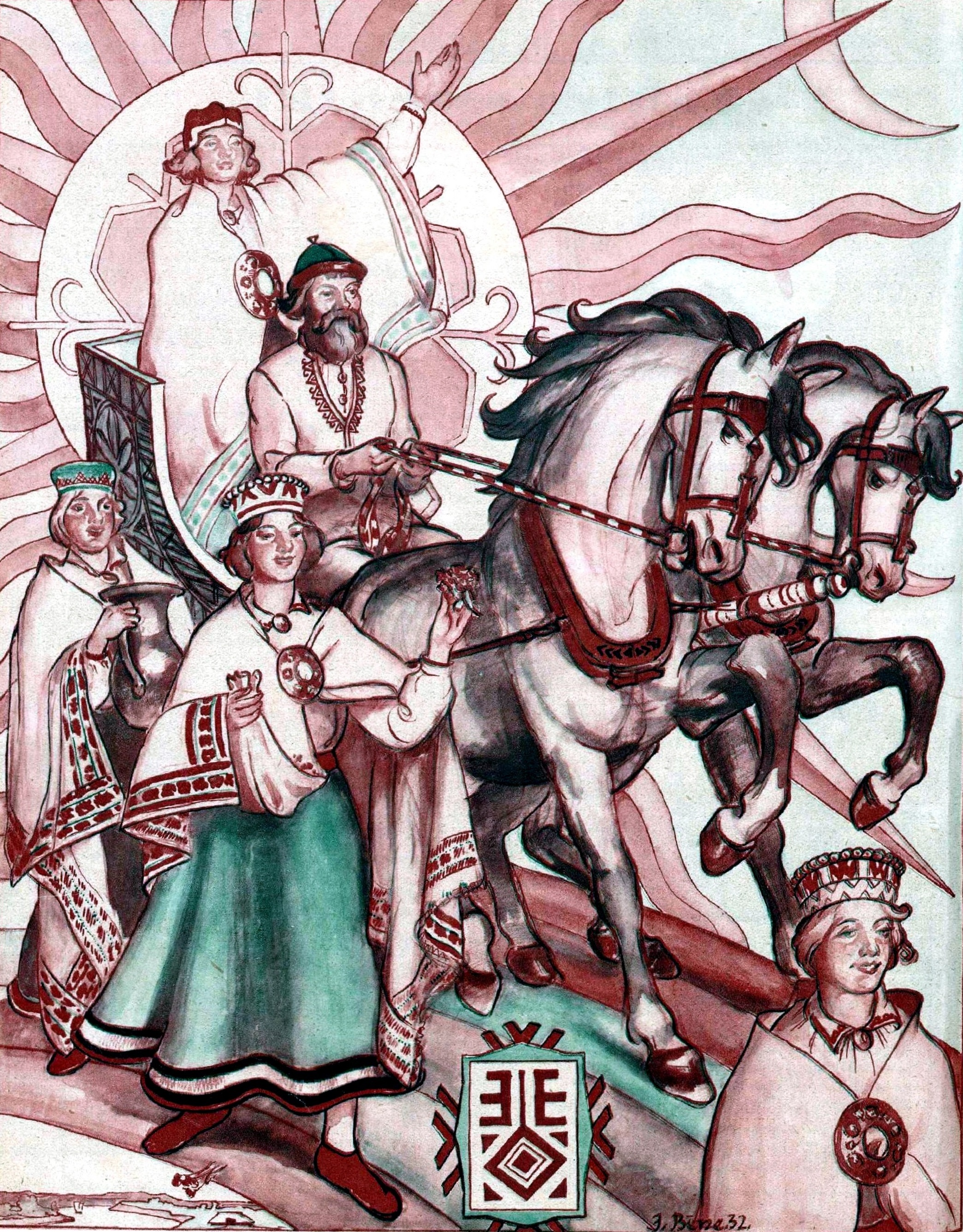
Sun Bearer Ūsiņš, by Jēkabs Bīne, 1934

Ūsiņš ([uːs̪iɲʃ]) is a deity in Latvian mythology, the god of light and spring, symbol of fertility, guardian of horses and bees.

It is one of few Latvian deities whose historical sources can be derived to be more or less genuine testimony. With Ūsiņš Day begins summer: as they bestow fields with green grass and trees with green leaves. Therefore on Ūsiņi men would drive horses to pieguļa for the first time. Ūsiņi coincidences with Jurģi on 23 April (in Gregorian calendar Ūsiņi falls on 9 May), which is the Christian Church's deposit. Ūsiņš has its own ornamental sign, which is similar to two letter E facing their backs against each other. This sign is the most common ornament for gloves. There is a belief, that such gloves grant the wearer with good luck on the road, and such gloves are called atslēgaiņi.

The most important symbol of Ūsiņš Day is a foal, which can be interpreted differently. It is both the power of Dievas, human energy, and a phallic symbol because sexual power is equal to the creative energy. Yellow foal symbolizes energy from the Sun. With Ūsiņš it is also linked to someone else's image – the golden grass snake, which in turn, a snake is a symbol of energy flow.

== Etymology ==
The word "ūsiņš" offers several explanations. Gotthard Friedrich Stender linked that name with ūzām – 'trousers', which are of a yellow color. Stender also called Ūsiņš a bee god. However, there is conflicting data on Ūsiņš being a bee god. 19th century folklore materials called Ūziņš a bee god, while a horse god – Ūsiņš.

In late 19th century R. Auniņš called Ūsiņš the god of light, by explaining with the sound "us", which can also be found in the word aust ('day'). Also, in his study on Latvian deity Ūsiņš, Haralds Biezais concluded that Ūsiņš typologically belongs to the realm of heavenly deities, and the specific features allowed him to be considered as the god of light. Similarly, Jonas Balys was inclined to compare his name with deities Auseklis and Austra, derived from stem aust-. If this interpretation is correct, he is therefore an astral deity connected to the morning and the evening star.

On the other hand, Jānis Endzelīns felt that the word ūsiņš has no Latvian origin, but was borrowed from the Germanic word husing ('home spirit'). After some time, Endzelīns reflected on and considered that the word ūsiņš derives from a Russian word усень or овсень and that the same deity was borrowed from Russian people. Lastly, Vladimir Toporov, in his studies concluded that Ūsiņš was an ancient and mythical deity of several nations.

== Parallels ==
Folk songs expressed a visible merging process of Ūsiņš and Jurģi (Saint George). According to older writings, Jurģi Day (April 23) was also known as Ūsiņš Day, which were mainly related to the beginning of the spring work, resuming to shepherd livestock and pieguļa.

Ūsiņš also shows similarities with the Indian deities Ashvini and is therefore also comparable with Greek Dioskouri or "Sons of Zeus", who like Ūsiņš transport the Sun. A further parallel is that Ūsiņš is also known as Son of Dievs, and both Asvins are described as Divo napata ("Sons of Dyaus").

== Ūsiņš Day celebration ==
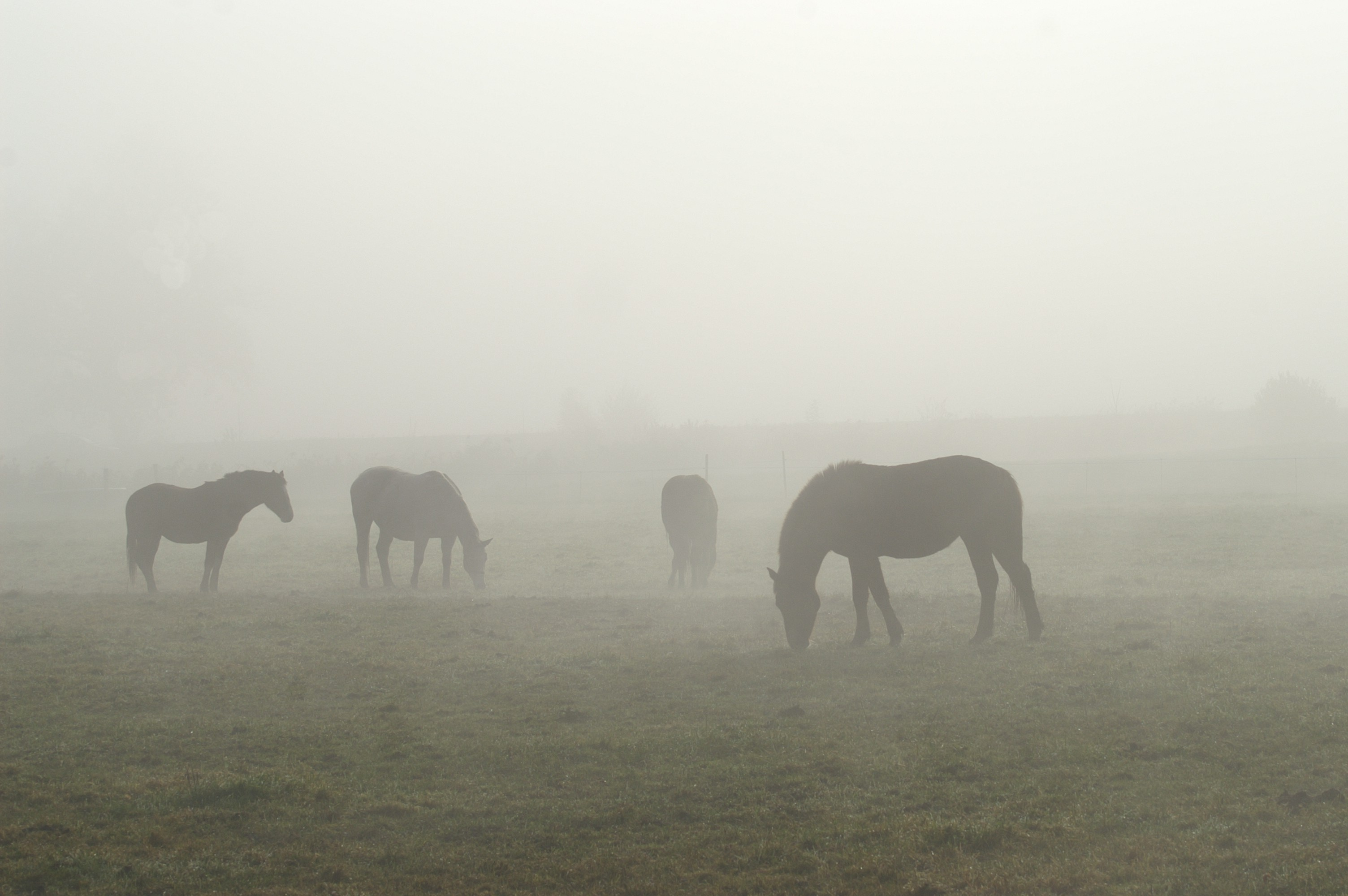
On Ūsiņš Day horses are released for the first pieguļa after winter.

Farmers fully entrust their horses to Ūsiņš, handing them over under his guardianship. Folk songs mention, that Ūsiņš himself belongs to horses, moreover, they are very well cared for. Since Ūsiņš is the god of light, it was horses that transported the sun. An important place in descriptions of traditions is paid to a sacrifice. A black cock with nine crests and red legs is sacrificed to Ūsiņš. Rooster's blood was drained in horse's manger directly on oats. There was a belief, that blood, which is given to Ūsiņš, blessed the beast's home. Later during pieguļa the rooster is cooked and eaten by pieguļnieki. During pieguļa eggs are boiled and cooked into a special Ūsiņi dish – pantāga. Ūsiņš Day was held on horse market day when they were bought and sold. Ūsiņš Day was met with a rumble and great noisiness, which ties in with spring thunder nature.

== Ūsiņš in Latvian dainas ==
Ūsiņš of Horses,
Māršaviņa of Cows,
Barbiņa of Goats,
Teniss of Pigs,
Annīte of Sheep,
Urbans of Calves,
Protect my beasts
From pestilence, from wolves!
29202

Ūsiņš stands by a fence,
Waiting, to ask for a room.
Come, Ūsiņ, to the room,
Sit at the table's tip.
30059-2

Ūsiņam slaughtered roosters
With nine crests,
To grow me cows bulls
With nine layers.
30060

To the hill Ūsiņš rode
With a stone foal;
He brought leaves to the trees,
Green clover to the land.
30063

Ūsiņš rode a good horse,
It is I who made a good ride;
Envious ones, do not travel
Along my halter.
30081

Ūsiņš rode to pieguļâ
With nine foals.
I asked you, brother Ūsiņ,
To give me a horse over the road.
30082

Ūsiņš rode to pieguļâ,
With thieves on the road's edge.
Ūsiņam high horses,
Thieves higher gallows.
30083
