= Latvian mythology =

Latvian mythology is the collection of myths that have emerged throughout the history of Latvia, sometimes being elaborated upon by successive generations, and at other times being rejected and replaced by other explanatory narratives. These myths, for the most part, likely stem from Proto-Indo-European practices and the later folk traditions of the Latvian people and pre-Christian Baltic mythology.

Latvian mythology is used particularly as a tool for reconstructing and analysing the historical pagan beliefs and national identity of Latvia.

The minute details of most, if not all of these myths vary from region to region, and sometimes even from family to family.

== History ==
=== 13th–18th century ===
Territories of Baltic tribes at beginning of the 13th century. Early research sought to restore pagan religion practiced at the time.

There are few accounts of Baltic tribes, the ancestors of modern Latvians, and their mythology prior to their Christianization in the 13th century. Following Christianization, a variety of sources of information concerning indigenous mythology become available, including chronicles, travel reports, visitation records, Jesuit reports and other accounts of pagan practices. These sources are considered secondary by researchers because, since the authors were not Latvian, they did not speak the local languages and were often biased. These materials can be unreliable, containing errors, distortions and even outright fabrications - these stemming from the Christian world-view of their creators. This said, data derived from early accounts can often be substantiated by judicious comparisons made with motifs and themes present in folklore collected in successive centuries.

=== 18th – early 20th century ===
Most folklore materials have been collected since the mid-19th century. In the 18th and 19th centuries, it was assumed that Baltic tribes were originally one nation and thus had the same deities. Early authors tried to reconstruct a Latvian pantheon using data from neighboring regions. This trend was later also adopted by Latvian national romanticists. After the abolition of serfdom, a new national identity was forming and authors sought to prove that Baltic cultural traditions were as deep as those of other nations. It was hoped that a grand epic could be constructed using pieces preserved in folklore. It was also thought that the ancient religion, forgotten during 700 years of oppression, could be reconstructed. However, folklore sources proved insufficient for the task. Some attempted to reconstruct pantheons to be as impressive as that of Greek mythology, which led to some deities being simply invented. Besides the assumption that deities of other Baltic peoples must be Latvian as well but were simply lost over time, many new deities were modeled after Greek and Roman deities. An example of the trend is the epic poem Lāčplēsis by Andrejs Pumpurs, which features a pantheon of Latvian and Prussian gods and some the author has invented himself. Similarly, works of Juris Alunāns and poet Miķelis Krogzemis feature pantheons of invented deities.

At the same time, some pagan rites were still practiced. And, as Christianity was seen as alien, attempts were made to recreate the ancient religion. The most successful of the neopagan movements was Dievturi, established in the late 1920s, which claims that ancient Latvians were monotheistic and the various mythological beings are all aspects of one God. While the notion of needing to remove alien influences to reconstruct Latvian traditions was preserved into later times, the attempts to create an Olympus-like pantheon of pseudo-gods eventually stopped as national romanticism was replaced by realism and came to be criticized in the first half of 20th century. It was also suspected that some of the folklore materials might have been falsified. The research of this time is characterised not only by skepticism but also with attempts to seek foreign influences.

=== 1944–1970s ===
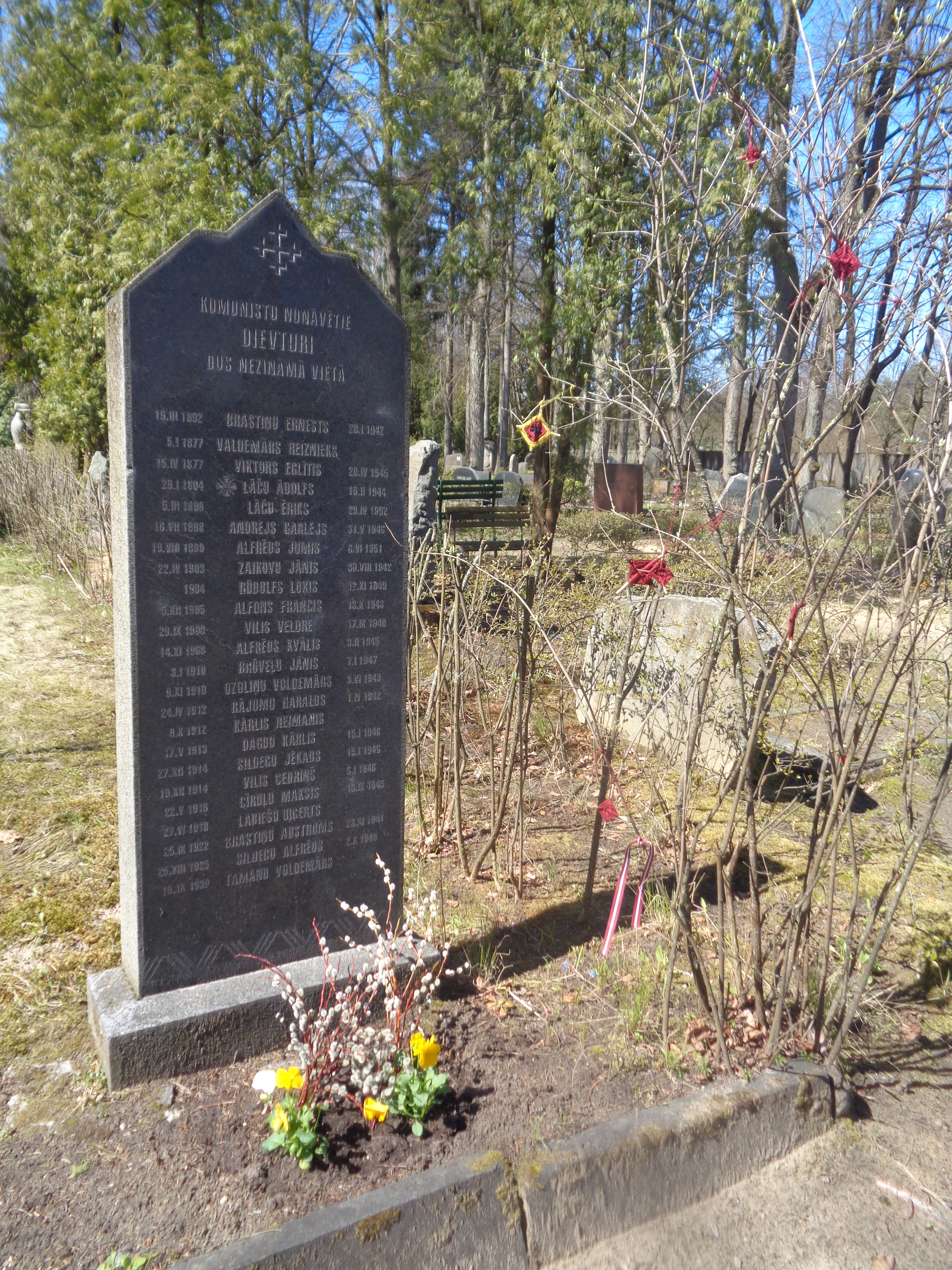
Memorial stone at the Forest Cemetery to the Latvian Dievturi killed by the Communists 1942–1952.

After the Soviet re-occupation of Latvia in 1944, research into mythology and especially religious concepts was banned in Latvia. Similarly, members of neopagan groups were persecuted as paganism was considered chauvinistic. Despite this, research was continued by Latvians in exile, who focused on the mythology of folk songs. The songs were already seen as the best source for mythology research during the interwar period. The reason was that since the need to preserve poetic metre and melody limited possible changes, it was thought that ancient notions were better preserved in them than in other genres of folklore. Accordingly, folk songs were the only source for research for a long time. This approach has been criticized by modern researchers who have proposed that themes mentioned in other genres, such as fairy tales, legends, and records of folk beliefs and magic practices, might complement folk songs as each genre contains different themes and might provide only partial insight into mythology.

=== 1970s–present ===
Although research in Latvia could only restart in the 1980s, the 1970s saw the emergence of a folklore movement with members that could be described as neopagans. These groups were pantheistic, less uniform, less dogmatic, interested in the protection of nature and cultural heritage, and more open to the influence of traditions from neighboring nations. Later, marginal movements have explored spirituality in both local traditions and religious and spiritual practices of the world, such as Eastern religions. For example, Pokaiņi Forest was announced to be an ancient sacral site by one of these groups in the late 1990s, and it attracts thousands of visitors each season. Dievturi, which resumed operating in Latvia just before the restoration of independence in 1990, is the only officially recognized pagan religion and had around 600 followers as of 2001. Given the decreasing influence of the movement, its name is sometimes applied in a broader sense to any modern practice related to folklore.

== Beings and concepts ==
=== Celestial deities ===
There are various reconstructions of Latvian mythical space, but most researchers agree on the meaning of certain features related to the sky. The sky itself is identified as Debeskalns ("Sky Mountain"). The sky is also referred to as Oļu kalns ("Mountain of Pebbles"), Sudraba kalns ("Silver Mountain") or Ledus kalns ("Ice Mountain"), with the adjectives, probably referring to stars or snow. It has also been suggested that Dievs (God) is also a symbol of the sky because the etymology of his name seems to be related to the sky. Dievs is considered to be the supreme deity. Another celestial deity is the goddess of the sun, Saule, whose name literally translates to "the sun", she ensured the fertility of the earth and was the guardian of the unlucky, especially for orphans and young shepherds. Her path leads her across the mountain of sky to the sea, which is sometimes interpreted as a symbolic representation of the sky or cosmic ocean. The sea and other bodies of water, including rivers, especially Daugava, seem to mark the boundary between worlds of the living and the dead. In Latvian, the word for "the world" is derived from the word for the Sun and these worlds are referred to as "this sun" and "that sun". Therefore, it seems that Saule is also closely related to the concept of death. She apparently carries the souls of the dead across the sea to the world of the dead. Her daily movement can thus be related to the cycle of human life with her being reborn every day.

On the path of the Sun, in or by the water, often on an island or rock in middle of the seas, is the Austras koks (tree of dawn) thought to represent world tree or axis mundi, it is usually described as a tree, but can also be variety of other plants or even objects. Nobody has ever seen the tree, although folklore purports that many have searched all their lives. Still it has been suggested that its natural counterpart might be the polar star or the Milky Way. It has also been proposed it might be a symbol for the year. The tree is related to celestial wedding mythos in which sun or her daughter is courted by Dieva dēli (sons of god), Auseklis (Venus) or Pērkons (Thunder).

Also, as in Latvian the word for daughter (meita) also stands for maiden, it is uncertain who exactly is getting married. However, this does not affect how mythical events transpire. The male deities spy on the solar deity at the world tree, prepare a bath for her, tease her and so on. Eventually, she is abducted and wed. Saule's husband is the moon god Mēness. Pērkons strikes the world tree, has weeping Saule pick up bits for three years and then reassembles them, finishing with the very tip, on the fourth year.

=== Afterlife ===
The world of the dead is called Aizsaule or Viņsaule ("The Other Sun", where the sun goes at night). (Note: The word Viņsaule denotes a "place on the other side", in opposition to "this world" where the sun shines. This opposition is marked by Latvian prefix viņš.) It is related to various mother deities (or perhaps one referred to by several names): Zemes māte (Mother of Earth), sometimes referred to as "Nāve", literally meaning "death"; Veļu māte (Mother of Wraiths), Kapu māte (Mother of Graves), and Smilšu māte (Mother of Sand). Zemes mate is portrayed as wearing a long robe in all white and occasionally has a scythe or sickle.

Jods (not to be confused with velni), the equivalent to Satan, is a being usually portrayed as being on par with other deities. Unlike velni, Jods is purely evil. He is said to have taken part in the creation of the world and living things. Jods steals people away to take them to his world. In this he is similar to other spirits who kill people, including Veļi who were believed to sometimes come back to claim a life of a person they knew in their lifetime. The dead - called Veļi (also Iļģi, Dieviņi, Pauri) - were considered to be visiting their old homes during autumn from Miķeļi (September 29) to Mārtiņi (November 10). A Jesuit report from the end of 16th century suggests that historically a funeral procession was led by a person waving the axe to protect the deceased from Veļi coming to him too fast. The deceased was buried with items of trade to be able to secure livelihood in the afterlife. Bread and beer was also given. In autumn the souls were invited back home for a feast. The house would be clean and a table with foods set. At the beginning of the feast, an elder would invite Veļi by calling the names of all the dead who once lived in the house the living could remember. He would then give a speech scolding them for not having protected the house well enough, ask them to do better next year and then invite them to eat. After the meal was done Veļi would be chased out and the house would be carefully cleaned to ensure no one had stayed behind and the dirt would be thrown in water. Veļi could also be invited to chaste themselves in the bathhouse. The food could also be brought to the graveyard or left in the bathhouse, barn or granary. In that case, it would be checked next morning to see if Veļi had touched it, to figure out if they were benevolent to the living. In this case, a candle would be lit so the dead could see the food. In some regions, pails of milk and water along with a clean towel would also be left so Veļi could wash themselves. Those who did not honor Veļi were said to have a poor harvest. In modern Latvia, a form of ancestor worship has been preserved in celebrating the Remembrance day of the dead in late November and in graveyard days. (kapusvētki) which are held in late summer, and the precise dates of which are decided by whoever owns or manages a particular graveyard. During this day or sometimes days people come to clean up the graves of the deceased of their family.

=== Demons ===
The belief that all sorcerers and witches are evil only came in to being after Christianization. Before it was believed that, like everyone, sorcerers could be both evil and good. After Christianization it was believed that sorcerers were servants of evil called burvji; burtnieks (wizards) and raganas (witches) marry velni. These might, in reality, have been folk medicine practitioners.

Laumas and spīganas, terms speculated to originally refer to different notions, were also used to refer to witches in some areas. With the help of Jods, they could turn into various beings or have evil spirits serve them. Thus the demons could variously be thought to be independent spirits or spirits of sorcerers flying around. It was thought that souls of sorcerers leave their bodies, which become dead and can then be permanently killed by turning it, as the soul does not know how to return into the body.

There are also reports of werewolves (vilkači, vilkati) – humans who could turn into wolves. The turning was usually accidental as it happened when someone stood between two pines which had grown together at a certain time. This time varied depending on the region. There are conflicting reports on what forces they serve, though they usually serve no one and are just beasts.

Witches are often reported to steal milk either by themselves or by employing toads and snakes, believed to be capable of sucking it from a cow's udder and then regurgitating it on command.

Another beast sometimes said to be in a sorcerer's service or even a sorcerer's pet was pūķis (dragon) – a being who would steal grain and other riches and bring them to its owner. It would be kept in a separate room that nobody could enter without the owner's permission. Dragons would be fed the first bit of every meal. If a dragon felt that it was not revered enough it would turn on the owner and burn the house down. Sometimes dragons could speak.

A demon, sometimes related to sorcerers but usually said to be the soul of a child condemned to haunt until the time he or she ought to have died, is Lietuvēns, who tortures people, cattle, and horses during the night and who is associated with sleep paralysis.

Similarly, it is sometimes reported that Vadātājs is a ghost, sometimes of a prematurely deceased person and sometimes seeking to kill a person in way similar to his own death. Often, however, vadātājs is a devil himself. This demon attacks travelers, making them confused and unable to find their way. Often its aim seems to be to lead people to the nearest body of water, where they would drown.

Velns (pl. Velni) are beings whose young are portrayed as roughly half the size of a human. The young velni are not physically powerful, but are still mischievous and sometimes even stupid. All velni have black fur and occasionally horns on their head. Grown velni are strong and occasionally have multiple heads, this is best portrayed in the famous fairy tale "Kurbads". All velni are greedy. They live in "Pekle" or later referred to as "Elle". To get to Pekle you have to find a very deep hole, usually in caves, swamps, or the roots of a large tree, as Pekle is not another realm, but simply a place beneath the surface of the Earth.

Sumpurņi ('Dogsnouts') are beings that are taller than a human and live in forests. Their most distinguishing feature is having the body of a human covered in fur and the head of a dog or sometimes bird. Sumpurņi also have a tail, it was believed that they had a hierarchical society with nobles and even kings, the length of one's tail would determine his position in their society. When in a state of rage, sumpurņi would attack humans and other animals and tear them apart and suck their blood. The order of this is sometimes reversed.

=== Fate goddesses ===
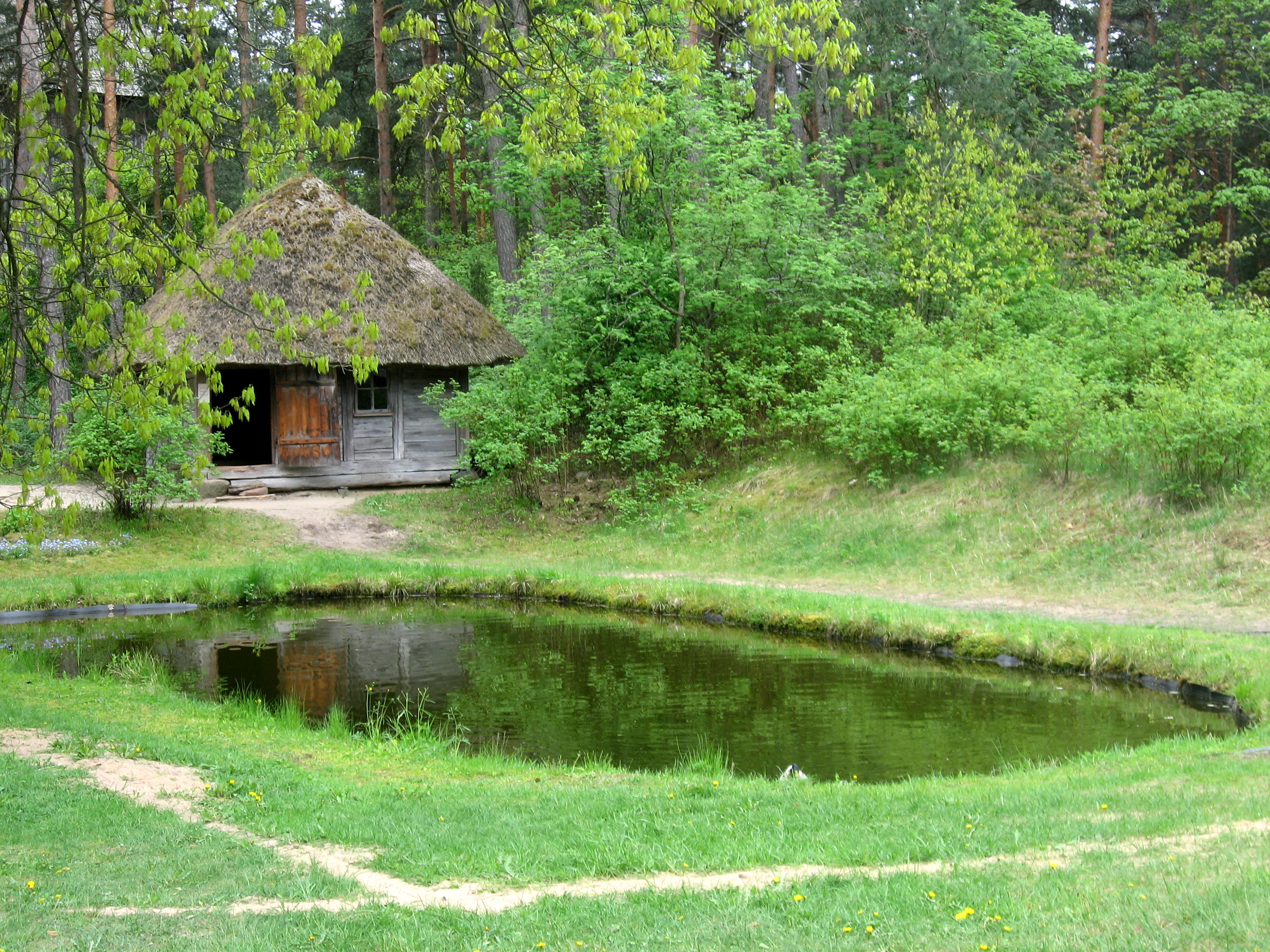
19th-century bathhouse in The Ethnographic Open-Air Museum of Latvia. As bathhouses traditionally were used for birthing, related rituals honoring Laima also were carried out there

The most important goddess of fate is Laima (Goddess of luck). She lives on Earth and is closely involved in human life. Her basic function is related to childbirth and deciding a child's fate. Traditionally women would give birth in bathhouses. The path leading to a bathhouse would be cleansed so Laima could easily make her way to help in the birthing process. The woman would be ritually cleansed and would offer prayers and give ritual offerings to Laima. After a successful birth, married women would feast, with Laima being reserved a place of honor in the bathhouse as sign of gratitude. She would also determine a person's fate – a decision even she herself could not alter afterward. She was expected to help in other important aspects of life as well and cared for well-being of the people in general. Unmarried girls would pray to her to give them good husbands and happy marriage. She also ensured the fertility of fields and animals (horses in particular) to some extent.

Another goddess, Māra, also has several functions in common with Laima. Although this view has been criticized, many researchers agree that Māra is synonymous with Saint Mary. It has been suggested that Mary took over some functions of earlier deities, including Laima. However, Māra was used to refer to Saint Mary, who was also called upon during childbirth and to help with a number of ailments by either her modern Latvian name Marija or number of Christian euphemisms. All these were also used as euphemisms to refer to uterus in folk magic. The opposing view, based on comparative linguistics linking her with a wide range of other Indoeuropean deities, is that she was an important pre-Christian chthonic deity that both gives and takes life.

Other two goddesses with similar functions are Kārta and Dēkla. Dēkla is mainly mentioned in folklore from a single Catholic area of Courland, historically the District of Pilten. Kārta is even more rarely mentioned in folklore, she is thought to execute the decisions Laima and Dēkla make, as suggested by her name. She is always alongside Laima and may likely a historically recent occurrence that has more to do with phonesthetics of folksongs than religion.

=== Fertility gods ===
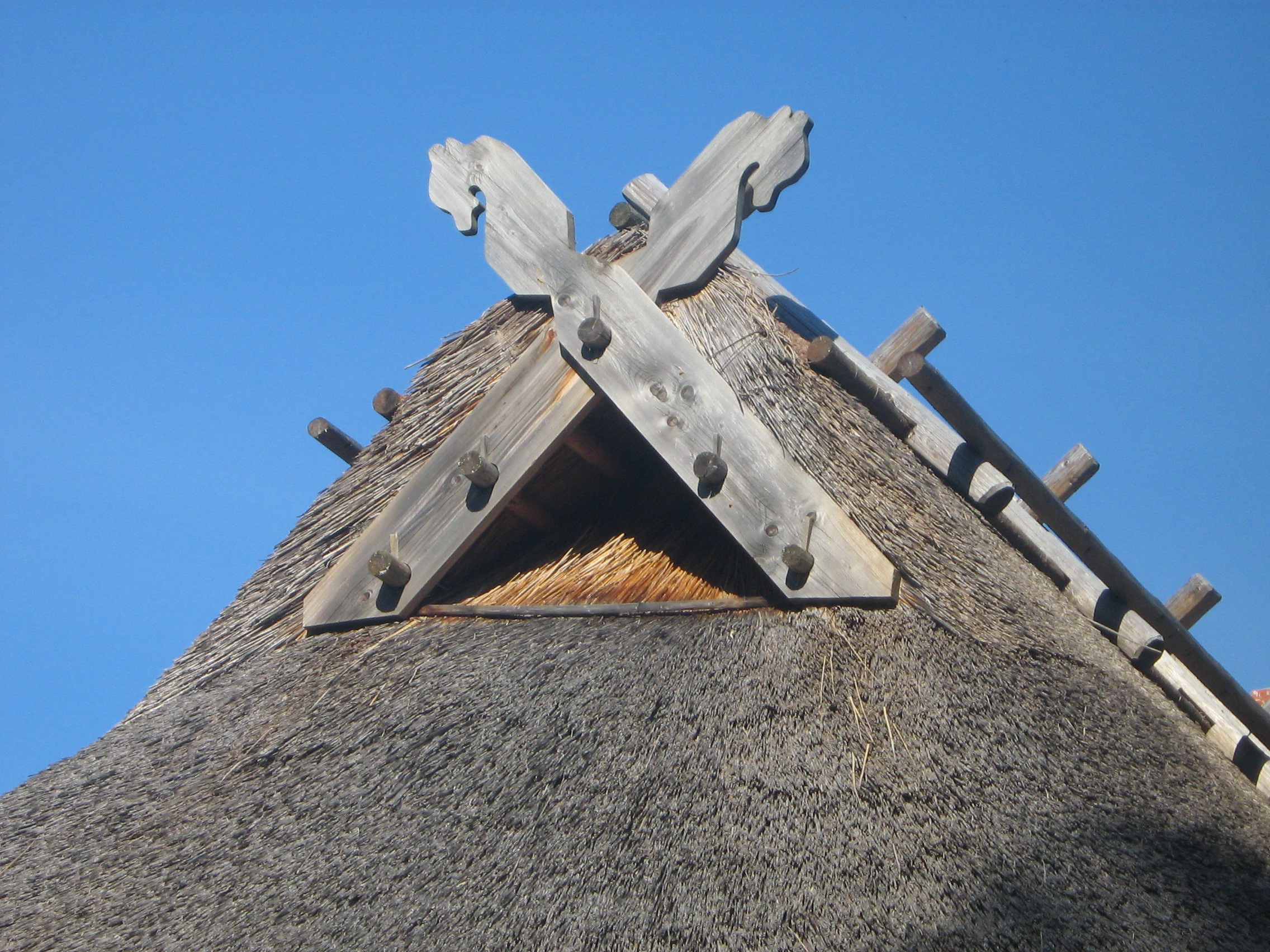
Roof decoration symbolizing Jumis

Ensuring fertility was an important function that was assigned to a number of spirits and deities. Ensuring a good harvest was the primary function of Jumis. It was thought that he lives in the fields, therefore the last of the crop would be left on the field for Jumis to live in. This belief was the basis of a ritual involving the catching of Jumis, performed on Miķeļi, which usually was the last day of harvest. This seems to have involved singing songs as the last of the grain was reaped, asking Jumis to run to wherever the crop was stored. The last bit of the crop would be searched for Jumis and then tied into a knot. Another related practice was to make wreaths of grain cereals that would be kept until next year when the seeds from them would be sown first. It was usually attempted to place Jumis stalks in these wreaths. In this sense Jumis is symbolized by stalks with two ears. Any fruit or flower showing such abnormal duplication was called Jumis. It was believed that eating Jumis would cause women or female animals to give birth to twins.

Ensuring the well-being of livestock was, however, a function of other gods. Ūsiņš was associated with the Ūsiņi celebration and thus somewhat merged with Saint George. He was worshiped mainly as the guardian of horses. It is also thought he might have been the god of bees and the god of light. The main protector of cows seems to have been Māra. She is also known as Lopu Marija (Mary of livestock), Lopu māte (Mother of livestock) and Piena māte (Mother of milk). Her function was to ensure that cows give milk. Therefore, she is also often mentioned in connection with water, rivers and sea, as water symbolized milk, while clay symbolized butter. Historical sources also mention that Latvian pagans would venerate snakes (likely grass snakes) and toads as „milk mother” and feed them with milk.

=== Other practices ===
There may have been a number of other spirits and deities venerated by Latvians. There is, for example, a wide range of deities referred to as Mahte ("mother") – their number is variously estimated to be anywhere from 50 to 115. The reasons for such unclarity are that sometimes the authenticity of certain "mothers” is questioned, there are differences between regions in what deities are worshiped and also many of these are synonymous titles of a single deity. Mother and other kinship terms can be used merely to signify age and also to show respect (when referring to older people). While most female spirits are called "mothers”, male spirits would be called "father” (tēvs) or "master” (kungs) or "god” (dievs, dieviņš) or "spirit” (gars, gariņš). Historical sources report that there was a belief that spirits live in the ground. There also are Mājas gari ('house spirits') or Mājas kungs ('master of house'), who lived and were worshiped at home. These sometimes were sacred animals. They were often fed a first bit of every food. Spirits and deities were also worshiped in designated places, which could be visited only at certain times of year. It was believed that visiting them at other times or defiling, even unknowingly, such a site in any way would bring great misfortune to the guilty party - blindness or death are common examples. There were also animals, some known as dieva sunīši ('dogs of god'), whose killing would bring misfortune, these include stoats, wolf, frogs, ladybirds, etc. Sometimes, however, it was believed that killing would not bring misfortune, but that if the animal got away, it would carry out horrific revenge. This mostly refers to snakes. It was also believed that saying the name of an animal such as a wolf or snake would cause them to appear. There are similar beliefs about not mentioning the devil or plague. Somewhat related is the idea that whistling in certain places would invite the devil, while singing would invite god. Therefore, a large variety of euphemisms were used instead, including comparisons, human names, and other anthropomorphic terms – e.g. snakes were likened to ropes or called "brides", while the wolf was named Juris or Ansis or referred to as "man" (also "brother" or "friend") of the forest.

== See also ==
- Baltic mythology
- Dievturība
- Lithuanian mythology
- Celestial wedding in Baltic folklore
