= Dievas =

Baltic sky-god

Lithuanian Dievas, Latvian Dievs and Debestēvs ("Sky-Father"), Latgalian Dīvs, Old Prussian Diews, and Yotvingian Deivas was the primordial supreme god in Baltic mythology, and one of the most important deities, together with Perkūnas and the brother of Potrimpo. He was the god of light, the sky, prosperity, wealth, the ruler of gods, and the creator of the universe. Dievas is a direct successor of the Proto-Indo-European supreme sky father god *Dyēus of the root *deiwo-. Its Proto-Baltic form was *Deivas.

Dievas had two sons (Dievo sūneliai (Lithuanian) or Dieva dēli (Latvian)) known as the Heavenly Twins.

Since the conversion of Latvia and Lithuania to Christianity and continuing in modern times, this word refers to the Christian God.

In English, Dievas may be used as a word to describe the God (or, the supreme god) in the pre-Christian Baltic religion, where Dievas was understood to be the supreme being of the world. In Lithuanian and Latvian, it is also used to describe God as it is understood by major world religions today. Earlier *Deivas simply denoted the shining sunlit dome of the sky, as in other Indo-European mythologies. The celestial aspect is still apparent in phrases such as Saule noiet dievā ("The sun goes down to god"), from Latvian folksongs. In Hinduism, a group of celestial deities are called the devas, a result of shared Proto-Indo-European roots.

== Lithuanian conception of divinity ==
The conception of divinity in the old Lithuanian religion is still not always clear to modern scholars. A number of them suggest that Lithuanians had a pantheistic concept to their religion. This concept, according to the ideas of modern researchers, had to include the following:

- recognition of a single Divine Being, that is the core entity of the Universe.
- recognition of multiple divine beings that are on a different level of the main God or, in other words, hypostases of the single God.
- recognition of direct participation of the single God in lower levels in the shape of lower beings (manifestations of the single God). The known later sources give an exclusively human shape to the God, but it may be a limitation added by Christianity. The told manifestations of the God have features of modesty, fairness, chastity, delicacy etc., that show some moral priorities of ancient Lithuanians.

However, this understanding excludes the conception of a pantheon or of some other possible council of gods in the old pagan Lithuanian religion.

Many well-established sources concerning Lithuanian mythology do not contradict this conception, although there is not much data available. The lack of data leaves a wide gap for interpretations, and as a consequence, many scholars do not agree on all of the points above.

For example, a historian of the early 19th century, Theodor Narbutt, took the presence of the pantheon in Lithuanian mythology as an axiom. And, in spite of being subsequently criticized that his sources were unreliable, and that his interpretations did not always concur with evident data from Lithuanian folklore, Narbutt's mythology was presented in a pictorial and detailed way. His works had a certain influence on the thinking and ideas of some scholars.

Gintaras Beresnevičius noted that Dievas assumed a position of a non-active divine being - deus otiosus - therefore his cult among the Balts was doubtful and that sacred places devoted to Dangaus Dievas are not even mentioned in the Baltic mythology.

Concerning the God (Dievas) in the old Lithuanian religion, modern interpretations lack sources too. Regardless of the fact that the conception of the single Chief God was acknowledged by Lithuanians is well documented and is not in doubt. The word Dievas itself seems to be omitted respectfully or changed to its epithets in Lithuanian: Aukštojas ("The High One") Aukščiausiasis ('the Highest'), Visagalis ('the Omnipotent'), Praamžis ('the Eternal one') or Pondzejis ('Lord God'), and in Prussian as Occopirmzts.

[Note: in terms of the Lithuanian conception of supreme sky divinity reference can be made to the sun goddess Saulė for whom there is a vast corpus of popular lore, ref. Saulė]

== Lithuanian and Latvian interpretations ==
In the areas that became modern Lithuania and Latvia, Dievas (Dievs in Latvia), along with his twin brother, the trickster god Velns, created the universe by fighting with each other on a rock in the ocean that "became the central point in the universe".

Dievas is also called Praamžius, and under this moniker, he is the god of time. Praamžius is also "the god of the sky, peace...[,] and friendship in Lithuanian mythology" and played a role in creating the world.

== Manifestations ==
Many of the descriptions of Dievas are known from early Christian texts from Lithuania, which are presumably not a reliable source for earlier times. No earlier sources that describe Dievas in detail have been found. The myths describe Dievas manifesting in the shape of man only, particularly the shape of an old male sage or an old male beggar, "descend[ing] from the heavens" to test "humanity's goodness and generosity" in the latter form. But the linguistic data, e.g. the name for the Southernwood in Lithuanian, Diemedis, literally the God-tree, as well as some hints in historical legends, suggest that the manifestations might be believed to take other forms besides human, like forms of animals, birds, and plants.

== See also ==
- Romuva (religion)
- Dievturība
- Deus
- Brahman
- Týr
- Deva (Hinduism)
- Deva (Buddhism)
- List of Lithuanian gods and mythological figures
