= Saulė =

Baltic solar goddess

- Sun
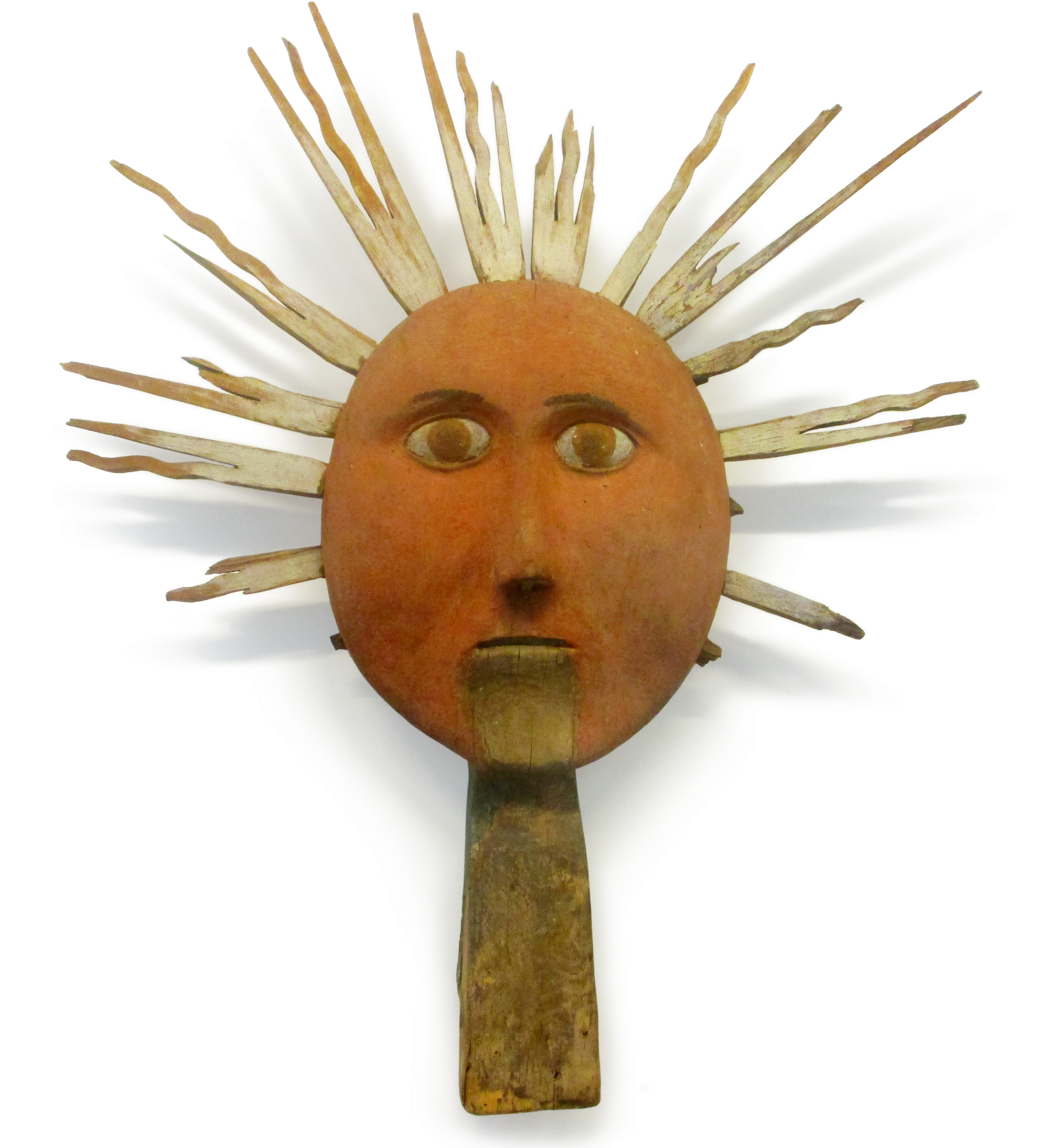
- Idol of the Saulė used for peasant rituals in the early 20th century from Palūšė, Ignalina District
- Consort: Mėnuo/Mēness
- Offspring: Žemyna; Indraja; Sėlija; Žiezdrė; Vaivora

Equivalents
- Etruscan: Usil
- Greek: Helios
- Hindu: Surya
- Indo-European: *Seh₂ul
- Norse: Sól
- Roman: Sol

Saulė (Lithuanian: Saulė, Latvian: Saule) is a solar goddess, and the common Baltic solar deity in Lithuanian and Latvian mythology. The noun Saulė/Saule in the Lithuanian and Latvian languages is also the conventional name for the Sun and originates from the Proto-Baltic name *Sauliā > *Saulē.

== Representation ==
Saulė is one of the most powerful deities, the goddess of the sun itself, responsible for all life on Earth. She is the patroness of the unfortunate, especially orphans. The Lithuanian and Latvian words for "the world" (pasaulis and pasaule) are translated as "[a place] under the Sun".

Saulė is mentioned in one of the earliest written sources on Lithuanian mythology. According to the Slavic translation of the Chronicle by John Malalas (1261), a smith named Teliavelis made the Sun and threw it into the sky. Missionary Jerome of Prague (ca. 1369–1440) spent three years attempting to Christianize Lithuania and later recounted a myth about the kidnapped Saulė. She was held in a tower by a powerful king and rescued by the zodiac (Signa Zodiaci) using a giant sledgehammer. Jerome swore that he personally witnessed the hammer, venerated by the locals.

== Family ==
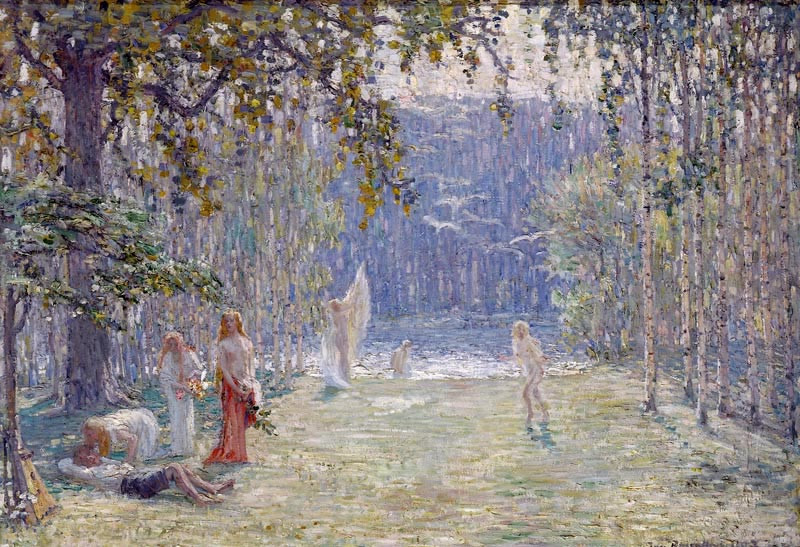
A circa 1912 painting by Janis Rozentāls depicting the daughters of Saule (Saules meitas)

Saulė and Mėnuo/Mēness (the Moon) were wife and husband. Mėnuo fell in love with Aušrinė (the morning star or Venus). For his infidelity, Perkūnas (thunder god) punished Mėnuo. There are different accounts of the punishment. One version claims that Mėnuo was cut into two pieces, but he did not learn from his mistakes, and thus the punishment is repeated every month. Another version claims that Mėnuo and Saulė divorced, but both wanted to see their daughter Žemyna (earth). That is why the Sun shines during the day, while the Moon visits at night. A third version claims that the face of Mėnuo was disfigured by either Dievas (the supreme god) or Saulė.

In other myths, Aušrinė is depicted as a daughter and servant of Saulė. Aušrinė lights the fire for Saulė and makes her ready for another day's journey across the sky. Vakarinė (the evening star) makes the bed for Saulė in the evening. In Lithuanian mythology, Saulė was mother of other planets: Indraja (Jupiter), Sėlija (Saturn), Žiezdrė (Mars), and Vaivora (Mercury).

== Feasts ==
Saulė's feast was celebrated during the summer solstice. Lithuanian Rasos (turned into Saint Jonas' Festival by Christianity) and Latvian Līgo (turned into Jāņi) involve making wreaths, looking for the magical fern flower, burning bonfires, dancing around and leaping over the fire, and greeting the Sun when it rises at around 4 am the next morning. It is the most joyous traditional holiday. The winter solstice is celebrated as the return of Saulė. Christianity absorbed Lithuanian Kūčios and Latvian Ziemassvētki into Christmas. Other celebrations took place around the equinoxes.

== Mythology ==
=== Colors ===
In Latvian folk songs, Saule and her daughter(s) are dressed in shawls woven with gold thread and Saule wears shoes of gold. She is also depicted in a silver, gold, or silk costume and wearing a sparkling crown.

She is sometimes portrayed as waking up "red" (sārta) or "in a red tree" during the morning. Saule is also said to own golden tools and garments: slippers, scarf, belt, and a golden boat she uses as her means of transportation. Other accounts ascribe her golden rings, golden ribbons, golden tassels, and even a golden crown.

Saule is also described as being dressed in clothes woven with "threads of red, gold, silver and white". In the Lithuanian tradition, the sun is also described as a "golden wheel" or a "golden circle" that rolls down the mountain at sunset. Also in Latvian riddles and songs, Saule is associated with the color red as if to indicate the "fiery aspect" of the sun; the setting and the rising sun are equated with a rose wreath and a rose in bloom due to their circular shapes. (Note: According to Lithuanian scholar Daiva Vaitkeviciene, Wilhelm Mannhardt's treatise on Latvian solar myths identified other metaphors for the Sun, such as "a golden apple", "a rose bush", and "red berries".)

=== Movements ===
Saulė is portrayed dancing in her gilded shoes on a silver hill and her fellow Baltic goddess Aušrinė is said to dance on a stone for the people on the first day of summer. In Lithuania, the Sun (identified as female) rides a car towards her husband, the Moon, "dancing and emitting fiery sparks" on the way.

=== Dwelling ===
In a myth from Lithuania, a man named Joseph becomes fascinated with Aušrinė appearing in the sky and goes on a quest to find the "second sun", who is actually a maiden that lives on an island in the sea and has the same hair like the Sun. In Baltic folklore, Saulė is said to live in a silver gated castle at the end of the sea, located somewhere in the east, or to go to an island in the middle of the sea for her nocturnal rest. In folksongs, Saule sinks into the bottom of a lake to sleep at night, in a silver cradle "in the white seafoam". (Note: The Otherworld in Latvian mythology is named Viņsaule 'The Other Sun', a place where the sun goes at night and also the abode of the dead.)

=== Vehicle ===
The Sun, which has a feminine gender in Baltic languages, is described as an anthropomorphized being that rides across the celestial abode in a vehicle, like a carriage or a chariot, which is described as saulės ratai in Lithuanian and saules rati in Latvian.

Saulė also drives a carriage with copper wheels, a "gleaming copper chariot", or a golden chariot pulled by untiring horses, or a "pretty little sleigh" (kamaņiņa) made of fish-bones. Saulė is also described as driving her shining car on the way to her husband, the Moon. In other accounts, she is said to sail the seas on a silver or a golden boat, which, according to legend, is what her chariot transforms into for her night travels. In a Latvian folksong, Saule hangs her sparkling crown on a tree in the evening and enters a golden boat to sail away.

=== Horses ===
The Sun is associated with horses in Baltic mythology: Lithuanian riddles describe the Sun as a ball with a hundred horses ("šimtas arklių nepavež") - an image repeated in Latvian songs ("Simts kumeliņu").

Saulė's horses are also mentioned in several pieces of Baltic folklore. Her horses are said to be of white color; in other accounts, they amount to three steeds of golden, silver, and diamond colors. In Latvian dainas (folk songs), her horses are described as yellow, of a golden or a fiery color. The sun's steeds are also portrayed as having hooves and bridles of gold in the dainas, and as golden beings themselves or of a bay colour, "reflect[ing] the hues of the bright or the twilight sky". When she begins her nocturnal journey through the World Sea, her chariot changes into a boat and "the Sun swims her horses", which signifies that "she stops to wash her horses in the sea".

Scholars point out that the expressions geltoni žirgeliai or dzelteni kumeliņi ('golden' or 'yellow horses'), which appear in Latvian dainas, seem to be a recurrent poetic motif. According to Nijole Laurinkiene, the expression could refer to a golden or fiery character to the animals.

=== Other depictions ===
According to studies by professor Vaira Vīķe-Freiberga and ethnologue Nijolė Laurinkienė, Saule is also depicted in folksongs as a "mother" (Lithuanian motinėlė, Latvian māmuliņa) who comforts orphans, which is the reason why the sun takes time to rise. In other folksongs, the personified female Sun is also associated with the color "white" (Latv balt-), such as the imagery of a white shirt, the expression "mīļā, balte" ("Sun, dear, white"), and the description of the trajectory of the sun (red as it rises, white as it journeys on its way).

== See also ==
- Proto-Indo-European mythology
- Indo-European cosmogony
- Baltic mythology
- Lithuanian mythology
- Prussian mythology
- Latvian mythology
- List of solar deities
- List of Lithuanian gods and mythological figures

== Bibliography ==
- Greimas, Algirdas J. (1992). Of Gods and Men. Studies in Lithuanian Mythology. Indiana University Press. ISBN 0-253-32652-4.
- Laurinkienė, Nijolė (2018). "Saulės bei metalų kultas ir mitologizuotoji kalvystė. Metalų laikotarpio idėjų atšvaitai baltų religijoje ir mitologijoje". Būdas (in Lithuanian): 51–61.
- Massetti, Laura (2019). "Antimachus's Enigma on Erytheia, the Latvian Sun-goddess and a Red Fish". The Journal of Indo-European Studies. 47 (1–2).
- West, Martin Litchfield (2007). Indo-European Poetry and Myth. Oxford, UK: Oxford University Press. ISBN 978-0-19-928075-9.
