= Alcis (gods) =

Divine brothers worshipped by the Germanic Naharvali

The Alcis or Alci (Proto-Germanic *alhiz ~ *algiz) were a pair of divine young brothers worshipped by the Naharvali, an ancient Germanic tribe from Central Europe. The Alcis are solely attested by Roman historian and senator Tacitus in his ethnography Germania, written around 98 AD.

== Name ==
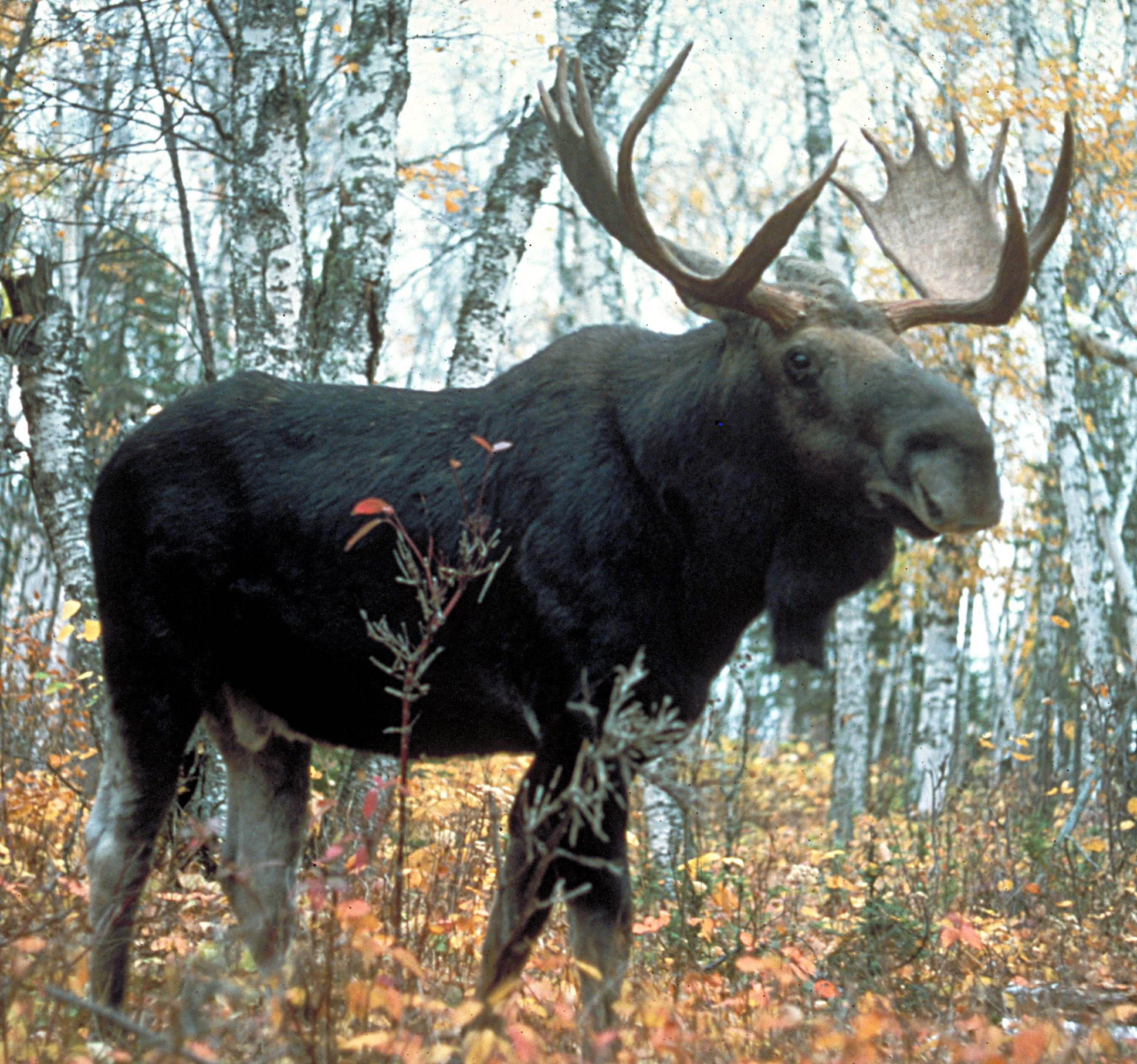
An elk (Alces alces) bull (in North America, the name elk would be applied to Cervus canadensis, while the Alces alces would be called moose).

According to some scholars, the name Alcis should be interpreted as a latinized form of Proto-Germanic *alhiz ~ *algiz (variants *elhaz ~ *elhōn), meaning 'elk (Alces alces)'. (Note: As per Grimm's Law, the Proto-Indo-European sound */k/ turned into Proto-Germanic /h/ ([x]). This sound correspondence led Latin authors to render the Germanic aspirate /h/, unknown in their native language, as a velar plosive /k/.) It might thus be cognate with the Old Norse elgr, from the type *algiz, and with Old English eolh and Old High German elaho, from the types *elho-, *elhōn-. This would make the Alcis brothers the elk- or stag-gods. According to the Oxford English Dictionary, the Latin alces and Greek álkē (ἄλκη) were "probably adopted from Germanic or some other northern language".

Other scholars propose to link *alhiz to the Germanic root *alh- (cf. Goth. alhs 'temple', Old English ealgian 'to protect'; further Lith. alkas 'holy grove'), and thus to interpret the Alcis as 'protective' deities. (Note: On a related note, alkas designates "sacred sites of the Balts" where "sacred offerings" were made. These sites include bogs (alka(os)/aukos), rivers (alkupiai) and islets (alkos salos).)

== Attestation ==
According to Tacitus, the Alcis were a divine pair worshiped by the Naharvali. He identifies the latter as a subgroup of the Lugii, whom he seems to locate in Silesia. The Roman historian states that their cult took place in a sacred grove, with a priest dressed in women's clothing presiding. The deities were given the name Alcis, and venerated as young men and brothers, but no images of them were used. A similarity with Castor and Pollux is noted by Tacitus, though he states the cult was indigenous, not derived from an outside influence.

Among these last is shown a grove of immemorial sanctity. A priest in female attire has the charge of it. But the deities are described in Roman language as Castor and Pollux. Such, indeed, are the attributes of the divinity, the name being Alcis. They have no images, or, indeed, any vestige of foreign superstition, but it is as brothers and as youths that the deities are worshipped.

— Tacitus. Ch.43.

The source of Tacitus' information about the Alcis remains unclear. Since the Naharvali lived far from the Rhineland, he must have learnt of the deities from a secondary source, either from other Germanic tribes that lived closer to the empire, or from someone who had travelled from the empire to the land of the Naharvali. According to scholar James B. Rives, the second hypothesis appears more likely: the amber trade route passed through what is now Silesia, and ancient merchants are known to have drawn up descriptions of their journey. Furthermore, the interpretatio romana of the Alcis as equivalent to Castor and Polux was probably done by someone from the Graeco-Roman world. Marek Olędzki identified the grove with Ptolemy's Límios álsos (Λίμιος ἄλσος) and placed it on Mount Ślęża.

== Scholarly reception ==
The Alcis are generally regarded in scholarship as a reflex of the Divine Twins, a pair of Indo-European youthful horsemen. Tacitus identifies the Alcis with the Graeco-Roman Castor and Pollux, another probable reflex of the Divine Twins (along with the Ashvins, Ašvieniai, and Dieva Dēli). Despite the lack of pictorial representation, the Roman historian (or his source) probably did this "translation" based on reported attributes of the Alcis, who are described are divine young men and brothers.

This origin may give support to the interpretation of the Alcis as elk-shaped or elk-gods, even though the widespread description of the Divine Twins as rescuers, healers and protectors in other Indo-European mythologies does not rule out the second proposition either. A speculative relation of the cult with the Germanic rune Algiz (ᛉ) which is interpreted in the later Old Norse Sigrdrífumál as laeknishendr ('healing hands'), may be significant in our understanding of the etymological issue.

== See also ==
- Grevensvænge figurines
- Hengist and Horsa
- Haddingjar
- Divine twins
- Aśvins brothers of Hindu mythology
