= Kulah khud =

West Asian armor and decorative head piece

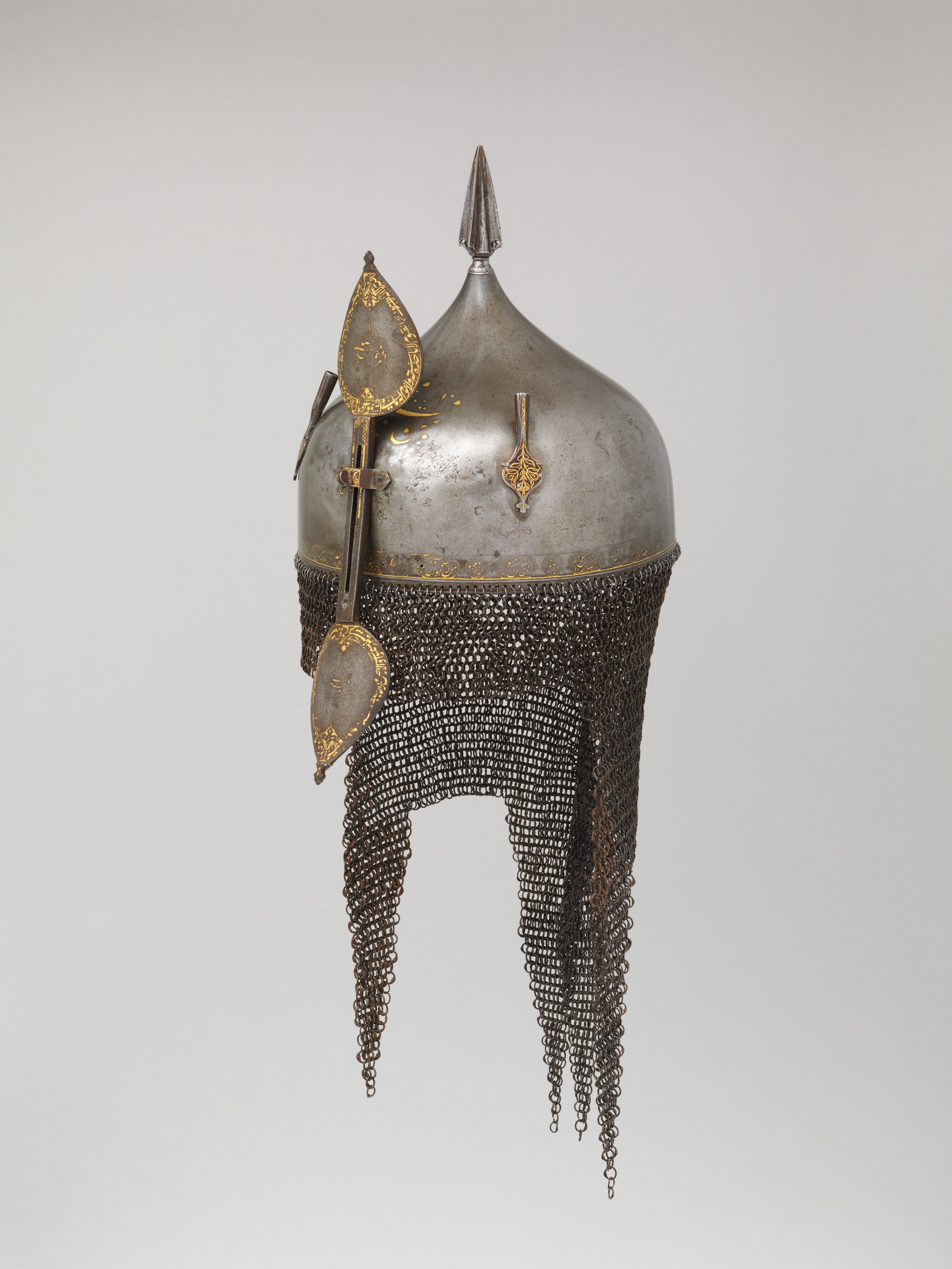
A style of helmet known as top in India. This top came from the Deccan region.

Kulah Khuds (Persian: کلاه خود; also known as top in India and devil masks among English-speaking arms collectors) were used in western Asia for battle and as decorative head pieces.

== Form and origin ==
Khula Khud helmets originated in Central Asia and Turkestan; they were worn by the soldiers of Persian Empire and Mughal Empire in the 18th–19th centuries. Made of steel, these bowl-shaped helmets were designed as either low and flat, or high and pointed. They sometimes contained a spike socket at the top of the helmet, which resembles a spearhead with a cross-like section. Two or three plume holders were attached on either side of the skull, used to mount feathers from birds such as the egret.

The helmet had an iron-and-brass or brass-and-copper aventail that hung at the base of the helmet to protect the neck, shoulders and the temple of the face. Sometimes, the aventail extended down to cover the eyes and the nose. The low end of the aventail was often shaped in a zig-zag triangular pattern (vandyked).

A bar made of iron or steel was attached to the front of the helmet with a bracket and could be adjusted in position – so when not in use, it could slide upward and fasten with a link, a hook, or a set screw. The two ends of the bar expanded into leaf-shaped plates, forming a finial. In some Indian tops, the lower end of the bar was designed as a large crescent-shaped metal guard that protected most of the face below the eye level. One rare version of the helmet included three irons protecting the nose and the cheeks.

== Decoration ==
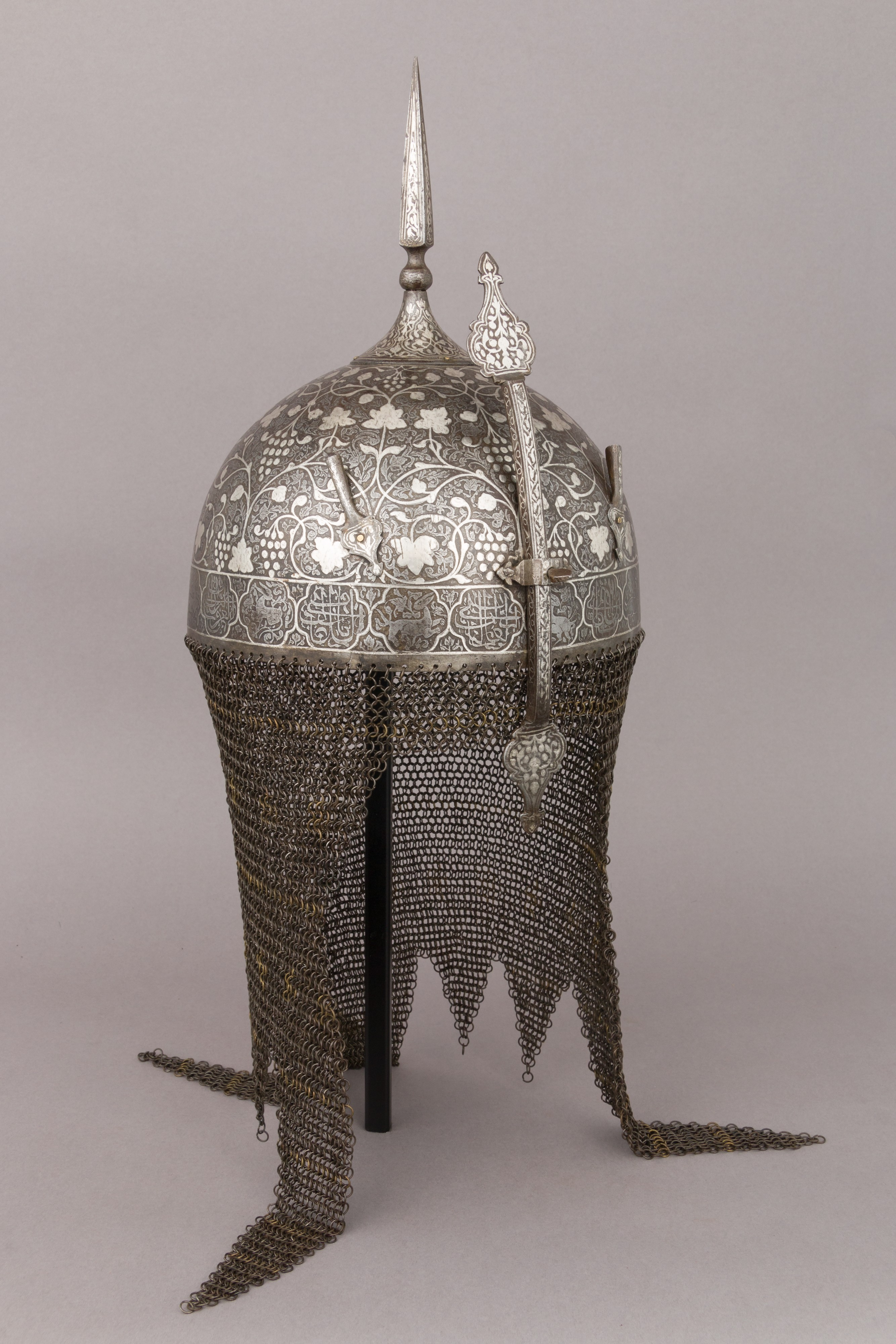
A highly ornate top from an eighteenth-century Mughal warrior

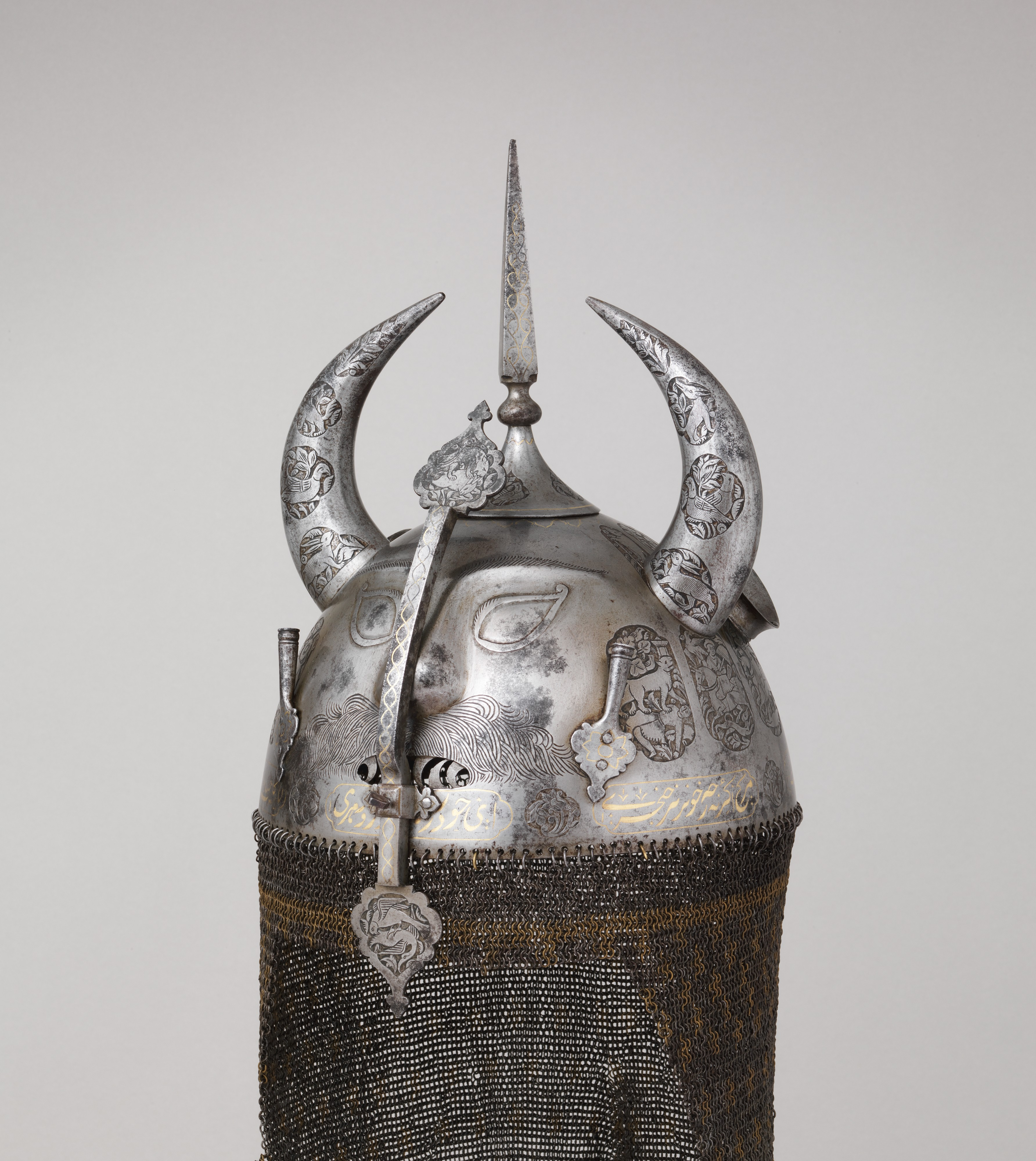
An Iranian devil mask with horns and a face from the Qajar dynasty

Despite the similarity in their design, the Khula Khud helmets were decorated with a wide degree of variations depending on the cultures from which they were created. Decorations often appeared in the skull and the nasal bar, which were often heavily decorated with patterned motifs of inlaid brass, silver or gold; or decorated with figurative images. One Mughal top helmet featured calligraphic inscriptions from the Qur'an, supposedly to gain "Help from Allah and a speedy victory." A top discovered in Gwalior, India, featured a motif of the skull and crossbones sign of European influence. Another part of the Khula Khud helmet that was often a focus of artistic decoration, was the leaf-shaped finials of the nasal bar. A Sikh top featured the figure of Ganesha carved onto the nasal bar. The Khula Khud helmet was only decorated with some metals, and usually no organic decorations.

== Revival ==
Despite the modernization of Iran's military in the nineteenth century, traditional armor continues to be manufactured. Since the nineteenth century, the Khula Khud has been displayed in military parades, used as a part of costumes worn in dramatizations, and sold as a souvenir.

== See also ==
- Turban helmet

== Cited works ==
- Gahir, Sunita; Spencer, Sharon, eds. (2006). Weapon – A Visual History of Arms and Armor. New York City: DK Publishing. ISBN 9780756622107.
- Stone, George Cameron (2013). A Glossary of the Construction, Decoration and Use of Arms and Armor: in All Countries and in All Times. Dover: Courier Corporation. ISBN 9780486131290.
- "Kulah Khud (helmet) - Kulah Khud (helmet)". www.amirmohtashemi.com.
