= Turban helmet =

Combat helmet design from Ottoman Turkey

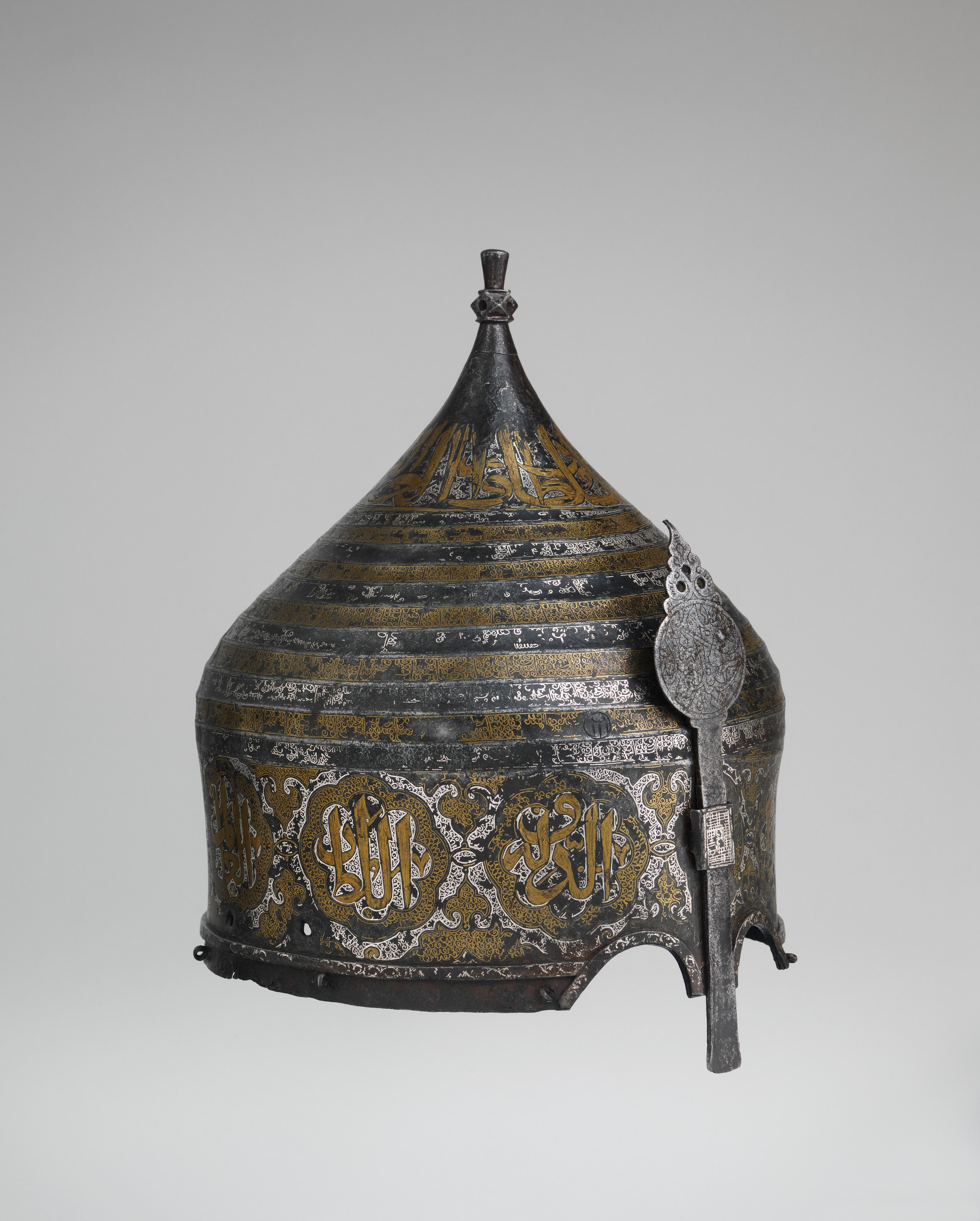
Late 15th-century turban helmet in the style of Turkish armour.

The turban helmet or Tolga in Turkish, is a historical variety of combat helmet with a bulbous shape and fluting that imitates the folds of a turban. Turban helmets originated in Ottoman Turkey, primarily used by warriors and some non-Turkish auxiliaries. Turban helmets are also worn by Sikhs.

== History ==
According to the Metropolitan Museum of Art, turban helmet prototype were found in pre-Islamic Sasanian Iran (224–651), but the sweeping outline, reminiscent of the domes of mosques, has contributed to this type of helmet being recognized today as decidedly Islamic.

Early Ottoman helmets were usually conical in shape, with neck guards in the form of a plate (normally either chain mail or padded). Between the middle of the 14th century until the beginning of the 16th century the helmets gradually became larger. These large helmets became more elaborate in design and were sometimes fluted. It was worn by the Ottoman warrior over a cloth turban. The distinctive shape of the turban helmets was achieved by forging a single plate of steel or iron. The helmet tapers to a point at the top where a separately forged finial was attached. Turban helmets have two curves on the rim that act as openings for the eyes. The aventail or mail defense is attached to the rim, with a vervelles by a cord. The aventail extends downward to protect the face and the neck. Sometimes an aventail was fixed using a lead seal stamped with a mark typical of Ottoman arsenals. An adjustable nasal bar to protect the nose was fastened with a bracket to the front side of the helmet, between the eye-openings. The spike on the top was to fend off evil birds trying to attack the warriors.

== Decoration ==
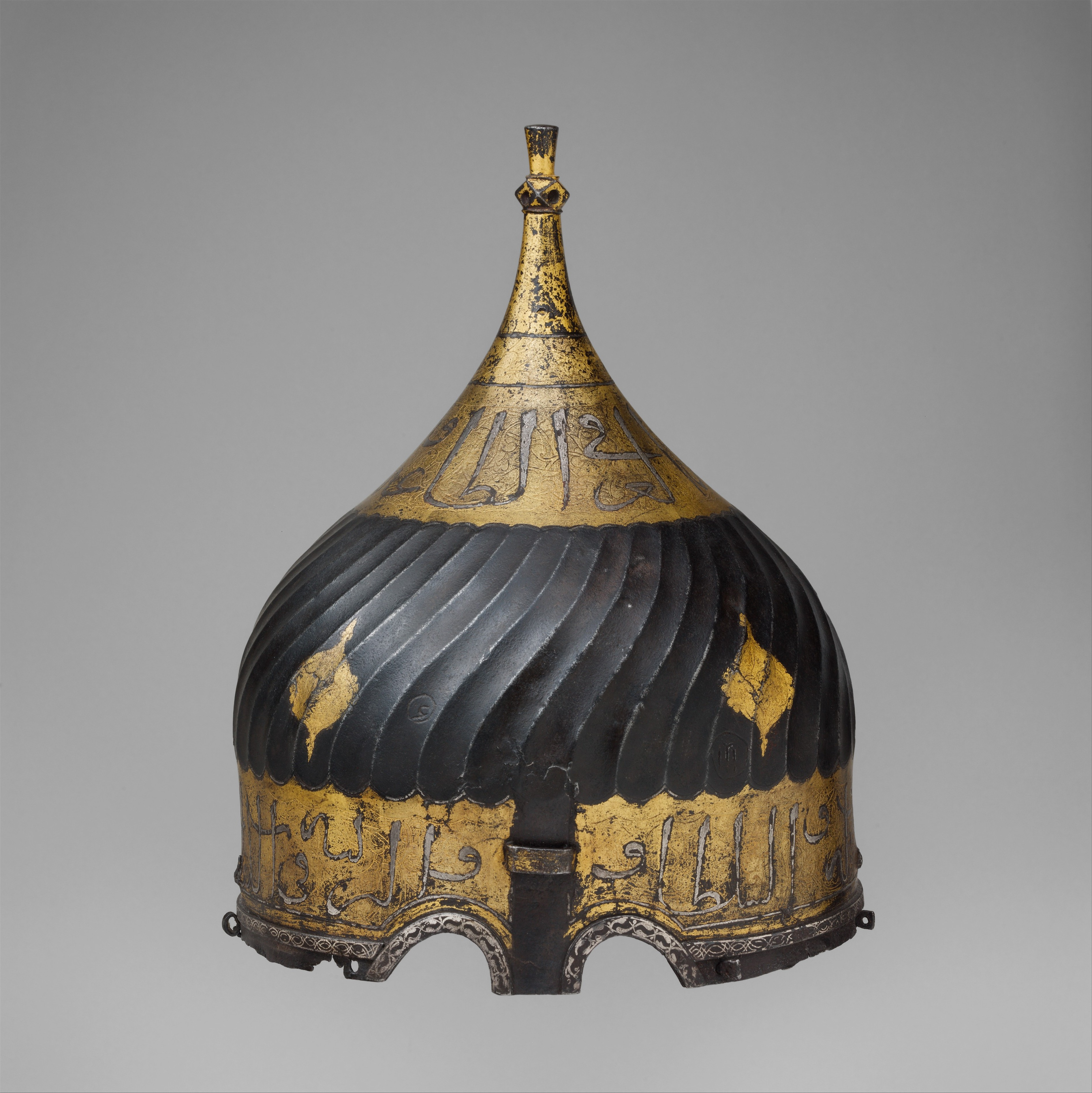
Late 15th-century turban helmet inlaid with silver and gold.

In Ottoman Turkey, some mystical dervish groups would wear turbans folded several times to reflect some important mystical number. The fluted design of the turban helmet might replicate this practice; this indicates that the turban helmet is also worn as a kind of religious insignia. The religious nature of the turban helmet was underlined by the presence of Arabic inscriptions taken from the Quran. These Quranic inscriptions supposedly provided God's protective power to the wearer. Most inscriptions on turban helmets, instead glorify the name of the ruler to whom the warrior was loyal. Other inscriptions were written as advice on how to gain virtue.

The heavy religious symbolism in the turban helmet indicates that the warriors wearing the helmet were involved in a kind of Holy War. Turban helmets were designed and worn together with a mail and plate armor shirt or jacket in the heavy cavalries. Several armors displayed in museum shows that both artifacts have matching decoration.

After the development of firearms, turban helmets lost their military value, becoming ceremonial objects that were traded and displayed to show wealth. Some turban helmets have inscriptions inlaid with precious metals like gold and silver, with decorations of arabesque motifs around the edges.

== See also ==
- Kulah khud
- Fortress turban

== Cited works ==
- Alexander, David G. (2015). Islamic Arms and Armor in The Metropolitan Museum of Art. New York City: Metropolitan Museum of Art. ISBN 9781588395702.
- Gahir, Sunita; Spencer, Sharon, eds. (2006). Weapon - A Visual History of Arms and Armor. New York City: DK Publishing. ISBN 9780756622107.
- Stone, George Cameron (2013). A Glossary of the Construction, Decoration and Use of Arms and Armor: in All Countries and in All Times. Dover: Courier Corporation. ISBN 9780486131290.
