= Veksø Helmets =

Bronze Age ceremonial horned helmets

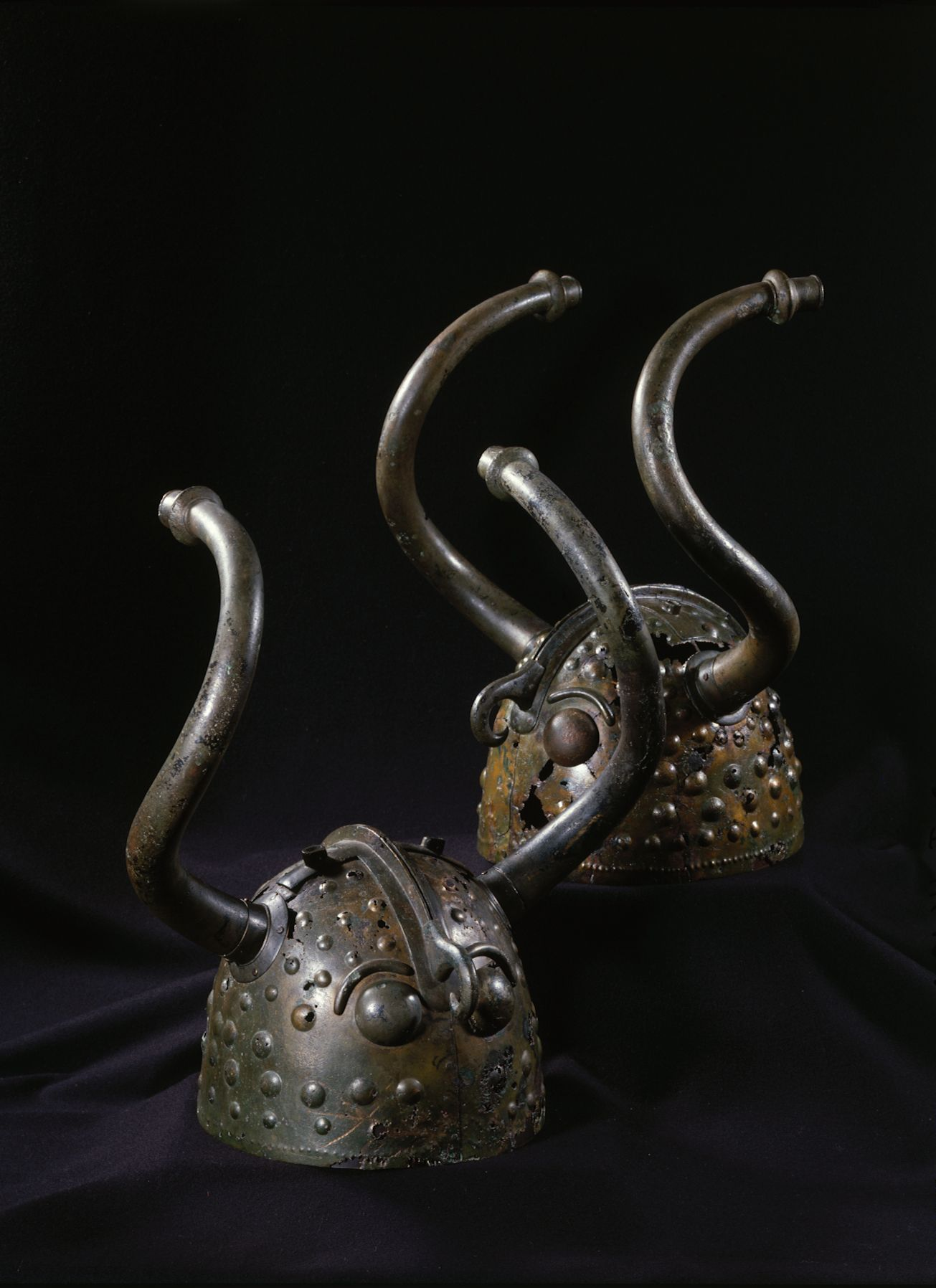
- Material: Bronze
- Created: Nordic Bronze Age
- Discovered: 1942; Veksø, Denmark
- Present location: National Museum of Denmark, Copenhagen

The Veksø helmets (or Viksø helmets) are a pair of Bronze Age ceremonial horned helmets found near Veksø in Zealand, Denmark.

== Overview ==
In 1942 a workman was digging (c. 0.7m below the moss surface) at a peat bog extraction site in Brøns Mose, Viksø when he felt his spade go through something hard. Thought to be waste, the find was set aside. On later inspection, though, it was found to be a decorated bronze object with an associated wooden plate with a groove - which appeared to have been a stand for a helmet. A subsequent archaeological investigation at the discovery site in the same year returned further helmet pieces. Analysis of remains during the 1940s determined that the wooden tray was of ash, and that there may have been a feather trim to the helmet. The first technical report on the helmets was published by Norling-Christensen in 1946.

It is thought that the Brøns Mose was a lake in the Bronze Age, and an extension of the modern Løged Sø waterbody - making the helmets a likely bog votive offering. Radiocarbon dating place the wooden trays associated with the helmets to an earlier date than the helmets. Additionally shards of broken pots were found above the helmets, but may not be an associated deposit.

In 2019, a worker at the National Museum of Denmark discovered birch tar on one of the horns while preparing to photograph them. A sample was subsequently sent for carbon dating. The results showed that the latest possible date of deposition was the late Nordic Bronze Age; between 857 and 907 BC.

== Design and construction ==
Two helmets were found, almost identical in design - the primary material was a high tin bronze (16.8%) with small amounts of lead, arsenic, antimony, and nickel (all 0.1 to 1%) and traces of silver (~0.05%). Stylistically the hemispherical main part resembles the plain textile hats of the period as well as Urnfield metal helmets - the hemispheres were made from two hammered pieces joined with rivets in a seam running front to back across the top, with a heavy joining rim or crest across the top - either end of the crest ended in a downpointing 'hook' possibly intended to recall the beak of a raptor. Ornamentation included bosses across the surface of various sizes, including two larger 'eye' positioned bosses, together with eyebrows. A row of bosses along the lower rim each terminate in an S-shaped (or Swan shaped) ornamentation - thus resembling double-sterned-ships. (Vogelsonnenbarken). The helmet's horns are also S-shaped, with a twist recalling both a bull's horns and the twist in a pair of lurs. Fittings between horns and crest held bird's feathers, and it has been suggested that the crest was originally adorned with a hair. The helmet has a human appearance coupled with select zoomorphic elements.

Overall the design takes cues from both Urnfield and Nordic culture, though some elements, such as bulls' horns are found elsewhere - such as Iberia, and Sardinia, and horned helms are also seen in contemporary descriptions of the Sea Peoples in the Mediterranean and near East.

Vandkilde states the helmet is thought to have been made in Scandinavia, using European bronze working techniques, though others suggest the helmet was imported from Italy. The shape of the horns suggest the Italian long-horn cattle, a subtype of the species Bos primigenius (the aurochs).

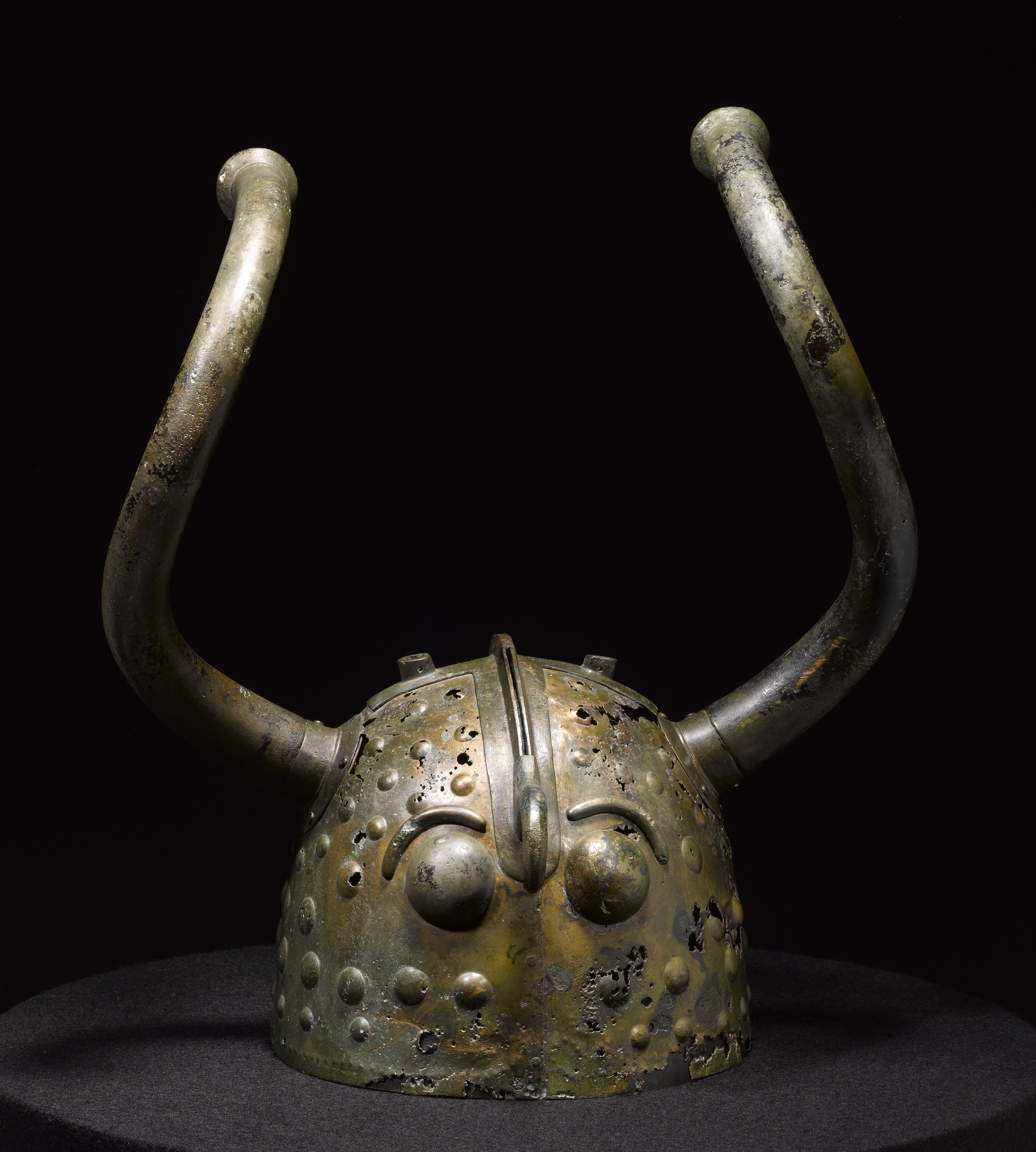
Front of helmet

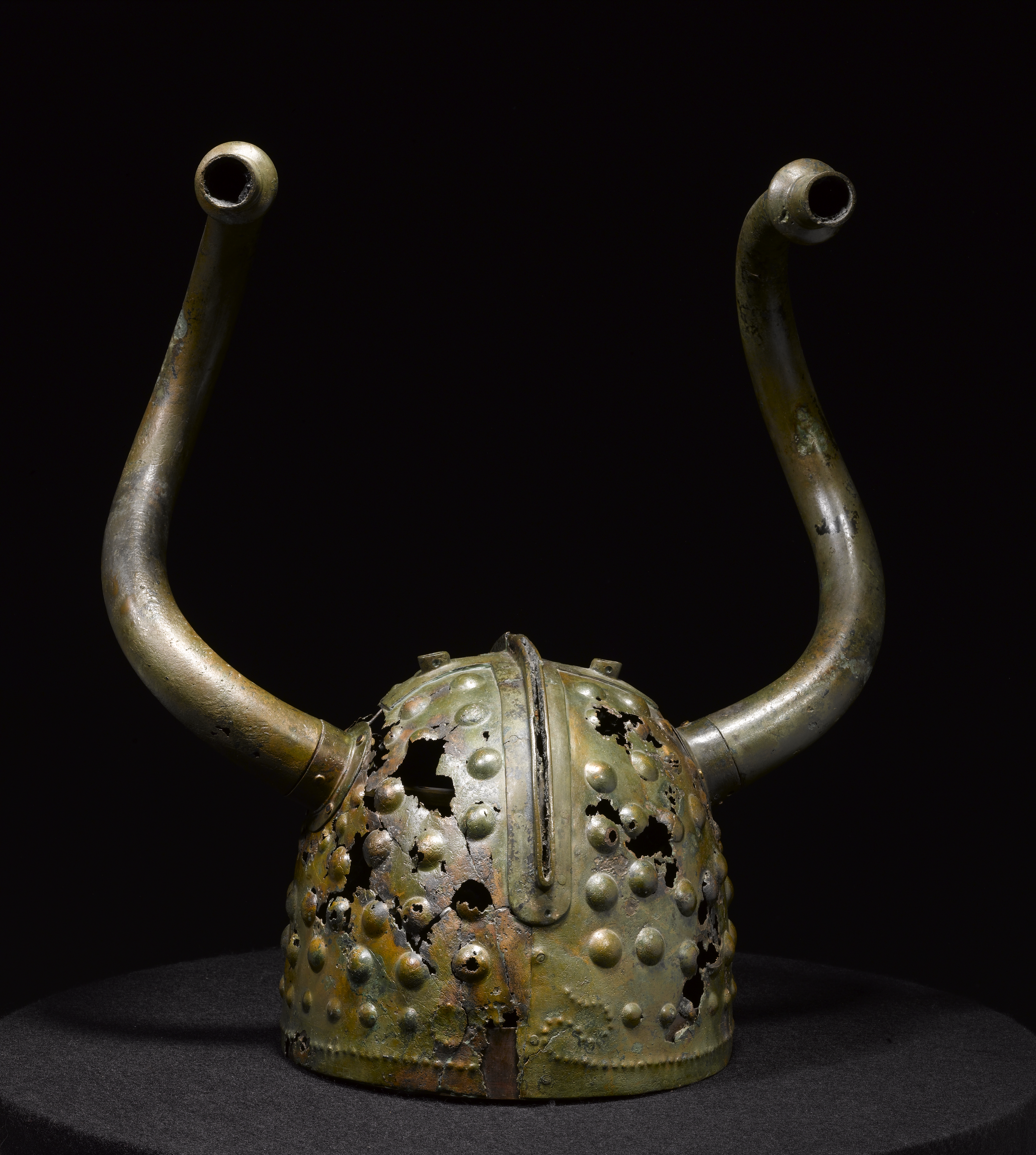
Rear of helmet

== Meaning, use, and significance ==
'Twin' helmets were found - in some interpretations of Bronze Age beliefs the sun can be represented by 'twin gods'. Other interpretations place a significance as the helmets being representation of weapons or war, or some relation to the Proto-Indo-European religion myth of Divine twins. Alternatively the helmets have been interpreted as an heirloom, or possibly conferring some status or importance when worn. Ritualistic use, either giving powers from, or connection to the animal or godly world has also been suggested.

The found position (ie in a bog or former water body) also places the final use of the helmets within the class of votive offerings.

== Similar artifacts ==
Figures of twins with horns from a similar period and region are known - these included bronze figurines wearing horned helmets found at Grevensvænge (Grevensvænge figurines), and horned twins of a horse's yoke found at Fogdarp. Related horned imagery has also been found on razors (Vestrup razor), and rock-carvings from a similar place/period.

== See also ==
- Sutton Hoo helmet, a later 7th C. AD anglo-saxon iron helmet with zoomorphic elements.
- Waterloo Helmet, La Tène style 'horned' helmet (c. 1st C. BCE) discovered in the River Thames
- Nordic Bronze Age
