= Nahanarvali =

Germanic tribe

The Nahanarvali, also known as the Nahavali, Naha-Narvali, and Nahanavali, were a Germanic tribe mentioned by the Roman scholar Tacitus in his Germania.

According to Tacitus, the Nahanarvali were one of the five most powerful tribes of the Lugii, living between the Oder and the Vistula. Tacitus mentions the Naharvali as the keepers of the sanctuary of the Lugii, a grove dedicated to the twin gods Alcis.

The text of Tacitus (Germania, 43)

Suevia is divided and cut in half by a continuous mountain-range, beyond which live a multitude of tribes. The name of Ligii, spread as it is among many states, is the most widely extended. It will be enough to mention the most powerful, which are the Harii, the Helvecones, the Manimi, the Helisii and the Nahanarvali. Among these last is shown a grove of immemorial sanctity. A priest in female attire has the charge of it. But the deities are described in Roman language as Castor and Pollux. Such, indeed, are the attributes of the divinity, the name being Alcis. They have no images, or, indeed, any vestige of foreign superstition, but it is as brothers and as youths that the deities are worshipped.	dirimit enim scinditque Suebiam continuum montium iugum, ultra quod plurimae gentes agunt, ex quibus latissime patet Lugiorum nomen in plures civitates diffusum. valentissimas nominasse sufficiet, Harios, Helveconas, Manimos, Helisios, Naharvalos. apud Naharvalos antiquae religionis lucus ostenditur. praesidet sacerdos muliebri ornatu, sed deos interpretatione Romana Castorem Pollucemque memorant. ea vis numini, nomen Alcis. nulla simulacra, nullum peregrinae superstitionis vestigium; ut fratres tamen, ut iuvenes venerantur.

While Tacitus did not mention the Silingi, nor the locations of the Nahanarvali, it has been speculated that the Silingi, known from Ptolemy, were in approximately the same area.

== See also ==
- List of Germanic peoples

== Sources ==
- Tacitus, Germania.XLIII
