= Winged helmet =

Helmet decorated with wings, usually on both sides

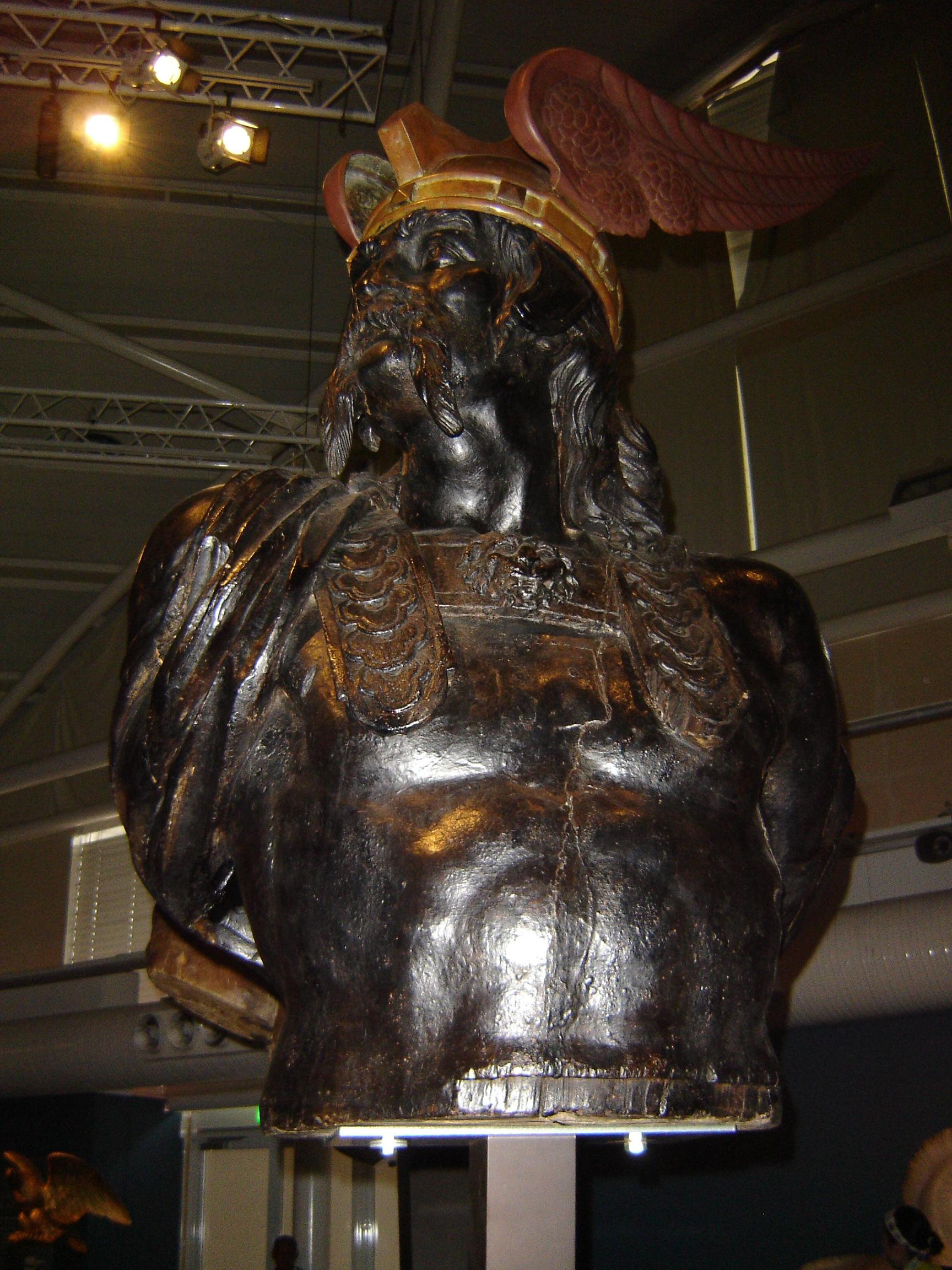
A 19th-century ship's figurehead depicting Brennus wearing a winged helmet

A winged helmet is a helmet decorated with wings, usually one on each side. Ancient depictions of the god Hermes, Mercury and of Roma depict them wearing winged helmets, and in the 19th century the winged helmet became widely used to depict the Celts. It was also used in romantic illustrations of legendary Norse gods and heroes. The motif, along with the horned helmet, became a clichéd signifier of the Northern warrior.

== Historical evidence ==
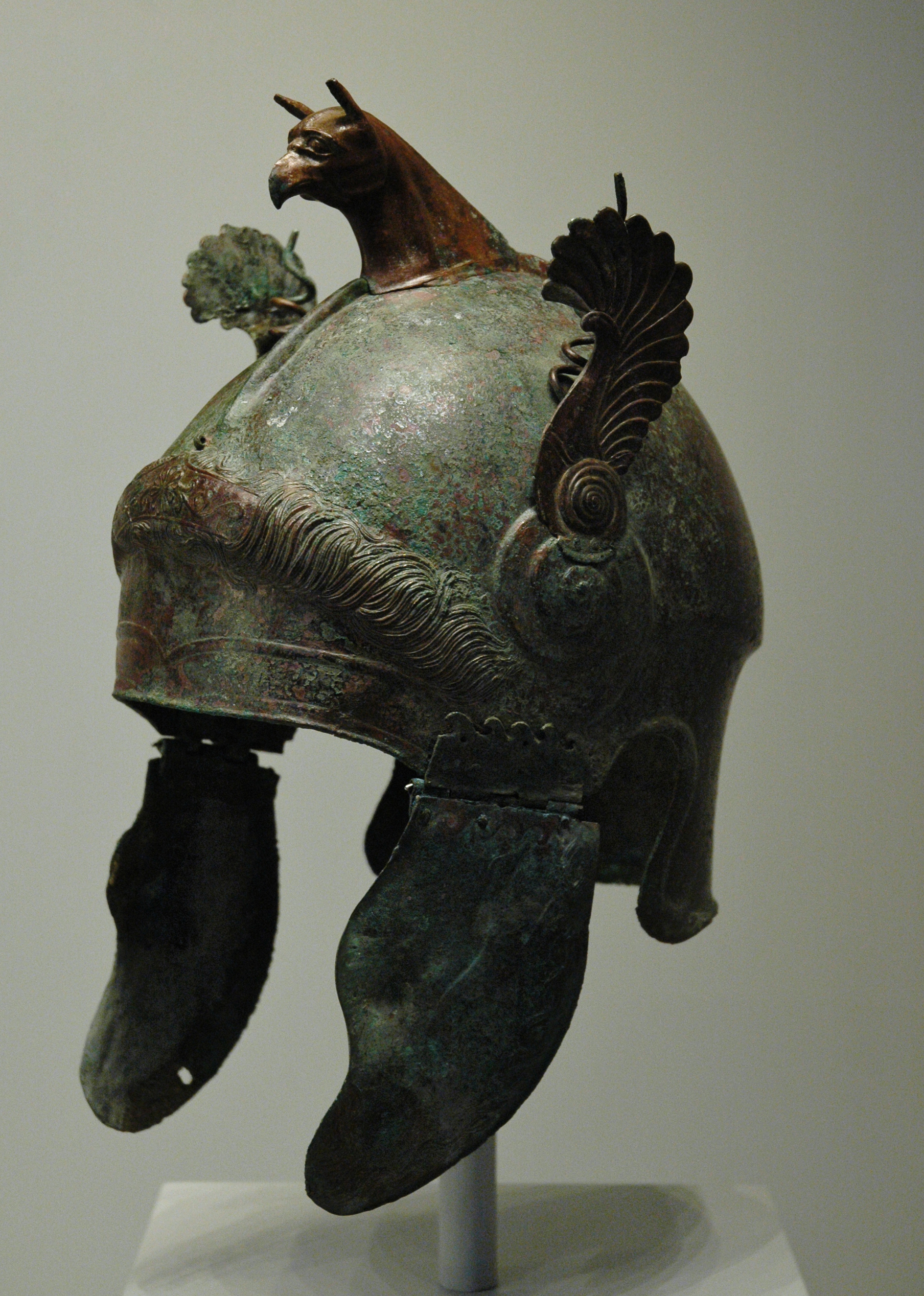
Attic helmet with small bronze decorative wings, Southern Italy 4th Century BC

There is some limited evidence of such decorative motifs being used on actual helmets in the ancient world, but these may have functioned as ceremonial rather than functional objects. Attic helmets decorated with wings of sheet bronze were worn by the Samnites and other Italic peoples before their conquest by the Roman Republic. A number of such helmets have been excavated and can be seen in various museums.

Helmets decorated with animal motifs, no doubt including wings, were described by Diodorus Siculus as being worn by Celts:

On their heads they wear bronze helmets which possess large projecting figures lending the appearance of enormous stature to the wearer. In some cases, horns form one part with the helmet, while in other cases it is relief figures of the foreparts of birds or quadrupeds.

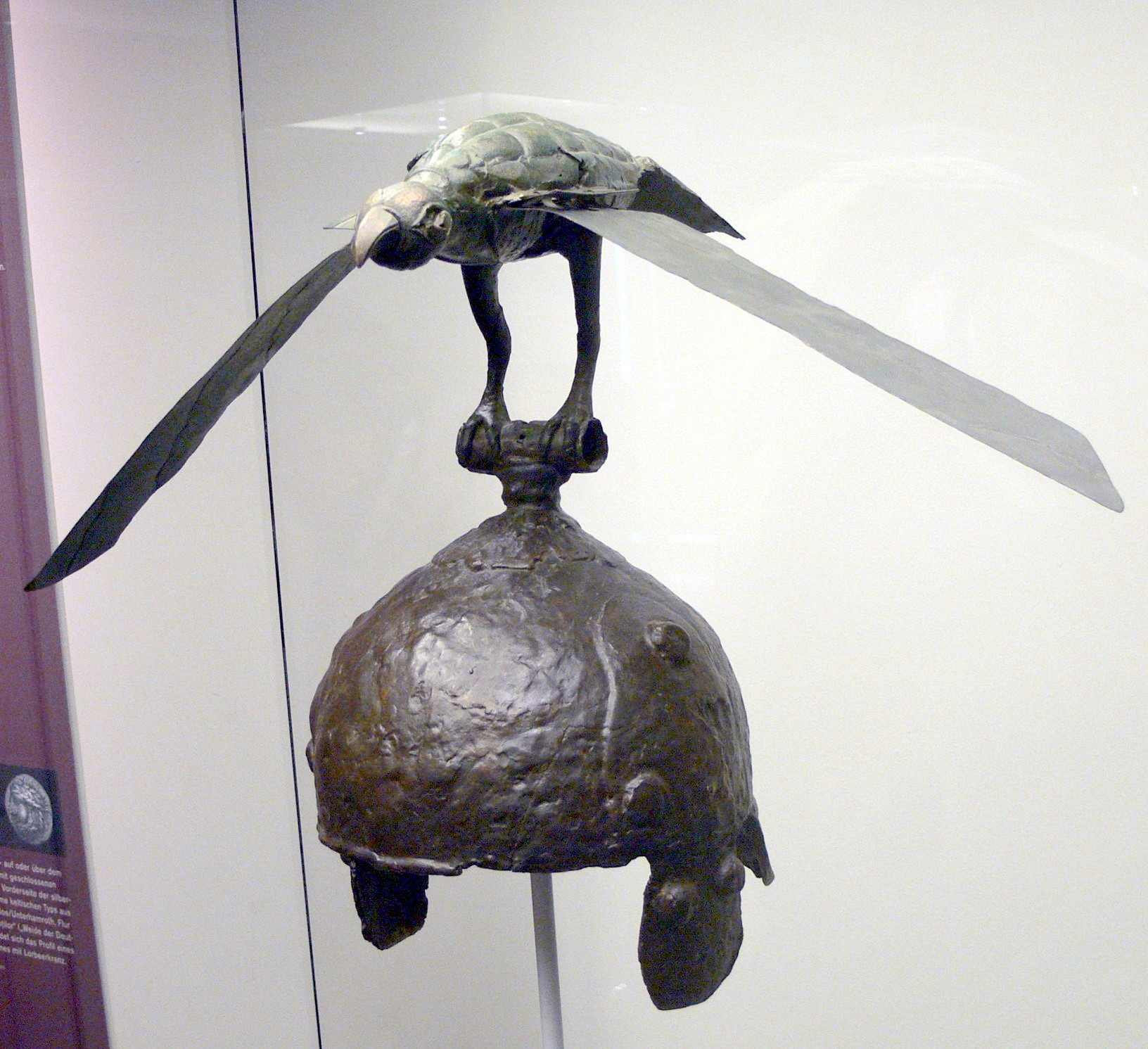
Celtic helmet with a complete winged-bird crest from the 3rd century BC, found at Ciumesti, Romania

An actual example of this type of Celtic helmet was discovered in Romania, dating to the third century BC: it has a high-mounted crest formed as a bird, possibly an eagle or a raven, with large wings spread out to either side. The crest was cunningly made, the wings articulated at the body so that they would have flapped up and down as the wearer moved. Today this kind of helmet is commonly believed to have been worn by the Celts. The Celts, however, mostly wore plainer helmets of conical or sub-conical shape, such as the 'Montefortino' type later adopted by the Romans.

The ancient depictions of Mercury with a winged helmet are taken to symbolize speed. In modern comic book mythology, this has evolved into the wings present in the helmet or head-portion of the costume of various versions of The Flash, Captain America, and Thor. Another famous comic character who always wears a winged helmet is Asterix, after the inspiration by various modern paintings and sculptures of the Gallic chieftain Vercingetorix.

Vendel Period helmets from Sweden often feature bird-motifs. On these helmets, however, there is a stylized noseguard or more often a winged man whose wings form "eye-brows" around the eye holes of the helmets.

== See also ==
- Petasos
- Golden hat
- Pointed hat

== Bibliography ==
- Connolly, P. (1981) Greece and Rome at War. Macdonald Phoebus, London. ISBN 1-85367-303-X
