= Horned helmet =

Helmet with horns

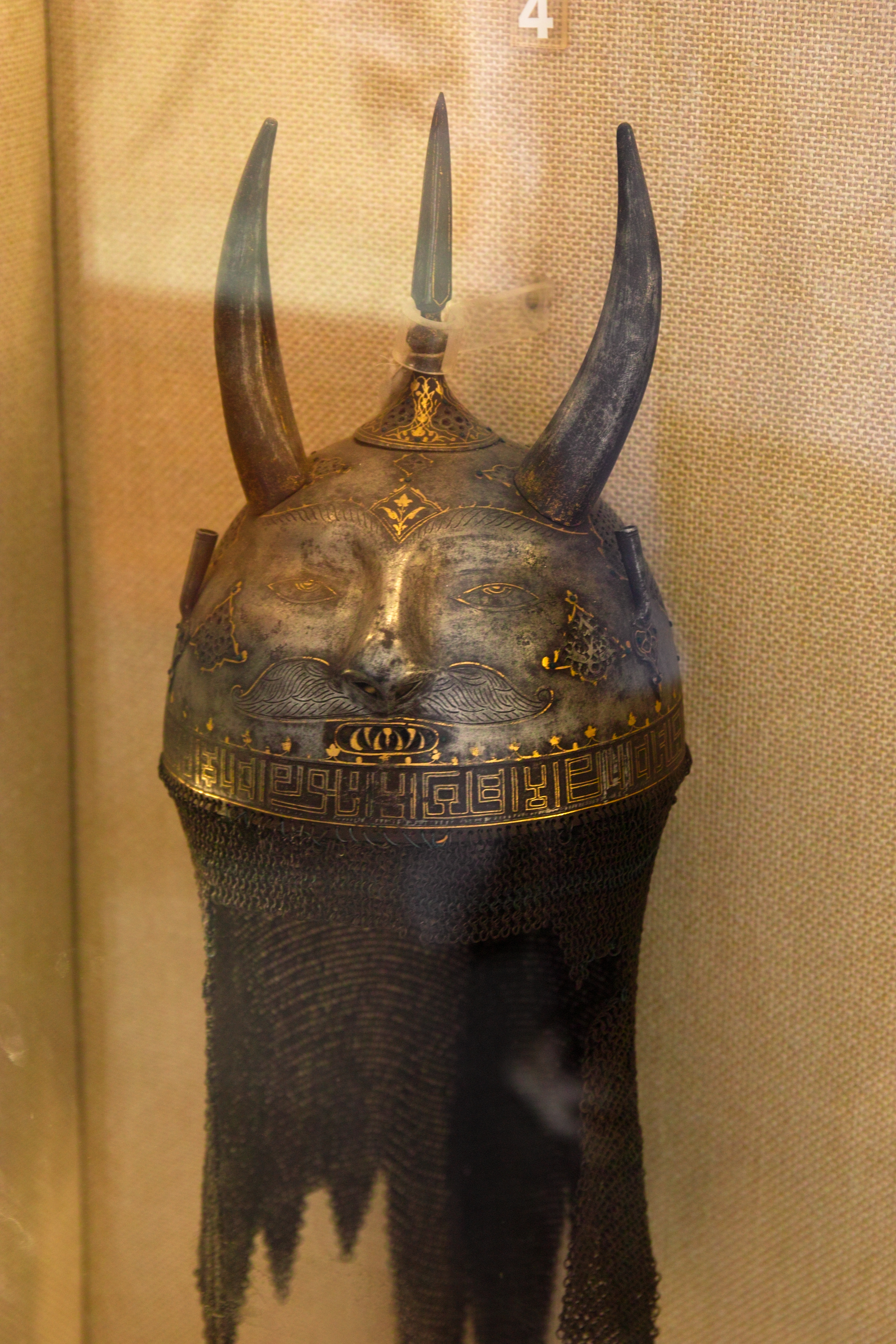
Persian pre-Islamic horned kulah khud with a demon face.

Horned helmets were worn by many people around the world. Headpieces mounted with animal horns or replicas were also worn since ancient history, as in the Mesolithic Star Carr Frontlets. Much of the evidence for these helmets and headpieces comes from depictions rather than the items themselves.

== Prehistoric Middle East & Cyprus ==
Horned hats have been used to signify deities in Mesopotamia and Cyprus, and also kings, as seen on the Victory Stele of Naram-Sin. More horns signified higher importance.

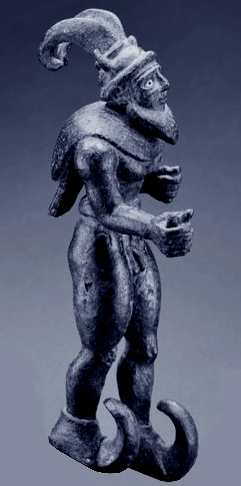
Near Eastern horned deity copper statuette (proto-Elamite 3000–2800 BC)

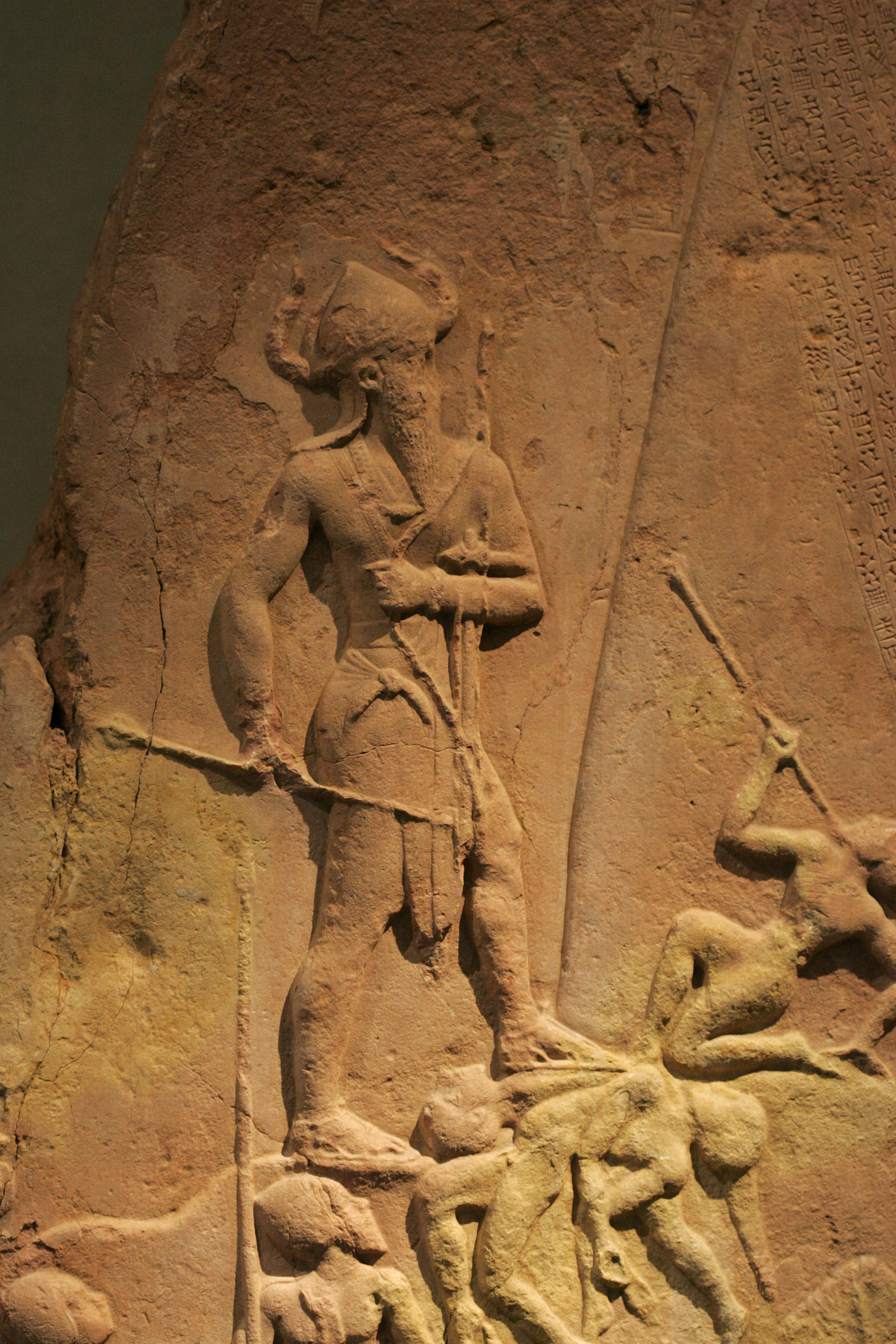
King Naram-Sin on the Victory Stele of Naram-Sin (2254–2218 BC).

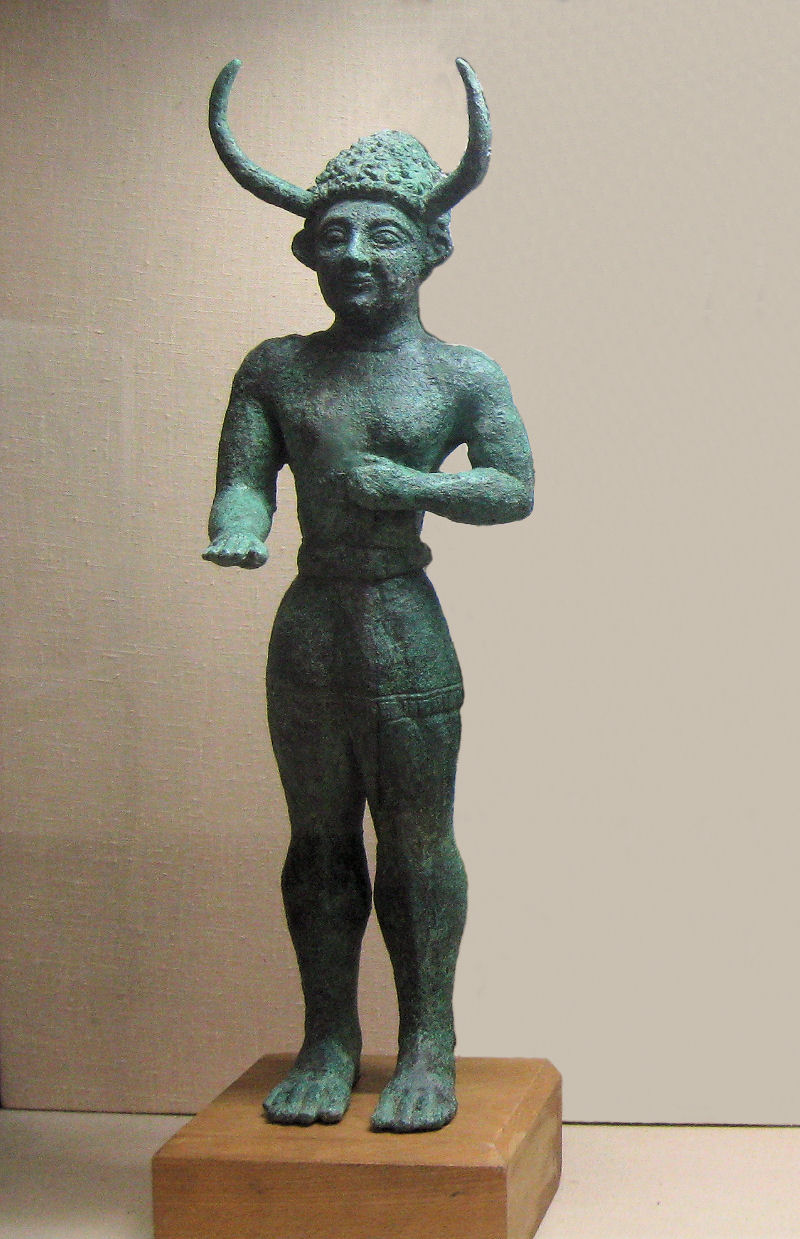
Bronze "Horned God" from Enkomi (12th century BC), Cyprus Archaeological Museum, Nicosia.

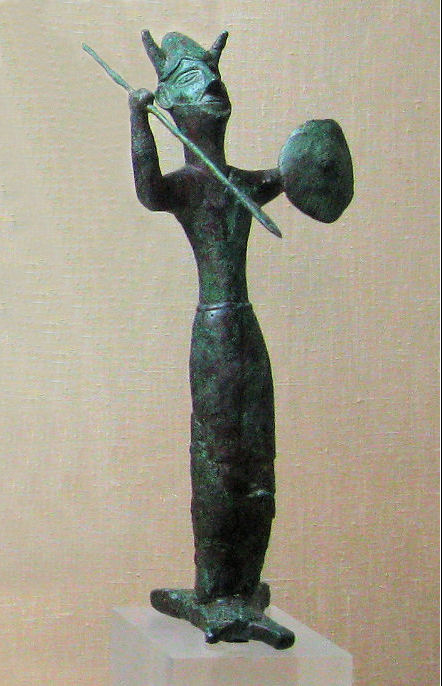
Bronze "Ingot God" from Enkomi (12th century BC), Cyprus Archaeological Museum, Nicosia.

== Europe ==
=== Prehistoric Europe ===
Two bronze statuettes dated to the early 12th century BC, the so-called "horned god" and "ingot god", found in Enkomi, Cyprus have horned helmets. In Sardinia warriors with horned helmets are depicted in dozens of bronze figures and in the Mont'e Prama giant statues, similar to those of the Shardana warriors (and possibly belonging to the same people) depicted by the Egyptians.

A pair of bronze horned helmets, the Veksø helmets, from the later Bronze Age (dating to c. 1100-900 BC) were found near Veksø, Denmark, in 1942. Another early find is the Grevensvænge hoard from Zealand, Denmark, (c. 800–500 BC, now partially lost).

The Waterloo Helmet, a Celtic bronze ceremonial helmet with repoussé decoration in the La Tène style, dating to c. 150–50 BC, was found in the River Thames, at London. Its abstracted 'horns', different from those of the earlier finds, are straight and conical. Late Gaulish helmets (c. 55 BC) with small horns and adorned with wheels, reminiscent of the combination of a horned helmet and a wheel on plate C of the Gundestrup cauldron (c. 100 BC), were found in Orange, France. Other Celtic helmets, especially from Eastern Europe, had bird crests. The enigmatic Torrs Pony-cap and Horns from Scotland appears to be a horned champron to be worn by a horse.

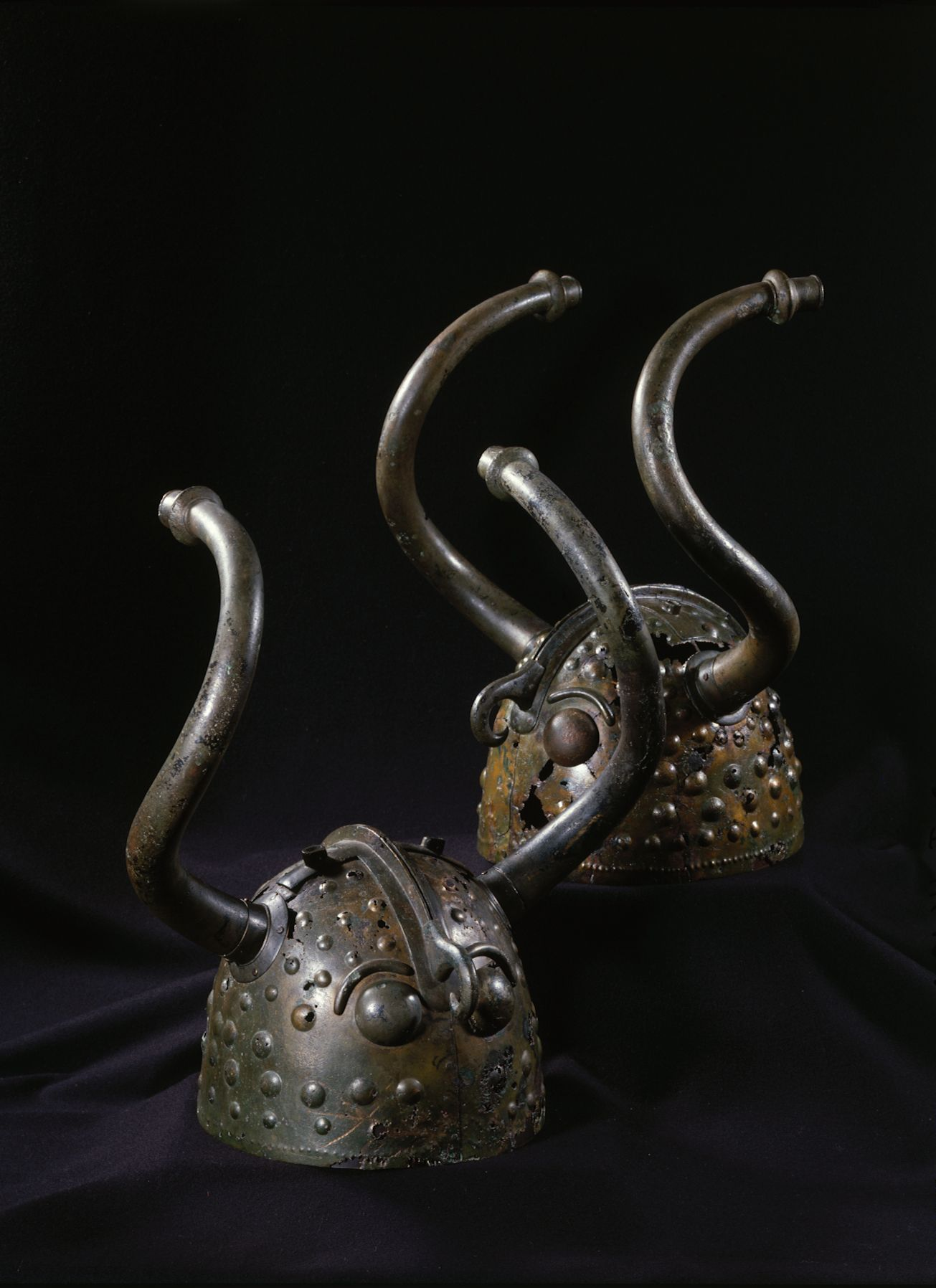
The Veksø horned helmets, from the later Bronze Age (c. 1100-900 BC).

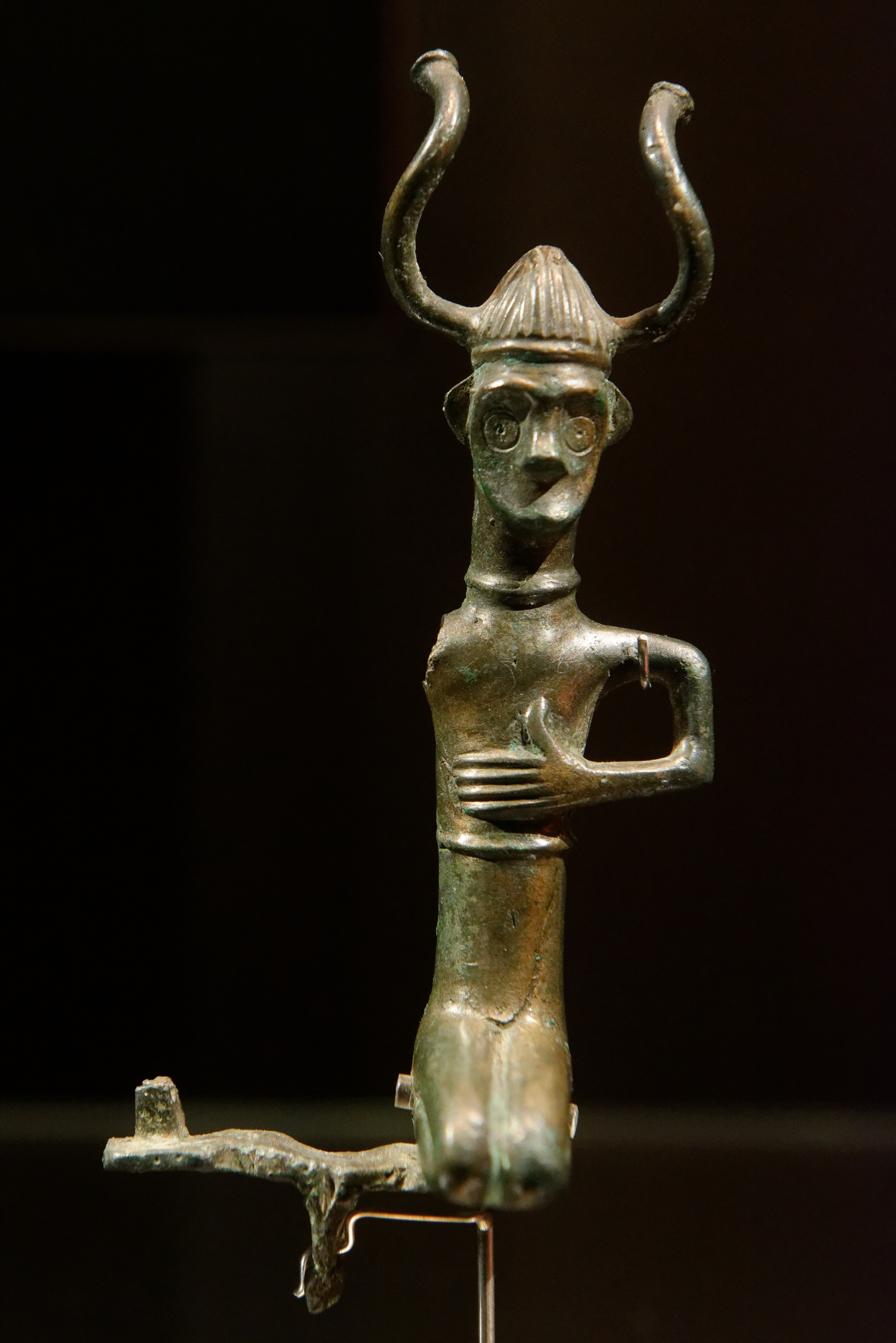
Horned helmet bronze figurine (c. 8th century BC), Denmark.

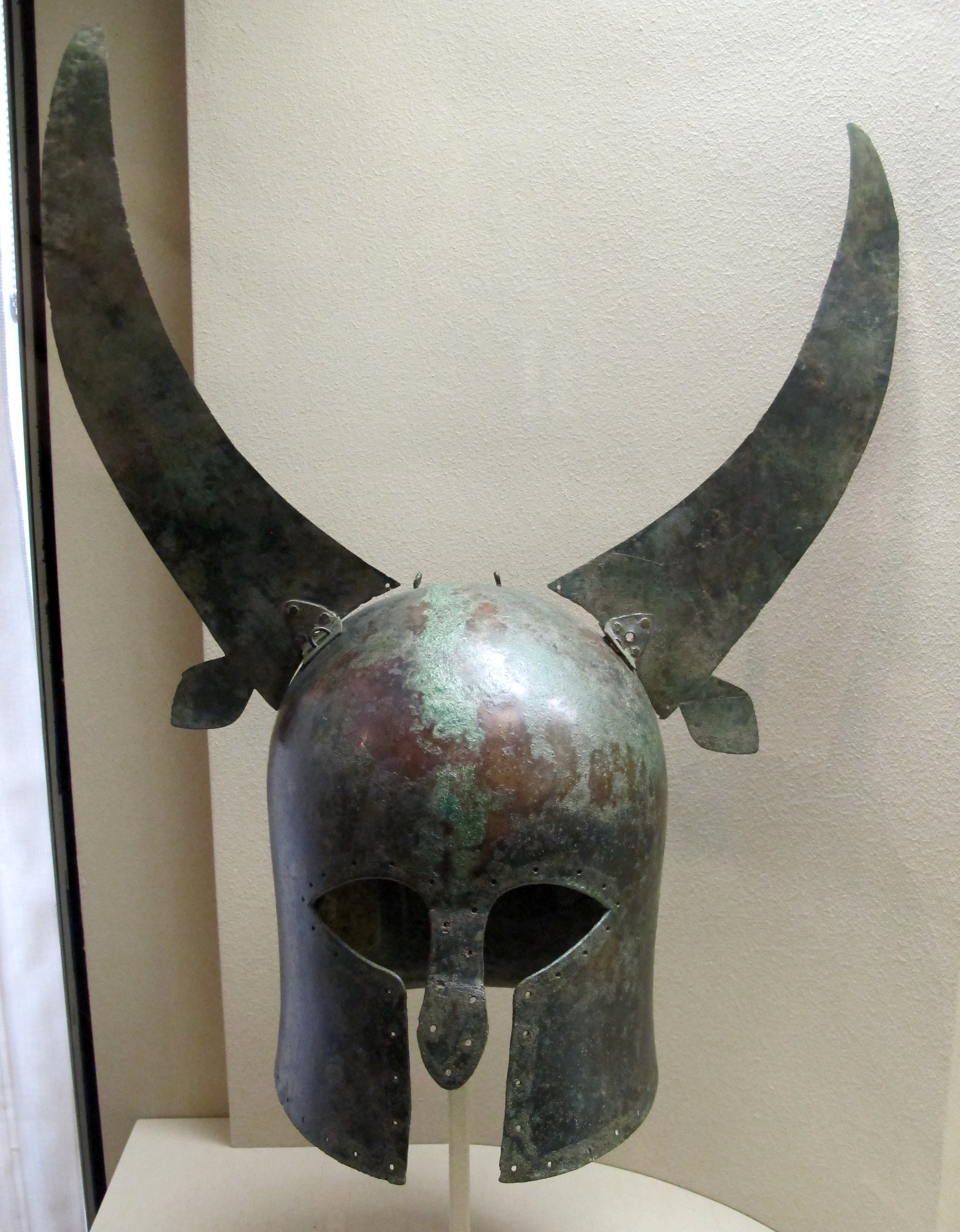
Taranto (perhaps), horned Corinthian helmet (c. 650 BC).

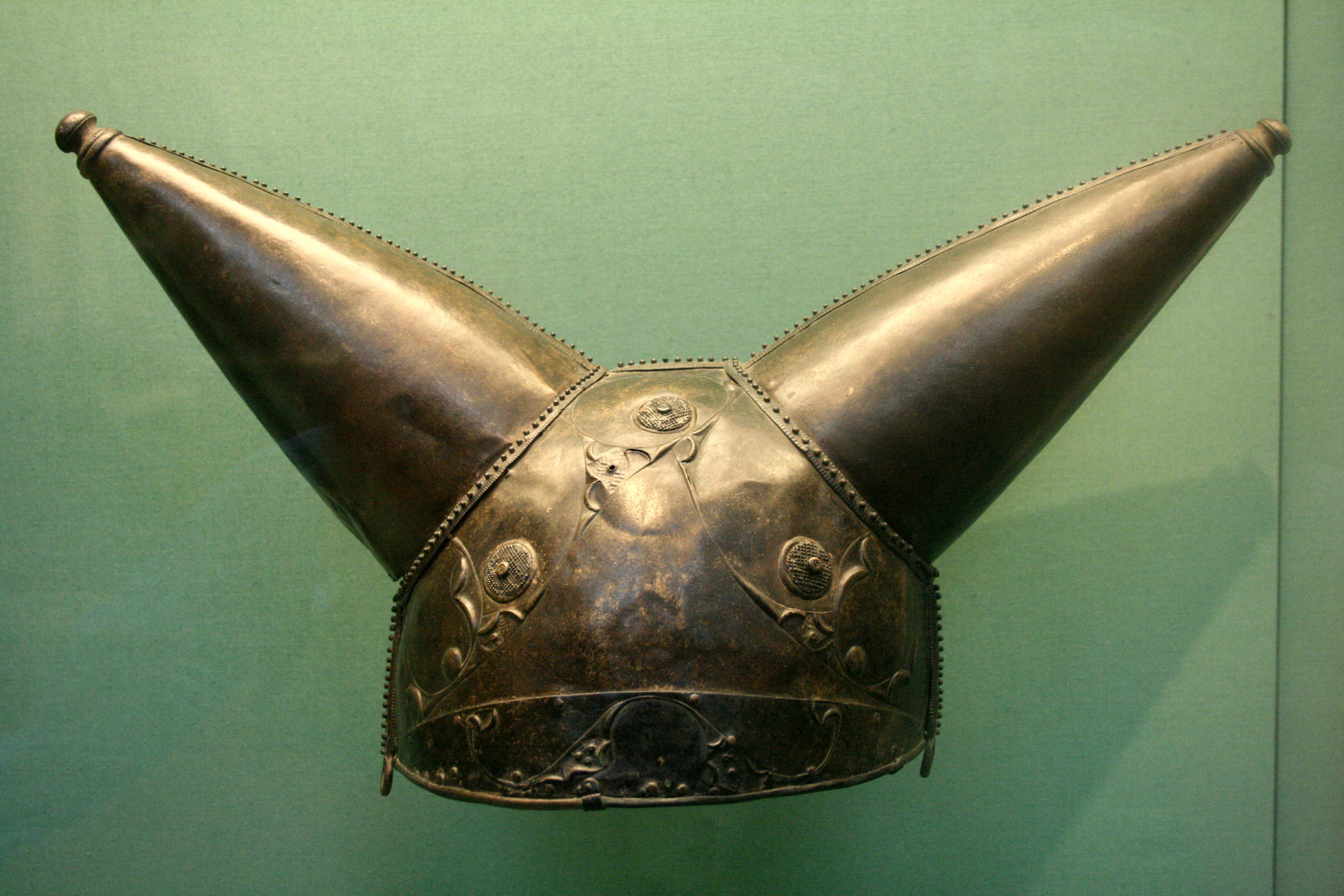
The Waterloo Helmet (c. 150–50 BC), Thames, England.

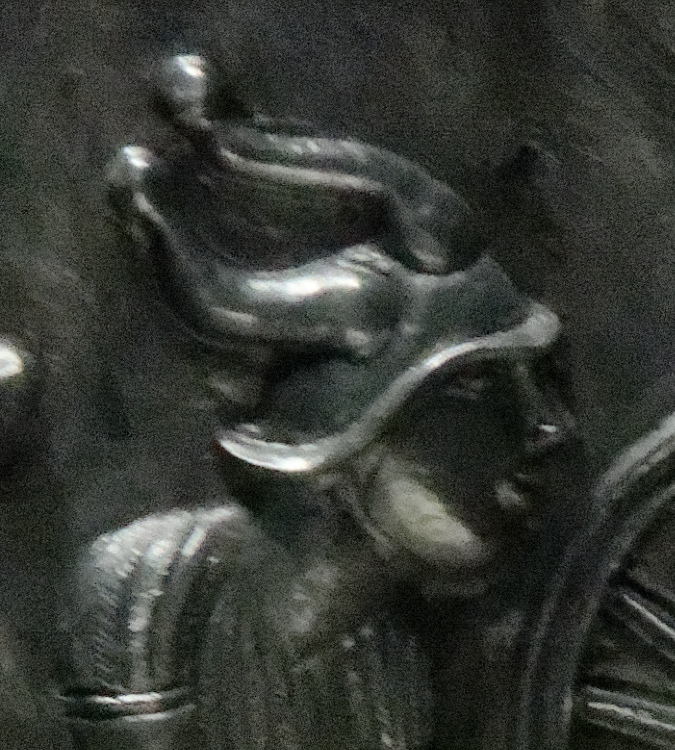
Horned helmet figure on plate C of the Gundestrup cauldron (2nd–1st century BC).

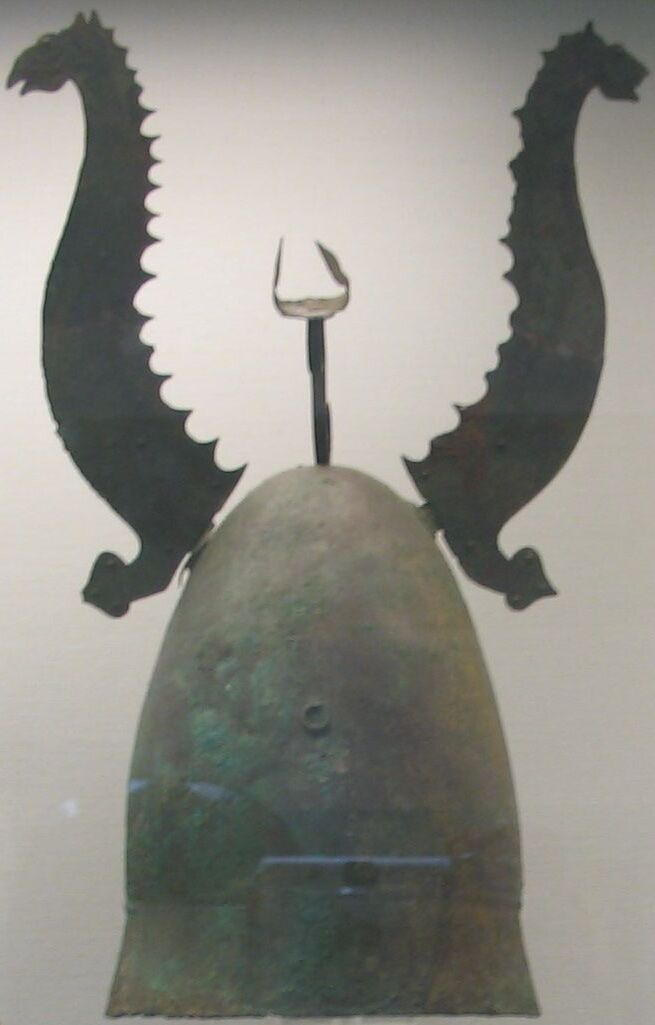
Horned bronze gladiator helmet.

=== European Migration Period ===
Depicted on the Arch of Constantine, dedicated in AD 315, are Germanic soldiers, sometimes identified as "Cornuti", shown wearing horned helmets. On the relief representing the Battle of Verona (312) they are in the first lines, and they are depicted fighting with the bowmen in the relief of the Battle of the Milvian Bridge.

A depiction on a Migration Period (5th century) metal die from Öland, Sweden, shows a warrior with a helmet adorned with two snakes, or dragons, arranged in a manner similar to horns. Decorative plates of the Sutton Hoo helmet (c. AD 600) depict spear-carrying dancing men wearing horned helmets, similar to a figure seen on one of the Torslunda plates from Sweden. Also, a pendant from Ekhammar in Uppland, features the same figure in the same pose and an 8th century find in Staraya Ladoga (a Norse trading outpost at the time) shows an object with similar headgear. An engraved belt-buckle found during excavations by Sonia Chadwick Hawkes in a 7th century grave at Finglesham, Kent in 1964 bears the image of a naked warrior standing between two spears wearing a belt and a horned helmet; a case has been made (Note: Simpson (1979) notes that Sidgewick (1939) had related the Long Man to the Torslunda plate before Anglo-Saxon and Swedish connections had been fully demonstrated.) that the much-repaired chalk figure called the "Long Man of Wilmington", East Sussex, repeats this iconic motif, and originally wore a similar cap, of which only the drooping lines of the neckguard remain. This headgear, of which only depictions have survived, seems to have mostly fallen out of use with the end of the Migration period. Some have suggested that the figure in question does not portray actual headgear, but a mythological object of a god like Odin. A one-eyed figure with similar headgear was found at the site of Uppåkra temple, an alleged center of an Odinic-cult activity. A similar figurine from Levide, Gotland, lacked an eye, apparently removed after its completion. This would link the headgear as a mythological representations rather than depictions of actual helmets. Note that the similar crests to the animal figures on the helmets of the warrior's depicted on the Sutton Hoo helmet has been demonstrated on helmets from Valsgärde, but the depicted crests where grossly exaggerated.

Figures with bird-horned helmets from the Sutton Hoo helmet (c. 7th century).

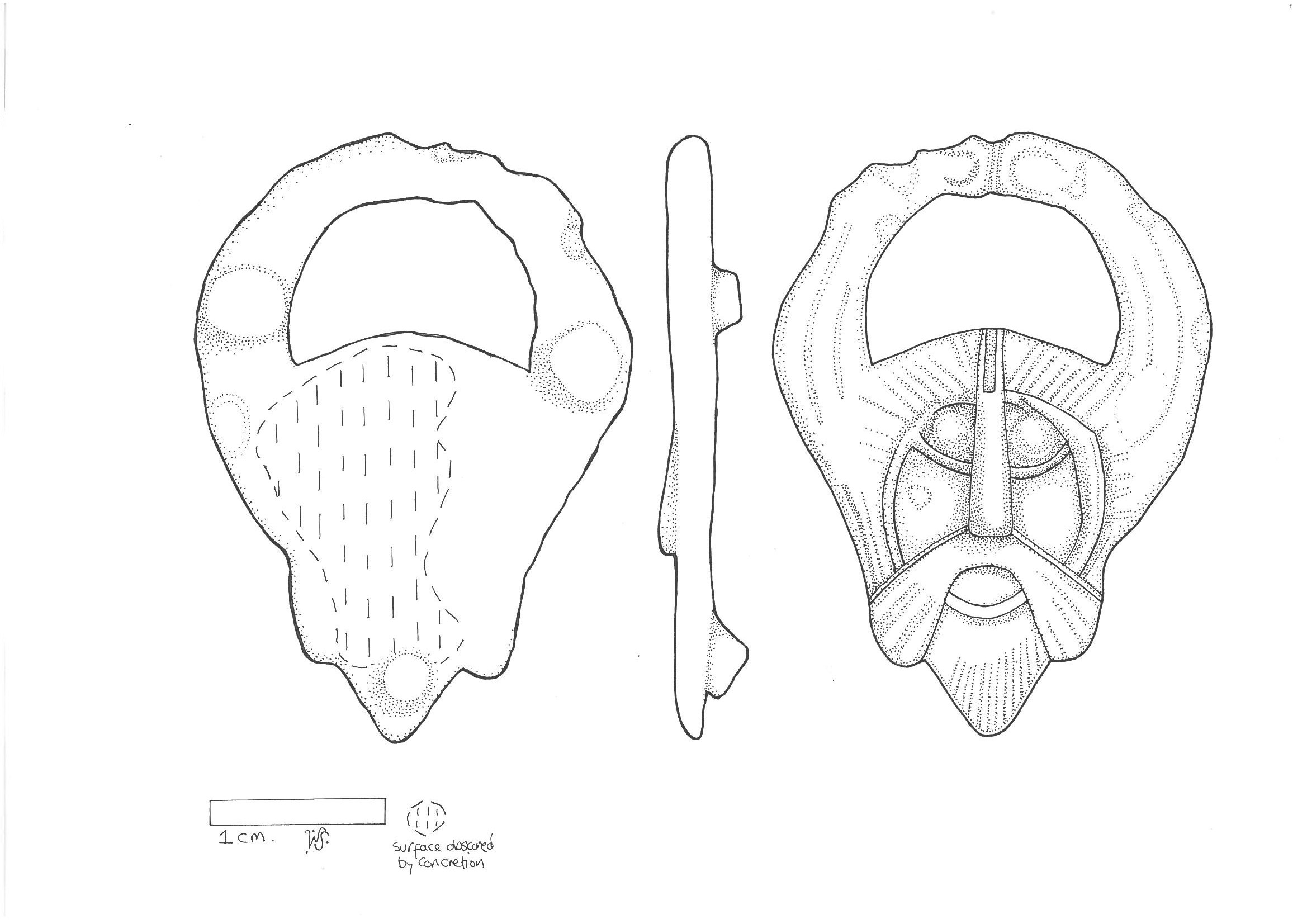
Early Anglo-Saxon gilded copper-alloy mount of bird-horned helmet figure (c. 7th century).

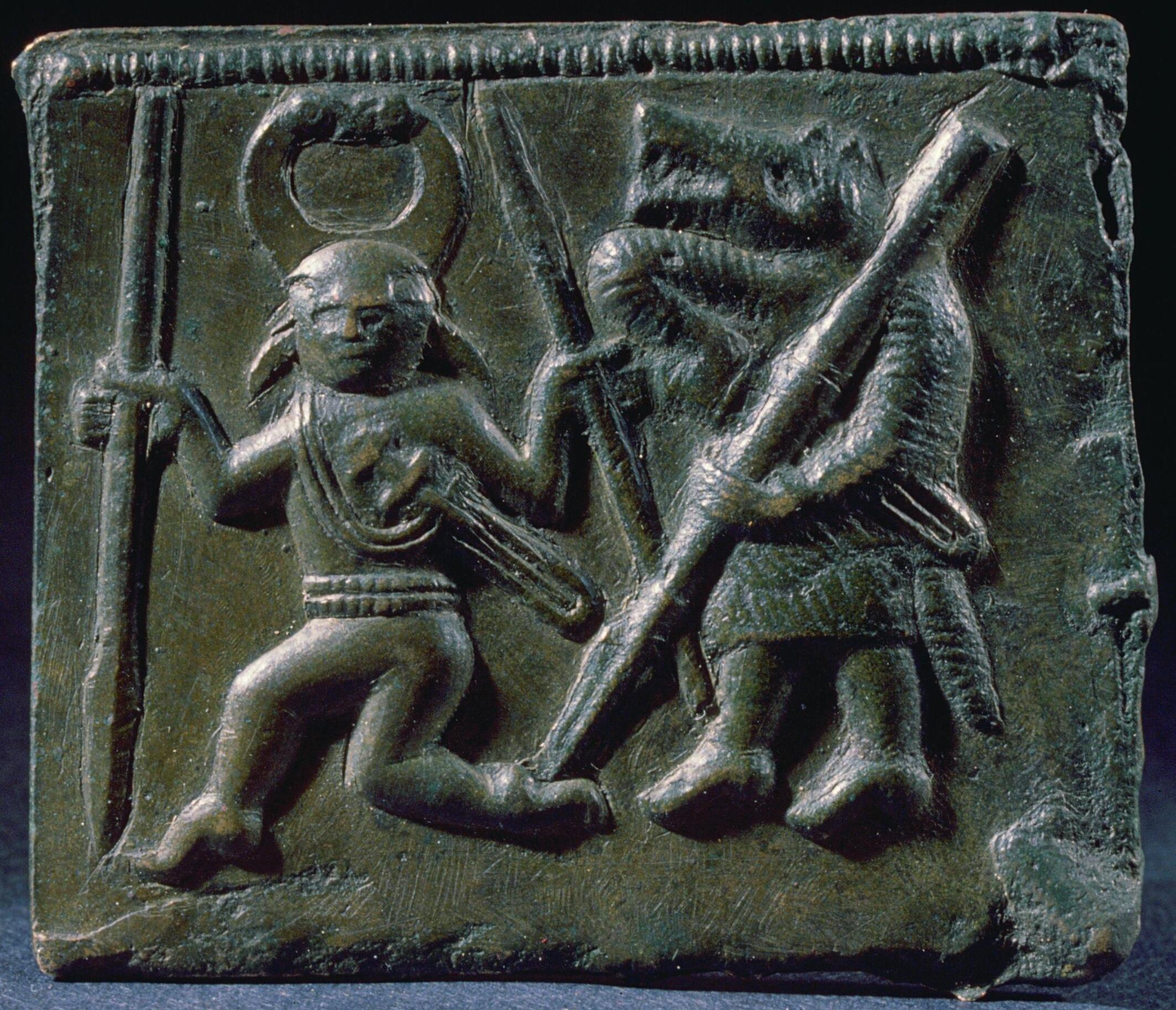
Bird-horned helmet figure on one of the Torslunda plates (c. 7th century).

=== European Middle Ages ===
During the High Middle Ages, fantastical headgear became popular among knights, in particular for tournaments. (Note: See the depiction of Wolfram von Eschenbach, and others, in the Codex Manesse.) The achievements or representations of some coats of arms, for example that of Lazar Hrebeljanovic, depict them, but they rarely appear as charges depicted within the arms themselves. It is sometimes argued that helmets with large protuberances would not have been worn in battle due to the impediment to their wearer. However, impractical adornments have been worn on battlefields throughout history.

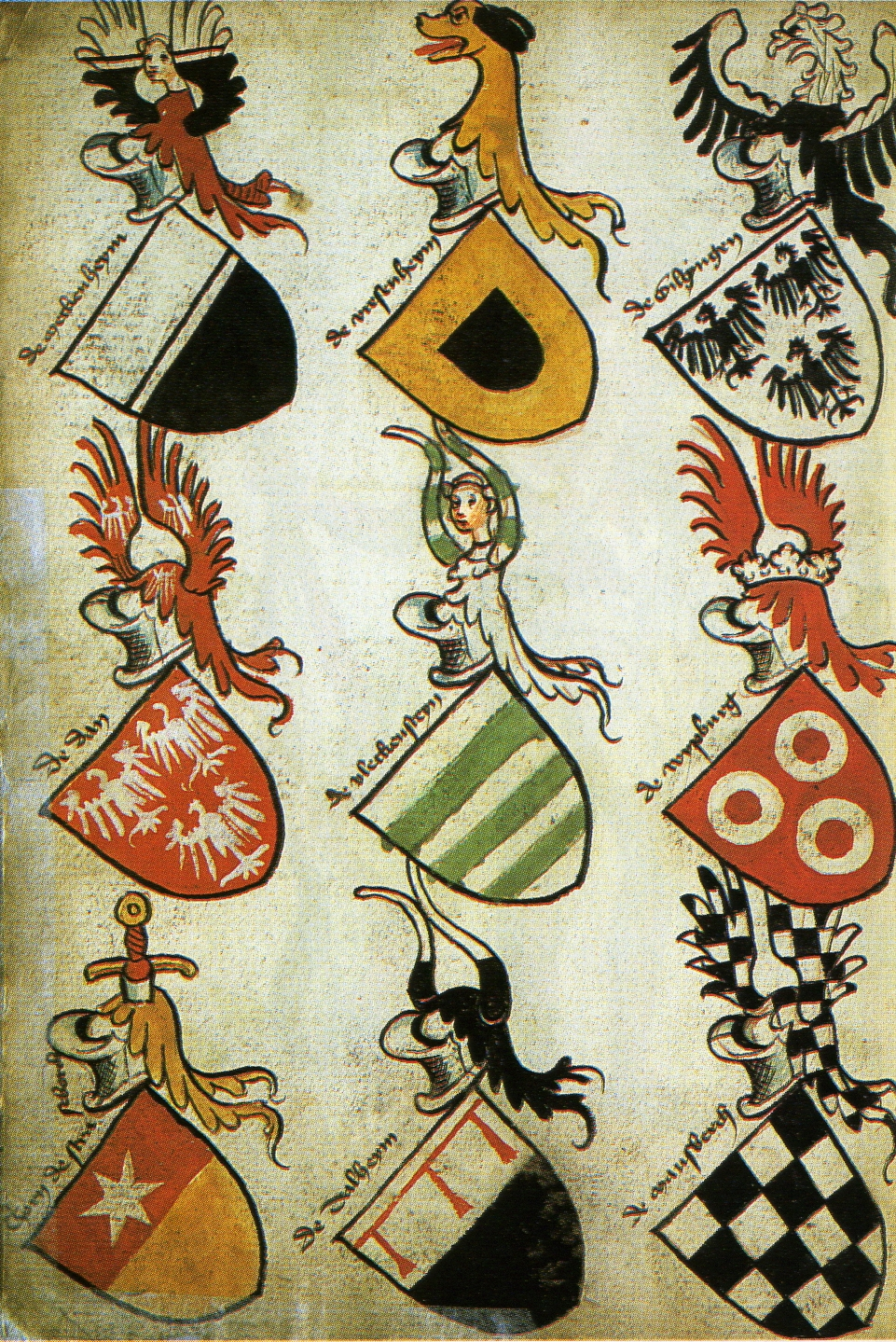
The German Hyghalmen Roll, c. late 15th century, illustrates both winged helmets and a horned helm crests in the arms of Dalheim, bottom row.

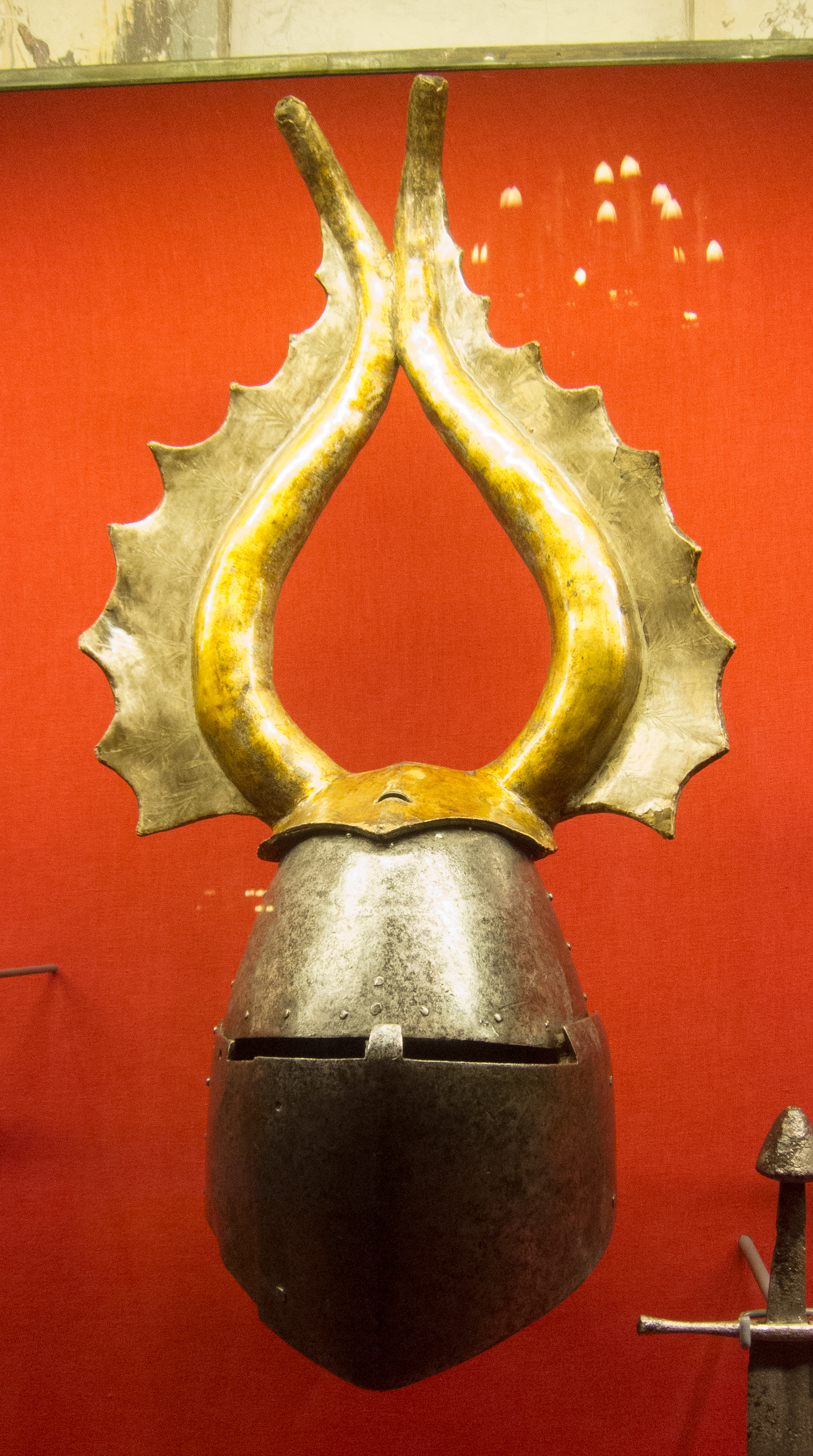
Great helm of Albert von Pranckh, 14th century, showing the style often used by the Teutonic order.

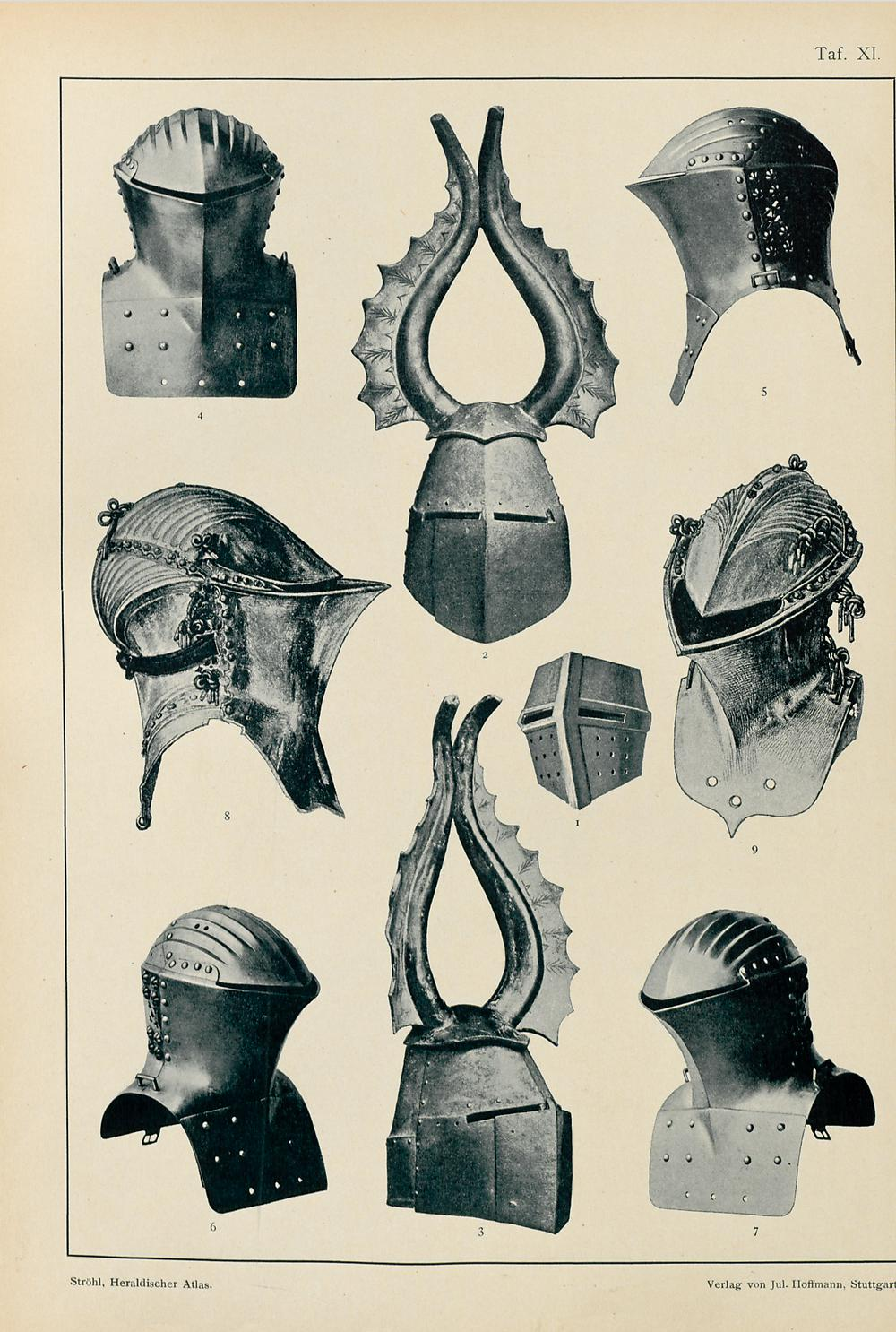
Some horned great helms depicted among jousting frog-mouth helms.

Coat of arms of medieval Danish King Valdemar the Restorer depicting horns on his metal helmet.

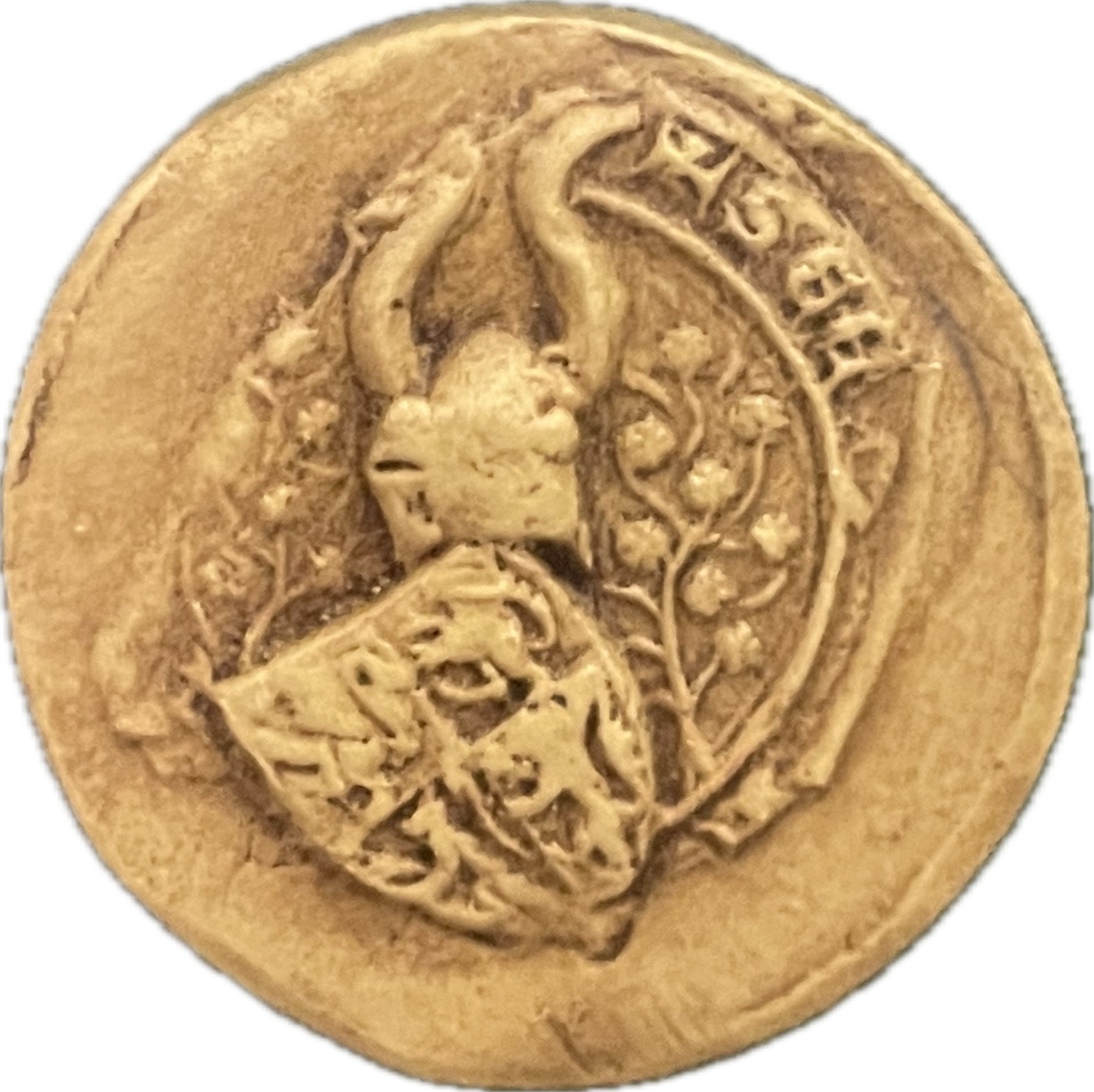
Impression of a 14th century seal used by Welsh prince Owain Lawgoch (1330 – 1378), it depicts a horned helmet on top of four rampant lions which represented the Kingdom of Gwynedd.

== In Asia ==
In pre-Meiji Restoration Japan, some Samurai armor incorporated a horned, plumed or crested helmet. These horns, used to identify military commanders on the battlefield, could be cast from metal, or made from genuine water buffalo horns.

Indo-Persian warriors often wore horned or spiked helmets in battle to intimidate their enemies. These conical "devil masks" were made from plated mail, and usually had eyes engraved on them.

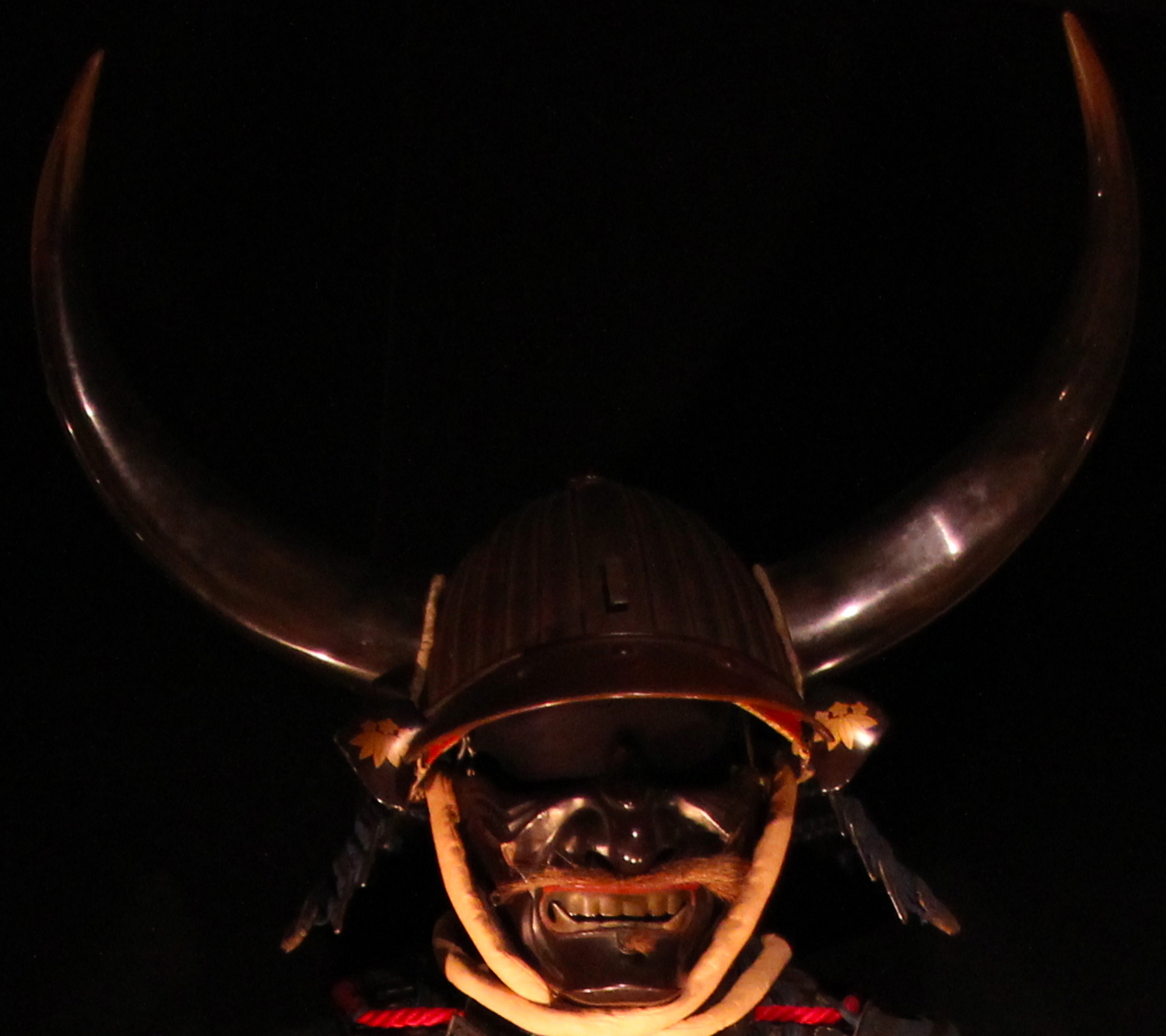
Japanese kabuto with buffalo horns.

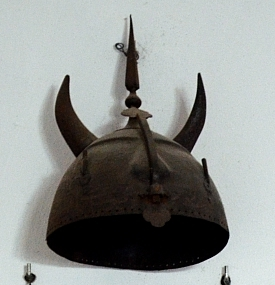
Indo-Persian Devil Mask, cuirass and scimitar.

== Popular association with Vikings ==
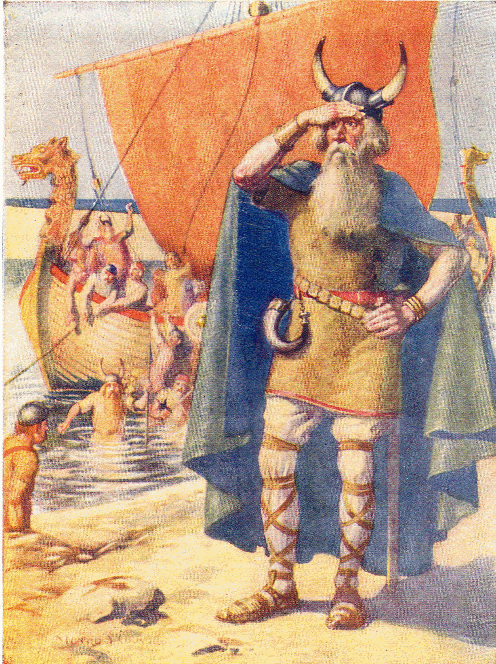
Fantasy Viking with horned helmet, 1908 depiction.

Viking warriors are often associated with horned helmets in popular culture, but this is merely a modern association starting in the 1800s, initially popularized by the Norse operas of Richard Wagner, which depicted horns and wings on the helmets of the Vikings.

Contemporary Viking Age texts and stories regularly mention helmets, but never mention horned headgear. Christian writers, who were keen to portray the Vikings as barbaric and uncivilized, did not mention horns. The few period helmets found thus far do not feature horns, instead coinciding with the construction of earlier Vendel Period spectacle helmets. The helmet descriptions found in the period epic poem Beowulf also coincide with the Vendel era helmets, as well as earlier Germanic boar helmets, which also lack horns. The only find of Scandinavian horned helmets are the Bronze Age Veksø Helmets and depictions of ceremonial "bird horned" headgear on Migration Period trinkets – see § European Migration Period. Historians generally believe that if horned headgear existed during the Viking Age, it was not worn regularly. This misconception has been debunked repeatedly by historians and archaeologists, but it persists widely in pop culture due to its strong visual symbolism.

== Gallery ==
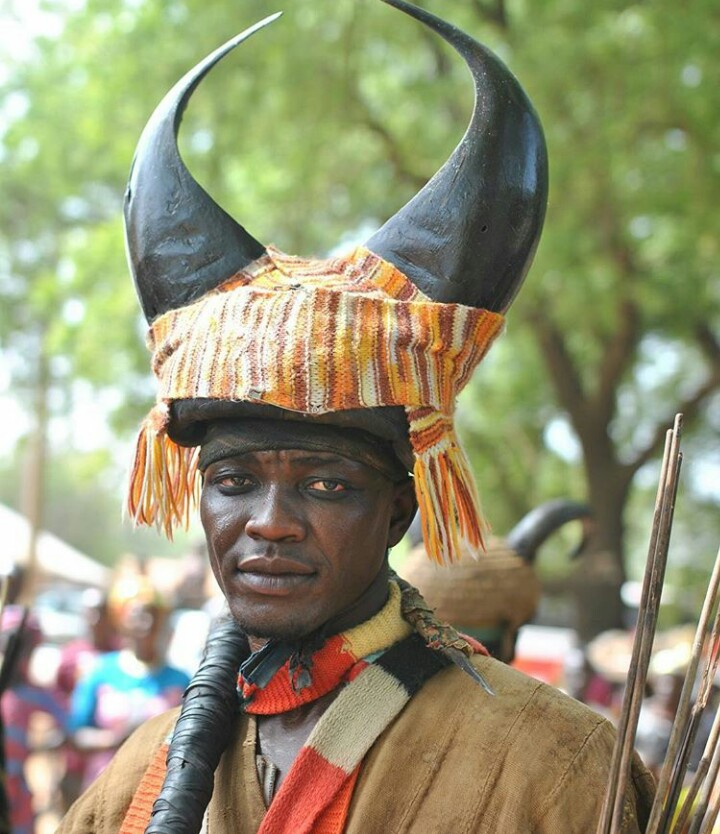
Man in horned helmet, Ghana

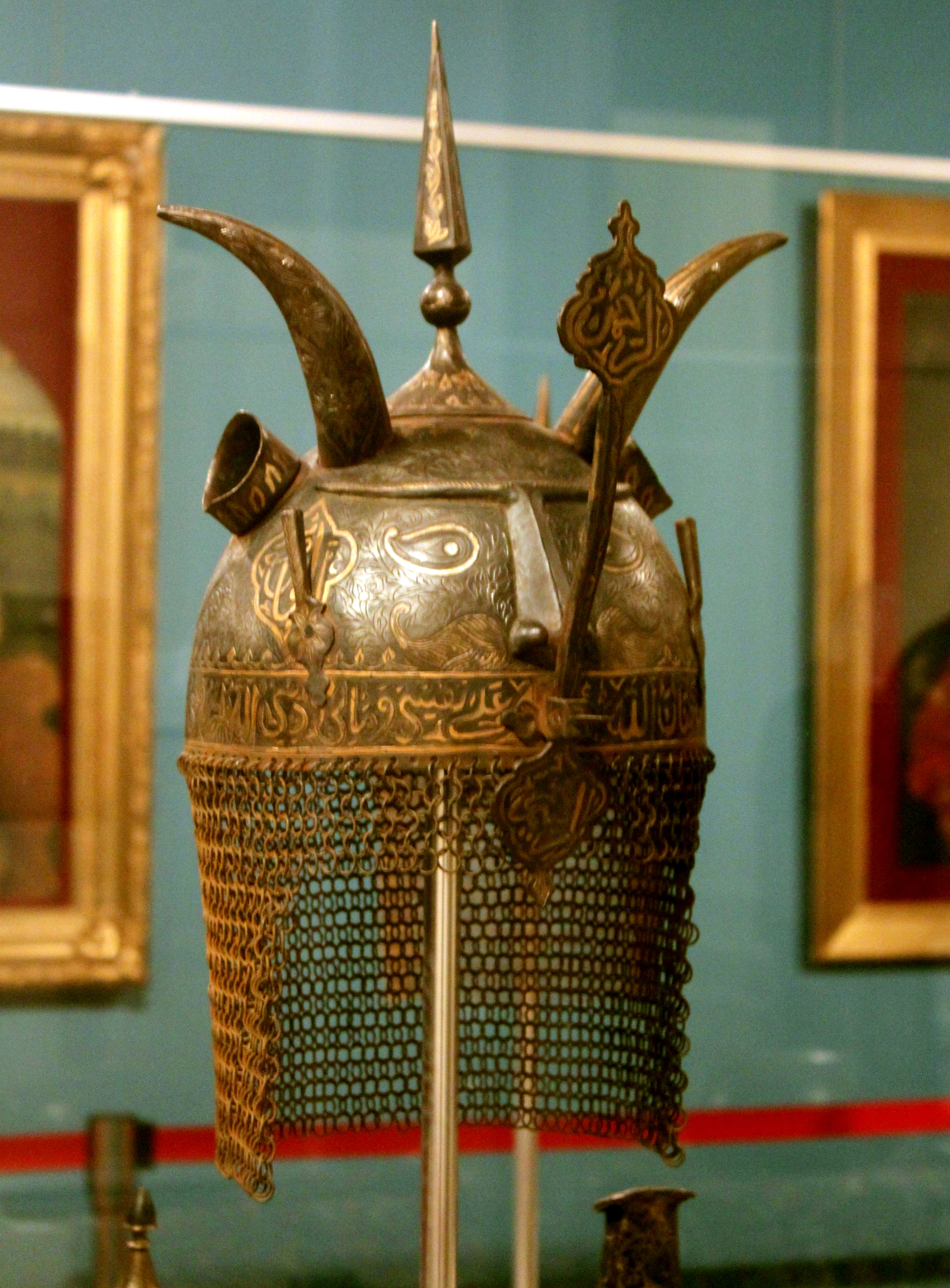
Horned medieval Oghuz Turkic helmet, Azerbaijan

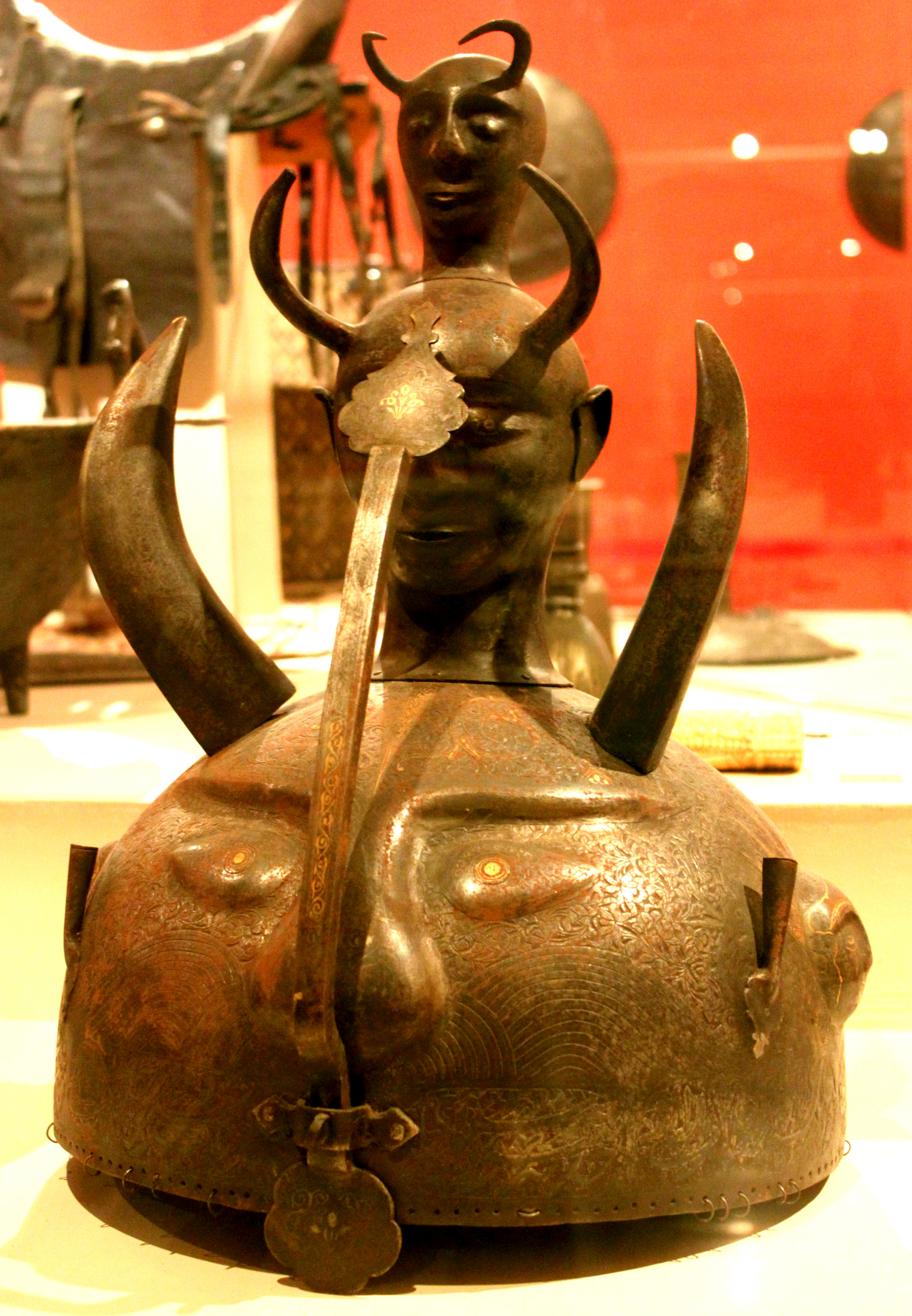
Horned medieval Oghuz Turkic helmet, Azerbaijan

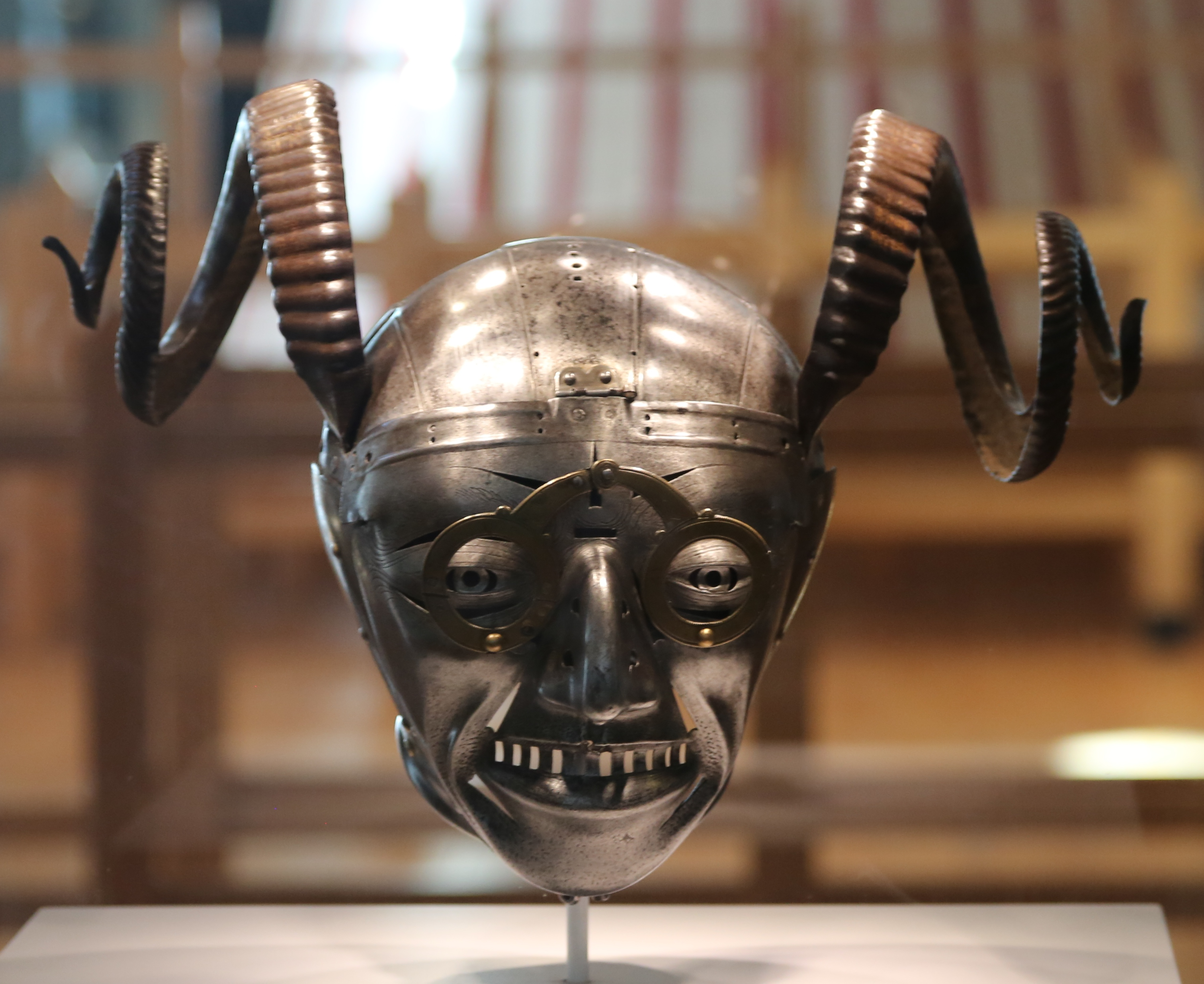
Horned helmet of Henry VIII, Royal Armouries Museum

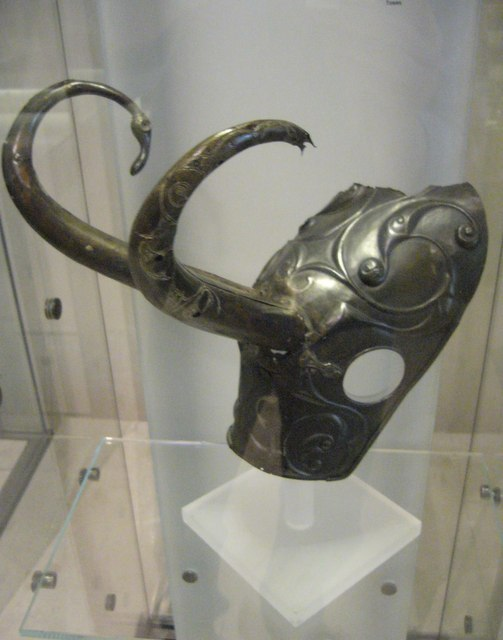
Celtic horned horse helmet, National Museum of Scotland

== See also ==
- Golden hat
- Horned God
- Pickelhaube
- Pointed hat
- Winged helmet
