= Grevensvænge figurines =

Coordinates: 55.185°N 11.810°E

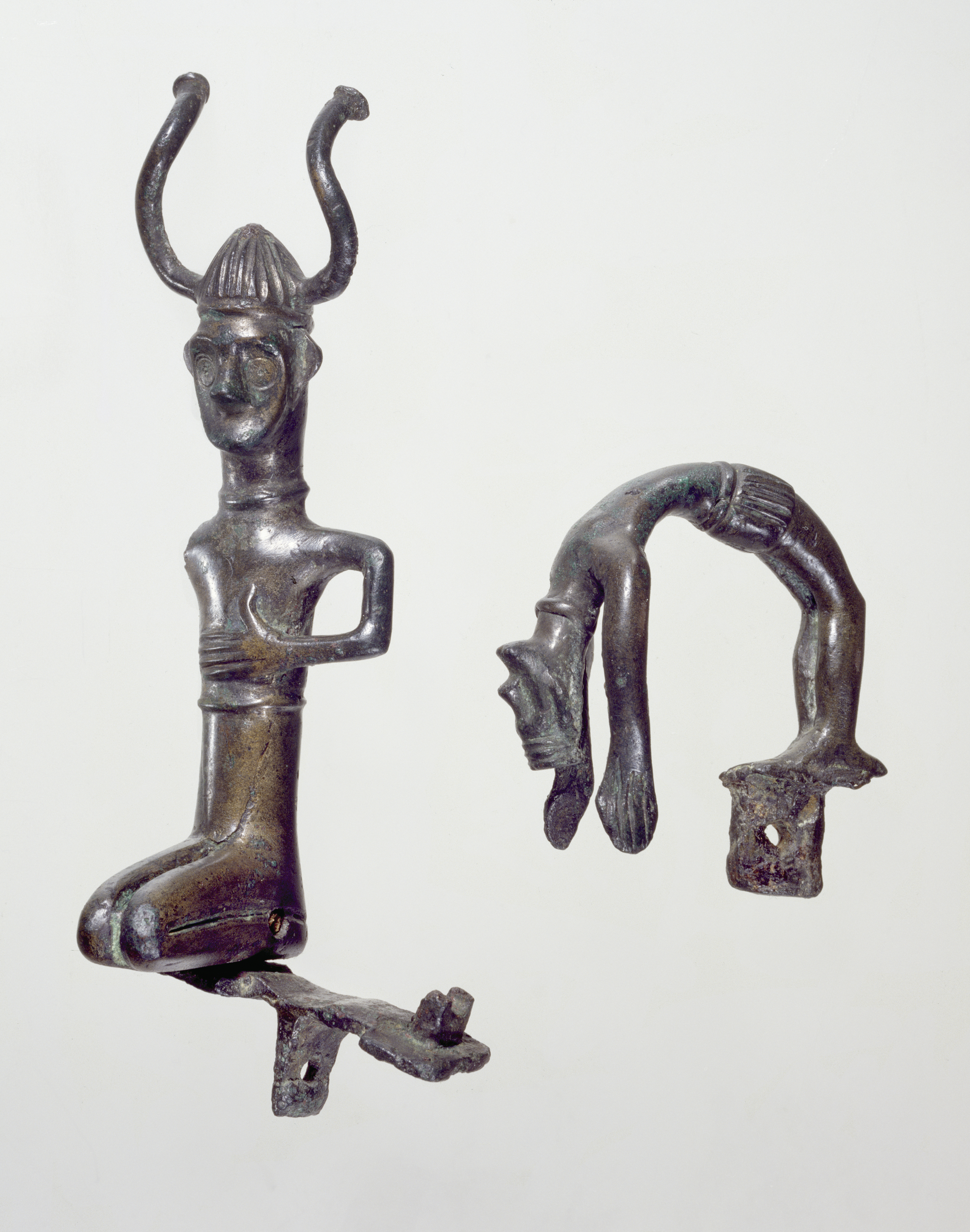
The two remaining figurines

The Grevensvænge hoard is a find of the late Nordic Bronze Age (roughly dating to between 800 BC and 500 BC), discovered in the late 18th century at Grevensvænge, Næstved Municipality, Zealand, Denmark.

The hoard consisted of six bronze figurines, two of which are now in the collections of the National Museum of Denmark. One figurine was lost during the 1807 Bombardment of Copenhagen, while the whereabouts of the remaining three are unknown.

Based on comparison with petroglyphs of the same era (e.g. Tanumshede, Sweden), it is assumed that the figurines were originally part of an ensemble arranged on a ship.

Both the twins motif and the cultic significance of the horned helmets, seems to have persisted into early Germanic culture. The kneeling warrior figures have been interpreted as the "Ashvins" type divine twins of early Indo-European religion, sons of the sky-god, known by the name of Alcis to Tacitus.

== History of the find ==
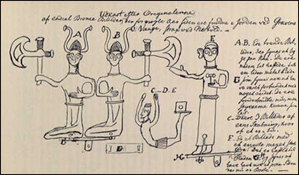
1779 drawing by Marcus Schnabel

After their discovery, the figurines were kept with the pastor at Herlufmagle, Marcus Schnabel. In a letter dated January 2, 1779, he wrote of them having been found in the ground "a few years ago", and included a drawing and description of the six figurines:

- Two kneeling figurines of warriors with horned helmets, affixed side-by-side to a small bronze bar. The figurines mirror each other, with one hand across their chest and a large axe in the other.
- Three leaping acrobats (only one depicted in Schnabel's drawing, but apparently similar in appearance).
- A standing woman, gesturing with one hand and holding an object with the other, affixed to one end of a small bronze bar. A seventh, mirrored figurine is assumed to have once been affixed to the other end, though no such figurine was ever found.

It appears that historian P.F. Suhms acquired the figurines around 1780, and that after his death, they were separated and sold at auction in 1800. The right axeman was lost during the Bombardment of Copenhagen in 1807, while the left was gifted to what would later become the National Museum of Denmark in 1823, though by then, it had lost its right arm and axe. In 1839, the museum also bought one of the acrobat figurines. The whereabouts of the standing woman and remaining two acrobats are not known.

== See also ==
- Veksø helmets, Bronze Age helmets from Denmark, with similar horned design
- Religion of Bronze Age Europe
- Solar barge
- Trundholm sun chariot
