= Lithuanian mythology =

Lithuanian mythology (Lithuanian: Lietuvių mitologija) is the mythology of Lithuanian polytheism, the religion of pre-Christian Lithuanians. Like other Indo-Europeans, ancient Lithuanians maintained a polytheistic mythology and religious structure. In pre-Christian Lithuania, mythology was a part of polytheistic religion; after Christianisation, mythology survived mostly in folklore, customs, and festive rituals. Lithuanian mythology is very close to the mythology of other Baltic nations, such as Prussians and Latvians, and is considered a part of Baltic mythology.

== Sources and evidence ==
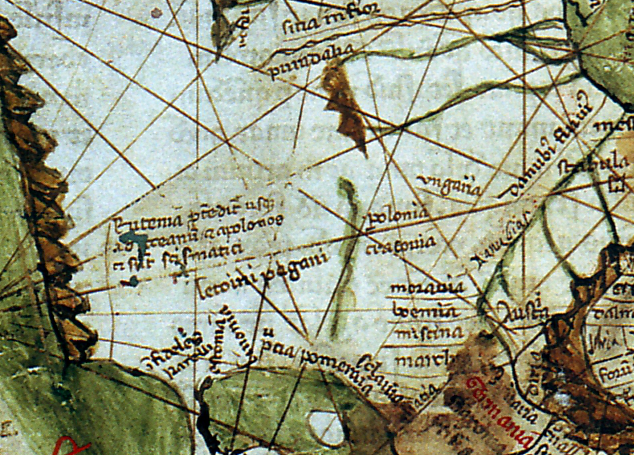
Lithuania in the Mappa mundi of Pietro Vesconte, 1321. The inscription reads: Letvini pagani - pagan Lithuanians.

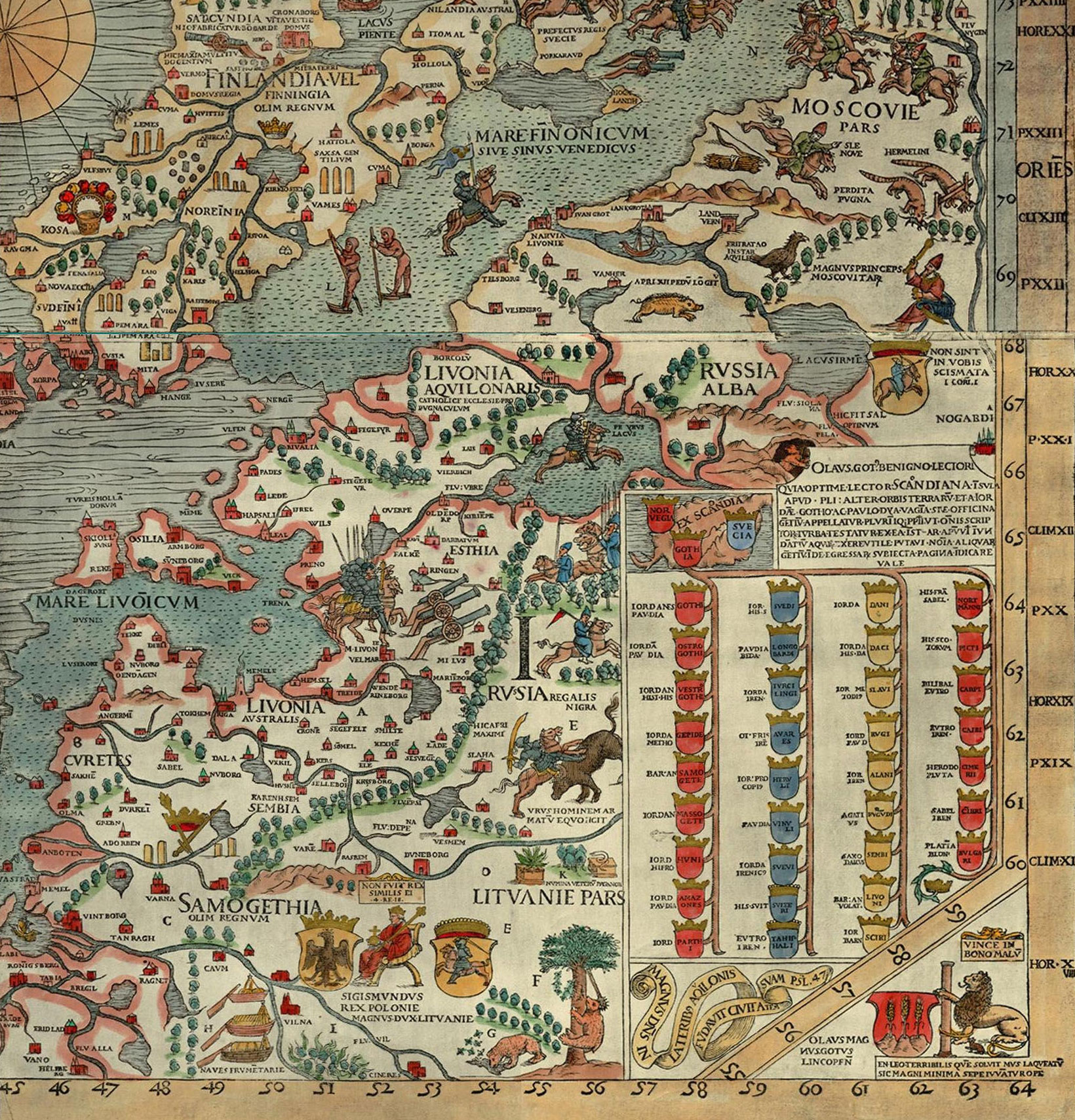
Žaltys and the Holy Fire are depicted in Olaus Magnus' Carta Marina, above the inscription LITVANIE PARS

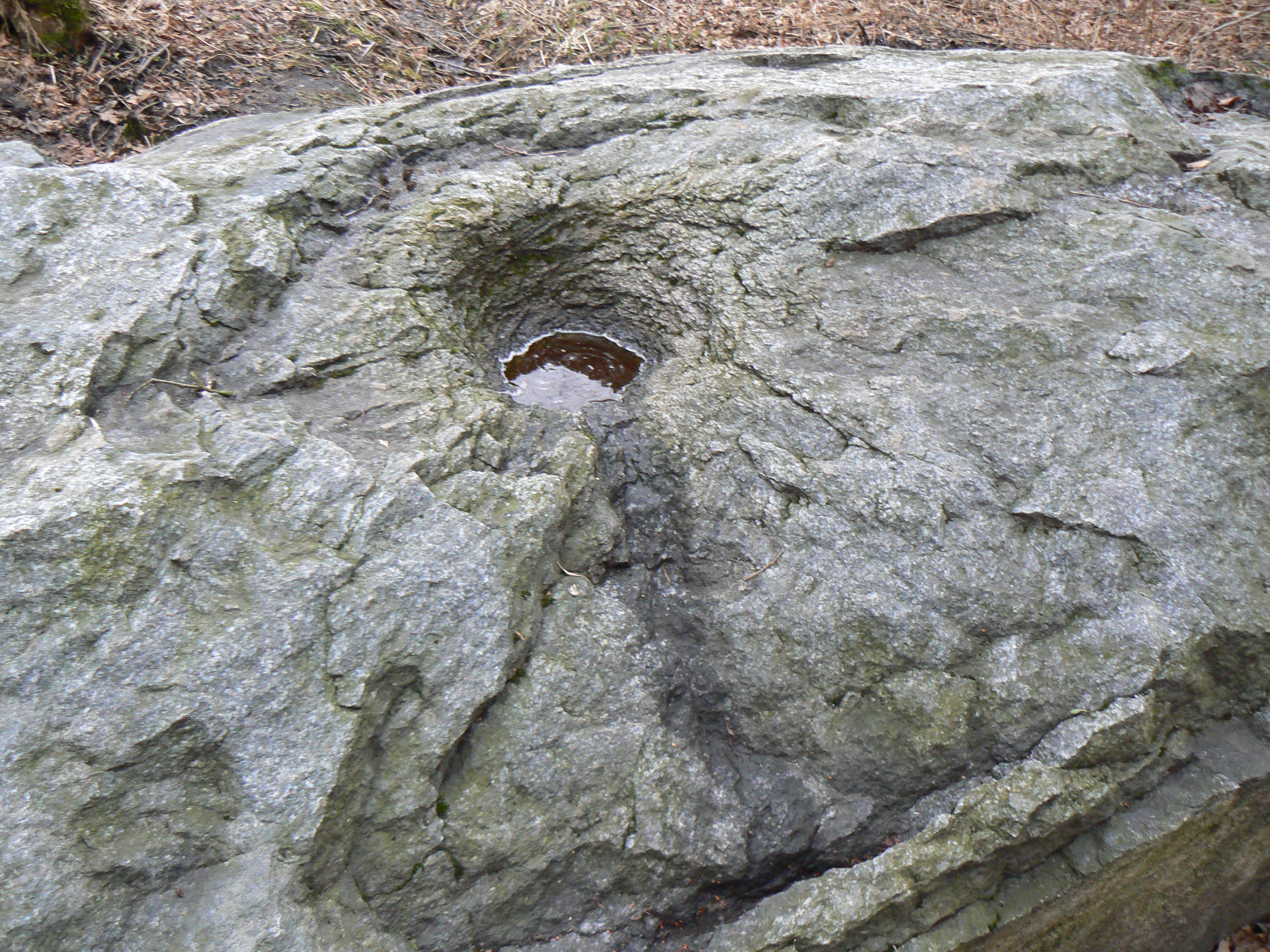
An old sacrificial stone in Lithuania

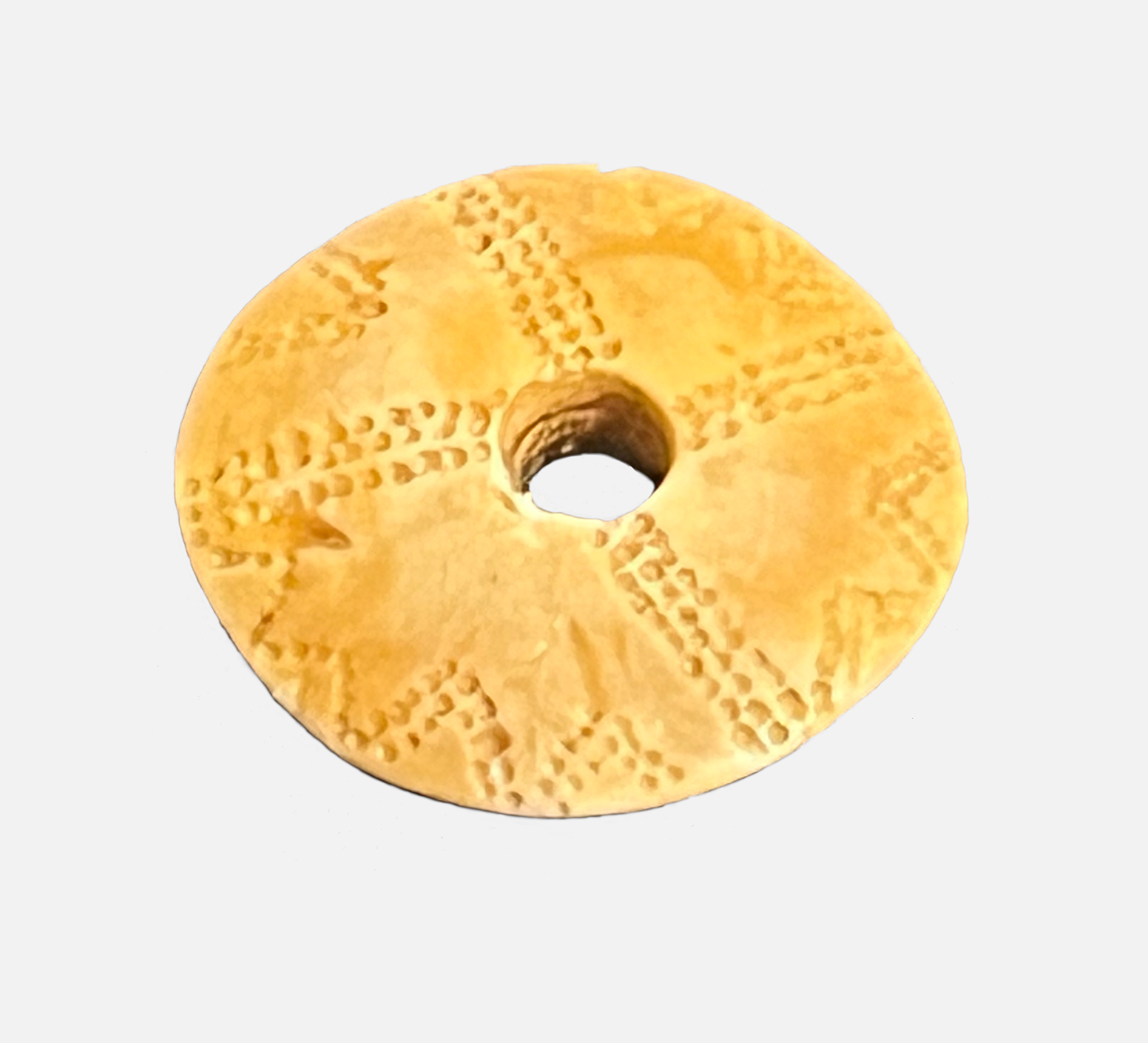
Baltic amber disk, 3096-2885 BC

Early Lithuanian religion and customs were based on oral tradition. Therefore, the first records about Lithuanian mythology and beliefs were made by travellers, Christian missionaries, chronicle writers, and historians. Original Lithuanian oral tradition partially survived in national ritual and festive songs and legends, which started to be written down in the 18th century. Contemporary scholarship posits that few reliable sources on Lithuanian paganism have survived. These sources are often formulaic, limited in informational depth, and subject to standardized interpretations as guessed by Marius Ščavinskas who also says that the old (pagan) customs (about which we know practically nothing).

The oldest known texts about Baltic religion were written by Herodotus (in which he describes the Neuri in his Histories) and Tacitus (who mentions in Germania that Aestii wear boar figures and worship a mother of gods). The Neuri were mentioned by Roman geographer Pomponius Mela. In the 9th century, there is one attestation about Prussian (Aestii) funeral traditions by Wulfstan. In the 11th century, Adam of Bremen mentioned Prussians living in Sambia and their holy groves. 12th century Muslim geographer al-Idrisi mentioned Balts in The Book of Roger as worshipers of Holy Fire and their flourishing city Madsun (Mdsūhn, Mrsunh, Marsūna).

The first recorded Baltic myth, The Tale of Sovij, was detected as the complementary insert in the copy of Chronographia (Χρονογραφία) of Greek chronicler John Malalas, from Antioch, rewritten in 1262 in Lithuania. It is the first recorded Baltic myth and also the first placed among myths of other nations – Greek, Roman and others. The Tale of Sovij describes the establishing of cremation custom which was common among Lithuanians and other Baltic nations. The names of the Baltic gods lt:Andajus, Perkūnas, lt:Žvorūna, and a smith-god lt:Teliavelis are mentioned.

When the Prussian Crusade and Lithuanian Crusade started, more first-hand knowledge about beliefs of Balts were recorded, but these records were mixed with propaganda about "infidels". One of the first valuable sources is the 1249 Treaty of Christburg between the pagan Prussian clans, represented by a papal legate, and the Teutonic Knights. The treaty mentions the worship of Kurkas (Curche), the god of harvest and grain, as well as pagan priests (Tulissones vel Ligaschones) who performed certain rituals at funerals.

Chronicon terrae Prussiae is a major source for information on the Teutonic Order's battles with Old Prussians and Lithuanians. It mentions Prussian religion and the center of Baltic religion – Romuva, where lived Kriwe-Kriwajto, a powerful priest who was held in high regard by the Prussians, Lithuanians, and the Balts of Livonia. The Livonian Rhymed Chronicle, which covers the period 1180 – 1343, contains records about the ethical codex of the Lithuanians and other Baltic peoples. Descriptiones terrarum was written by an anonymous author in the middle of 13th century. The author was a guest at the coronation of Lithuanian king Mindaugas. The author mentions that Lithuanians, Yotvingians, and Nalsenians embraced Christianity quite easily, since their childhood nuns were usually Christian, but Christianity in Samogitia was introduced only with a sword.

Die Littauischen Wegeberichte (The descriptions of Lithuanian routes) is a compilation of 100 routes into the western Grand Duchy of Lithuania prepared by the Teutonic Knights and their spies in 1384–1402. It contains descriptions of Lithuanian holy groves and sacrificial places (alkas). The Hypatian Codex, written in 1425, mentions Lithuanian gods and customs. Simon Grunau was the author of Preussische Chronik, written sometime between 1517 and 1529. It became the main source for research of Prussian mythology and one of the main sources of Lithuanian mythology researchers and reconstructors. It was the first source which described the flag of Vaidevutis. The book however also contained many questionable ideas.

Pierre d'Ailly, French theologian and cardinal of the Roman Catholic Church mentions the Sun (Saulė) as one of the most important Lithuanian gods, which rejuvenates the world as its spirit. Like Romans, Lithuanians consecrate the Sunday entirely for the Sun. Although they worship the Sun, they have no temples. The astronomy of Lithuanians is, however, based on the lunar calendar.

Enea Silvio Bartolomeo Piccolomini, who later became Pope Pius II, in the section de Europa of his book Historia rerum ubique gestarum, cites Jerome of Prague, who attested Lithuanians worshiping the Sun and the iron hammer which was used to free it from the tower in which it was being held captive. He also mentions Christian missionaries felling the holy groves and sacred oaks, which Lithuanians believed to be the homes of their gods. Jan Łasicki created De diis Samagitarum caeterorumque Sarmatarum et falsorum Christianorum (Concerning the gods of Samagitians, and other Sarmatians and false Christians), written c. 1582 and published in 1615. Although it has some important facts, it also contains many inaccuracies, as he did not know Lithuanian and relied for his sources upon the first-hand accounts of others. The list of Lithuanian gods, provided by Jan Łasicki, is still considered as important and of interest for Lithuanian mythology. Later researchers Teodor Narbutt, Simonas Daukantas, and Jonas Basanavičius relied on his work.

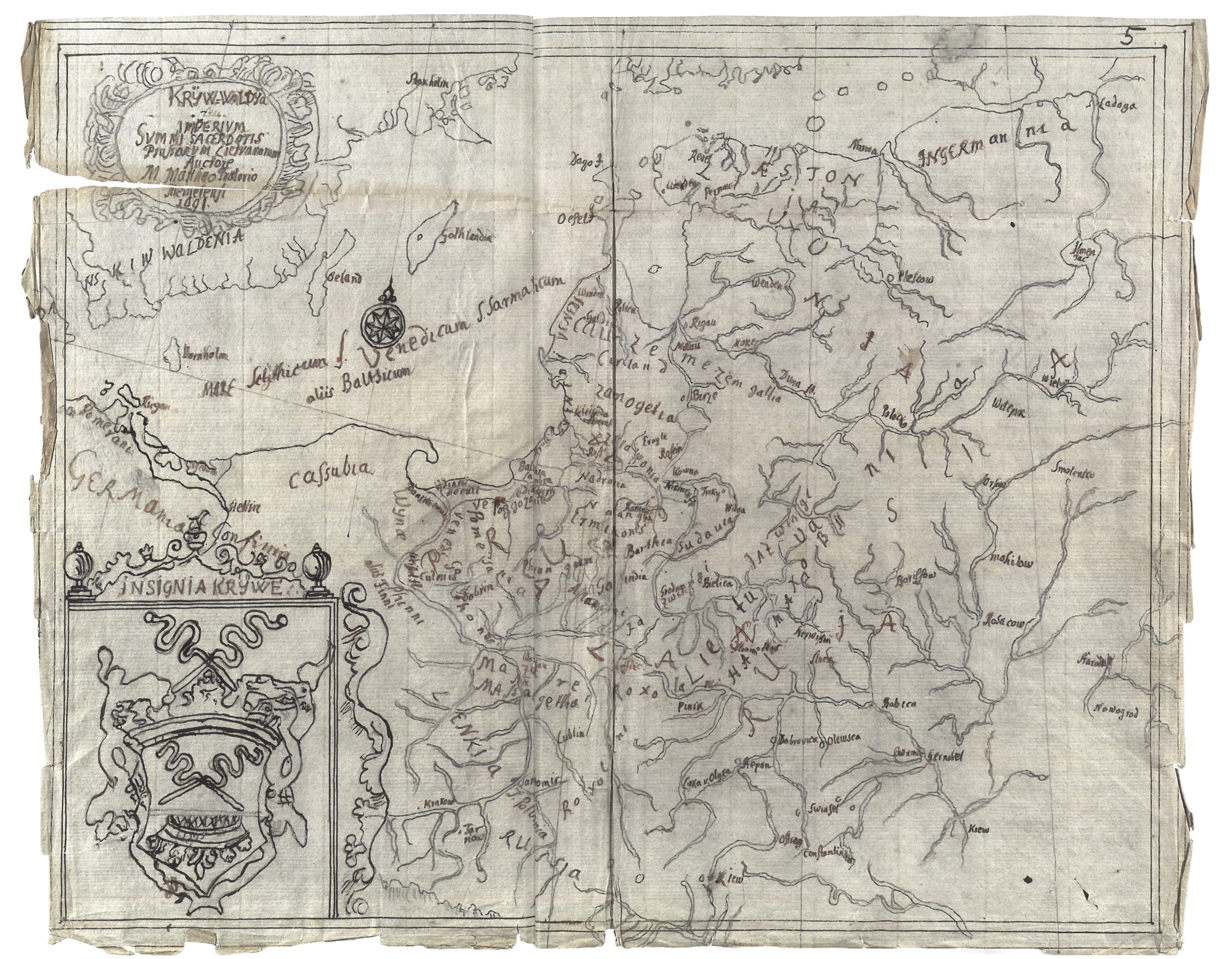
Map of the influence of highest priest of Prussians and Lithuanians by Matthäus Prätorius, 1691

Matthäus Prätorius, in his two-volume Deliciae Prussicae oder Preussische Schaubühne, written in 1690, collected facts about Prussian and Lithuanian rituals. He idealises the culture of Prussians and considers it belonging to the culture of the Antique world. The Sudovian Book is an anonymous work about the customs, religion, and daily life of the Prussians from Sambia (Semba). The manuscript was written in German in the 16th century. The book includes a list of Prussian gods, sorted in a generally descending order from sky to earth to underworld, and was an important source for reconstructing Baltic and Lithuanian mythology.

The Pomesanian statute book of 1340 is the earliest attested document of the customary law of the Balts, as well as the works of Dietrich of Nieheim (Cronica) and Sebastian Münster (Cosmographia).

Lithuanian song collections were recorded by Liudvikas Rėza, Antanas Juška and many others in 19th century and later, among them mythological and ritual songs. For example, the song recorded by L. Rėza - Mėnuo saulužę vedė (How the Moon married the Sun) reflects beliefs that L. Rėza stated were still alive at the moment of recording. Folklore collections by, among others, Mečislovas Davainis-Silvestraitis (collected about 700 Samogitian fairy-tales and tales (sakmės)) and Jonas Basanavičius (collected hundreds of songs, tales, melodies and riddles).

== Scholarship ==
Surviving information about Baltic mythology in general is fragmented. As with most ancient Indo-European cultures (e.g. Greece and India), the original primary mode of transmission of seminal information such as myths, stories, and customs was oral, the then-unnecessary custom of writing being introduced later during the period of the text-based culture of Christianity. Most of the early written accounts are very brief and made by foreigners, usually Christians, who disapproved of pagan traditions. Some academics regard some texts as inaccurate misunderstandings or even fabrications. In addition, many sources list many different names and different spellings, thus sometimes it is not clear if they are referring to the same thing.

Lithuania became Christianized between the end of the 14th century and the beginning of the 15th century, but Lithuanian polytheism survived for another two centuries, gradually losing influence and coherence as a religion. The last conceptions of the old religion survived approximately until the beginning of the 19th century. The relics of the old polytheistic religion were already interwoven with songs, tales, and other mythic stories. Gradually, Lithuanian polytheism customs and songs merged with the Christian tradition. At the beginning of the 20th century, Michał Pius Römer noted - "Lithuanian folklore culture having its sources in heathenism is in complete concord with Christianity".

In 1883, Edmund Veckenstedt published a book Die Mythen, Sagen und Legenden der Zamaiten (Litauer) (English: The myths, sagas and legends of the Samogitians (Lithuanians)).

It is not easy to reconstruct Lithuanian mythology in its entirety, not least because it did not remain static, but developed constantly, undergoing considerable change during the centuries of its survival.

J. Dlugosz tried to research myths and religion of ancient Lithuanians. He considered it close to the ancient culture of Rome. Almost all authors of Renaissance - J. Dlugosz, M. Stryjkowski, J. Lasicki, M. Prätorius, and others, relied not only on previous authors and chroniclers, but included facts and attestations of their time as well. Since Renaissance scholars were quite knowledgeable about the culture of ancient world, their interpretation of Lithuanian religion was affected by Roman or Greek cultures.

Many scholars preferred to write their own reconstructions of Lithuanian mythology, based also on historical, archaeological, and ethnographic data. The first such reconstruction was written by the Lithuanian historian Theodor Narbutt at the beginning of the 19th century.

Interest in the language and mythology of the Lithuanians grew steadily among Indo-Europeanists, who were coming to appreciate the innate linguistic and cultural conservatism of the Baltic nations and the relevance of such archaic survivals to their attempts at reconstructing the remote, Indo-European past.

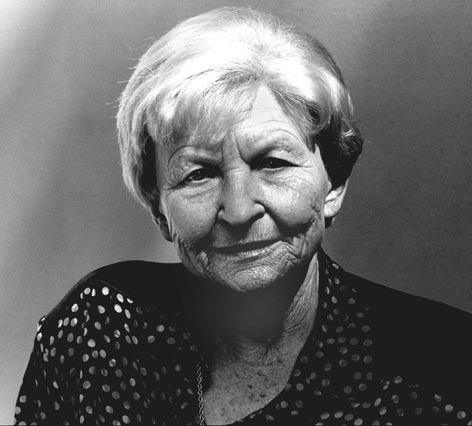
Marija Gimbutas

Italian linguist Vittore Pisani, along with his research of Baltic languages, studied Lithuanian mythology. Two well-known attempts at reconstruction have been attempted more recently by Marija Gimbutas and Algirdas Julien Greimas. According to G. Beresenevičius, it is impossible to reconstruct the Lithuanian mythology in its entirety, since only fragments survived. Marija Gimbutas explored Lithuanian and Baltic mythology using her method - archaeomythology, where archeological findings are interpreted through known mythology. V. Ivanov and V. Toporov used a material related to the Lithuanian spells to restore the Indo-European myths.

The most modern academics exploring Lithuanian mythology in the second half of the 20th century were Norbertas Vėlius and Gintaras Beresnevičius.

== Gods and mythological figures ==
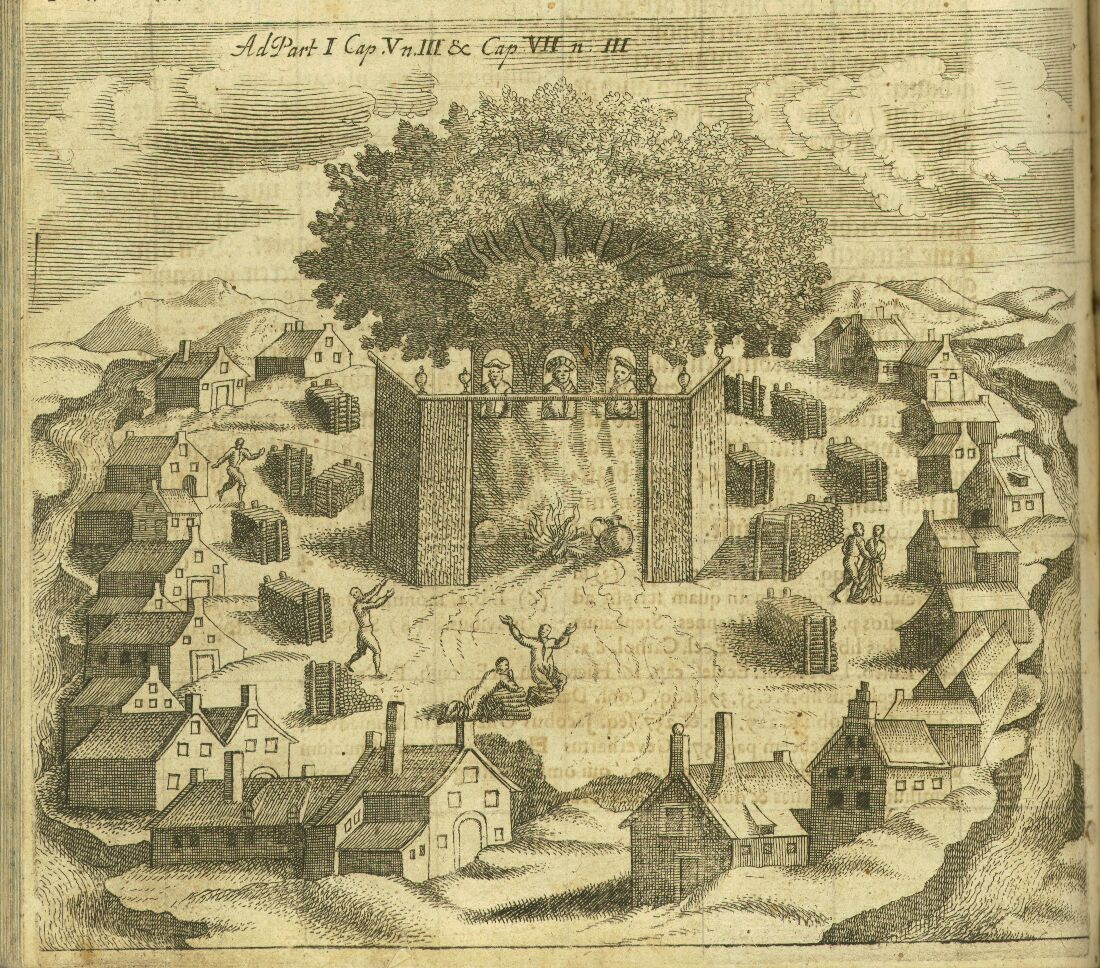
Imaginary Romuva sanctuary in Prussia. From Christoph Hartknoch's Alt- und neues Preussen (Old and New Prussia), 1684.

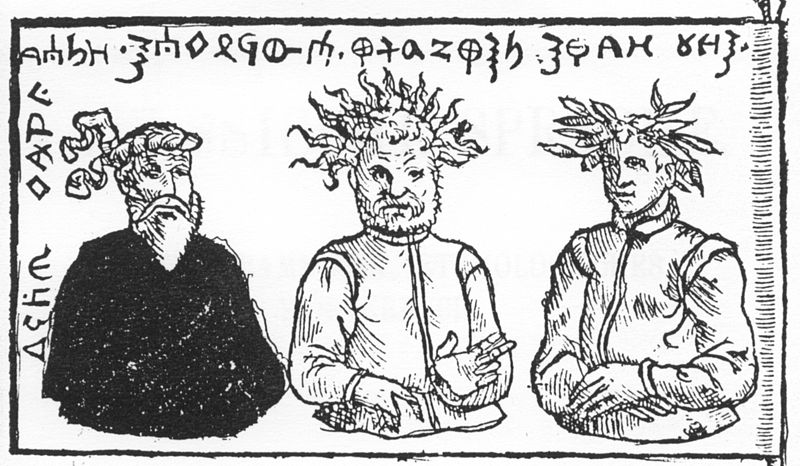
The purported flag of Vaidevutis

The pantheon of Lithuania was formed during thousands of years by merging pre-Indo-European and Indo-European traditions. Feminine gods such as Žemyna (goddess of the earth) are attributed to pre-Indo-European tradition, whereas the expressive thunder-god Perkūnas is considered to derive from Indo-European religion. The hierarchy of the gods depended also on social strata of ancient Lithuanian society.

Dievas, also called Dievas senelis ('old man God'), Dangaus Dievas ('the God of heaven') - the supreme sky god. It is descended from Proto-Indo-European *deiwos, "celestial" or "shining", from the same root as *Dyēus, the reconstructed chief god of the Proto-Indo-European pantheon. It relates to ancient Greek Zeus (Ζεύς or Δίας), Latin Dius Fidius, Luvian Tiwat, German Tiwaz. The name Dievas is being used in Christianity as the name of God.

Andajus (Andajas, Andojas) is mentioned in chronicles as the most powerful and highest god of Lithuanians. Lithuanians cried its name in a battle. It might just be an epithet of the supreme god - Dievas.

Perkūnas, god of thunder, also synonymically called Dundulis, Bruzgulis, Dievaitis, Grumutis etc. It closely relates to other thunder gods in many Indo-European mythologies: Vedic Parjanya, Celtic Taranis, Germanic Thor, Slavic Perun. The Finnic and Mordvin/Erza thunder god named Pur'ginepaz shows in folklore themes that resemble the imagery of Lithuanian Perkunas. Perkūnas is the assistant and executor of Dievas's will. He is also associated with the oak tree.

Dievo sūneliai (the "sons of Dievas") – Ašvieniai, pulling the carriage of Saulė (the Sun) through the sky. Like the Greek Dioscuri Castor and Pollux, it is a mytheme of the Divine twins common to the Indo-European mythology. Two well-accepted descendants of the Divine Twins, the Vedic Aśvins and the Lithuanian Ašvieniai, are linguistic cognates ultimately deriving from the Proto-Indo-European word for the horse, *h₁éḱwos. They are related to Sanskrit áśva and Avestan aspā (from Indo-Iranian *aćua), and to Old Lithuanian ašva, all sharing the meaning of "mare".

Velnias (Velas, Velinas) – chthonic god of the underworld, related to the cult of dead. The root of the word is the same as of Lithuanian: vėlė ('soul of the deceased'). After the introduction of Christianity, it was equated with evil, and Velnias became the Lithuanian name for devil. In some tales, Velnias (the devil) was the first owner of fire. God sent a swallow, which managed to steal the fire.

Žemyna (Žemė, Žemelė) (from Lithuanian: žemė 'earth') is the goddess of the earth. It relates to Thracian Zemele (mother earth), Greek Semelē (Σεμέλη). She is usually regarded as mother goddess and one of the chief Lithuanian gods. Žemyna personifies the fertile earth and nourishes all life on earth, human, plant, and animal. The goddess is said to be married to either Perkūnas (thunder god) or Praamžius (manifestation of chief heavenly god Dievas). Thus the couple formed the typical Indo-European pair of mother-earth and father-sky. It was believed that each spring, the earth needs to be impregnated by Perkūnas - the heavens rain and thunder. Perkūnas unlocks (atrakina) the Earth. It was prohibited to plow or sow before the first thunder as the earth would be barren.

Žvėrinė (Žvorūna, Žvorūnė) – is the goddess of hunting and forest animals. Medeina is the name in other sources.

Medeina – the goddess of forest and hunting. Researchers suggests that she and Žvėrinė (Žvorūnė) could have been worshipped as the same goddess.

Žemėpatis (from Lithuanian: žemė 'earth' and Lithuanian: pàts 'autonomous decision maker, ruler'; or 'Earth Spouse') – god of the land, harvest, property, and homestead. Martynas Mažvydas, in 1547, in his Catechism, urged to abandon cult of Žemėpatis.

Žvaigždikis (Žvaigždystis, Žvaigždukas, Švaistikas) – the god of the stars, powerful god of light, who provided light for the crops, grass, and the animals. It was also known as Svaikstikas (Suaxtix, Swayxtix, Schwayxtix, Schwaytestix) by Yotvingians.

Gabija (also known as Gabieta, Gabeta, Matergabija, Pelengabija) is the spirit or goddess of the fire. She is the protector of the family fireplace (šeimos židinys) and family. Her name is derived from Lithuanian: gaubti – to cover, to protect. Nobody was allowed to step on firewood, since it was considered a food for the fire goddess. Even today, there is a tradition of weddings in Lithuania to light a new symbolic family fireplace from the parents of the newlyweds.

Laima (from Lithuanian: lemti – 'to destine') or Laimė – is the destiny-giver goddess.

Bangpūtys (from Lithuanian: banga 'wave' and Lithuanian: pūsti 'to blow' ) – god of the sea, wind, waves and storm. Was worshipped by fishermen and seamen.

Teliavelis/Kalevelis – a smith-god or the god of roads. First mentioned in a 1262 copy of Chronographia (Χρονογραφία) of John Malalas as Teliavel. Lithuanian linguist Kazimieras Būga reconstructed a previous form – Kalvelis (from Lithuanian: kalvis 'a smith' in diminutive form). Teliavelis/Kalevelis freed Saulė (Sun) from the dark using his iron hammer. In Lithuanian fairy-tales recorded much later, there is very frequent opposition of kalvis ('smith') and velnias ('devil').

== Historiography ==
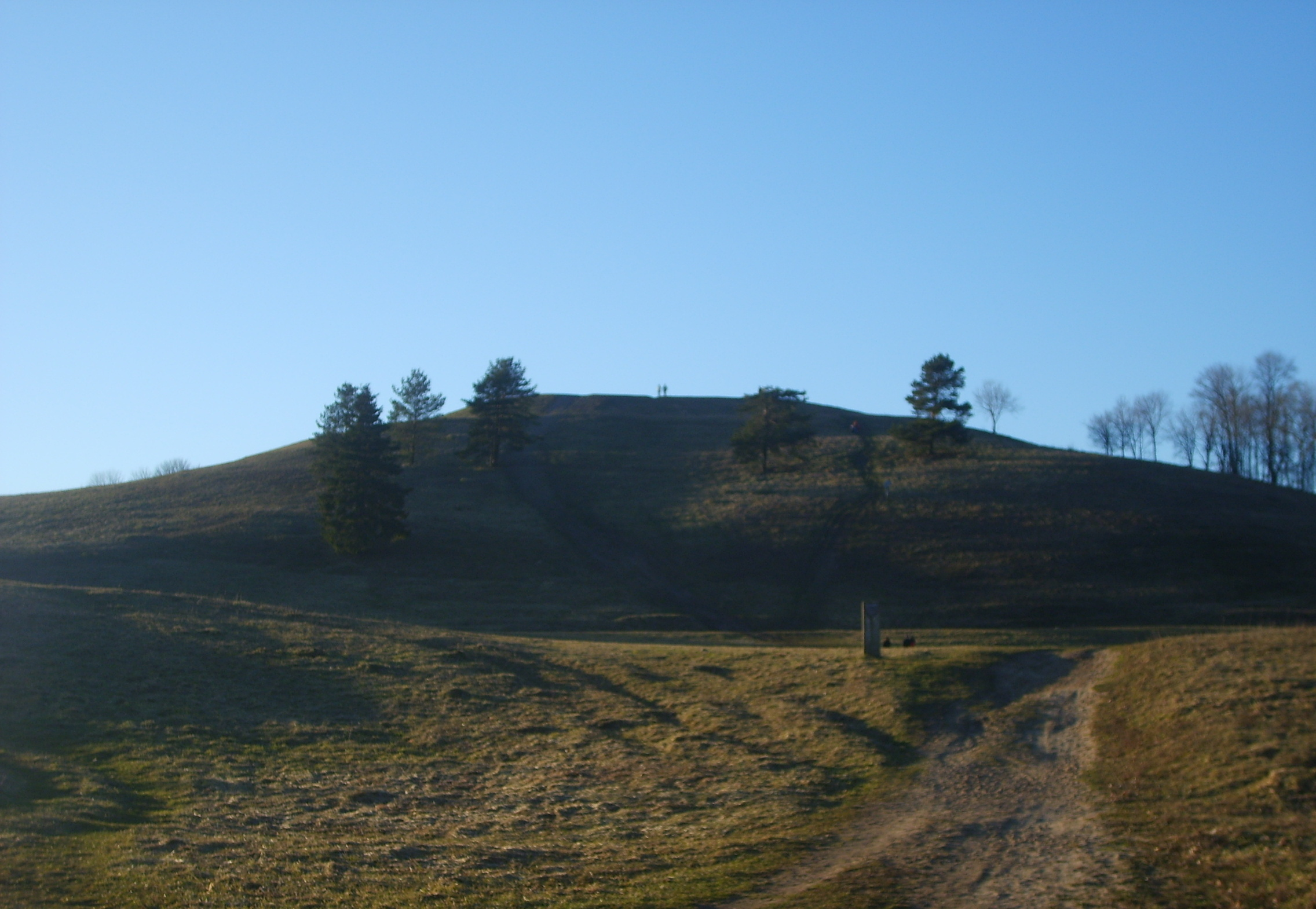
Šatrija hillfort: an administrative, defensive and religious centre in northern Samogitia up to its conversion to Christianity in 1421

Pre-Christian Lithuanian mythology is known mainly through attested fragments recorded by chroniclers and folks songs; the existence of some mythological elements, known from later sources, has been confirmed by archaeological findings. The system of polytheistic beliefs is reflected in Lithuanian tales, such as Jūratė and Kastytis, Eglė the Queen of Serpents, and the Myth of Sovij.

The next period of Lithuanian mythology started in the 15th century and lasted until approximately the middle of the 17th century. The myths of this period are mostly heroic, concerning the founding of the state of Lithuania. Perhaps two of the best known stories are those of the dream of the Grand Duke Gediminas and the founding of Vilnius, the capital of Lithuania, and of Šventaragis' Valley, which also concerns the history of Vilnius. Many stories of this kind reflect actual historical events. Already, by the 16th century, there existed a non-unified pantheon; data from different sources did not correspond one with another, and local spirits, especially those of the economic field, became mixed up with more general gods and ascended to the level of gods.

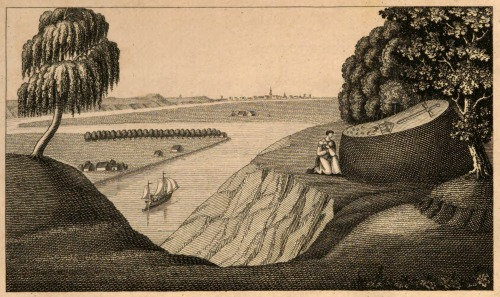
Rambynas Hill, known for its altar-stone, painted by Eduardas Gizevijus in 1835

The third period began with the growing influence of Christianity and the activity of the Jesuits, roughly since the end of the 16th century. The earlier confrontational approach to the pre-Christian Lithuanian heritage among common people was abandoned, and attempts were made to use popular beliefs in missionary activities. This also led to the inclusion of Christian elements in mythic stories.

The last period of Lithuanian mythology began in the 19th century, when the importance of the old cultural heritage was admitted, not only by the upper classes, but by the nation more widely. The mythical stories of this period are mostly reflections of the earlier myths, considered not as being true, but as the encoded experiences of the past.

== Elements and nature ==
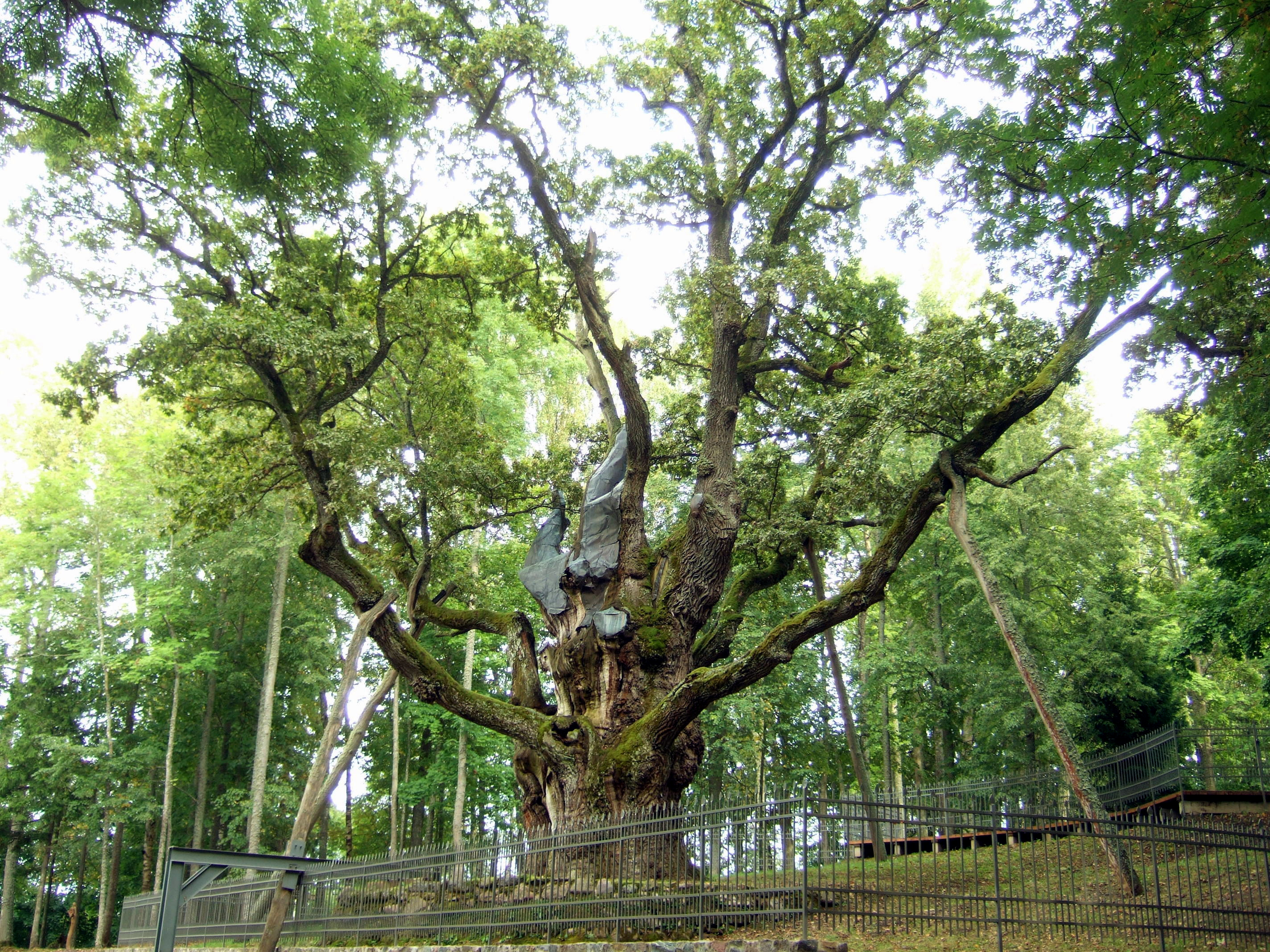
Worshiping of oaks was related to the cult of Lithuanian thunder god Perkūnas

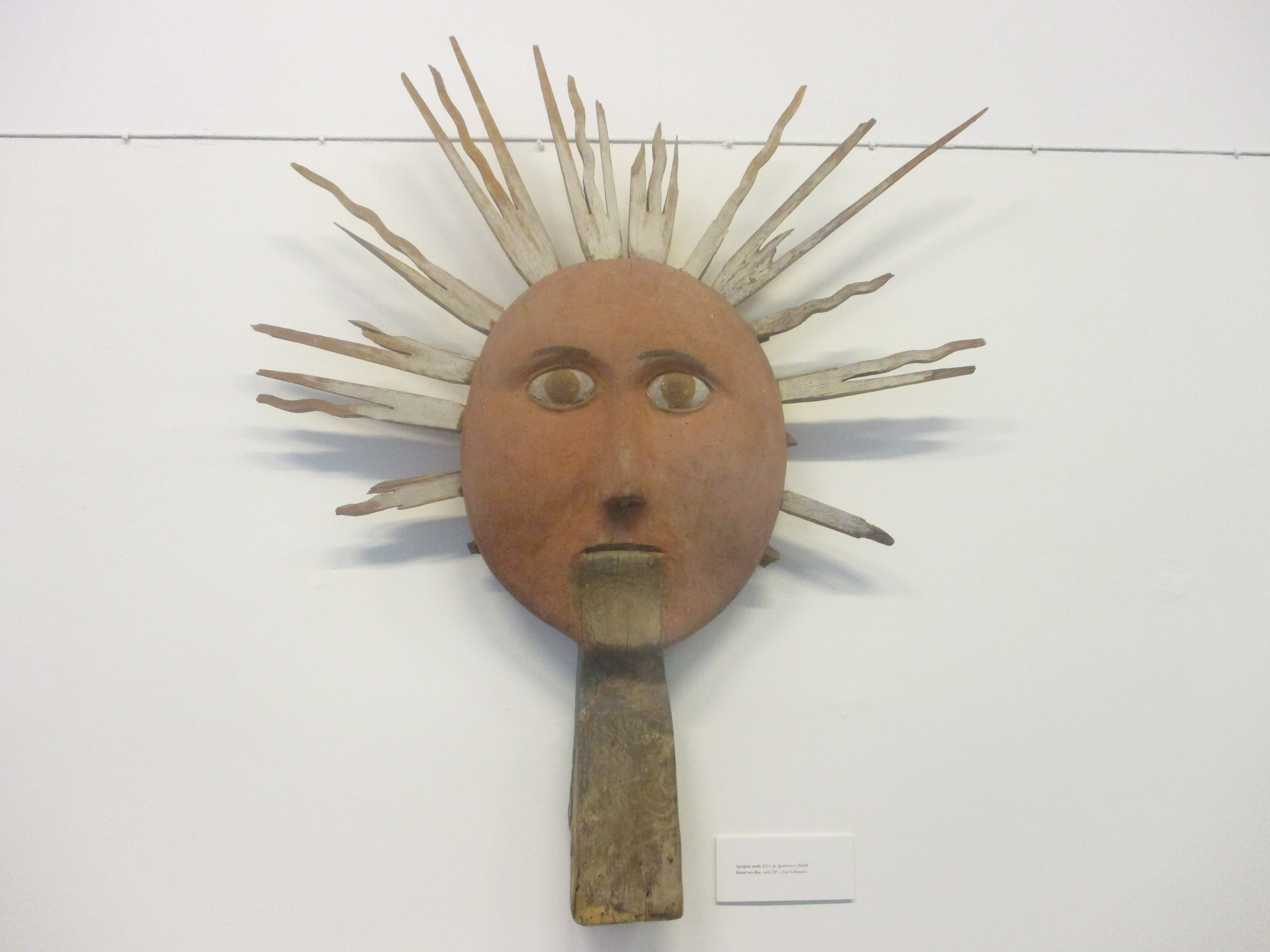
Idol of the Saulė used for peasant rituals in early 20th century from Palūšė, Ignalina District

Stories, songs, and legends of this kind describe laws of nature and such natural processes as the change of seasons of the year, their connections with each other and with the existence of human beings. Nature is often described in terms of the human family; in one central example (found in many songs and stories), the sun is called the mother, the moon the father, and stars the sisters of human beings. Lithuanian mythology is rich in gods and minor gods of water, sky and earth. Holy groves were worshipped, especially beautiful and distinctive places – alka were selected for sacrifices for gods.

=== Fire ===
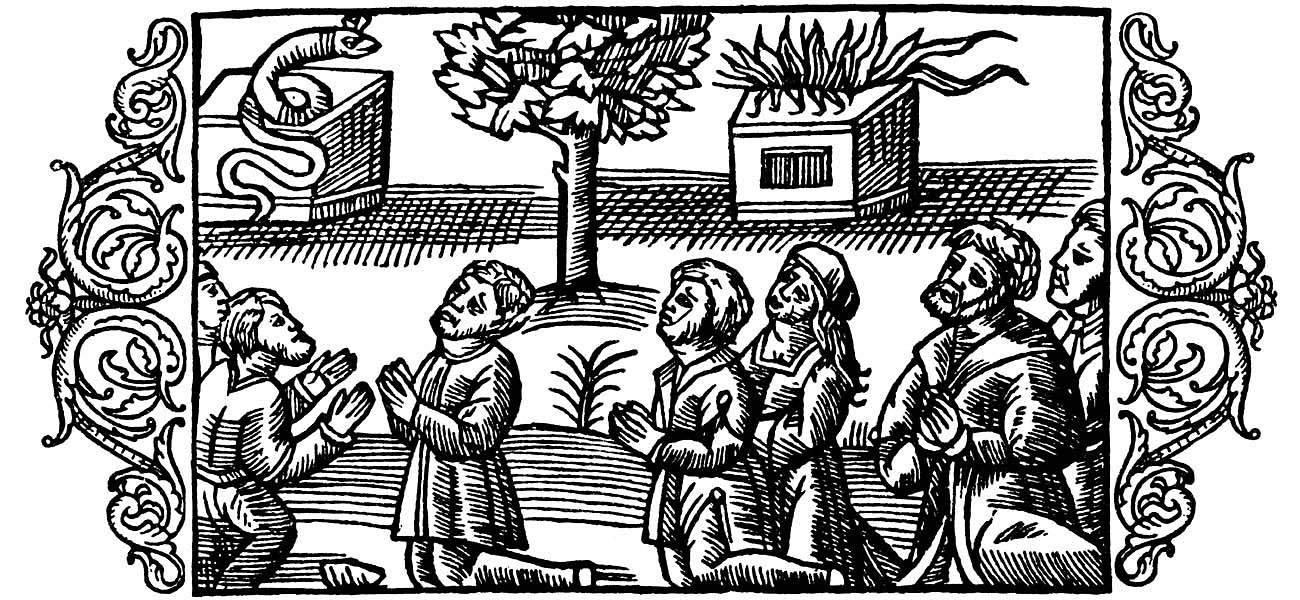
Lithuanians worshipping a grass snake, oak and holy fire. From Olaus Magnus' Historia de Gentibus Septentrionalibus (History of the Northern People), book 3, 1555.

Fire is very often mentioned by chroniclers, when they were describing Lithuanian rituals. Algridas, Grand Duke of Lithuania, was even addressed as a "fire worshiper King of Lithuania" (τῷ πυρσολάτρῃ ῥηγὶ τῶν Λιτβῶν) in the documents of a patriarch Nilus of Constantinople.

=== Water ===
Water was considered a primary element - legends describing the creation of the world, usually state that "at first there was nothing but water". Springs were worshiped - they were considered holy. The river was seen as separating the areas of life and death. If the settlement was placed at the river, then the deceased were buried in another side of the river. Water sources were highly respected and it was tradition to keep any water - spring, well, river, lake clean. Cleanliness was associated with holiness.

=== Sacred groves ===
Sacred groves were considered holy, not in themselves, but as homes of the gods. Jerome of Prague was an ardent missionary in Lithuania, zealous in supervising the felling of sacred groves and the desecration of other pagan holy places. Lithuanian women reached Vytautas the Great with plaints that they are losing their places of Dievas, the places where they prayed to the supreme god – Dievas to withhold the Sun or rain. Now, when the holy groves are destroyed, they do not know where to search for Dievas since it lost its home. Jerome of Prague was finally sent out of the country.

=== Celestial bodies ===
Celestial bodies – planets were seen as a family. Mėnulis (Moon) married Saulė (Sun) and they had seven daughters: Aušrinė (Morning Star – Venus), Vakarinė (Evening Star – Venus), Indraja (Jupiter), Vaivora or son Pažarinis in some versions (Mercury), Žiezdrė (Mars), Sėlija (Saturn), and Žemė (Earth). Three daughters lived close to their mother Saulė, another three were traveling.

Grįžulo Ratai (also – Grigo Ratai, Perkūno Ratai, Vežimas) (Ursa Major) was imagined as a carriage for the Sun which was travelling through the sky, Mažieji Grįžulo Ratai (Ursa Minor) – a carriage for the daughter of Sun.

Zodiac or Astrological signs were known as liberators of the Saulė (Sun) from the tower in which it was locked by the powerful king – the legend recorded by Jerome of Prague in 14-15th century.

== Myths and legends ==
Legends (padavimai, sakmės) and myths are short stories explaining the local names, appearance of the lakes and rivers, other notable places like mounds or big stones.

- The Tale of Sovij
- The myth of god-smith Teliavelis freeing the Sun
- The cosmogonic myths of celestial bodies: Aušrinė, Saulė and Mėnulis, Grįžulo Ratai, also known as "the celestial marriage drama".
- The nine-point deer (Elnias devyniaragis) – the deer which carries the sky with planets on its antler.
- Eglė the Queen of Serpents
- Jūratė and Kastytis
- The Tale of priestess (vaidilutė) Birutė and Grand Duke Kęstutis.
- Iron Wolf – the legend about the founding of Vilnius.
- Palemonids – the legend of origin of Lithuanians.

== Legacy ==
Lithuanian mythology serves as inspiration for Lithuanian artists. Many interpretations of Eglė – the Queen of Serpents were made in poetry and visual art. In modern Lithuanian music, polytheistic rituals and sutartinės songs were source of inspiration for Bronius Kutavičius. Old Lithuanian names, related to nature and mythology, are often given to children. Many pagan traditions slightly transformed were adopted by the Christian religion in Lithuania. Oaks are still considered a special tree, and grass snakes are treated with care. Old songs and pagan culture serve as inspiration for rock and pop musicians. There are also movements seeking to revive the Lithuanian pre-Christian religion.

Legacy of the Lithuanian mythology

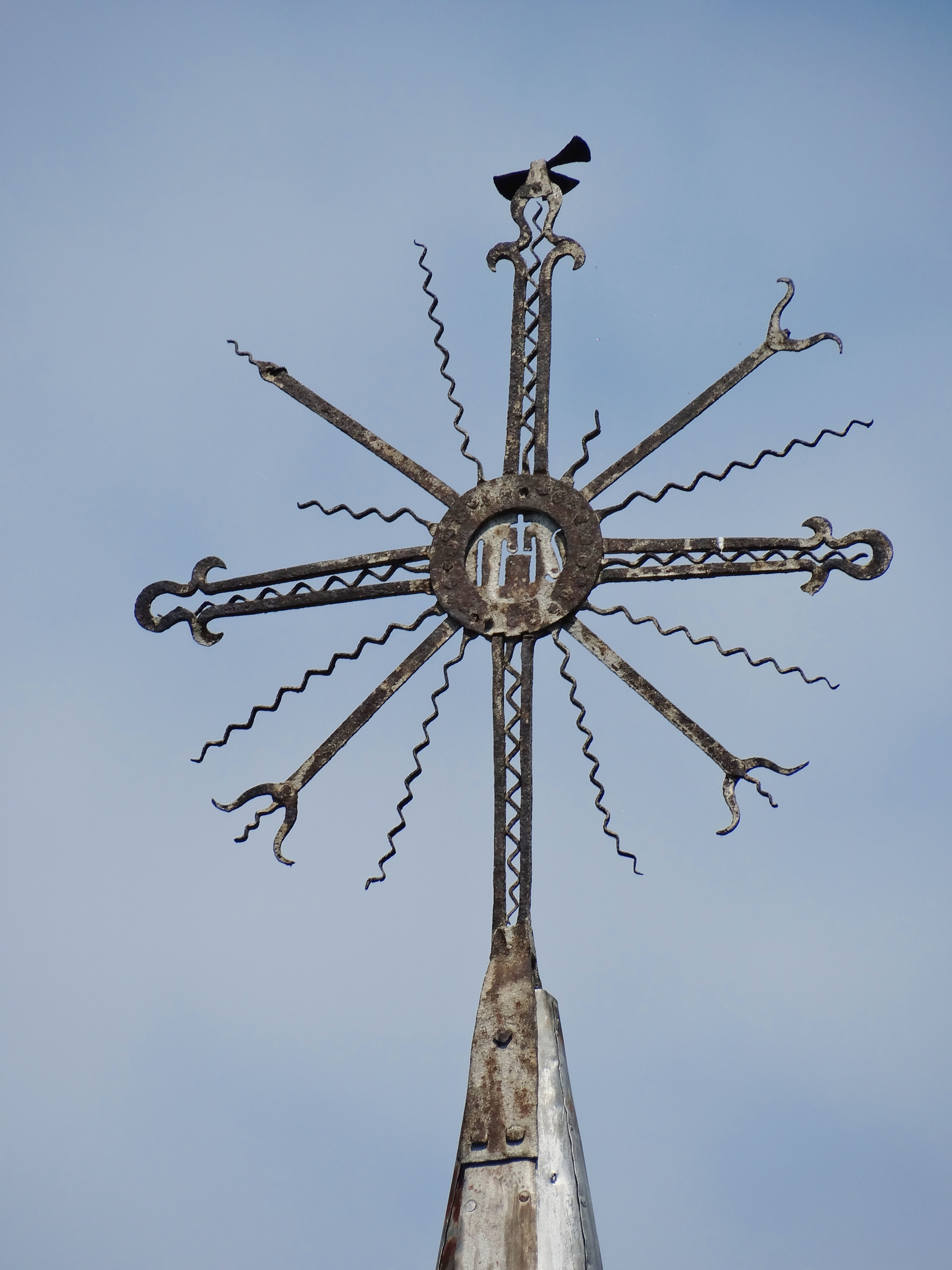
Lithuanian type of cross - saulutė (little sun) containing ancient, pre-Christian motifs.

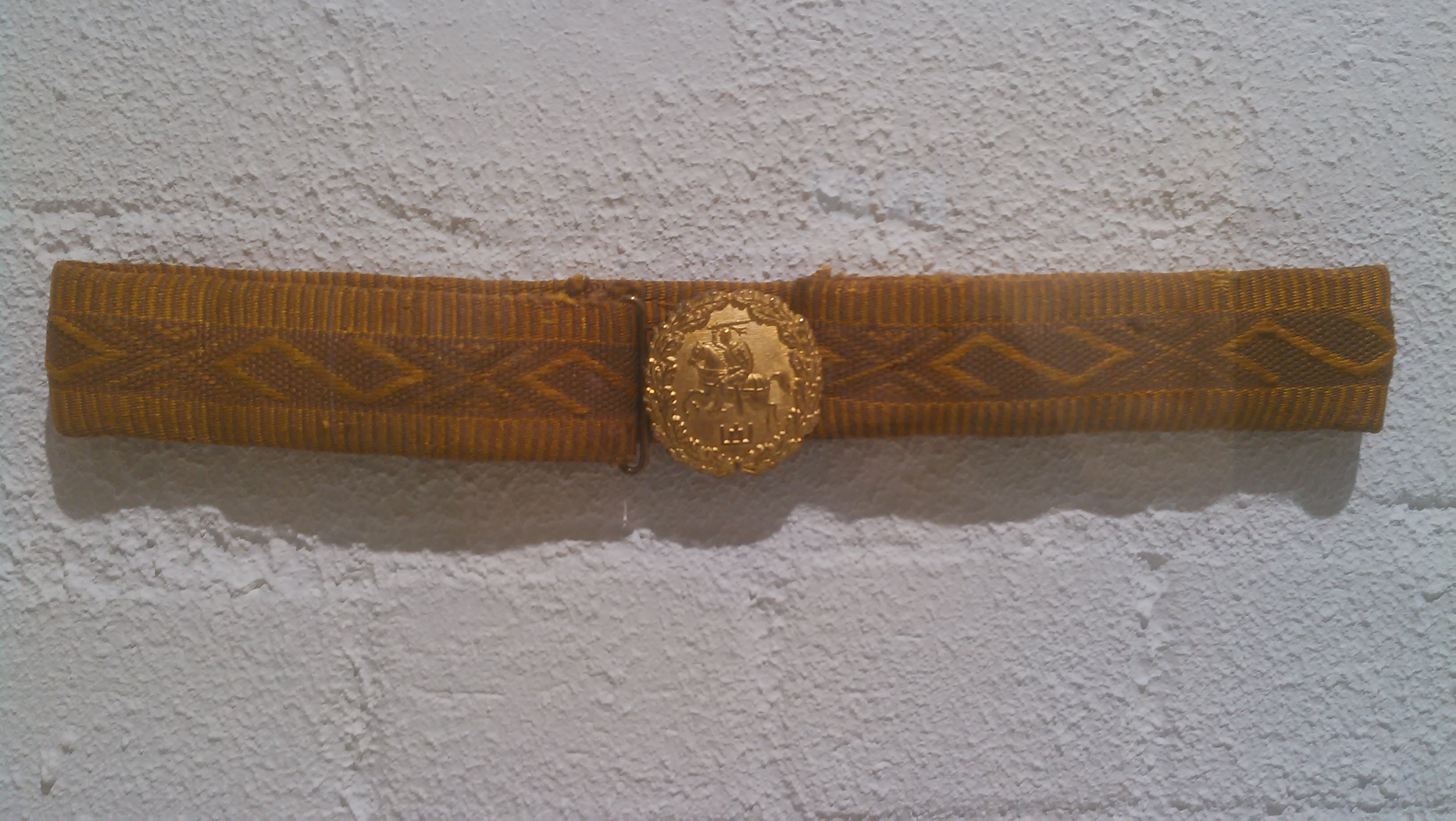
Parade belt of an officer of the Lithuanian Army, decorated with Žaltys ornaments.

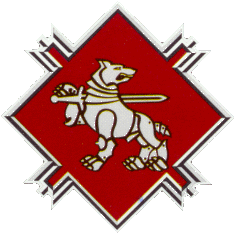
Iron Wolf is used as a mascot by the Lithuanian military (the Motorised Infantry Brigade Iron Wolf)

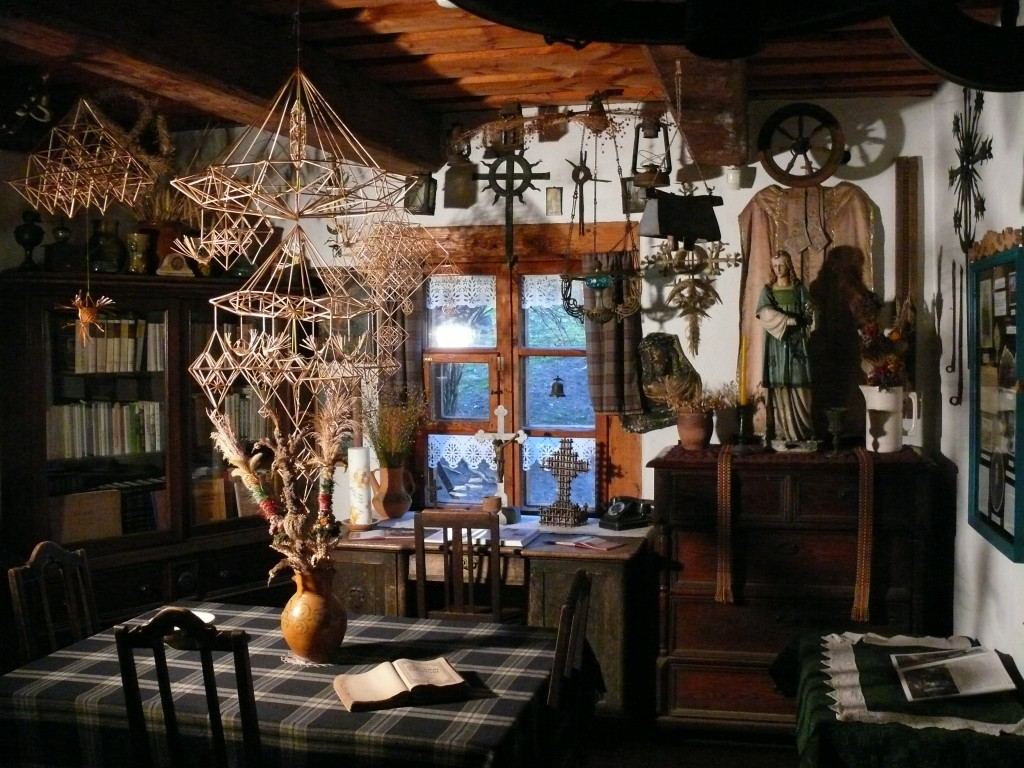
Sodas (Garden) - symbolic representation of the world and harmony.

== See also ==
- Proto-Indo-European mythology
- Indo-European cosmogony
- Alka (Baltic religion)
- Baltic mythology
- Prussian mythology
- Latvian mythology
- Romuva (religion)
- Lizdeika
- Celestial wedding in Baltic folklore

== Bibliography ==
- Parpola, Asko (2015). The Roots of Hinduism: The Early Aryans and the Indus Civilization. Oxford University Press. p. 109. ISBN 9780190226923.
- West, Morris L. (2007). Indo-European Poetry and Myth. Oxford University Press. ISBN 978-0199280759.
- Puhvel, Jaan (2001). Lyginamoji mitologija (in Lithuanian). Vilnius: Lietuvių literatūros ir tautosakos institutas. ISBN 9986-513-98-7.
- Dundulienė, Pranė (2018). Pagonybė Lietuvoje. Moteriškosios dievybės (in Lithuanian) (3 ed.). Vilnius: Mokslo ir enciklopedijų leidybos centras. ISBN 978-5-420-01638-1.
- Lemeškin, Ilja (2009). Sovijaus sakmė ir 1262 metų chronografas (Myth of Sovius and the Chronograph of 1262) (in Lithuanian). Vilnius: Lietuvos literatūros ir tautosakos institutas. ISBN 978-609-425-008-8.
- Murray, Alan V., ed. (5 December 2016). The Clash of Cultures on the Medieval Baltic Frontier. Routledge. ISBN 978-0754664833.
