= Milda (mythology) =

Goddess in Lithuanian mythology

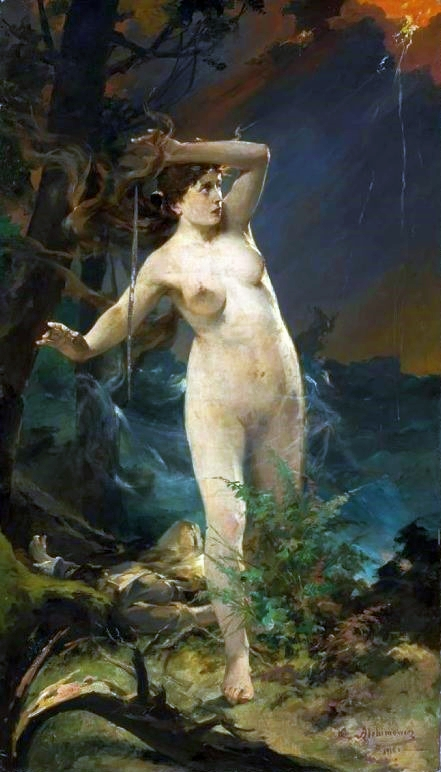
Goddess Milda by Kazimierz Alchimowicz (1910) in private collection, Vilnius

Milda, in the Lithuanian mythology, is the goddess of love. However, her authenticity is debated by scholars. Despite the uncertainty, Milda became a popular female given name in Lithuania. Neo-pagan societies and communities, including Romuva, organize various events in honor of goddess Milda in May. The Milda Mons, a mountain on Venus, is named after her.

== Narbutt's information ==
Milda was first mentioned by Teodor Narbutt in his 1835 work on the history of Lithuania. According to Narbutt, Milda was also known as Aleksota. Her temples stood in Aleksotas, Kaunas and in Antakalnis, Vilnius, where the Church of St. Peter and St. Paul now stands. The month of April was dedicated to Milda. In a December 1835 letter to Narbutt, Szymon Ławrynowicz (a teacher from Kaunas) described two figurines found at the House of Perkūnas at the end of the 18th or beginning of the 19th centuries. Narbutt identified the figurines as those of Perkūnas, the god of thunder, and Milda. Another bronze figurine was found at Vilnius Castle Complex and acquired by Adam Honory Kirkor and Władysław Syrokomla who with the help from Narbutt identified it as that of Milda. This figurine was later held at the Museum of Antiquities in Vilnius.

== Scholastic analysis ==
However, other authors, including Aleksander Brückner, Norbertas Vėlius, Gintaras Beresnevičius, expressed serious doubts whether such goddess actually existed in the Lithuanian mythology due to lack of evidence.

According to Norbertas Vėlius, Narbutt invented Milda borrowing the idea of a beautiful Roman nymph Alexothe from the writings of Dominik Szybiński. As one of Kaunas' suburbs is Aleksotas, it was only natural that Milda's temple stood there. There is no evidence, either in written documents, archaeological research, or folklore, to support Narbutt's claims. In the same vein, Latvian ethnographer Pēteris Šmits argues that Milda is a fabrication by Narbutt, since there are no traces of her as a deity either in the languages, the historical chronicles, or in Baltic folk tradition.

== Cultural legacy ==
Narbutt's information was later repeated and popularized by many other writers and historians, including Dionizas Poška, Jonas Totoraitis, Pranė Dundulienė. Milda owes her popularity to Józef Ignacy Kraszewski. In 1840, he wrote Anafielas, a three-part epic poem in Polish. The first part, Witolorauda, mentioned Milda and her festival in early May. The poem was translated into Lithuanian and published several times popularizing the goddess. Its Polish publication in 1846 was illustrated with 50 woodcuts by Wincenty Smokowski. His image of Milda continues to influence Milda's representations. In 1918, Petras Vaičiūnas wrote a poetic play dedicated to Milda.
