= Žaltys =

Lithuanian mythological serpent

- Wooden statue of a par of crowned Žaltys in Kintai, Klaipėda County

Creature information
- Grouping: House spirit

Origin
- Country: Lithuania

A žaltys (Lithuanian pronunciation: [ʒɐlʲˈtʲǐːs], literally: grass snake) is a household spirit in Lithuanian mythology. It is a sacred animal of the sun goddess Saulė, and was considered a guardian of the home and a symbol of fertility. People used to keep it as a pet by the stove or other special area of the house, believing that it would bring good harvest and wealth. Killing the žaltys was said to bring great misfortunes upon the household. If a žaltys was found in the field, people gave it milk attempting to befriend the creature and make it a sacred household pet.

== Legends ==
There is a story of a young women named Eglė who found a žaltys in her clothes after she bathed in a lake. He spoke to her and said he would give her back her clothes if she married him. She eventually agreed, and later the žaltys, who was King of the Grass Snakes Žilvinas, would take the form of a handsome young man to become her husband. He took her to his undersea home where she became immortal as Queen of the Grass Snakes.

== History ==
=== Origin of the Cult ===
The Animals Cult - one of the earliest human fantastical images, that emarged during the Late Paleolithic period. In that age humanities knowledge about nature and the world was scarce. Unexplainable nature phenomenals became based on religious images.

Early humans were the first to surround reptiles with fantastic imagery, as these creatures stood out from other animals due to their appearance, gleaming eyes, hypnotic gaze, lustrous sheen, longevity, and ability to live in water, underground, and on land.

The vitality of reptiles and their annual shedding of skin became symbols of constant renewal. This gave humans the impression that reptiles possessed eternal life and immortality, and shared a mysterious connection with the ever-renewing natural world. The venomous nature of snakes also made a profound impression (Although Žaltys is not venomous and not dangerous, at least in Lithuania and Latvia).

=== The Reptiles cult in Lithuania ===
Religious beliefs evolved alongside human society. The cult of the Žaltys became particularly widespread during the development of the primitive communal-tribal social order and the emergence of nagualism, a practice involving the worship of a personal totem.

Over time, forms of animal worship, specifically zoolatry and ophiolatry (snake worship) - emerged and developed; animals came to be regarded as sacred and associated with specific deities. The cult of reptiles, intertwined with other religious concepts, spread throughout Lithuania.

As agriculture and animal husbandry and, along with them, class society -rapidly developed, totemic and occupation-related cultic imagery faded away. Representations of the serpent, however, largely persisted in mythology, art, and certain superstitions.

== Development ==
In Lithuania, artifacts from the Stone Age frequently feature stylized heads, body segments, and tails of grass snakes or serpents.

These serpents were depicted as benevolent figures that protected the community from danger and bestowed blessings. For people of that era, carrying a totem was tantamount to worshipping it, as it was believed that a spirit inhabited the representation itself. In Lithuania, these serpents were often depicted using geometric patterns, such as wavy lines, herringbone motifs, and transverse or longitudinal dashes.

Realistic depictions of Žaltys became widespread with the emergence and advancement of blacksmithing. From that time on, these reptiles were portrayed in bronze and, later, in iron or iron artifacts and jewelry.

During the Metal Age, the characteristics of a new artistic style gradually emerged. Forms became more generalized and austere, losing their relief-like quality and lifelike detail.

As class-based society developed, traces of totemism, occupational cults, and animism remained particularly evident in myths, art, and rituals.

As Christianity suppressed ancient traditions, the Lithuanian folk cult took a decisive step backward - not only in art but also in daily life and customs. Although certain features persisted during this period of decline, we find varying manifestations of the associated imagery and concepts across different belief systems.

Part of the cult evolved into contemporary folk traditions and games that enrich people's lives, becoming significant customs in their own right.

The cult of the serpent continued to spread through the telling of entertaining tales and the ornamentation of crafted objects. Passed down from person to person and from object to object, it has survived to the present day, having also found its way into fiction, professional art, and choreography.

== Žaltys in folklore ==
=== Žaltys depictions in art ===
In folklore, Žaltys or serpents are often depicted headless, with gaping maws, or featuring two realistic or stylized ends - either forked or three-pronged - representing the tongue. This mode of depiction, inherited from the era of communal social structures, was already known in the Middle Ages.

Realistic depictions of Žaltys have persisted in folk art to the present day. This motif, originating in primitive communal society, remained alive even during the capitalist era. Realistic images of snakes or Žaltys appear on various tools, furniture, boxes, towel racks, sleighs, and brushes.

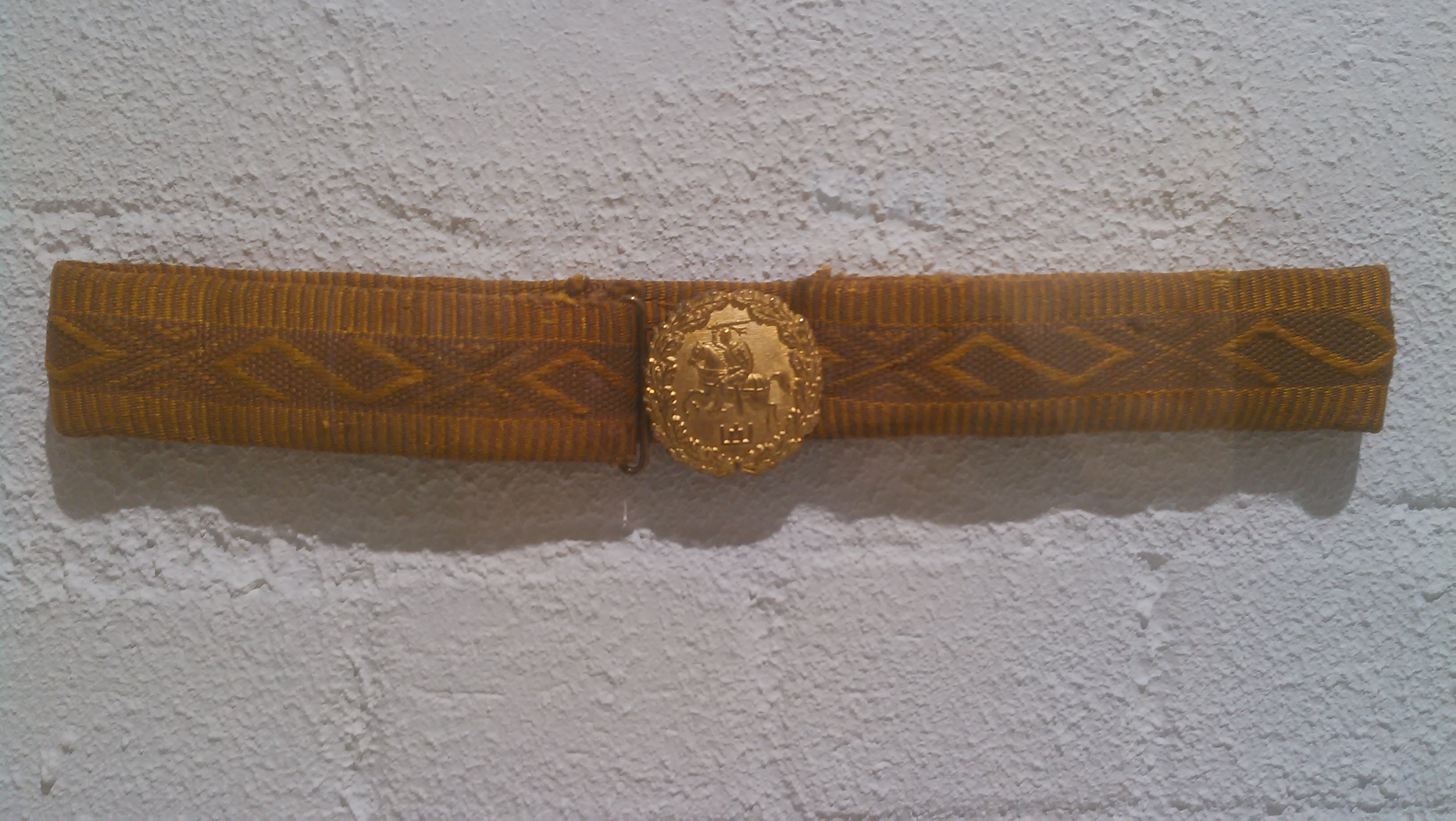
Parade belt of an officer of the Lithuanian Army with simplified Žaltys decoration

Alongside realistic depictions, there are numerous stylized representations of Žaltys. Such motifs frequently appear on Easter eggs, distaffs, architectural elements such as gables. In some cases, they are stylized as spirals. Woven sashes are among the oldest forms of human attire, and their ornamentation - which often incorporates snake and Žaltys motifs is equally ancient.

Žaltys are depicted particularly frequently in small-scale folk architecture; they can be found above window shutters and on wayside shrine-posts. Many shrine-posts featuring images of the grass snake have been discovered in the Samogitia region. In many instances, the symbols are intricately stylized, incorporating additional elements such as small wings.

Lithuanian folk art frequently features a snake or Žaltys coiled around the Tree of Life or a post. This is how Adam and Eve - the first humans in the biblical Paradise, whom the serpent tempted to eat the fruit are depicted. Originating in the social order of primitive communities and passed down through the Bible, this motif is linked to imagery of the Tree of Life. Žaltys imagery can also be found on Lithuanian crossess.

=== Žaltys role in Legends ===
Lithuanian mythological legends tell of two types of grass snakes: those that lived alongside humans in farmsteads known as "house snakes" and those encountered in the forest.

In these legends, the primary function of the Žaltys is to bring prosperity to the home it inhabits. It was said that a home hosting such a snake was blessed: lightning would not strike it, illness would pass it by, and livestock would thrive.

A second function of the Žaltys was its companionship with children. They would sleep in the same bed, eat from the same dish, and play together. If a child happened to harm the snake, it would not seek revenge.

A third function was the administration of justice; Žaltys did not tolerate wrongs. A common motif in these legends involves a snake that, having lost the eggs it laid in the stable, poisons a pot of milk; however, upon seeing the eggs returned, it tips the pot over.

Legends influenced by Christianity highlight the demonic nature and vengefulness of the grass snake. An enraged snake might lash a person with its tail or spit on them, causing the victim to go blind and die.

If a Žaltys was killed, other snakes would typically exact revenge by strangling the killer or a loved one or by slaughtering the household's livestock.

== Literature ==
=== In Lithuanian ===
- S. Mastauskis, „Lietuvos ropliai“, mokslas ir gyvenimas, 1996 m., Nr. 10.
- Liaudies menas: mažoji architektūra t. 1, sudarė K. Čerbulėnas, F. Bielinskis, K. Šešelgis, Vilnius. 1970 m.
- Pranė Dundulienė. Žaltys ir jo simboliai lietuvių liaudies mene ir žodinėje kūryboje. 2005 m.
- Gražina Skabeikytė-Kazlauskienė. Lietuvių tautosaka. Kaunas 2005.

=== In English ===
- Marija Gimbutas, The Balts (1963)
- Marija Gimbutas, The Language of the Goddess (1989) — broader and more comparative, but contains discussion of serpent symbolism and its relationship to the older European/Baltic religious tradition.
- Pranė Dundulienė, The Ancient Religion of the Balts
- Gintaras Beresnevičius, The Religious Centre of Ancient Lithuania and his other works on Lithuanian religion
- Norbertas Vėlius (ed.), Of Gods and Men: Lithuanian Mythology — useful English-language material from Lithuanian folklore and mythology, although the žaltys material is dispersed rather than being one dedicated book.
- Algirdas Julius Greimas, Of Gods and Men: Studies in Lithuanian Mythology (1992)

== Popular culture ==
Polish guitarist Raphael Rogiński named his 2024 album Žaltys after the folkloric creature.

== See also ==
- Eglė the Queen of Serpents
- Proto-Indo-European mythology
- Indo-European cosmogony
- Baltic mythology
- Prussian mythology
