= Šventaragis Valley =

Valley in Lithuania

Coordinates: 54°41′08″N 25°17′25″E

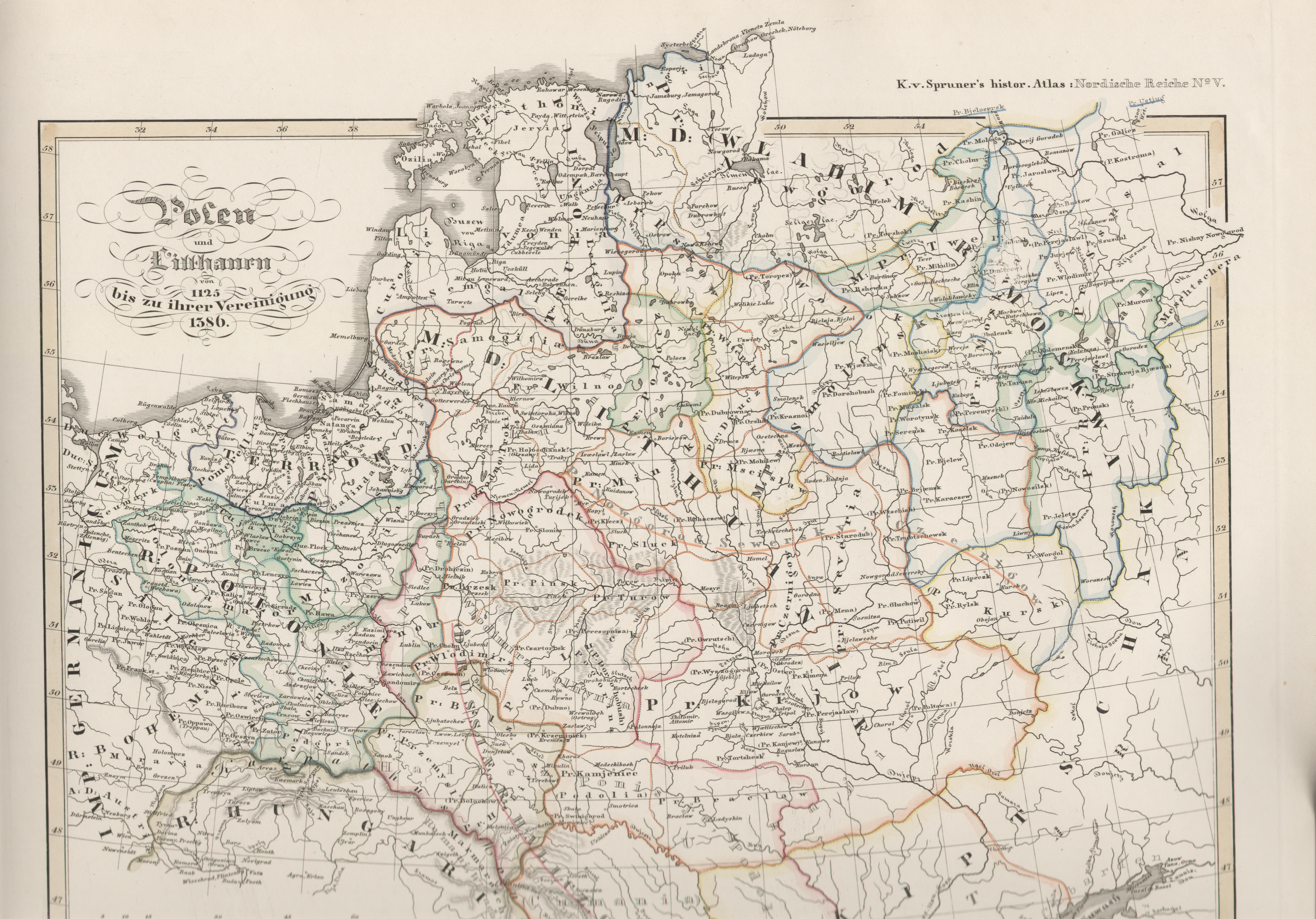
Map by Karl Spruner von Merz (1854) which marked the location of the Šventaragis (Swintoroha) Valley

Šventaragis Valley is a valley at the confluence of Neris and Vilnia Rivers in Vilnius, Lithuania. According to a legend recorded in the Lithuanian Chronicles, it was where Lithuanian rulers were cremated before the Christianization of Lithuania in 1387. Maciej Stryjkowski further recorded that it was the location of a pagan temple dedicated to Perkūnas, the god of thunder. While the legends are generally dismissed as fiction by historians, they have been studied and analysed from the perspective of pre-Christian Lithuanian mythology by Vladimir Toporov, Gintaras Beresnevičius, Norbertas Vėlius, Vykintas Vaitkevičius, and others.

== Legend ==
Duke Šventaragis (from the legendary Palemonids dynasty) selected a beautiful location in a valley at the confluence of Neris and Vilnia Rivers and ordered his son Skirmantas to establish a temple where he would be cremated after his death. He also ordered other Lithuanian dukes and nobles to be cremated here. Some years later, Grand Duke Gediminas was on a hunt and stopped in the valley. There he had a dream about a howling Iron Wolf which pagan priest Lizdeika interpreted that Gediminas should built the capital of Lithuania at this location. Thus, Gediminas became the founder of Vilnius. The legends, as recorded by the Lithuanian Chronicles, do not mention any kind of temple at the location.

== Historiography ==
These legends were retold and elaborated upon by various historians, including Maciej Stryjkowski and Teodor Narbutt, and became very popular. In his work, published in 1582, Stryjkowski elaborated that the valley has a temple dedicated to Perkūnas, the god of thunder, maintained an eternal flame, and was located where Vilnius Cathedral stands today. Narbutt, citing the dubious Chronicle of Rivius, provided a description of the temple's measurements and the rituals performed within.

There is a continued academic debate whether the legends were rooted in a historical fact that there was a pagan temple in Vilnius. A pagan temple, demolished and replaced by a Catholic church, was mentioned in a 1388 papal bull of Pope Urban VI. However, the papal bull is vague in its wording and the descriptions of King Jogaila's actions are similar to those in the Book of Deuteronomy (12:3–4).

In 1980s, archaeological research by Napaleonas Kitkauskas and Albertas Lisanka uncovered remnants of an earlier square structure under the present-day Vilnius Cathedral. Historians proposed that it was the remnants of a cathedral built by King Mindaugas after his conversion and coronation in 1253. They further argued that, after Mindaugas' assassination, this cathedral was converted into a pagan temple. However, in 2010, Gediminas Vaitkevičius published a monograph in which he dated the remnants to 1300–1320 based on artifacts found at the site. This dating is supported by the Letters of Gediminas (written in 1323–1324) that mention a newly built church. Kitkauskas rejected Vaitkevičius' arguments.
