= Sovij =

Baltic sacred place

Sovij (Lithuanian: Sovijus) is a character in a Baltic myth recorded in the Russian translation of Chronography by the Byzantine chronicler John Malalas (1261). According to the myth, Sovij was the instigator of the ancient Baltic tradition of burning the deceased and the subsequent rituals of sacrifice for the Baltic gods of Andajus, Perkūnas, Žvorūnė, and Teliavelis. His other purpose was also the escort of dead souls to the underworld, akin to the ancient Egyptian Anubis and ancient Greek Charon.

== Name of Sovij ==
The origin and meaning of the Sovij name are disputed. For example, Eduards Volters, a linguist, ethnographer, and archeologist of the Baltic languages and culture states that it's a borrowed word from Arabic, while philologist Antoni Julian Mierzyński states that it originates from the name of a Lithuanian tribe. But the majority of etymologists think that it originates from the Indo-European root sāue, meaning sun.

== Myth of Sovij ==
The myth revolves around the three main ways of burial - ground burial, hanging in a tree, and burning. Sovij, after successfully hunting down a boar, gave 9 of its spleens to his children to cook. Instead of cooking them, the children ate the spleens. Infuriated, Sovij traveled to hell. After making it through 8 gates, he required assistance from one of his sons to enter through the 9th. After the remaining brothers were discontent with the son's decision to help his father Sovij, he promised to take him back for burial. After dining with his father, he took him to sleep [to bury] in the ground, while the next day he took him to sleep up a tree. Sovij was discontent with both methods of burial until he was burned in a fire, remarking that he slept like a toddler in a cradle. Sovij also is mentioned to have led souls in hell to worship the aforementioned gods.

== Analysis ==
The myth of Sovij is the first recorded myth of the Baltic religion. The switching of burial methods suggests previous cultures' varying methods. Scholars think that the Sovij myth was a justification for the method of burning the deceased, though they do not agree on the representation in the myth. Two paths of interpreting the myth became apparent - one of them, seeking to find a universal correlation between the myth and other religions (e.g. Gintaras Beresnevičius), and the other - seeking to find a correlation in Baltic tradition (e.g. Jonas Basanavičius);

- Algirdas Julius Greimas suggested that the killing of the boar symbolically represents the fall of the old system of worship and ritual, while Sovij would instigate the new one - similarly to folklorist Norbertas Vėlius's idea that Sovij, by killing the boar became the new leader of souls to the underworld.
- Vladimir Toporov suggested that the boar represents the sun, and Sovij is the creator of the new one, akin to Sovij's name relating to sun and smithery. He also made the suggestion that the myth represented the cult of god, with the sacrifice of fire for the gods being the main characteristic of dedication to the central figure - Perkūnas.
- Jonas Basanavičius suggested that the methods of burial were akin to the Lithuanian ones, and as such saw Sovij as simply a reformer of the burial method, conversely Norbertas Vėlius suggesting that the burial method of the Sovij myth contradicted the methods found in closely related Baltic Prussian myths.
