= Vilnius Square =

Square in Tbilisi, Georgia

- Location within Tbilisi Location within Georgia
- Area: square
- Addresses: Vilnius Square, Shota Chitadze Dead End
- Location: Tbilisi, Georgia
- Coordinates: 41°41′43″N 44°47′33″E

Vilnius Square (Georgian: ვილნიუსის მოედანი) is a public square in the Georgian capital of Tbilisi. It honours the city of Vilnius, which is the capital of the Republic of Lithuania.

== History ==
Square incorporates notably Lithuanian architectural elements. The Stebuklas ("Miracle") tile is an area on the square tradition is expected to turn around 3 times for one's wish to be granted (the original one of these is on Vilnius's Cathedral Square). There is also a wall with symbols such as the Iron Wolf or the Užupis Constitution (in the Georgian language). A fountain and a playground are also nearby the square. It was opened in 2009 during a ceremony attended by the Presidents Valdas Adamkus and Mikheil Saakashvili. In September 2019, Tbilisi Mayor Kakha Kaladze and visiting Lithuanian Foreign Minister Linas Linkevicius opened a renovated version of the square. Vilnius contributed 13,500 Euros to the process of renovation. It is one of many public places in the country that honors Lithuanian support for Georgia during the Georgian Civil War and the Russo-Georgian War.
