= Lizdeika =

Legendary Lithuanian pagan priest

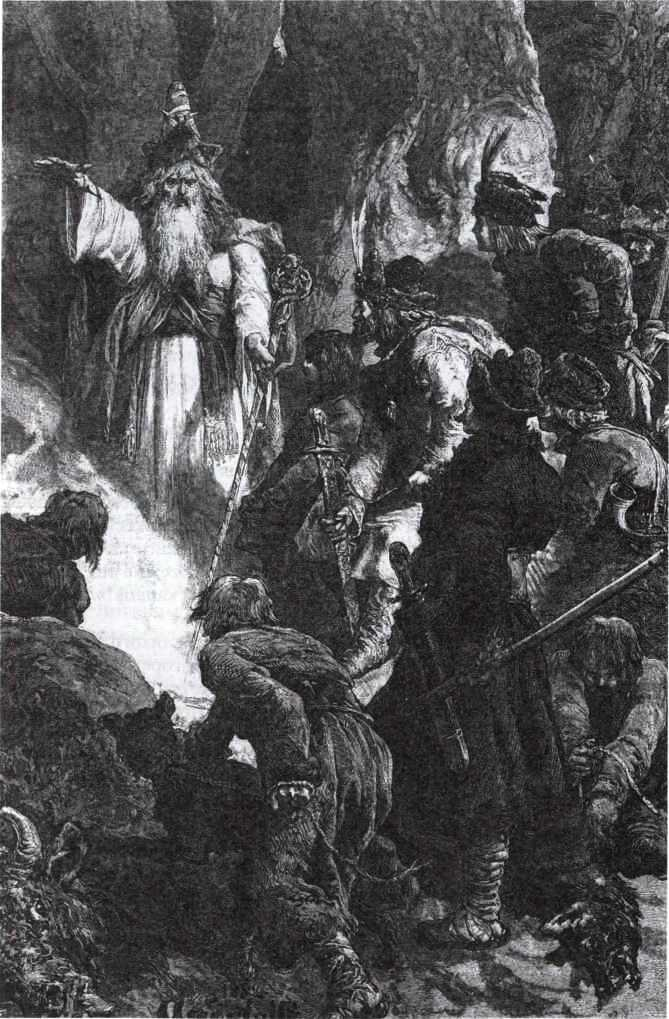
Lizdeika interpreting the dream of Gediminas, by Michał Elwiro Andriolli, 1882

Lizdeika was a semi-legendary pagan priest (krivis) in the 14th-century Grand Duchy of Lithuania. He is associated with the legend of founding of Vilnius recorded in the 16th-century Lithuanian Chronicles. The legend was popularized by 19th-century romantic nationalism.

== Legends ==
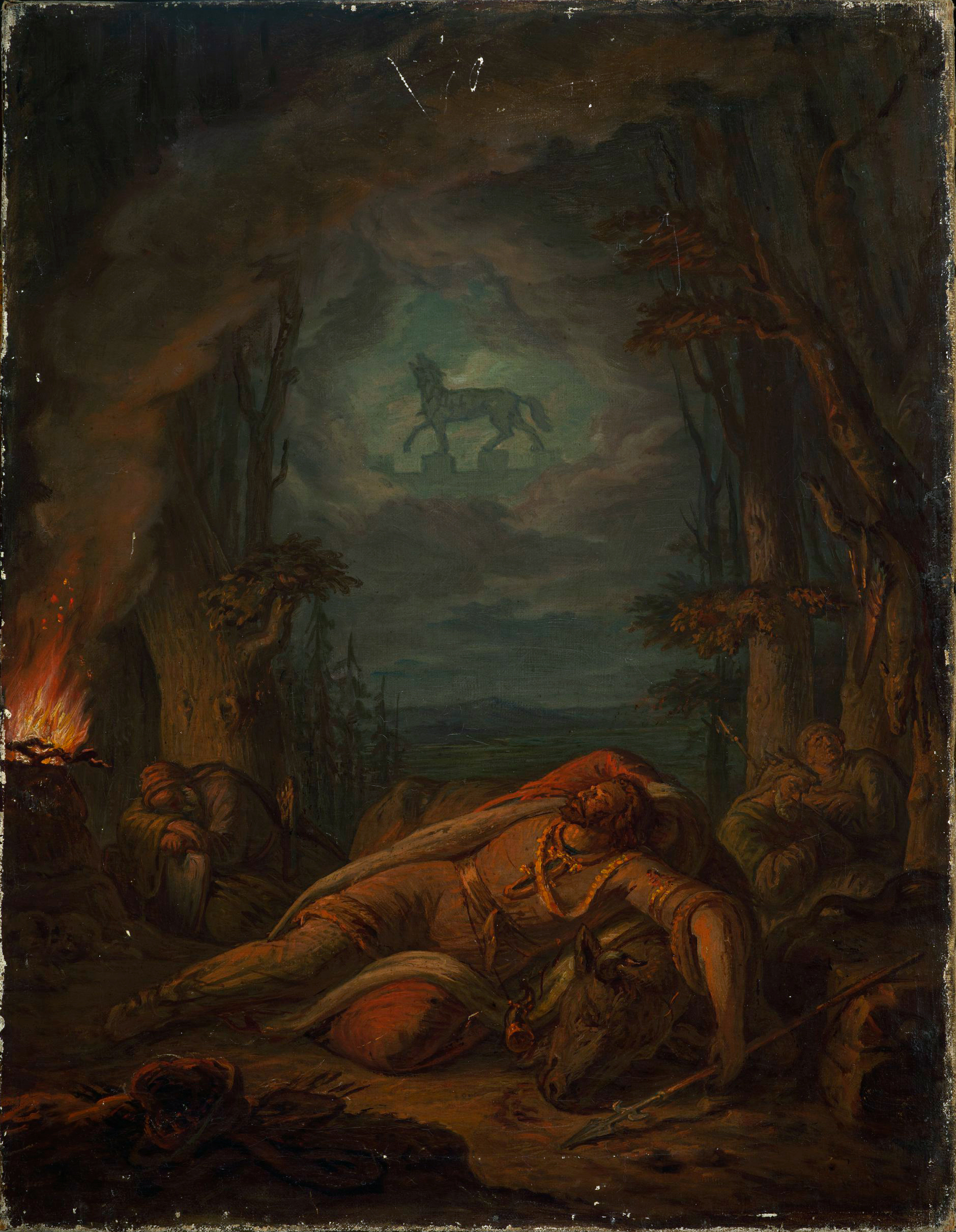
Gediminas's dream, by Aleksander Lesser, 1835

According to the legend first recorded in the Bychowiec Chronicle, Grand Duke Gediminas of Lithuania went hunting in the Šventaragis' Valley, fell asleep, and dreamed of a huge howling Iron Wolf. Lizdeika interpreted the dream to mean that a city, which would become the Lithuanian capital, should be founded at the location. The legend probably originated in the early 16th century. Somewhat resembling the legend of Romulus and Remus, it probably reflects the contemporary fashionable theories among the Lithuanian nobility about their Latin origin.

The chronicle also mentioned that Lizdeika was the chief pagan priest (Kriwe Kriwaito) and that he was found in an eagle's nest (Lithuanian lizdas means nest). Maciej Stryjkowski added additional note that Lizdeika was found in an eagle's nest or, according to others, in a cradle in a tree by Grand Duke Vytenis, who raised him as his son. Various 19th-century authors, including Adam Kirkor and Michal Baliński, claimed that Lizdeika was found in Verkiai, a suburb of Vilnius. Researchers in the field of Lithuanian mythology, including Vladimir Toporov and Gintaras Beresnevičius, analyzed Lizdeika's origin and noted its shamanistic motifs.

Albert Wijuk Kojałowicz (1609–1677), in his armorial of the Grand Duchy of Lithuania and work about the Radziwiłł family, identified Lizdeika as its progenitor. While this genealogy became popular in later centuries, there is no evidence to support it and it is discarded by modern historians.

== Cultural references ==
- Lizdeika is a character in the 1826 novel Pojata córka Lezdejki albo Litwini w XIV wieku (Pajauta, Lizdeika's Daughter, or Lithuanians in the 14th Century) by Feliks Bernatowicz. Due to the popularity of the novel, one of the Kernavė Mounds is known as the Lizdeika Mound.
- Lizdeika is a character in the 1906 Lithuanian opera Birutė.
