= Beresnevičius =

- Lithuanian surname
- m.: Beresnevičius
- f.: (unmarried): Beresnevičiūtė
- f.: (married): Beresnevičienė
- Related names: Beresniewicz, Beresnevich

Beresnevičius is a Lithuanian surname. Notable people with the surname include:

- Aleksandras Kazimieras Beresnevičius (1823–1902), Lithuanian bishop
- Gintaras Beresnevičius (1961–2006), Lithuanian historian of religions
