= Kalvis =

Lithuanian god of blacksmiths

Kalvis or Teliavelis is a deity from the Baltic religion. He is the Lithuanian god of blacksmiths. According to Lithuanian pagan mythology, Kalvis or Teliavelis is a divine blacksmith who creates the Sun every morning and makes rings so the deity Aušrinė can marry it. An assistant of Perkūnas, Kalvis also makes a silver belt and golden stirrups for Dievo sūneliai (lit. 'little children of Dievas'). Kalvis was worshipped by the Lithuanians up until the 15th century.

The appearance of this deity is historically most likely tied to the appearance of Bronze Age and smithing in Lithuania.

== In mythology ==
Czech theologian Jerome of Prague wrote about a Lithuanian tribe that prayed to the Sun and worshipped a large hammer. Upon enquiring on their traditions, the tribe's seers explained that for many months they had not seen any light from the Sun since a powerful king imprisoned it. The zodiac signs eventually used the large hammer and freed the Sun from a tower and returned it to humans. In a similar legend mentioned by Marija Andziulytė-Ruginienė, a young man, while captive by a dragon and put into a dark realm, attempted to save a royal family locked inside a chest. The young man proceeded to take a hammer and strike nine locks in three strikes, thus freeing the family and getting blinded by the light of the Sun coming from the chest. Marija Gimbutas mentions that the deity is similar to Hephaestus, Volundr, and Ilmarinen. The relation between Teliavelis and Perkūnas (the god of thunder) can be compared with the relation between Ancient Greek Hephaestus and Zeus.

== Name and etymology ==
The deity was named in the Hypatian Codex and John Malalas's chronicle of 1261 as Telvelik. In Lithuanian mythology, the devils (velniai) first discovered the craft of smithing, which was later taken over by humans. Velnias elementally represented chthonic forces and the dead, and can be interpreted as a terrestrial Wayland the Smith who creates by the method of forging. Algirdas Julien Greimas believed that Velnias is an archetypal mythological blacksmith, analogous to Teliavelis by its etymology; the prefix Telia- may be related to tellus, the Latin word for the Earth, and the suffix -velis appears to relate to the deity Velnias. According to Aleksander Brückner, the name Teliavelis means "god of the road". However, Norbertas Vėlius claimed that instead it meant "god of the Earth". Balticist Vladimir Toporov suggested that the name is borrowed from Scandinavian mythology.

The god also goes by Kalvaitis, Kalvelis, or Kalējs. In modern Lithuanian, kalvis means blacksmith, with the word being a derivative of the word "kalti", meaning "to hammer".

== Bibliography ==
- Dundulienė, Pranė (1990). Senovės lietuvių mitologija ir religija (in Lithuanian). Vilnius: Mokslas. ISBN 5-420-00511-5.
