= Chronicle of Rivius =

The Chronicle of Rivius is a German-language manuscript often cited by Teodor Narbutt in his nine-volume work on the history of Lithuania and journal articles. Supposedly written between 1697 and 1730s by Jan Fryderyk Rivius, the chronicle remains unpublished. Lithuanian researcher Artūras Dubonis pointed out many inconsistencies in its authorship, unclear provenance, factual and chronological fallacies, and concluded that it is most likely a forgery, though more extensive study is required for a conclusive determination.

== Provenance ==
According to Narbutt, he accidentally purchased the manuscript in Reval in 1808. He first made references to the chronicle in articles published in 1817. Narbutt did not cite page numbers of the chronicle in his work, though the pages are numbered and he cited the page numbers of the Bychowiec Chronicle. Narbutt prepared a Polish translation of the most important parts of the chronicle and intended to publish it in a collection of primary sources on the history of Lithuania. However, the chronicle remains unpublished and is kept, along with the Narbutt's translation, at the Library of the Lithuanian Academy of Sciences.

== Content ==
The chronicle is written in German with some phrases in Latin and words in Latvian. Narbutt analyzed the chronicle and claimed that it used an earlier Russian chronicle, compiled by Mitrofan, a monk in Pinsk. This work by Mitrofan was used both by Rivius and by Augustinus Rotundus for his long-lost history. Thus, according to Narbutt, the Chronicle of Rivius preserved some unique fragments of Rotundus' work. Narbutt lamented that fragments of Rotundus work, including two genealogical tables, were lost when the last pages of the manuscript burned during a fire at his library in 1838. However, the surviving manuscript shows no fire damage.

The chronicle contains many obviously wrong and incorrect facts. For example, it claims that in 1276 a woman gave birth to 346 babies or that Turks made an assault on Belgrade in 1717. The chronicle also contains many unique, otherwise unknown, facts from the history of Lithuania. For example, Lithuanian and Samogitian golden coins from the 13th century, a Lithuanian pagan flag with a cock on the tip of the pole, an inscription on the tombstone of King Mindaugas, a description of the Perkūnas shrine in the Šventaragis' Valley in Vilnius. Some events are described differently in the chronicle than in Narbutt's works. For example, the chronicle records that Duke Mindaugas, his wife, and Andreas von Stirland, Master of the Livonian Order, traveled to Rome in 1254 to discuss Mindaugas' coronation with the pope, while Narbutt described the trip in 1262 when Mindaugas traveled to clear his conscience of the apostasy and desire to serve pagan gods. In his comments to the translation, Narbutt even debated which version is more correct (though both are proved wrong by the 13th-century Livonian Rhymed Chronicle).

== Author ==
Narbutt referred to the chronicle as Kronika niemiecka J. F. R. (German Chronicle of J. F. R.) and revealed its author to be Jan Fryderyk Rivius (1673–1730/1735), grandson of Johann Rivius (1528–1596). However, in his chronicle Rivius provided his grandfather's biography that supplied no new information in addition to what was already known from the encyclopedias of Johann Friedrich von Recke and Karl Eduard von Napiersky, published in 1831, and of Friedrich Konrad Gadebusch, published in 1777. The biography also repeated some mistakes found in these encyclopedias. Also, the 77-year gap between grandfather's death and grandson's birth is virtually impossible. The chronicle makes no mention of Rivius' father or his own life, other than he was born in Königsberg and in 1689 moved to Courland, where he worked as a pastor after pastor Grott moved to Libau. The exact same information about Grott was presented to Narbutt by Napiersky in a letter written in April 1833. Other researchers pointed out a Johannes Fridericus Ruvius from Wenden who became a student at the University of Dorpat in 1690, but Rivius was from Königsberg and it is unlikely that he "forgot" to mention his university education. Therefore, researcher Artūras Dubonis concluded that Rivius' biography was invented between 1833 and 1842.
