= Iron Wolf (character) =

Lithuanian mythical character

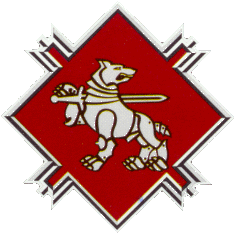
Iron Wolf is used as a mascot by the Lithuanian military (the Mechanised Infantry Brigade Iron Wolf)

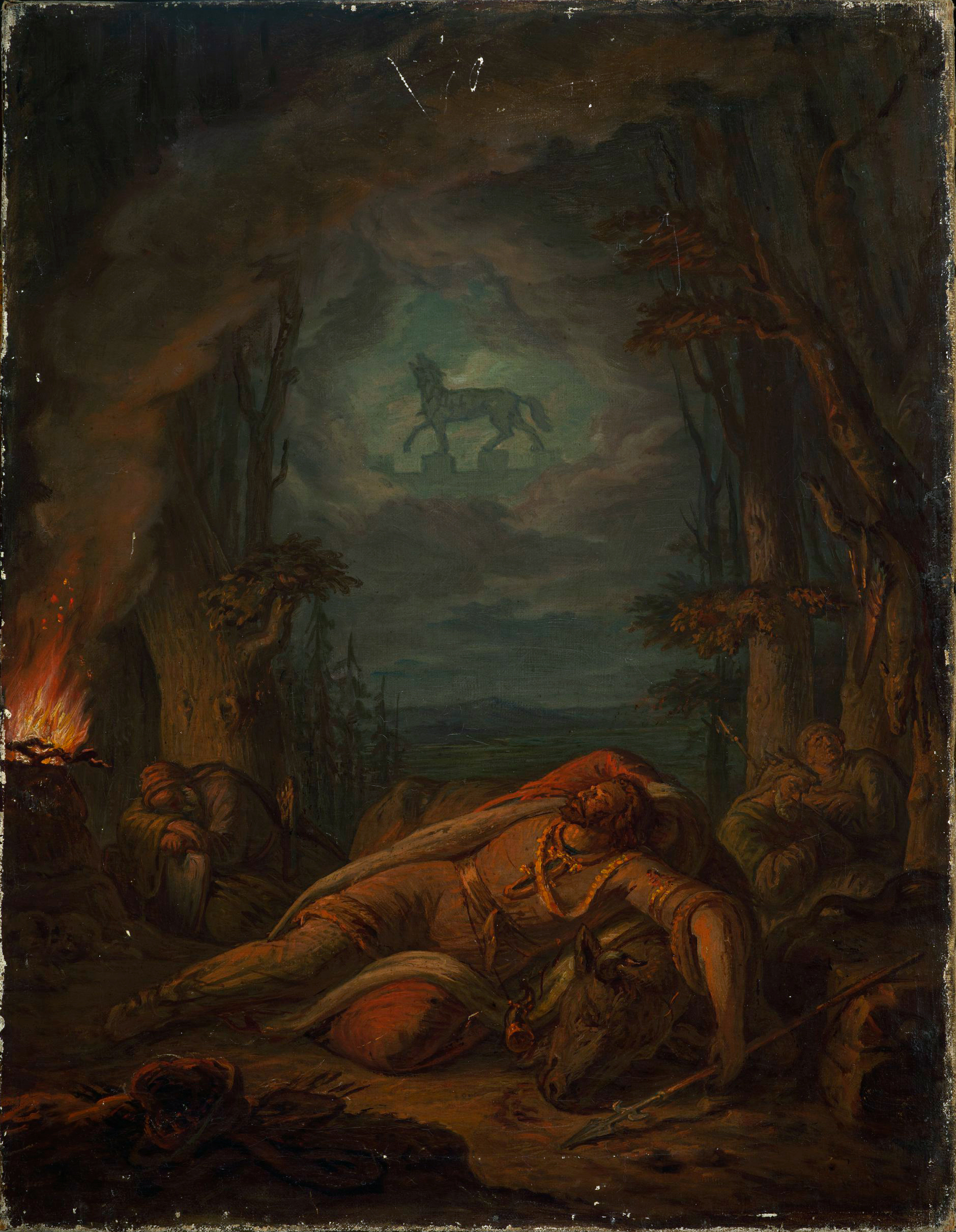
Grand Duke Gediminas dream

The Iron Wolf (Lithuanian: Geležinis Vilkas) is a mythical character from a medieval legend of the founding of Vilnius, the capital city of the old Grand Duchy of Lithuania and modern Republic of Lithuania. First found in the Lithuanian Chronicles, the legend shares certain similarities with the Capitoline Wolf and possibly reflected Lithuanian desire to showcase their legendary origins from the Roman Empire (see the Palemonids). The legend became popular during the era of Romantic nationalism. Today Iron Wolf is one of the symbols of Vilnius and is used by sports teams, Lithuanian military, scouting organizations, and others.

== Legend ==
According to the legend, Grand Duke Gediminas (ca. 1275 – 1341) was hunting in the sacred forest near the Valley of Šventaragis, near where Vilnia River flows into the Neris River. Tired after the successful hunt of an aurochs, the Grand Duke settled in for the night. He fell soundly asleep and dreamed of a huge Iron Wolf standing on top a hill and howling as strong and loud as a hundred wolves. Upon awakening, the Duke asked the krivis (pagan priest) Lizdeika to interpret the dream. And the priest told him:

"What is destined for the ruler and the State of Lithuania, is thus: the Iron Wolf represents a castle and a city which will be established by you on this site. This city will be the capital of the Lithuanian lands and the dwelling of their rulers, and the glory of their deeds shall echo throughout the world."

Therefore, Gediminas, obeying the will of gods, built the city, and gave it the name Vilnius – from the stream of the Vilnia river.
