= Historia rerum ubique gestarum =

Book written by Enea Silvio Piccolomini

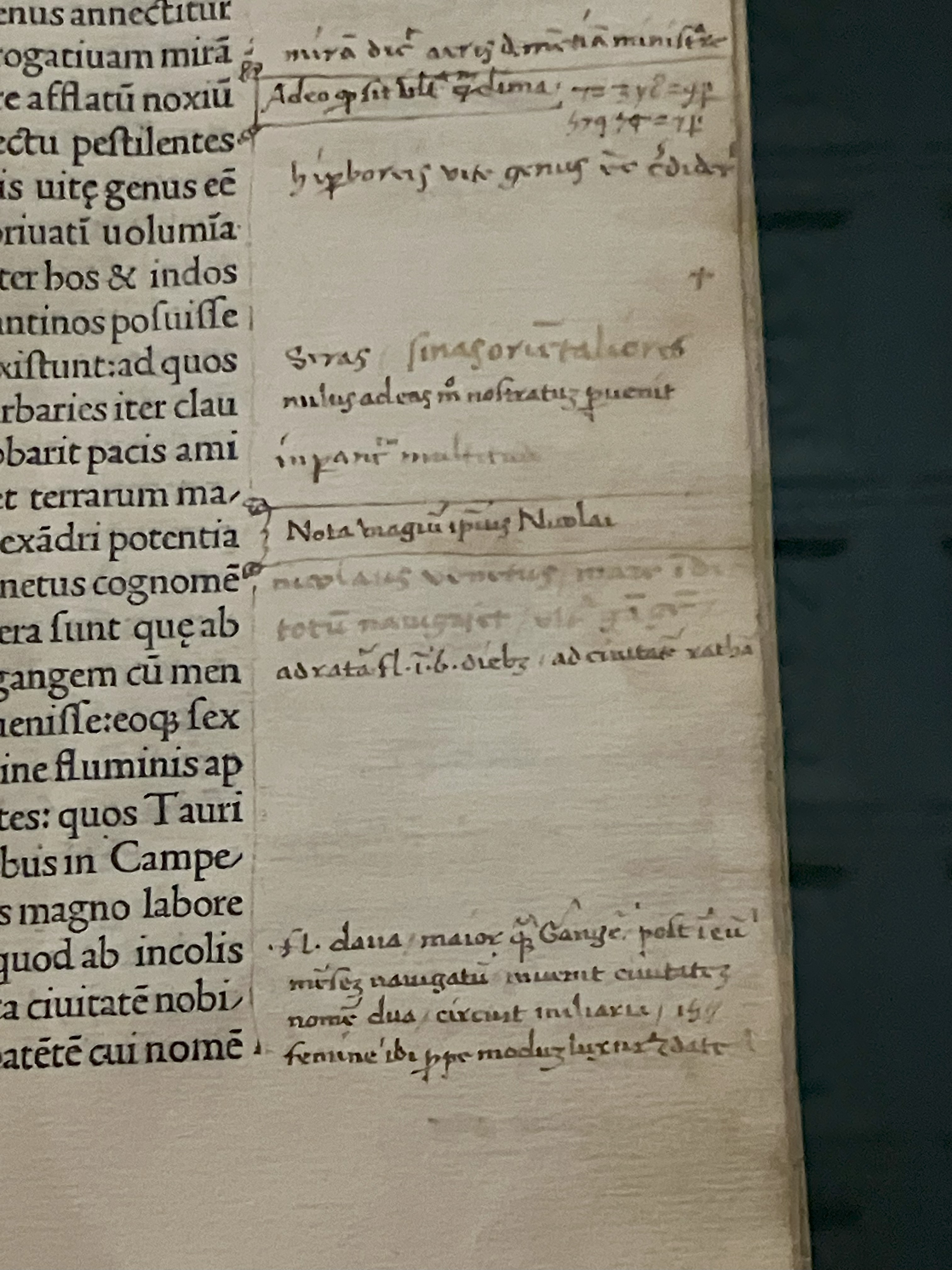
Marginalia written by Christopher Columbus on his copy of the Historia rerum.

Historia rerum ubique gestarum locorumque descriptio is an unfinished book written by Enea Silvio Piccolomini, who was later elected Pope Pius II in 1458. It was written originally in Latin, and the title roughly translates to "History of Achievements Everywhere." The original intent of the book was to record the history of human existence across the globe, as well as a historical and geographical cosmography. Piccolomini planned three sections, on Europe, Asia, and Africa. Only the sections on Europe (de Europa) and Asia (de Asia) were completed in 1458 and 1461, respectively. The incomplete book was published in Venice in 1477 after his death, as Historia rerum ubique gestarum. The published version of the book also told the work of Eratosthenes on the size of the earth and was heavily read and annotated by Christopher Columbus on or after his voyages. Columbus used this as one of the many works from which he pulled his ideas about the Earth. The copy that was used by Columbus to prepare for his voyages, along with his annotations, is now kept in the Columbine Library in Seville Cathedral in Seville, Spain. Historia rerum ubique gestarum has been translated into many different languages today.

The book has been criticized by W. G. L. Randles for expounding "every model in geography... without appearing to see any logical incompatibility between them... At no point in his generous eclectism does Piccolomini make a critical choice between the conflicting theories he reviews, not even to choosing between Homer and Ptolemy."
