= Alka (Baltic religion) =

Baltic sacred place

Alka or alkas (Latvian: elks) is the name of a sacred place or a place for burning sacrifices in Baltic religion. In Latvia and Lithuania alka(-s) and elks is the most widespread component in the toponyms for sacred sites. 120 hills, 70 fields and 50 water bodies (lakes, rivers, and wetlands) with such word in their name have been registered.

== Etymology ==
The words alka(-s) and elks probably derive from the Proto-Indo-European *alku/*elku ("bend, an elbow, turn-like and lift") and may be directly connected with words such as Lithuanian auk(u)oti ("to lift a child") and Latvian auklēt ("to carry the baby on arms and to rock"). Other old Lithuanian linguistic roots could be "sacred grove," "place where sacrifices were burnt," or "sacrifice." An old Latvian root could be "idol." The term alka is often paired in sources with words for "beautiful," and "holy."

Cognates in other languages may include Germanic and Gothic alhs ("temple"), Saxon alah ("temple"), the Anglo-Saxon ealh ("temple") and ealgian ("to guard, to defend"), Belarusian галыконнік ("offering gatherer"), and Greek αλδοζ and αλδιζ ("a sacred enclosure in Olympia").

== History ==
The first written mention of alkos is in 1075 AD by Adam of Bremen. The historian mentions that Christians are not allowed at the entrances of the groves because they will make them unclean. Other sources from the Teutonic Knights and other Christian sources from the 15th and 16th century confirm that these groves were still used during those times.

French historical Jean Cabaret d'Orville mentions that Christians would respect the sanctity of the holy groves. They are called, "holy pine woods...where they burn the bodies of their dead and render them as a sacrifice."

== Cultic practice ==
On these "sacred sites of the Balts", "sacred offerings" were made. These sites included bogs ('alka (os)/aukos'), rivers ('alkupiai') and islets ('alkos salos'). There is evidence to suggest that the holiness of the sacred grove extended beyond the confines of a forest into surrounding rivers and a geographical area. According to oral folklore, alkos are the gateway to other worlds and souls of the dead trapped in purgatory can live in the trees.

In modern times, alkos still exist and are commonly intermingled with Catholic practices. Small groves of trees, especially in Samogitia, can be found surrounded by wooden chapels, crosses, and idols.

It is unclear if the trees were regarded as gods themselves, but they were certainly treated as holy. In pagan times, a tree was made holy by a priest who underwent a three-day fast and completed a blood ritual and/or sacrifice at the base of the tree. Damaging the trees was/is prohibited, which was why Christians destroyed the trees when attempting to convert pagan populations in Lithuania.

== See also ==
- Baltic neopaganism
