= Pranė Dundulienė =

Lithuanian ethnographer

Pranė Dundulienė (February 12, 1910 in Pilypai, Švenčionys district - February 27, 1991 in Vilnius), was a Lithuanian ethnographer.

== Academic career ==
In 1935-1938 she studied ethnology at Stefan Batory University in Vilnius. In 1938-1940 she was an active member of the Lithuanian Science Society. In 1941 she was a researcher in the Institute of Ethnology of the Lithuanian Academy of Sciences, in 1942-1943 - in the Ethnographic Museum of the Vilnius University, in 1944-1950 - in the Institute of History of the Lithuanian Academy of Sciences. She was one of the organizers of the Department of Ethnography in Vilnius University in 1951 where she spent all her future scientific and educational activity. Since 1971 she was a full Professor. Her lectures mostly were related to Lithuanian, Baltic and East Slavonic ethnography. She was a scientific advisor of more than a hundred diploma works and doctoral dissertations.

Pranė Dundulienė published her first scientific paper in 1939, it was related to ethnographic relics and traditions of the Marcinkonys area in Lithuania. Her two doctoral dissertations (1954 and 1969) were related to history of agriculture and farm implements in Lithuania.

Since 1948 each year she organized student expeditions to various regions of Lithuania to collect the relics of old household utensils, folk art objects, crochet works, national costumes, folklore (tales, songs, customs), astronomical knowledge (names of the planets, stars, constellations, etc.). Mythology, religion and world outlook of the ancient Balts were permanent subjects of her scientific interests.

== Selected works ==
Pranė Dundulienė is the author of 13 books and of more than 500 articles. Here is the list of her main publications (all in Lithuanian):

- Agriculture in Lithuania, 1963
- Calendarian and Agrarian Customs of Lithuanians, 1979
- Grass-snake and its Symbols in Lithuanian Folk Art and Folklore, 1979
- Trees in Beliefs of the Ancient Lithuanians, 1979
- Lithuanian Ethnography, 1982
- Birds in the Ancient Religion and Art of Lithuanians, 1982
- Fire in Lithuanian World Outlook, 1985
- The People Cosmology of Lithuanians, 1989
- Heathenism in Lithuania, 1989
- Mythology and Religion of the Ancient Lithuanians, 1989
- Lithuanian Ethnology, 1991
- Lithuanian Feasts: Traditions, Customs and Rituals, 1991
- The Arbor Vitae in Lithuanian Art and Folklore, 1994

She also published her personal account of Polish Home Army murdering 3 Lithuanian civilians in July 1944 during Operation Ostra Brama in Vilnius.
