= Teodor Narbutt =

Polish-Lithuanian historian and military engineer

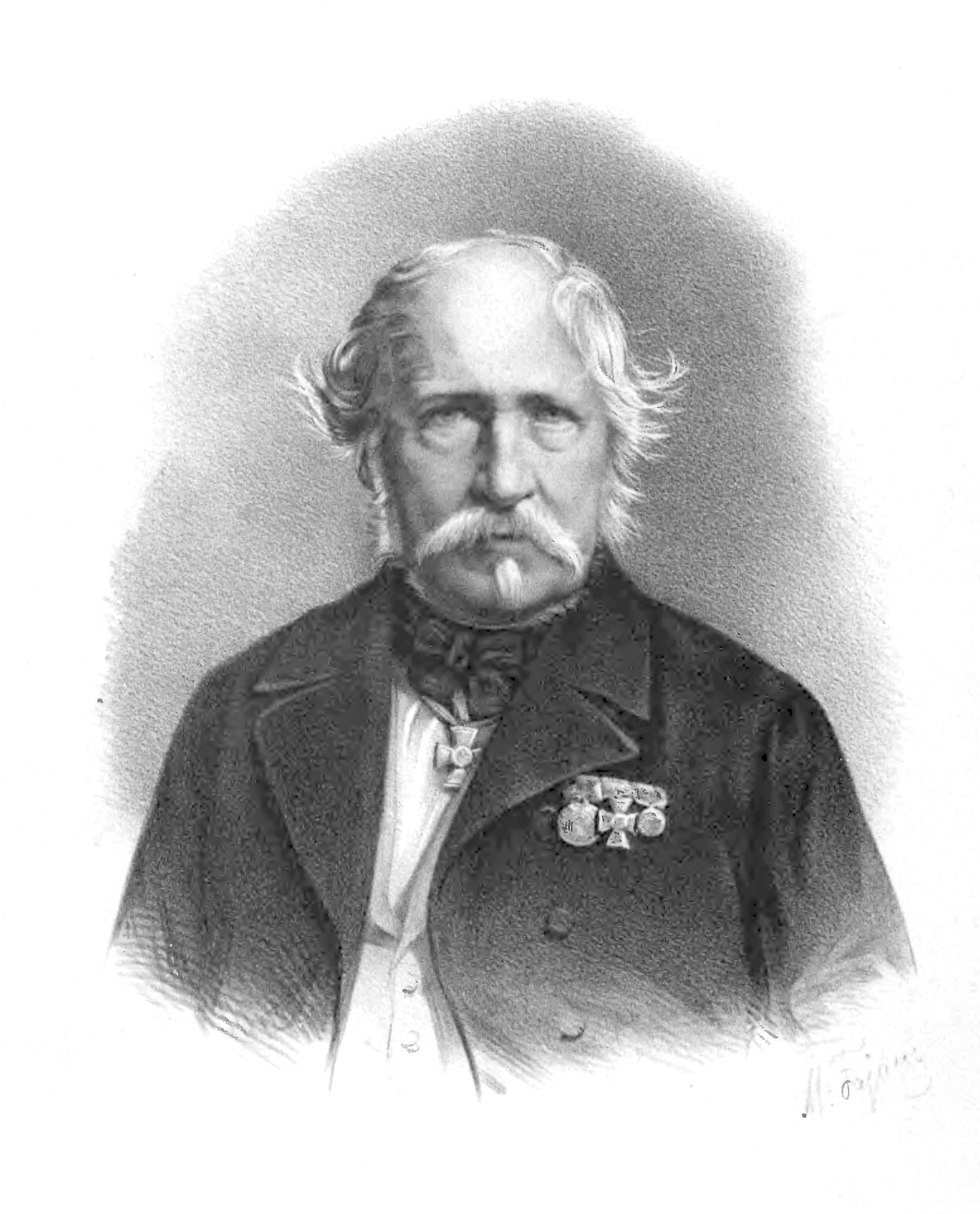
- Teodor Narbutt. Portrait by Maksymilian Fajans
- Born: 8 November 1784; Shavry, Vilnius Voivodeship, Polish–Lithuanian Commonwealth
- Died: 27 November 1864 (aged 80) Vilnius, Vilna Governorate, Russian Empire
- Known for: Author of a nine-volume Polish-language history of Lithuania from the early Middle Ages to the Union of Lublin.
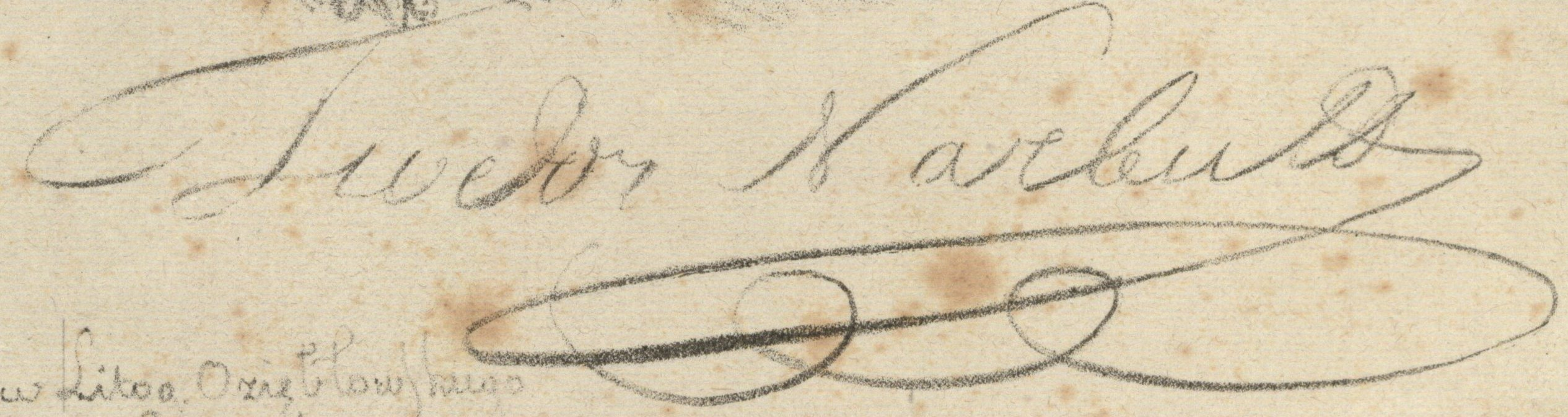
- Signature

Teodor Narbutt (Lithuanian: Teodoras Narbutas; 8 November 1784 – 27 November 1864) was a Polish–Lithuanian romantic historian and military engineer in service of the Russian Empire. He is best remembered as the author of a nine-volume Polish-language history of Lithuania from the early Middle Ages to the Union of Lublin.

== Life ==
Teodor Narbutt was born in 1784 in the village of Szawry (present-day Voranava District of Belarus) in the Polish–Lithuanian Commonwealth, to a notable szlachta family of Trąby coat of arms. Early in his youth his fatherland was partitioned between Russia, Austria and Prussia. After graduating from a Piarist college at Lyubeshiv, Narbutt entered the Vilna Academy, where in 1803 he graduated in engineering. He then moved to Saint Petersburg, where he joined the Cadet Corps. He served in the Imperial Russian Army, where he became a captain in the field engineering corps. He took part in the 1807 and 1812 Russian campaigns against Napoleon Bonaparte. In 1809 he constructed the Bobruysk fortress (modern Babruysk, Belarus), for which he was awarded the Order of Saint Anna.

At the same time, in 1813 he became interested in archaeology and started to organize numerous excavations across the former Grand Duchy of Lithuania. His passion for history, culture and folklore of the lands of the former Grand Duchy was first shown after 1817, at which date he started to write historical articles for various Vilna-based newspapers. He also started to collect copies of documents related to the ancient history of Lithuania, which were published in 1846 in an anthology Pomniki do dziejów litewskich (Monuments of Lithuanian History). Among the most notable primary sources he published was the 16th-century (?) Letopis of the Grand Dukes of Lithuania, also known as the Bychowiec Chronicle, after its founder Aleksander Bychowiec.

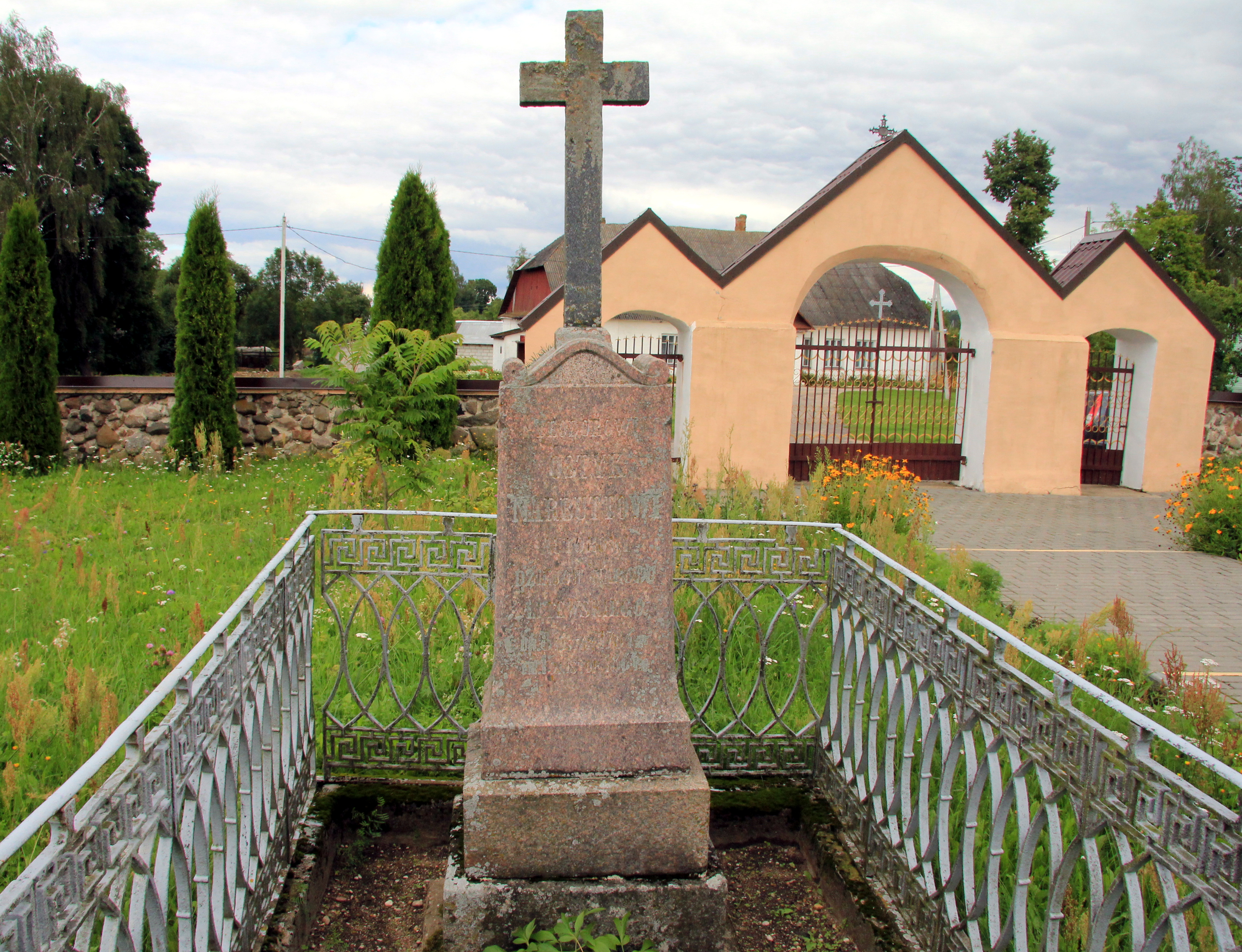
Narbutt's grave in Nacha, Belarus

Between 1835 and 1841 he published a monumental, 9-volume history of Lithuania, covering the period from the prehistoric times to the Union of Lublin. Although largely based on folk tales, dubious and often falsified sources, the book had a tremendous impact on both historiography of Lithuania, and later on Lithuanian National Revival. Its Lithuanian translation became the first history of Lithuania written entirely from a Lithuanian perspective. Paradoxically, the book underlined the Ruthenian past of Lithuania, and as such was highly acclaimed by Russian historians and authorities alike. For it, Narbutt was awarded by Tsar Nicholas I of Russia a gold ring set with a ruby, the Order of Saint Anne and the Order of Saint Vladimir. In 1856, Narbutt published yet another collection of texts, comprising original primary sources and his own forgeries. Among the most popular of the latter was von Kyburg's Diary, a fabricated account of Lithuania in the 13th century.

Throughout his life, Narbutt remained an active member of the Archaeological Commission of Vilna, as well as a notable engineer. Between 1847 and 1852 he constructed a parish church in Eišiškės (Ejszyszki in Polish), now Lithuania. Although loyal to Imperial Russia, the anti-Russian January Uprising brought an end to his family. His wife, Krystyna Narbutt née Sadowska was sentenced to forced resettlement to Siberia and was not allowed to return until 1871. His older son, Ludwik Narbutt, became a notable commander of the Polish-Lithuanian forces in the area of Lida and was killed in 1863 in a fight against the Russians. The younger son Bolesław was sentenced to death by the Russian authorities, but his sentence was later changed to life imprisonment because of his young age. Narbutt's only daughter Teodora had to flee the country and was sentenced to forced labour in absentia. Narbutt himself died in 1864 in Vilnius.

== Suspected forgeries ==
Narbutt had no education in history and is infamous for his uncritical, amateurish approach to historical sources. In the absence of written sources, he often used dubious sources and his own imagination. Some historians believe him to be of good intentions if naive, while others accuse him of actively creating forgeries. In particular, historians identified these sources, discovered and published by Narbutt, as possible forgeries:

- Diary of Konrad von Kyburg, either Latin or German account by graf Konrad von Kyburg of his 1397 diplomatic mission to the Grand Duchy of Lithuania, was supposedly found by professor Ignacy Żegota Onacewicz in a Prussian archive and is known only from Narbutt's translation into Polish as the original has been lost.
- Raudański/Raudonė Chronicle, a Latin chronicle supposedly written in 1488 and dedicated to Alexander Jagiellon, found in Raudonė, traced the Gediminid dynasty to a son of pagan gods and possibly is an example of a silva rerum.
- Chronicle of Rivius, a German-language manuscript allegedly written between 1697 and the 1730s by Jan Fryderyk Rivius is preserved at the Library of the Lithuanian Academy of Sciences.
- Document about a religious student riot in Vilnius in 1644 when Władysław IV Vasa was visiting the city.
- Document about the construction of the Vilnius city wall that pushed the construction from the early 1500s back to the second half of the 15th century.
- Image of the pagan coat of arms of Vilnius that, though very similar to the current coat of arms, depicted not Saint Christopher but a mythological giant Alcis carrying a woman.

At least one of his published sources earlier suspected to be a forgery, namely the Bychowiec Chronicle, was conclusively proven to be authentic and a highly valuable historical source.

== Legacy ==
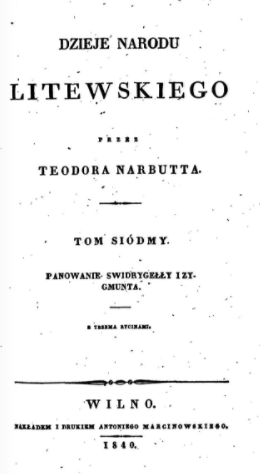
Title page of Narbutt's History of the Lithuanian Nation, 7th volume

Narbutt's nine-volume history of Lithuania (1835–1841) is the first work to separate the history of Lithuania from that of Poland. The work ends with the Union of Lublin (1569) and the death of King Sigismund Augustus (1572), because Narbutt believed that Lithuanian history ended with the formation of the Polish–Lithuanian Commonwealth and Augustus, the last ruler of the Gediminian-Jagiellonian dynasty. There are a number of historical inaccuracies in his books, for example, Narbutt propagated the legend of Lithuanian lineage from the Romans (see: Palemonids). Narbutt was preparing a corrected second edition at the time of his death, only the summary of the Lithuanian history was published: Dzieje narodu litewskiego w krótkości zebrane (1847).

Both of these studies are critically regarded by historians because of historical inaccuracies, but Lithuanians in the 19th century, during an era of the rising national consciousness, welcomed every opportunity to derive patriotic inspiration from the past. Narbutt maintained contact with the leading Lithuanian activists of his day and corresponded extensively with Simonas Daukantas, who in the same romantic spirit wrote the first Lithuanian-language history of Lithuania.

His lack of critical judgement in differentiating between authentic and spurious sources lessened the value of his work today, but his contributions remain very important to Lithuanian history. Narbutt revealed many unknown historical sources, the most famous being the Bychowiec Chronicle. It is the most comprehensive version of the Lithuanian chronicles, compiled from manuscripts dating from the first half of the 16th century. He has also collected and made copies of many original manuscripts, which have provided sources for historical studies later.

== Bibliography ==
- Jean Jacques Rousseau transl. by Teodor Narbutt (1832). Wyborowe ody i kantaty Jana Babtysty Rousseau. Vilnius, B. Neumann. p. 304.
- Teodor Narbutt (1835–1841). Dzieje starożytne narodu litewskiego. Archived from the original on 2010-08-26. (full-text of all nine volumes)
- Teodor Narbutt (1846). Pomniki do dziejów litewskich. Vilnius: Ruben Rafałowicz. p. 205. Archived from the original on 2007-09-27. (DjVu plugin required)
- Teodor Narbutt (1847). Dzieje narodu litewskiego w krótkości zebrane. Vilnius: Ruben Rafałowicz.
- Teodor Narbutt (1856). Pomniejsze pisma historyczne szczególnie do historyi Litwy odnoszące się. Vilnius: T. Glücksberg.
