= Gintaras Beresnevičius =

Gintaras Beresnevičius (July 8, 1961 in Kaunas – August 6, 2006 in Vilnius) was a Lithuanian historian of religions specializing in Baltic mythology. He together with Norbertas Vėlius is considered to be the best specialist in Lithuanian mythology.

In 1984 he graduated from Vilnius University, Faculty of History. Since 1986 he worked at various universities. In 1993 he received his Ph.D. He published over 100 scientific articles. Beresnevičius worked with journal "Naujasis Židinys" (English:The New Hearth) and weekly "Šiaurės Atėnai" (English: Northern Athens). In 2001 he received an award from the President of Lithuania for his collection of essays on history of Lithuania called "Ant laiko ašmenų." In 2003 he published textbooks on religious studies for high schools.

Besides scientific work, Beresnevičius was also a writer and a publicist. He published novels, several poems, and numerous essays (many of them under various pseudonyms such as Antanas Sereda). His short stories were influenced by Daniil Kharms.

In 2004 he rallied for Kazimira Prunskienė when she ran in the Presidential elections.

== Major works ==
- Dausos: pomirtinio gyvenimo samprata senojoje lietuvių pasaulėžiūroje (Dausos: Concept of Afterlife in Ancient Lithuanian Worldview) (1990).
- Baltų religinės reformos (Reforms of Baltic Religions) (1995).
- Religijų istorijos metmenys (Outline of History of Religions) (1997).
- Religijotyros įvadas (Introduction to Religious Studies) (1997).
- Trumpas lietuvių ir prūsų religijos žodynas (Short Dictionary of Lithuanian and Prussian Religion) (2001).
- Ant laiko ašmenų (eseistika). Vilnius: Aidai, 2002. ISBN 9955-445-41-6
- Imperijos darymas: Lietuviškos ideologijos metmenys (Making Empire: Outline of Lithuanian Ideology) (2003).
- Eglė žalčių karalienė ir lietuvių teogoninis mitas (Eglė The Queen of Grass-Snakes and Lithuanian Theogonic Myth) (2003).
- Palemono mazgas. Palemono legendos periferinis turinys (Palemonas' Knot. Peripheral Content of Palemonas Legend) (2003).
- Lietuvių religija ir mitologija: sisteminė studija (Lithuanian Religion and Mythology: Systematic Study) (2004).
