= Norbertas Vėlius =

Lithuanian folklorist

Norbertas Vėlius (1 January 1938 in Gulbės, near Šilalė – 23 June 1996 in Vilnius, buried in the Antakalnis Cemetery) was a Lithuanian folklorist specializing in Lithuanian mythology.

== Major works ==
Grave of Norbertas Vėlius at the Antakalnis Cemetery

- Mitinės lietuvių sakmių būtybės (1977) OCLC 186317016
- Laumių dovanos (1979) OCLC 5799779 (translated into Russian as Цветок папоротника: литовские мифологические сказания in 1989, into English as Lithuanian mythological tales in 1998)
- Senovės baltų pasaulėžiūra (1983) OCLC 10021017 (translated into English as The World Outlook of the Ancient Balts in 1989)
- Chtoniškasis lietuvių mitologijos pasaulis (1987) OCLC 18359555
- Baltų religijos ir mitologijos šaltiniai, 4 volumes (1996–2005). ISBN 5-420-01579-X
