= Celestial wedding in Baltic folklore =

Baltic mythological song complex

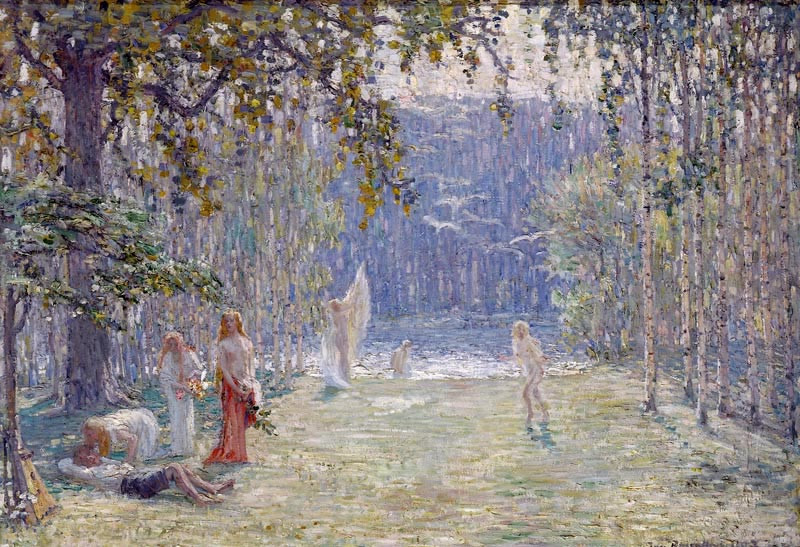
Jānis Rozentāls, Saules meitas (Daughters of the Sun), c. 1912

The celestial wedding in Baltic folklore is a complex of mythological motifs preserved chiefly in Latvian dainas and, in a smaller and textually more disputed body, Lithuanian folk song and folk belief. Its figures are personified celestial bodies and deities: Saulė (the Sun), Mēness/Mėnulis (the Moon), Auseklis/Aušrinė (the Morning Star), the Dieva Dēli (Sons of Dievs), the Saules meitas (Daughters of the Sun), and Pērkons/Perkūnas (Thunder). Their courtships, marriages, kinship obligations, quarrels, and punishments unfold in a sky imagined through the social and material world of a Baltic farmstead.

The tradition does not preserve one canonical plot. Latvian songs distribute its episodes across short, highly variable texts. Suitors arrive at the Sun's gate; the Sons of Dievs heat a celestial bathhouse; the bride dresses in silver and receives a dowry; and Pērkons joins or disrupts the procession. A golden oak or apple tree is shattered at the gate, and Saule or her daughter spends three years gathering its branches. Other songs link the wedding to drowning, a nine-branched linden, a kokle carved from the tree, a sunshower, or a bridegroom from the realm of the dead.

Lithuanian material concentrates the best-known sequence in songs published by Martynas Liudvikas Rėza in 1825. Moon marries Sun, deserts her for Aušrinė, and is cleft by an angry Perkūnas. In a companion song, Perkūnas destroys an oak at Aušrinė's wedding, and blood from the tree stains the wedding clothing. The apparent unity of these texts has been weakened by research tracing parts of Rėza's versions to Latvian print sources and to successive editorial reworking.

Since Wilhelm Mannhardt's 1875 study, interpretations have ranged from solar and lunar allegory to reconstructions of Indo-European myth, analyses of wedding custom, social readings of a heavenly household, and close study of variant transmission. Current research treats the cycle as a changing song complex: astronomical observation, wedding language, tree symbolism, oral formulas, collection practices, and editorial intervention all shaped the surviving record.

== Terminology and scope ==
Celestial wedding and heavenly wedding are the usual English translations of the analytical term used in Baltic scholarship, including Lithuanian dangiškosios vestuvės. The label covers songs about divine courtship, marriage, wedding travel, quarrel, and punishment, not a single tale with a stable beginning and end. Vaira Vīķe-Freiberga defines the Latvian solar wedding material as a large corpus of variants on several wedding themes and explicitly rejects the idea of a canonical narrative. Rokas Sinkevičius likewise treats the relevant Latvian material as several song types whose motifs join, separate, and migrate between variants.

The surviving evidence used for reconstruction is overwhelmingly Latvian and Lithuanian. Latvian evidence is much more extensive and preserves the widest range of wedding scenes, while Lithuanian evidence supplies compact Sun–Moon narratives, beliefs about lunar punishment, and the two famous but editorially problematic songs printed by Rėza. The designation Baltic therefore marks a comparative Latvian–Lithuanian complex, not a claim that every motif occurs in the same form throughout the Baltic-speaking area.

The grammatical and poetic genders of the principal luminaries are central to the songs: Latvian Saule and Lithuanian Saulė are feminine, whereas Latvian Mēness and Lithuanian Mėnulis or Mėnuo are masculine. The planet Venus can enter the complex through differently gendered figures: Latvian Auseklis is a male suitor, while Lithuanian Aušrinė and Vakarinė are female personifications of the Morning and Evening Star. Latvian songs also use the singular Saules meita, "Daughter of the Sun", and the plural Saules meitas, "Daughters of the Sun", without requiring a single fixed genealogy.

Whether these texts should be called "myths" has formed part of their scholarly history. Albert Lord argued that a song containing a deity should still be classified by its courtship, wedding, or funeral content and performance context. The short Latvian lyric does not normally provide the sustained narrative expected in a narrow definition of myth. Vīķe-Freiberga answered that characterization, attitude, praise, prayer, and recurrent poetic structure can carry religious meaning even where continuous plot is absent. Recent motif-centred studies distinguish the recorded song fragment, the editorial type-cluster assembled from variants, and the longer narrative proposed by an interpreter.

== Sources and transmission ==
=== Written notices and oral evidence ===
Medieval and early modern writers left only scattered notices about Baltic reverence for the Sun, Moon, stars, trees, and other natural phenomena. Their reports came chiefly from chroniclers, travellers, clergy, church visitations, and witch-trial records; most served administrative or polemical purposes and supplied little systematic ethnography. These sources cannot supply a continuous celestial-wedding story, but they establish the older documentary setting in which personified luminaries and pre-Christian practices were later studied.

A decisive early notice appears in Gotthard Friedrich Stender's second edition of his Lettische Grammatik (1783). Stender recorded a Latvian belief that the Sun married the Moon and that the stars were born from their union, while the Sun's daughters were courted by the Sons of Dievs. His summary predates the great nineteenth-century song collections and shows that the celestial family and marriage theme was already circulating outside the later editorial systems of Rėza and Krišjānis Barons.

Oral song remains the main source for the Latvian side of the complex. A corpus assembled by Vīķe-Freiberga and Imants Freibergs contains more than 4,000 Latvian song texts with the root for "sun", including about 1,500 numbered type-songs in which Saule is clearly personified. The wedding songs form only one part of that larger solar corpus, alongside literal, chronological, meteorological, cultic, and cosmological uses of the Sun. Their meaning consequently depends on formulas and images shared with songs about labour, kinship, orphanhood, courtship, death, and the yearly course of the Sun.

=== Rėza's Lithuanian collection ===
Rėza published Dainos, oder Littauische Volkslieder, the first collection of Lithuanian folk songs, in 1825 with Lithuanian texts and German translations. Two entries became central to later reconstructions of the celestial wedding: "Mėnesio svodba" ("The Moon's Wedding", RzD 27) and "Aušrinė" ("The Morning Star", RzD 62). The first has Moon marry Sun in the first spring, separate from her, wander alone, fall in love with Aušrinė, and receive a sword-stroke from the enraged Perkūnas. The second begins with Aušrinė's wedding and has Perkūnas pass through the gate; one extended text combines the shattered oak, bloodstained clothing and wreath, three years of gathering leaves, and a ninefold cleansing landscape.

Neither text has an ordinary Lithuanian variant tradition comparable with the Latvian song families. "Mėnesio svodba" is unique in content, and doubts about its authenticity have included the possibility that Stender's mythological notice or other printed material was recast into verse. "Aušrinė" closely matches Latvian type LD 34043 in both plot and small details, and Sinkevičius concludes that its textual ancestry lies substantially in Latvian material. Rėza's songs document the nineteenth-century reception and re-creation of the complex; their textual history does not support their use as unedited transcripts of an otherwise lost Lithuanian epic.

=== Latvju dainas and the Cabinet of Folksongs ===
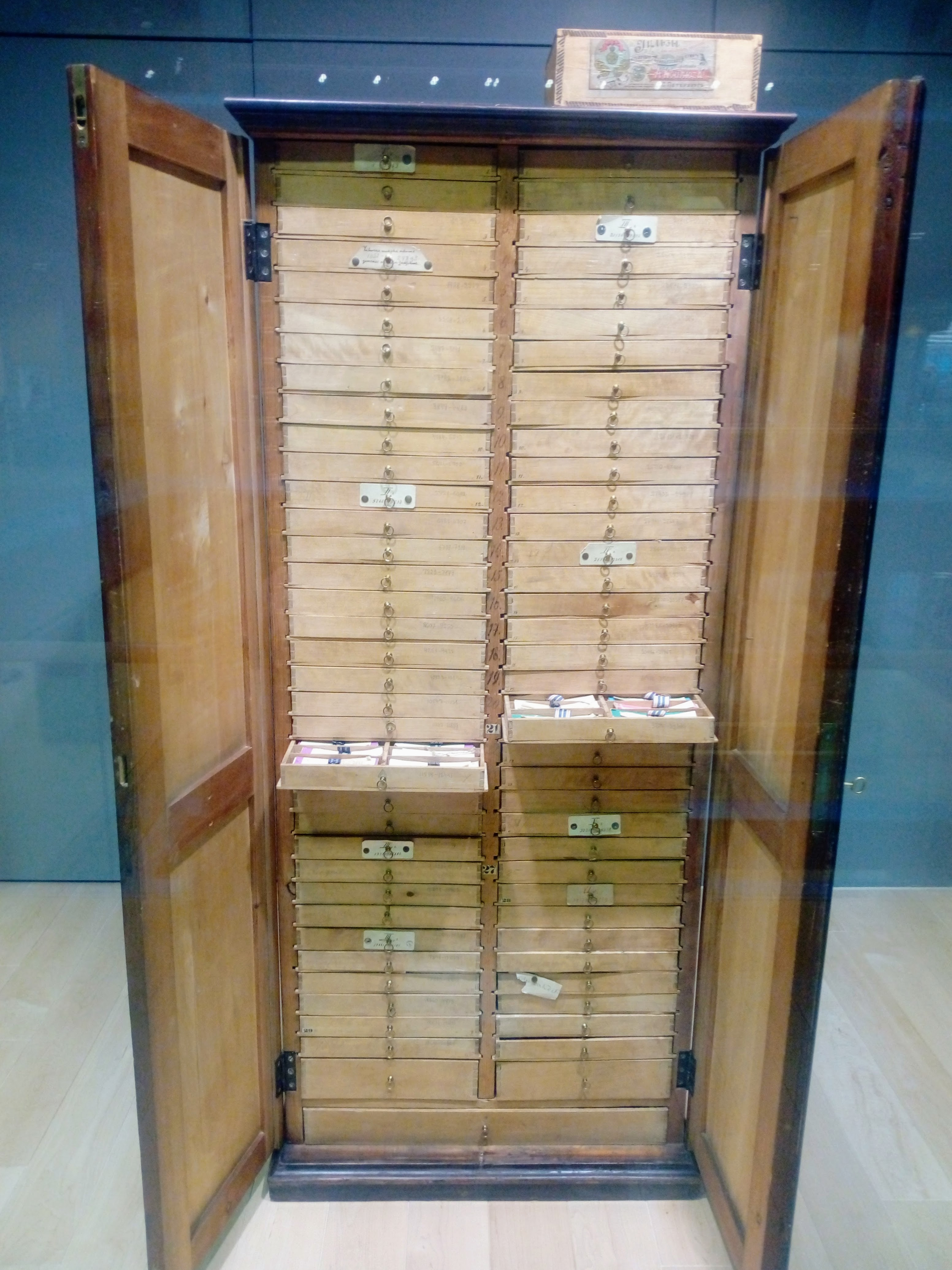
The original Cabinet of Folksongs at the National Library of Latvia

Krišjānis Barons began work on his comprehensive edition of Latvian folk songs in 1878, and the specially designed Cabinet of Folksongs was made in Moscow in 1880 to hold the rapidly growing body of slips. Barons's Latvju dainas appeared from 1894 to 1915 and contained approximately 217,996 published texts. The cabinet holds more than 350,000 handwritten source slips in 70 drawers, including variants, annotations, and editorial marks behind the printed edition.

Barons did not print the slips as an undifferentiated sequence. He grouped related variants into a cers, or type-cluster, selected a pamatdziesma, or base song, and placed additional and minor variants beneath it. The mythological songs appeared in the fifth volume in 1915, and their present LD numbers refer to positions in this editorial system. A printed "base song" is therefore an editorial representative of a variant family, not proof that singers knew a single complete master-text.

Three Barons types carry most of the thunderstruck-tree material. LD 33802 links vehicles at the Sun's door, the arrival of divine figures, Pērkons's blow against a golden oak, and prolonged gathering of its branches. LD 34043 joins the wedding setting to blood-spattered clothing and to a dialogue about washing, drying, storing, and wearing the stained garment. LD 34047 places Pērkons in the Sun-daughter's wedding party and makes his splitting of the golden tree the stable centre of the song.

Principal Latvian song types used in modern analysis
Type	Recurrent material	Variant history
LD 33802	Horses or a carriage stand at the Sun's door; Dievs, Laima, suitors, and Pērkons enter the scene; Pērkons strikes a golden oak; Saule or a daughter gathers branches.	Barons printed a base text and one additional variant; later archival records enlarge the family.
LD 34043	A hero's or heroine's clothes are stained with blood attributed either to an oak or to a defeated devil-like opponent; advisers prescribe a sequence of cleansing and storage.	Barons's type contains ten smaller variants with oak blood and twenty-five with the blood of a devil or comparable being, revealing two joined plot traditions.
LD 34047	Pērkons arrives at the Daughter of the Sun's wedding and splits a golden oak or, less often, an apple tree; Saule then mourns and gathers the remains.	Sinkevičius counts eighteen developed variants of the stable plot and forty-three additional or minor variants in Barons's arrangement, with further twentieth-century records in the Archives of Latvian Folklore.

Twentieth-century collection continued after the publication of Latvju dainas, and the Archives of Latvian Folklore preserve many later variants of the golden-branch and wreath sequences. Later records are valuable evidence of geographical spread and continued variation, but a close verbal match with Barons's printed text can also indicate influence from the published collection. Between 1998 and 2006 the cabinet slips were scanned and transcribed into machine-readable form for online access through Dainu skapis. UNESCO added the Cabinet of Folksongs to the Memory of the World Register in 2001.

=== Fragmentation, variants, and contamination ===
Latvian dainas compress action into short lyric units, and the celestial wedding often survives as one scene, one dialogue, or one striking image. A singer could join a thunderstroke to a branch-gathering formula, replace Saule with an orphan, substitute an apple tree for an oak, or attach a wreath-making close drawn from another song group. Sinkevičius identifies several of these changes as adaptations from other song groups or from widely used formulas about female hardship.

Folklorists use contamination for the joining of material from previously separate song plots. The oak-blood branch of LD 34043 offers a documented example. A song about ascent to heaven in search of dead parents absorbed imagery from the Daughter of the Sun's wedding, and the blood formerly assigned to a defeated devil-like being was reassigned to the oak. In these contaminated variants, elements with separate plot histories occur in a single text.

Sinkevičius's analyses separate the exact recorded variant, the editorial type assembled from variants, and the longer mythological narrative proposed by an interpreter. They also trace rare, late, or transferred lines before using them in ritual, astronomical, or comparative interpretation.

== Celestial figures ==
=== Saule and Saulė ===
Saule is the dominant female figure in Latvian celestial song and can appear as bride, wife, mother of the bride, household mistress, traveller, mourner, judge, or protector. She crosses the Hill of Heaven in a chariot or sleigh, reaches the shore of the World Sea in the evening, and returns eastward by boat for the next dawn. Horizon gates and trees mark the passages between her visible daytime course and the "other Sun" of night and death.

At a Daughter of the Sun's wedding, Saule gives dowry objects to trees: patterned mittens or a woven belt to an oak, a woollen cloak to a linden, and rings to slender alders. The gift scene draws poetic force from a Latvian wordplay between giving gifts and gilding the treetops, which links human dowry distribution with the light of sunset. When Pērkons breaks the wedding tree, Saule becomes the principal mourner and gatherer of its golden remains.

Lithuanian Saulė appears most prominently as Moon's wife and as the mother of the star-maiden whom Moon illicitly loves. In Lithuanian and Latvian accounts the punishment of Moon can be carried out either by the Thunderer or by the Sun herself. Vīķe-Freiberga also interprets Saule's regular course in Latvian solar songs as an image of order, fairness, and the exposure of wrongdoing.

=== Daughters of the Sun ===
The Saules meitas occupy the centre of the Latvian wedding scenes, although individual songs may use one daughter, several daughters, or an unnamed maiden. They are courted by Auseklis, the Sons of Dievs, Mēness, Pērkons, and, less often, Dievs, with no single bridegroom prevailing across the whole corpus. Their bridal status is marked by silver clothing, wreaths, dowry textiles, vehicles, bathing, dancing, departure from the Sun's household, and conflict at the gate.

Outside the immediate wedding action, the daughters wash cups, scrub linden tables, knit mittens, weave shirts, herd cattle, sweep paths, grind meal, and cook. These tasks place the celestial household in the material vocabulary of a prosperous Latvian farm while gold, silver, wind-horses, the World Sea, and the Hill of Heaven keep it outside ordinary scale. Interpretations identifying the daughters with dawn or dusk light are scholarly proposals based on their position around the Sun's daily disappearance and return, not names consistently supplied by the singers.

=== Moon and Venus ===
Mēness or Mėnulis is male in the relevant Latvian and Lithuanian traditions and can appear as the Sun's husband, the father or bridegroom of a solar daughter, or an unfaithful wanderer. Laurinkienė organizes the surviving material around two marriages of Moon: first to Sun and then to a Daughter of the Sun identified with the Morning or Evening Star. The second union violates the first and turns a wedding plot into a case of adultery, kinship breach, and divine punishment.

The Venus figure changes across the language boundary. Lithuanian Aušrinė and Vakarinė are celestial maidens associated with the Morning and Evening Star, whereas Latvian Auseklis is normally a male figure and one of the Daughter of the Sun's suitors. Some Latvian interpretations also connect a solar daughter with Venus, so gender, kinship, and astronomical identity cannot be transferred mechanically from one song tradition to the other.

=== Pērkons and Perkūnas ===
Pērkons or Perkūnas appears in several different social roles in the wedding cycle. He can be a suitor, a member of the bride's family, a wedding guest or follower, a heavenly smith preparing jewellery, a judge of Moon's infidelity, or the destroyer who strikes the tree at the gate. In some variants his blow has been read as an objection to an unsuitable groom, but most songs do not state a single consistent motive.

Sinkevičius compares the Thunderer's arrival at a gate with the confrontational meeting of wedding parties at a boundary, and several variants align Pērkons more closely with the bride's side. In the Sun–Moon sequence, his sword or thunderstroke punishes marital infidelity and accounts for the damaged appearance of the waning Moon. Across the variants, Pērkons is assigned meteorological, judicial, craft, kinship, and ritual functions.

=== Sons of Dievs and other participants ===
The Dieva dēli are paired male figures who court the Daughters of the Sun and travel by horse or boat. Some songs show them looking through poppy petals or branches at the solar maidens, while others place two candles at sea as they wait for the brides. Their close association with horses, sea travel, rescue, and a solar bride has encouraged comparison with the Vedic Ashvins and the Greek Dioscuri.

Janīna Kursīte reconstructs an implied failed wedding in which the Sons of Dievs seek their twin sisters, the Daughters of the Sun, and Pērkons strikes the cosmic tree in response to the incestuous breach. Kursīte presents incest as a comparative reconstruction because the songs do not plainly state it as the cause of the thunderstroke. Dievas, Laima, Māra, parents, and unnamed good people enter individual variants as vehicle-owners, household authorities, fate figures, or advisers in the cleansing dialogue.

== Motif complex ==
=== Courtship at the Sun's gate ===
The gate is one of the most persistent settings in the longer Latvian wedding songs. In LD 33802, horses and a carriage stand at the Sun's door while the text identifies them successively with Dievs, Laima, and the suitors of the Daughter of the Sun. In LD 34047, Pērkons enters with the wedding party and breaks the golden tree growing at or near the gate.

Latvian wedding custom and song mark the gate and door as boundaries between one's own household and an incoming or departing party. The location can be dangerous, contested, and ritually protected because the bride's transfer requires movement through territory controlled by another kin group. Sinkevičius uses this liminal setting to compare the thunderstroke with confrontations between wedding parties, while rejecting the identification of the golden tree with a gate-post.

Courtship can also occur through veiled sight and distant light. The Sons of Dievs look at the solar daughters through poppy petals, and two candles burning in silver lanterns at sea announce their presence. These images join wedding approach to the recurrent Baltic association of divine twins with horses, navigation, and paired points of light.

=== The celestial bathhouse ===
A short Latvian song cycle places the Sons of Dievs and the Daughters of the Sun in a bathhouse. The sons prepare or heat it, bathe there, and dance with the solar daughters. Laime and Reidzāne regard this bathhouse sequence as an unusually distinctive element of the Latvian heavenly wedding when compared with other European traditions.

Haralds Biezais explained the scene through the importance of the bathhouse in Latvian peasant life and through its place in real life-cycle observances. Vīķe-Freiberga also points to the visual analogy between a heated celestial bath and mist gathering on a summer evening. The two studies identify domestic, meteorological, erotic, and transitional associations in the scene without treating it as a literal record of a complete wedding rite.

=== Bridal clothing, vehicles, and dowry ===
The bride's exceptional status is expressed through metal, water, stone, wind, and textile imagery. Saule or her daughter is told to dress in silver because the drivers have arrived with water-horses, a stone carriage, a silvery sleigh, Dievs's carriage, or the horses of the wind. These impossible combinations retain the recognizable components of a wedding procession while placing them in a celestial register.

Dowry distribution extends the wedding beyond the divine family to the landscape. Oak, linden, and alder receive textiles or rings from the bride's goods, and the setting Sun's gilding of treetops supplies a parallel natural image. Other variants assign Pērkons the role of heavenly smith who forges a golden brooch or belt for the Daughter of the Sun.

The wreath belongs to the bridal vocabulary but is not equally old or stable in every tree-strike song. Rėza's "Aušrinė" adds a wreath stained by oak blood, while Latvian branch-gathering variants sometimes end with a girl or solar daughter weaving a wreath from the recovered material. Sinkevičius finds that these wreath endings were strengthened by contact with other song groups and should not be assumed to belong to the earliest form of the thunderstruck-tree plot.

=== Marriage of Sun and Moon ===
The most compact Sun–Moon marriage account is Rėza's "Mėnesio svodba". Moon marries Sun in the first spring, Sun rises early, Moon separates from her, wanders alone, loves Aušrinė, and is split with a sword by Perkūnas. Laurinkienė's reading of its eight lines connects the first spring, the daily alternation of the luminaries, adultery, and lunar mutilation.

Latvian prose belief and song fragments provide parallels without reproducing the same poem. Stender's 1783 account makes Sun and Moon spouses and the stars their children. Another Latvian narrative has Sun cut off half of Moon's head because of his infidelity, transferring the act of punishment from the Thunderer to the wronged wife.

The marriage does not yield a consistent domestic genealogy across all variants. Moon can marry Sun, marry the Sun's daughter, or court a Venus figure; the stars can be children of the first union; and the punisher can be Sun or Thunder. Laurinkienė's two-marriage reconstruction organizes these fragments into a coherent pattern, but the surviving records preserve the events in different combinations.

=== The thunderstruck tree ===
The best-attested dramatic centre of the Latvian wedding complex is Pērkons's destruction of a golden tree. The tree is usually an oak and less often an apple tree, and researchers have commonly called it the Saules koks, or Tree of the Sun. Its position at the gate links the Sun's road, the boundary of a household, the arrival of a wedding party, and the place of violent transition.

Sinkevičius identifies eighteen developed LD 34047 variants whose basic action changes little. Twelve name a golden oak, one a green oak, one a luxuriant oak, one two golden oaks, and three golden apple trees. Even where the surrounding wedding circumstances fade, the thunderstroke and the subsequent gathering of the tree remain strongly linked.

The song rarely explains Pērkons's motive in an unambiguous sentence. Some variants or reconstructions make him object to the bride's chosen groom, while others emphasize his fierce arrival, his affiliation with the bride's party, or his function as a judge. Published interpretations identify the destruction with punishment, wedding-party aggression, cosmic rupture, or the force of thunder, while Sinkevičius notes that no one motive is stated throughout the variants.

=== Mourning and gathering the golden branches ===
After the tree falls, Saule commonly weeps while gathering its golden branches for three years. Some variants give the task to the Daughter of the Sun or to an orphan, and a smaller number extend it to five years or shorten it to three days. Vīķe-Freiberga records the closely related formula in which Saule gathers the scattered pieces for three years and finds the treetop only in the fourth.

The link between the thunderstroke and three years of gathering is one of the most stable connections in the song family. Sinkevičius associates its persistence with a broad Latvian song symbol in which a broken or frost-damaged tree signifies a woman's hardship. Sinkevičius links the replacement of Saule by an orphan to a wider Latvian song repertoire about loss, labour, and lack of protection.

The number three does not provide a secure calendar by itself. In Latvian songs, three years can mark an outstandingly long, difficult, or emotionally charged activity without naming a literal three-year astronomical cycle. Later variants favouring an apple tree and three days show that both tree species and duration continued to adjust within transmission.

=== Oak blood and the stained garment ===
LD 34043 turns the damaged tree into a bleeding being whose blood stains a hero's or heroine's clothing. The same type also contains a larger set of variants in which the stain comes from a defeated devil or comparable opponent instead of an oak. Barons grouped ten smaller oak-blood variants and twenty-five opponent-blood variants under the same number because their concluding cleansing dialogue is closely related.

Sinkevičius reconstructs the oak-blood form through contamination between two song plots. In the older ascent plot, a hero climbs to heaven seeking dead parents, encounters conflict, and soils the clothing with an opponent's blood. When a heavenly wedding of the parents or dead was replaced by the wedding of the Daughter of the Sun, the oak from that wedding absorbed the role of the slain adversary and became the source of blood.

The stain triggers a patterned consultation with Māra, Laima, Dievs, a divine son, parents, or unnamed wise people. The adviser tells the speaker where to wash, dry, roll, store, and eventually wear the garment. In Gustav Bergmann's 1808 printed Latvian version, the directions lead to a river with nine streams, a garden with nine roses, a chest with nine keys, and a day when nine suns shine. Rėza's 1818 and 1825 rewritings preserve selected elements of this ninefold landscape while changing speakers, omissions, and bridal details.

=== Drowning, the linden, and the kokles ===
A separate Latvian wedding variation moves from marriage to drowning and vegetal rebirth. A Daughter of the Sun drowns during the heavenly wedding, her body travels downriver to the sea and back to shore, and a linden with nine branches grows at the landing place. A Son of Dievs carves a kokles from the linden and recognizes his sister in the instrument.

Kursīte interprets the sequence through death, rebirth, seasonal change, and the association of the kokles with a female soul or life. Her reading also treats nine as a cosmological number and compares the episode with the myth of Persephone. Kursīte treats this material as a distinct variation, while Sinkevičius's analysis of LD 34047 centres on the thunderstroke and branch-gathering sequence.

=== Sunshower and the dead bridegroom ===
Latvian tradition can identify simultaneous sunshine and rain as the wedding of the Daughter of the Sun. In one associated song motif, the bridegroom does not descend from the visible heavens but comes from the land of the dead, expressed through the death of a young brother who is now taking a bride. Vīķe-Freiberga places the weather motif within a solar corpus in which Saule travels through gates between this world and the "other Sun".

Vīķe-Freiberga notes that wedding and funeral imagery meet in this group through departure, transfer to another household or realm, altered kinship, formal clothing, lament, and passage through a boundary.

== Poetic world and social order ==
=== The heavenly farmstead ===
Haralds Biezais interpreted the Latvian celestial figures as an enlarged heavenly family living in a prosperous farmstead on the Hill of Heaven. In that model Saule is a heavenly housewife, Mēness her husband, and the divine children and suitors occupy recognizable family positions. The songs support the domestic vocabulary of the model through tables, cups, textiles, livestock, ploughing, mowing, cooking, smithing, vehicles, gifts, and household gates.

Vīķe-Freiberga emphasizes that the heavenly farmstead remakes domestic work and equipment in precious or cosmic materials. Servants mow silver meadows and plough golden mountains, silken skirts hang in the evening sky, and wind, water, stone, gold, and stars become parts of tools and clothing.

Latvian deities outside these song cycles do not form a consistently hierarchical pantheon or a fixed genealogy. Elza Kokare's classification, summarized by Laime and Reidzāne, places Pērkons, Saule, the Saules meitas, the Dieva dēli, Mēness, and Auseklis among the celestial beings but notes that divine functions vary by genre and region. The household relations vary by song and do not form a universal Baltic family tree.

=== Movement, gates, and the World Sea ===
The celestial wedding is organized spatially by roads, doors, gates, hills, trees, gardens, rivers, and the World Sea. Saule's daily journey supplies the largest route: ascent or travel across the Hill of Heaven, arrival at the western sea, nocturnal passage, and return in the east. Vīķe-Freiberga interprets wedding vehicles and bridal transfer within that recurring cosmological course.

Researchers have interpreted the tree at the gate as a Sun Tree or cosmic tree joining levels of the world, while Sinkevičius also stresses its position at the household boundary crossed by riders and carriages. In the song sequence, Pērkons's blow interrupts the procession and is followed by the prolonged gathering of the broken tree.

Water marks another threshold. The Sun sails it, the Sons of Dievs light candles or travel upon it, a solar daughter can drown in it, and stained clothing is carried to streams or a lake for cleansing. The cited studies interpret these scenes through paired transitions between households, day and night, life and death, and stain and purification.

=== Kinship, fidelity, and justice ===
The wedding songs present cosmic disorder through breaches of kinship and hospitality. Moon abandons a wife for her daughter, a groom may be judged unsuitable, a wedding follower destroys the household's tree, and a proposed union can be interpreted as incestuous. Punishment appears as cutting, splitting, blood, mourning, and years of reparative labour.

Vīķe-Freiberga connects Saule's measured course with divine order and social fairness. Laurinkienė similarly reads Perkūnas in the Sun–Moon story as a judge who punishes adultery. The interpretations by Vīķe-Freiberga, Laurinkienė, and Sinkevičius connect the plots with marital obligation, correct exchange, and controlled passage through another household.

=== Formulaic numbers ===
Three and nine recur prominently, but their functions differ by song family. Three years of weeping and gathering emphasize prolonged hardship, and the fourth year can complete the recovery of the treetop. Nine structures the branches of the linden and the streams, roses, keys, or suns of the cleansing sequence.

Numerical recurrence does not by itself establish a precise astronomical calendar. Sinkevičius rejects attempts to equate the gathering period mechanically with a definite span of one to four calendar years because the song formula has a broader poetic use. Kursīte interprets nine cosmologically in her separate reconstruction of the drowning and linden sequence.

== Relations with human wedding custom ==
Human wedding practice supplies much of the celestial cycle's social vocabulary: courtship, parental authority, bride and groom parties, carriages, gates, clothing, wreaths, dowry gifts, bathing, teasing, confrontation, and transfer between households. The cited studies distinguish this shared wedding vocabulary from proof that every celestial scene reproduces a specific rite.

Leopold von Schroeder and Haralds Biezais proposed a direct ritual origin for Pērkons's blow against the tree. They connected it with a Latvian custom in which a member of the bride's procession marks a gate or door with a sword, sometimes making a cross-shaped sign. Similar simulated cutting of gates, doors, or beams also occurs in eastern Slavic wedding material.

Sinkevičius finds the direct derivation unconvincing. The ritual action targets an architectural boundary and usually marks, threatens, or protects it, whereas the song destroys a living oak or apple tree and makes the destruction the cause of grief. The sign of the cross can protect against a devil or against thunder itself, so its ritual meaning does not identify the sword-bearer straightforwardly with Pērkons.

Sinkevičius retains a comparison at the level of social structure. Cutting, striking, threats, and noisy challenge cluster around encounters between bride and groom parties at gates and doors, where control of territory is temporarily disputed. He uses this liminal setting to explain Pērkons's fierce and destructive conduct without deriving the mythic oak directly from the gate custom.

The celestial bathhouse has also been compared with domestic and life-cycle practice. Biezais read it as a heavenly enlargement of a space important in Latvian domestic and life-cycle practice, not as evidence that singers enacted a complete divine-wedding drama in a bathhouse. Dowry gifts, bridal textiles, and household work function similarly: they anchor celestial imagery in lived practice while poetic metals, impossible vehicles, and divine actors transform it.

== Natural and astronomical interpretation ==
=== Sunset and the daily Sun ===
Mannhardt's 1875 solar interpretation treated many wedding images as transformations of the evening sky. He read the golden tree as rays of the setting Sun and the oak blood that reddens clothing as the colour of sunset. Leopold von Schröder retained parts of this dawn-and-dusk interpretation for the stained garments and other colour imagery.

Vīķe-Freiberga's broader solar corpus establishes a daily spatial framework but does not adopt each of Mannhardt's identifications. Saule rides to the western boundary, hangs a belt on a tree at the end of her path, enters the sea or the "other Sun", and returns at dawn. A wedding at a gate, a golden tree, red blood, silver dress, and departure by vehicle can therefore draw on visible features of sunrise and sunset while also retaining independent social meanings.

=== Lunar phases and Venus ===
The cleaving of Moon has long been connected with the change from full to waning Moon. Lithuanian folk astronomy called the interval or damaged portion associated with waning by terms such as padaužos and paraižos, and an explanatory belief said that Sun caught Moon loving Aušrinė and beat him. Latvian variants in which Sun removes half of Moon's head make the visual analogy particularly direct.

Moon's illicit approach to Aušrinė or Vakarinė has also been connected with the periodic apparent proximity of the Moon and Venus. The observation can motivate a meeting in the sky, but it does not determine whether the star is Moon's lover, Sun's daughter, or a differently gendered suitor in every local text. Laurinkienė links the astronomical interpretation to specific beliefs about lunar phases and the apparent proximity of Moon and Venus.

=== Seasonal and calendrical proposals ===
Twentieth-century interpreters developed more elaborate calendars from the wedding songs. Vasilijus Sinaiskis read the two blood traditions of LD 34043 as parts of a recurring struggle for the Daughter of the Sun, with changing victories around the spring and autumn equinoxes. Eduards Zicāns connected the thunderstroke with the weakening of growth after the summer solstice and interpreted the cleansing of bloodied garments as seasonal renewal.

Other studies have identified the Sun Tree with a World Tree, the Milky Way, the axis of the year, or a calendar-bearing cosmic structure. Vyacheslav Ivanov and Vladimir Toporov placed the thunderstruck oak within their reconstruction of an Indo-European "basic myth" centred on a Thunderer, an adversary, and a cosmic tree. Pranė Dundulienė instead interpreted the damaged oak as a symbol of the bridegroom.

The variant record limits the precision of these schemes. Oak changes to apple tree, three years changes to five years or three days, Saule changes to a daughter or orphan, and wreath-making can arrive from another song family. Sinkevičius therefore accepts the symbolic richness of tree, thunder, and prolonged gathering while rejecting a fixed one-to-four-year calendar unsupported by the formulas' broader use.

=== Weather signs ===
A Latvian weather saying identifies a sunshower with the wedding of the Daughter of the Sun. Sunshine during rain is taken as a sign that the Daughter of the Sun is marrying, turning the simultaneous appearance of bright Sun and falling water into a wedding omen. The motif can then acquire a funerary extension through the young dead bridegroom, showing how a weather saying enters the larger solar passage between life and death.

== Comparative mythology ==
Comparative study has accompanied the Baltic celestial wedding since the nineteenth century. Mannhardt examined ninety Latvian Sun songs in 1875 and treated them as fragments of an Indo-European nature religion. Eduards Zicāns later expanded the solar-wedding comparison, while mid-twentieth-century criticism of "solar mythology" made such reconstructions less fashionable in some academic traditions.

Comparative studies concentrate especially on the divine suitors. The Dieva dēli share a solar bride, paired identity, horses, sea travel, and protective functions with traits assigned to the Vedic Ashvins and Greek Dioscuri. Kursīte also compares Baltic twin and incest themes with Indo-Iranian Yama and Yamī, while keeping the Latvian material tied to its own song imagery.

Laurinkienė compares the punishment scenes with a Rigvedic episode in which Indra smashes the wagon of Uṣas with his thunder weapon. Her wider reconstruction also notes remnants of a celestial-marriage pattern in western and southern Slavic oral traditions. These parallels support comparison of a Thunderer, dawn or solar female, lunar male, and disrupted union, but they do not supply missing Latvian or Lithuanian lines.

Václav Blažek's 2022 study compares fragments from Vedic, Greek, and Baltic traditions and combines narrative parallels with etymological analysis of the divine names. Blažek compares related scenes and divine names preserved in different genres and periods, not three complete versions of one text. Sinkevičius's variant-centred method keeps such comparisons separate from the documented arrangement of the Baltic songs.

== History of interpretation ==
=== Solar mythology ===
Mannhardt's "Die lettischen Sonnenmythen" (1875) was the first major study devoted to the Latvian Sun myth. Working with ninety songs, he emphasized natural phenomena, Indo-European comparison, and the exceptional value of Latvian lyric material for mythological reconstruction. His readings of the sunset tree and oak blood established questions that remain active even where his unified solar allegory is no longer accepted.

The solar school tended to translate successive images into successive changes in the sky. Gold became sunlight, blood became evening redness, Moon became a rival or defeated power, and the wedding became a drama of dawn, sunset, or season. Later textual analysis has shown that some passages used in these integrated readings arose through contamination or editorial reworking.

=== Social and structural readings ===
Biezais's 1972 study shifted attention from a sequence of natural effects to the "heavenly family" and its social background. He interpreted Saule as a heavenly farm wife and the divine figures through marriage, parenthood, courtship, labour, and household equipment. Gerhard Bauer's related "technomorph" approach emphasized the projection of tools and productive activities into Baltic cosmology.

Structural and Indo-European approaches concentrated on opposition, boundary, kinship, twins, and cosmic tree. Ivanov and Toporov connected the oak and Thunderer to a reconstructed basic myth, while Kursīte read failed twin marriage and tree destruction through death and rebirth. These interpretations enlarged the comparative frame but often depended on joining short songs into a narrative more explicit than any one performance.

=== Genre and poetic meaning ===
Late twentieth-century debate questioned whether lyric dainas could sustain mythological reconstruction at all. Lord favoured classification by social genre and performance context, and earlier critics had treated poetic fantasy as unreliable evidence for religion. Vīķe-Freiberga opposed a strict division between "real" myth and merely decorative metaphor, arguing that recurrent characterization, reverence, and poetic structure are themselves evidence of cultural meaning.

The celestial-wedding archive consists chiefly of short, dispersed lyric texts. A continuous plot can illuminate relations between motifs. It can also erase the formal independence of a quatrain, the circumstances in which it was sung, and the possibility that an image functioned metaphorically in one context and mythologically in another. Close reading therefore requires both the type-cluster and the individual variant.

=== Variant-centred research ===
Sinkevičius's studies of 2018, 2020, and 2024 move from broad reconstruction to the history of tightly defined motifs. The 2018 study compares the thunderstruck tree with wedding custom and rejects a simple derivation from sword-marking at the gate. The 2020 study maps golden branches, duration formulas, orphan substitutions, and wreath endings across Barons's edition and later archival records. The 2024 study separates oak blood from opponent blood and traces Rėza's "Aušrinė" through successive printed stages.

This method does not eliminate interpretation. It establishes which connections are stable, which are rare, which are late, and which arise from editorial grouping before testing ritual, astronomical, or comparative explanations. The resulting model is a network of song types whose links changed during oral and printed transmission, not the recovery of a single lost epic.

== Authenticity and editorial reconstruction ==
=== From Bergmann to Rėza's "Aušrinė" ===
The textual ancestry of "Aušrinė" can be followed through three printed stages. Gustav Bergmann published a Latvian song in 1808 in which Moon takes the Daughter of the Sun and Pērkons rides in the wedding following. Pērkons strikes a golden oak at the gate, blood stains a brown garment, the solar daughter gathers branches for three years, and Māra gives ninefold cleansing instructions. Rėza knew Bergmann's collection and cited it in the notes to his 1825 volume.

In 1818 Rėza printed a German translation of an allegedly Lithuanian song, "Es nahm der Mond die Sonnentochter". Its content and structure closely follow Bergmann's Latvian text, but Māra becomes a beloved mother, some questions disappear, branches become withered leaves, and the dialogue is compressed. The change of speakers also creates a mother–daughter exchange not characteristic of the corresponding Latvian variants.

Rėza's 1825 "Aušrinė" moves farther from the Latvian form. Aušrinė appears only in the opening line, the Daughter of the Sun remains in the body of the song, a wreath is added to the bloodstained objects, and the ninefold washing and drying sequence is reshaped. Sinkevičius argues that the name Aušrinė supplied a Lithuanian celestial maiden in place of the Latvian Daughter of the Sun, a figure otherwise nearly absent from Lithuanian folklore.

The reconstruction allows for lost or unidentified intermediaries, but the direction of reworking is clear enough to rule out an untouched Lithuanian transcript. Sinkevičius characterizes the outcome as gradual authorial re-creation by several hands, culminating in Rėza's bilingual 1825 text. "Aušrinė" is consequently evidence both for Baltic motif circulation and for the literary shaping of folklore during the age of early collections.

=== "Mėnesio svodba" ===
The editorial history of "Mėnesio svodba" is less fully traceable. Its plot is not otherwise recorded as a Lithuanian song, and researchers have questioned whether Rėza versified information drawn from Stender or from German and Latvian print culture. The opening formula about the first spring resembles wording in an earlier German translation of a Latvian song published in a collection associated with Johann Gottfried Herder.

Rėza's known editorial practice strengthens the doubts. Study of his manuscripts has found repeated polishing of mythological songs through removal of Germanisms, adjustment of stanza and metre, sharpening of plots, and addition, omission, or rearrangement of lines. The song may preserve genuine oral formulas and widespread beliefs about Sun, Moon, Venus, and Thunder, but its exact eight-line synthesis cannot be projected unchanged into prehistoric Baltic religion.

=== Editorial effects in the Latvian corpus ===
Barons's edition poses a different problem because its enormous manuscript base is authentic but its organization is editorial. Selection of a base song, ordering of variants, and grouping under one LD number can encourage readers to treat a type as a unitary narrative. LD 34043 shows the risk clearly because oak-blood and devil-blood plots share a close but entered the type through different histories.

Print could also act back upon oral collection. A twentieth-century singer or collector familiar with Latvju dainas might reproduce or combine a celebrated printed version, making late agreement an uncertain measure of antiquity. Preservation of the source slips and later archival records permits researchers to test the printed arrangement against the underlying evidence.

== Preservation and cultural reception ==
The Cabinet of Folksongs transformed from Barons's working tool into a national cultural symbol. It returned with Barons to Latvia in 1893, entered the holdings of the Archives of Latvian Folklore in 1940, and moved with the archives to the National Library of Latvia in 2014. Its manuscript slips preserve variant readings and provenance that are essential for separating oral tradition from editorial reconstruction.

Digital access has made the type system and source slips available beyond the physical cabinet. Scanning and transcription from 1998 to 2006 produced the online Dainu skapis resource, while the wider Archives of Latvian Folklore continue to hold twentieth-century variants absent from Barons's publication. Researchers can compare the nineteenth-century edition with surviving slips, later field records, and searchable digital copies.

The motif complex entered Latvian visual art during the formation of a national school around 1900. Jānis Rozentāls's pastel Saules meitas (Daughters of the Sun, 1912) directly depicts well-known Latvian mythic beings in a sunlit landscape. Toms Ķencis places the work within Rozentāls's broader combination of Latvian folklore, national romanticism, symbolism, and international artistic form.

Rozentāls's painting presents the celestial figures as a complete visual scene, while the song archive preserves short, divergent, and sometimes contradictory variants. The surviving manuscripts and digital corpus allow those variants to be studied independently of later synthetic retellings.

== See also ==
- Baltic mythology
- Latvian mythology
- Lithuanian mythology
- Saulė
- Lunar deity
- Perkūnas
- Aušrinė
- Dieva dēli
- Divine twins
- Hieros gamos
- Daina (Latvia)
- Cabinet of Folksongs
- Thunderer–devil conflict in Baltic folklore

== Sources ==
- Archives of Latvian Folklore (10 August 2017). "The Cabinet of Folksongs or Dainu Skapis".
- Blažek, Václav (2022). "The Indo-European Motif of 'Celestial Wedding': The Solar Bride and Lunar Bridegroom". Wékwos. 6 (1): 39–65. ISSN 2426-5349.
- Ķencis, Toms (2015). "The Role of Folklore in the Formation of Latvian Visual Art" (PDF). Folklore: Electronic Journal of Folklore. 62: 55–81. doi:10.7592/FEJF2015.62.kencis.
- Kursīte, Janīna (2005). "Twins: Baltic Twin Deities". In Jones, Lindsay (ed.). Encyclopedia of Religion. Translated by Margita Gailītis and Vija Kostoff (2nd ed.). Macmillan Reference USA.
- Laime, Sandis; Reidzāne, Beatrise (2018). "Latvian Folklore Studies and Mythology". Latvia and Latvians. Vol. 2. Rīga: Latvian Academy of Sciences. pp. 91–127. ISBN 978-9934-87-420-8.
- Laurinkienė, Nijolė (2018). "Dangiškųjų vestuvių mitas" [Myth of the celestial wedding] (PDF). Liaudies kultūra (in Lithuanian) (5 (182)): 25–33. ISSN 0236-0551.
- Sinkevičius, Rokas (2018). "Perkūno nutrenkto medžio motyvas: sąsajos su vestuviniais papročiais" [The motive of thunderstruck tree in connection to wedding customs]. Tautosakos darbai (in Lithuanian). 56: 84–109. doi:10.51554/TD.2018.28473.
- Sinkevičius, Rokas (2020). "Auksinių šakų ir vainikėlio motyvai latvių mitologinėse dainose apie Saulės dukros vestuves" [Motives of golden boughs and wreath in Latvian mythological songs on the Sun Daughter's wedding]. Tautosakos darbai (in Lithuanian). 60: 60–78.
- Sinkevičius, Rokas (2024). "Ąžuolo krauju apšlakstytų herojaus drabužių motyvas latvių mitologinėse dainose ir Martyno Liudviko Rėzos dainoje „Aušrinė"" [The motif of the hero's clothes sprinkled with oak blood in Latvian songs and in Martynas Liudvikas Rėza's song "Aušrinė"]. Tautosakos darbai (in Lithuanian). 67: 33–52. doi:10.51554/TD.24.67.02.
- UNESCO (2001). "Dainu Skapis—Cabinet of Folksongs". Memory of the World.
- Vīķe-Freiberga, Vaira (2005). "Saule". In Jones, Lindsay (ed.). Encyclopedia of Religion (2nd ed.). Macmillan Reference USA.
