= List of Lithuanian gods and mythological figures =

The list of Lithuanian gods is based on scarce written sources and late folklore. Many of them were outright invented. Lithuania converted to Christianity in 1387, but elements of Lithuanian mythology survived into the 19th century. The earliest written sources, authored by foreigners and Christians, only briefly mention the Lithuanian gods. Beginning in the 16th century, the pagan religion received more attention from authors, but often their accounts were confused, contradictory, and heavily influenced by various religious agendas. Collection and recording of folklore began in the 19th century, by which time the pagan mythology had become fragmented and mixed with Christian traditions. The cults of old deities transformed into folklore (individual tales, myths, songs, etc.) without associated rituals. Because of such difficulties in obtaining data, there is no accepted list of Lithuanian gods. Different authors present wildly contradictory reconstructions of the Lithuanian pantheon.

== Names from folklore myths and legends ==
This section includes the names of gods, divine or demonic beings, and other personages from Lithuanian myths, legends, folklore, and fairy-tales.

=== Gods and goddesses ===
- Ašvieniai: The divine twins who pulled the chariot of the Sun (the Vedic Ashwins).
- Aušrinė: The goddess of the Morning Star, a dievaitė (lit. 'daughter of God'). Alternatively her name is given as Aušra (lit. 'dawn'). Ushas in Vedism.
- Auštaras (Auštra): The god of the northeast wind, who stands at the gates of Paradise and lights the way for those going to the afterlife. This function makes him similar to Aušrinė; some consider him to be her cousin.
- Bangpūtys: The god of the seas and storms. He is two-faced like the Roman Janus.
- Dalia: The goddess of fate and weaving.
- Deivės Valdytojos: The seven sister goddesses who make garments from human lives (lit. 'Governing Goddesses'). They have similarities with the Fates of Greek mythology and the Norns of Norse mythology, and are associated with Dalia and Laima. They are:
  - Verpiančioji: The spinner, who spins the threads of life.
  - Metančioji: The warper, who prepares the threads of life on the loom.
  - Audėja: The weaver of the threads of life.
  - Gadintoja: The one who damages the weave (causing illness, bad luck, and so on).
  - Sergėtoja: The one who scolds or hinders Gadintoja.
  - Nukirpėja: The one who cuts the cloth of life.
  - Išskalbėja: The laundress, who prepares the threads for what comes after life.
- Dievas: The supreme deity (lit. 'God').
- Dievas Senelis: An epithet of Dievas, where he takes the aspect of a teacher of people and judge of their morality (lit. 'Old Man God'). He looks like an old traveling beggar. Dievas Senelis is proficient at magic and medicine.
- Gabija: The carer of the Holy Fire, another dievaitė.
- Indraja: Jupiter (Vedic Indra).
- Laima: The goddess of Fate and pregnant women.
- Mėnuo: The Moon, a dievaitis (lit. 'son of Dievas').
- Perkūnas: The dievaitis of thunder (Parjanya/Indra in Vedism).
- Praamžius: An epithet of Dievas, probably of later literary origin. Also Praamžis, Pramšans, Pramžimas, or Praamžimas.
- Saulė: The Sun Goddess (Surya in Vedic Hinduism).
- Sėlija: Saturn (Vedic shani).
- Vaivora: Mercury.
- Vakarinė: The goddess of the Evening Star. Also Vakarė.
- Vėjopatis: God of the wind and master of Dausos (paradise).
- Žemyna: Goddess of the deified soil.(Thracian Zemele; from Zamin, Persian and Hindi for 'land').
- Žiezdrė: Mars.
- Žvaigždės: The stars. Children of Saulė (the Sun) and Mėnuo, including Aušrinė, Indraja, Sėlija, Vakarinė (who makes the bed for Saulė), Vaivora, and Žiezdrė. Singular: žvaigždė.

=== Heroes and heroines ===
- Pajauta, the legendary princess of Kernavė
- Jūratė and Kastytis are heroes of a Lithuanian legend, which subsequently became popular, mostly because of its modern poetic interpretation by Maironis. The queen of the amber palace Jūratė may be considered a manifestation of the goddess of Sea in this legend.

=== Local and nature spirits ===
- Ežerinis, a spirit of lakes.
- Javinė, a household goddess who protects grain in barns.
- Jievaras, a household spirit who protects grain. Sacrifices to Jievaras are made after the rye harvest. While cutting grain, women would leave a few grain tufts uncut, which would later be braided into plaits. They would also leave some bread and salt under the plait, and would say: Davei manei, Žemele, duodame ir tau ([You] gave for us, Mother Earth, we are giving for you too), a request for the land to continue to be fruitful.
- Kupolė, the spirit of springtime vegetation and flowers. The Festival of Kupolė (Kupolinės) was associated with Feast of St. John the Baptist (Joninės). In this festival, women picked sacral herbs, danced and sang songs. Kupolinės is also known as Rasos. Compare this with Ziedu māte in Latvian mythology, Kupala in Polish mythology and Ivan Kupala in Russian mythology.
- Laukų dvasios, spirits who run through the fields. When crops waved in the wind, people saw it as the work of spirits. Laukų dvasios include Nuogalis, Kiškis (hare), Meška (bear), Lapė (fox), Katinas (tomcat), Bubis, Bubas, Bubė, Baubas, Babaužis, Bobas, Maumas (bugaboo), Raudongalvis (red-headed), Raudongerklis (red-throated), Žaliaakis (green-eyed), Paplėštakis, Guda, Dizikas, Smauglys (boa), Ruginis (spirit of rye), Papiokė, Pypalas, Žebris, Arklys (horse), Vilkas (wolf).
- Upinis, a spirit of rivers.

=== Various lower beings ===
- Kaukas, spirits similar to leprechauns.
- Laumė, a fairy-like female creature (pixies). Described as white and blue as the sky itself. Good spirit, very friendly with the Earth and Nature gods. However, if anyone tried to use them for personal gain, their punishment would be severe.
- Nykštukas, gnomes.
- Vėlės, spirits of dead human beings.

=== "Demonic" beings ===
- Aitvaras, a household spirit bringing both good and bad luck
- Baubas, an evil spirit with long lean arms, wrinkly fingers and red eyes. He harasses people and tears their hair or stifles them. To children, he is the equivalent of the boogeyman of the English-speaking countries. A misbehaving child could be told by the parents: "Behave, or baubas will come and get you". Also it could be described as a dark or black creature living under the carpet or in some dark spot of the house.
- Giltinė – goddess of death, also The Reaper. Other names include Kaulinyčia, Maras (black death or the Plague), Maro mergos, Kolera, Pavietrė, Kapinių žmogus. Her sacred bird is the owl. Sometimes she was considered to be a sister of Laima (luck).
- Ragana, Lithuanian and Latvian word for witch.
- Slogutis means pain, misery or nightmare. Also can mean fear or bad feelings.
- Pinčiukas or Pinčukas; the word literally means "inhabitant of Pinsk" in Lithuanian (cf. "Pinchuk"). Bronislava Kerbelytė, in her work on classification of "devilish" beings in Lithuanian folklore remarks that often a stranger was seen as an evil being; on particular, "pinchuks" from Belarus were seen as strangers. She writes that in one East Lithuanian legend a pinčiukas is portrayed as a mischievous being. The devil Pinčiukas was popularized by the novel Baltaragis's Mill by Kazys Boruta, especially when it was turned into the first Soviet rock opera and musical film Devil's Bride. There Pinčiukas is a comic character: lazy, easily deceived, vengeful.
- Žiburinis, a scary forest spirit that appears as a phosphorescent skeleton.

=== Holy places and things ===
- Dausos or Dangus ("heaven"), the home of good souls. Dausos is on a high mountain (Latvian Debeskalns, or Norse Valhalla), between two rivers. Like the Greek Garden of the Hesperides, the garden of Dausos contains trees which bear golden apples. Day in the garden is perpetual but outside its confines lies perpetual night. Master of Dausos is Vėjopatis (Lord of the wind) or Vėjas (Wind) who is also one of the oldest gods in Lithuanian mythology. Vėjas is identical to Vayu of Hinduism. Auštaras and Vėjopatis are the gatekeepers of Dausos (Dausų Vartai). While Auštaras acts as the psychopomp of good souls, Vėjas (Vėjopatis) blows bad souls into oblivion.

== Names by written sources ==
=== Earliest Rus' chronicles ===
Some names from Lithuanian mythology are also found in Kievan Rus' chronicles of the 13th century. These deities were secretly worshiped by King of Lithuania Mindaugas after his baptism. Rus' chronicles are considered the best source of information about the ancient Lithuanian pantheon worshiped by nobles and the military.

- Sovijus in 13th-century Rus' chronicles was a person who introduced the pagan custom of burning bodies after death, according to studies by Gintaras Beresnevičius.
- Žvoruna (Zvoruna) was a euphemism for the hunting and forest goddess like Roman Diana. Her name is connected with wild animals. There was mentioned in chronicle that she is a bitch, it means that her zoomorphic shape is female dog.
- Medeina (Medeinė) is another euphemism of the hunting and forest goddess. Medeina also was mentioned in the 16th century by J. Lasicki. She was worshiped by King Mindaugas and represented military interest of warriors.
- Teliavelis (Televelis) was a powerful smith who made the sun and threw it to the sky. This myth survived in folk tales in the beginning of the 20th century. Some scholars, like K. Būga, tried to prove that Televelis is incorrectly written Kalvelis (smith diminutive in Lithuanian). Teliavelis has connections with Finnish Ilmarinen.
- Andajus (Andajas, Andojas, etc.) was mentioned in medieval chronicles as the supreme deity. It may be euphemism for Dievas. It is mentioned in chronicle that warriors invoke Andajus in battle.
- Nonadievis (Nunadievis; etimologized by some scholars as Numadievis) is an incorrectly written name of the supreme god or just another euphemism.
- Perkūnas was the god of thunder, one of the most powerful deities. Perkūnas survived in popular belief and folk tales until the 20th century.
- Diviriks is thought to be one of Perkūnas' euphemisms, meaning "leader of gods".

=== Martynas Mažvydas ===
Martynas Mažvydas in his Latin introduction to Catechismusa Prasty Szadei (1547) urged the people to abandon their pagan ways and mentioned the following gods:

- Perkūnas (Percuno) – god of thunder
- Laukosargas (Laucosargus) – god of grains and other agricultural plants
- Žemėpatis (Semepates) – god of cattle and other farm animals
- Aitvaras and kaukas (Eithuaros and Caucos) – evil spirits

=== Maciej Stryjkowski ===
Maciej Stryjkowski (1547–1593) – Polish–Lithuanian historian and author of Chronicle of Poland, Lithuania, Samogitia and all Russia. In this work, Stryjkowski provided two lists of gods, one Old Prussian and another Lithuanian. He listed 16 Lithuanian gods:

1. Prakorimas (Prokorimos) – the supreme deity. Stryjkowski elaborated that people used to sacrifice white cocks to Prakorimas. Their flesh was divided into three pieces: one for peasants, another for pagan priests (Lithuanian: žynys), and a third for burning. Stryjkowski pointed out that Prakorimas was similar to the Prussian supreme god Okopirmas.
2. Rūgutis (Ruguczis) – god of fermentation and fermented foods
3. Žemininkas (Ziemennik) – god of land and agriculture. The cult of the žaltys (grass snake) is associated with the cult of Žemininkas.
4. Krūminė (Kruminie Pradziu Warpu) – deity of ears, provider of crops
5. Lietuvonis (Lituwanis) – god of rain
6. Kauriraris (Chaurirari) – deity of war and warhorses. The name etymology is unclear. Vladimir Toporov suggested that it is derived from the Lithuanian word kaurai (fur), while Wilhelm Mannhardt argued it stems from karas (war).
7. Sutvaras (Sotwaros) – god of all cattle
8. Šeimos dievas (Seimi Dewos) – god of family
9. Upinis dievas (Upinis Dewos) – god of rivers
10. Bubilas – god of honey and bees
11. Didis Lado (Dzidzis Lado) – the great god. Festivities, songs, and dances in his honor lasted from May 25 to June 25. There are doubts whether this represents an actual god.
12. Gulbis (Gulbi Dzievos) – the good spirit of every human, guardian angel
13. Ganiklis (Goniglis Dziewos) – god of herds and shepherds
14. Šventpaukštinis (Swieczpunscynis) – god of all domesticated and wild birds. People did not offer sacrifices to him as he was a free spirit.
15. Kelių dievas (Kielu Dziewos) – god of roads, trade and travel
16. Pušaitis or Puškaitis (Puszajtis) – deity of land, dwelling in elder bushes and commanding chthonic dwarfs (barstukas)

=== Jan Łasicki ===
Jan Łasicki (Lasicius) was a Polish Protestant activist. He wrote a treatise on idolatry About the gods of Samogitians, other Sarmatians, and false Christians (De diis Samagitarum caeterorumque Sarmatarum et falsorum Christianorum, written ca. 1582 and published in 1615). This 18-page treatise contained a lists of 76 Lithuanian gods with brief description of their functions. Łasicki obtained most of his information from Łaszkowski, a Polish lesser noble who worked as a royal land surveyor. The list contained very minor deities, representing everyday household items. Łasicki was also not intimately familiar with Lithuanian culture or language. Therefore, the academic opinion on the list ranges from a valuable resource to a practical joke designed to poke fun of Christian saints through an inverted mirror. Deities mentioned by Jan Łasicki were:

1. Aukštėjas (Auxtheias Vissagistis) – a euphemism for the supreme god. Derived from the Lithuanian word aukštas (high).
2. Žemėpatis (Zemopacios)
3. Perkūnas (Percunos) – god of thunder
4. Audros – god of storms
5. Algis
6. Aušra (Ausca) – the morning star (Venus). Her other name was Aušrinė.
7. Bežlėja (Bezlea)
8. Brėkšta (Breksta) – goddess of twilight. Also could be a euphemism for Vakarė.
9. Ligyčius (Ligiczus)
10. Datanus
11. Kirnis (Kirnus) – local god of cherries
12. Kremata – god of hogs
13. Pyzius (Pizio) – god of spouses
14. Medeina (Modeina et Ragaina) – goddess of forest and hunting
15. Kerpyčius and Šilinytis (Kierpiczus and Siliniczus) – gods of forest, mosses and lichens
16. Tavalas (Tavvals) – deity of physical strength. Gintaras Beresnevičius noted that this deity could be the same as medieval Teliavelis.
17. Orthus
18. Ežerinis (Ezernim) – spirit or deity of lakes. Derived from ežeras (lake).
19. Sidžius, Simonaitis and Ventis Rekičionis (Simonaitem, Sidzium, Ventis Rekicziouum) – spirits worshiped by individual noble families
20. Karvaitis Ėraitinis (Kurvvaiczin Eraiczin) – deity of calves and lambs
21. Gardūnytis (Gardunithis) – protector of newly born lambs
22. Prigirstytis (Prigirstitis) – can hear whispers
23. Derintojas (Derfintos)
24. Bentis
25. Laukpatis (Lavukpatimo)
26. Priparšis (Priparscis)
27. Ratainyčia (Ratainicza) – god of horses
28. Valgina (Walgina) – god of cattle
29. Krikštas (Kriksthos) – protector of tombstones
30. Apydėmė (Apidome) – deity of changed residence. The name is also known from hand-written collection of sermons from 1573.
31. Kriukis (Krukis) – deity of pigs
32. Lazdona (Lasdona) – goddess of hazelnuts
33. Bubilas (Babilos) – household god of bees, husband of Austėja
34. Žemyna (Zemina) – goddess of land and agriculture
35. Austėja (Austheia) – household goddess of bees, often presented as wife of Bubilas
36. Deuoitis
37. Vetustis
38. Guboi and Tvverticos
39. Veliuona (Vielona) – goddess of death
40. Warpulis
41. Salaus – no function recorded by Łasicki.
42. Šluotražis (Szlotrazis) – no function recorded by Łasicki. The name is derived from šluota (broom).
43. Tiklis – no function recorded by Łasicki.
44. Beržulis (Birzulis) – no function recorded by Łasicki. Based on etymology, it could be a god of birches and birch sap.
45. Šeryčius (Siriczus) – no function recorded by Łasicki. The name is possibly derived from šerti (feed).
46. Dvargantis (Dvvargonth) – no function recorded by Łasicki.
47. Klamals – no function recorded by Łasicki.
48. Atlaibas (Atlaibos) – no function recorded by Łasicki.
49. Numeias
50. Ublanyčia (Vblanicza) – patron of beggars
51. Dugnai – spirit of flour
52. Pesseias
53. Trotytojas kibirkščių (Tratitas Kirbixtu) – deity of spark, fire
54. Alabathis
55. Polengabia
56. Užpelenė (Aspelenie)
57. Budintojas (Budintaia)
58. Matergabiae
59. Raugo Žemėpatis (Rauguzemapati) – deity of sourdough, leaven and fermentation
60. Luibegeldas
61. Ziemennik
62. Vaižgantas (Waizganthos) – a god of flax
63. Gabija (Gabie) – goddess of household fire
64. Smik smik per velėną (Smik Smik Perleuenu) – a phrase rather than a being
65. Ežiagalis (Ezagulis) – god of death
66. Aitvaras (Aitvvaros)
67. Kaukas (Kaukie)
68. Gyvatė (Giuoitos) – black snake (see also žaltys)
69. Srutis and Miechutele – deities of paint and color

=== Matthäus Prätorius ===
Deities mentioned by Matthäus Prätorius (1635–1704) were:

- Žalius (Zallus) – god of disagreement
- Žėlius (Zelus) – god of grass
- Šulininis (Szullinnijs) – god of wells
- Bangpūtys, Vėjopatis, Bičbirbis, Giltinė, Gota, Jaučių Baubis, Karvaitis, Ėraitis, Skalsa, Biržulis / Beržulis, Prigirstytis / Girystis, Ligyčius / Lygėjus, Kelio dievas / Kelukis
- Drebkulis and Magyla - Prussian Lithuanian
- Gabjauja (Gabvartas)

=== Theodor Narbutt ===
Polish-Lithuanian historian Teodor Narbutt wrote the ten-volume work History of the Lithuanian Nation (Dzieje starożytne narodu litewskiego) between 1835 and 1841. The first volume contained a description of Lithuanian mythology. However, modern historians have accused Narbutt of falsifying historical facts and reporting speculations. Thus, some gods mentioned only by Narbutt and unknown from other sources are usually treated as inventions of the author.

==== Male deities ====
- Praamžius (Pramżimas) – highest god, determines the fate of people, world, and other gods
- Ukapirmas (Okkapirmas) – preceded time, his feast is celebrated on December 25
- Viršaitis (Wirszajtos) – protected household, domestic animals. Narbutt claimed that he was equivalent to Auxtejas Wissagistis mentioned by Łasicki and to Roman Saturn
- Perkūnas (Perkunas) – thunder god
- Kovas (Kawas) – god of war
- Ragutis – god of beer, vodka, mead
- Santvaras or Sotvaras (Sotwaros) – god of daylight, poets, doctors
- Atrimpas (Atrimpos) – god of sea and water
- Gardaitis (Gardeoldiis) – god of wind, storm, protector of ships
- Poklius (Poklus) – god of death and underworld
- Kriukis (Krugis) – god of smiths
- Žiemininkas (Ziemienikas) – god of earth, harvest, and darkness
- Patelas (Patelo) – flying god of air, similar to an angel
- Šneibratas (Sznejbrato) – god of birds and hunting
- Kibirai (Kabiry) – a trinity

==== Female deities ====
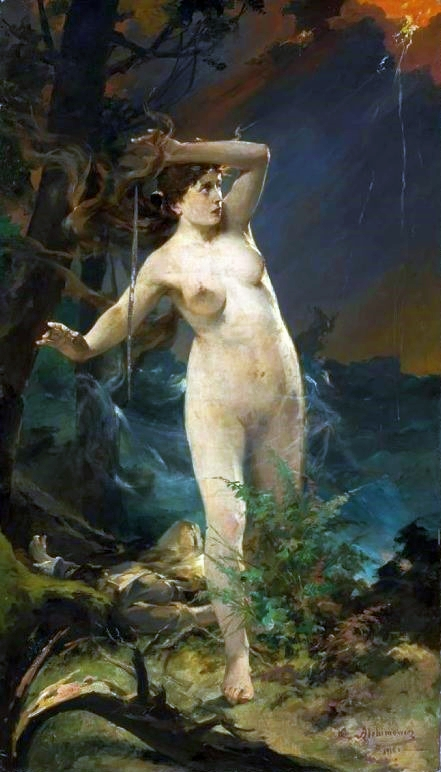
Goddess Milda by Kazimierz Alchimowicz (1910), National Museum in Warsaw

- Praurimė (Praurime) – goddess of sacred fire, she was served by vaidilutės
- Lada (Lado) – the great goddess, Rasos festival is dedicated to her
- Budtė (Budte) – goddess of wisdom
- Laima (Lajma) – goddess of fate
- Pelenų Gabija (Polengabia) – goddess of fireplaces
- Moterų Gabija (Matergabia) – goddess of bread and bakery
- Perkūnaitėlė (Perkunatele) – wife of Perkūnas
- Pilvytė (Pilwite) – goddess of money, riches, and good luck
- Lietuva (Liethua) – goddess of freedom, pleasure, joy
- Veliuona (Wellona) – goddess of eternity, afterlife
- Pergrubė (Pergrubie) – goddess of spring, flowers, gardens
- Milda – goddess of love, courtship
- Krūminė (Krumine) – goddess of grain, agriculture
- Nijolė (Nijola) – mistress of the underworld, wife of Poklius
- Alabatis – goddess of flax
- Aušra (Ausssra) – morning goddess
- Bezelea – evening goddess
- Brėkšta (Brekszta) – goddess of darkness and dreams
- Kruonis (Kronis) – goddess of time
- Užsparinė (Usparinia) – goddess of land borders
- Verpėja (Werpeja) – weaver of the thread of life
- Gondu – goddess of weddings
- Upinė (Upine) – goddess of rivers, springs
- Ratainyčia (Ratajniczu) – goddess protecting horses
- Valginė (Walgina) – goddess protecting domestic animals
- Luobo gelda (Lajbegelda) – goddess of knowledge and rumors
- Mėšlų boba (Mahslu baba) – goddess of garbage
- Budintoja – spirit that wakes sleeping people
- Austėja (Austheja) – goddess of bees
- Ragutiene Pati (Ragutenapati) – wife of Ragutis
- Žemės Motina (Zemmes mahti) – goddess of underground, responsible for lost items
- Gaila (Gajla) – spirit torturing people and animals
- Neris – nymph of Neris River
- Dugnė (Dugna) – nymph of rivers
- Ragana – goddess of trees
- Lazdona – goddess of hazelnut
- Medziojna – goddess of forests
- Pajauta – worshiped woman, daughter of Duke Kernius, wife of Živinbudas
- Birutė (Biruta) – worshiped woman, wife of Kęstutis

=== Other written sources ===
This section contains those names of Lithuanian and Prussian gods or other mythical beings that are mentioned in old treatises on history or philosophy, sometimes accompanied by brief descriptions, and which are known from a few independent sources or from their counterparts under different names in later collections of myths and tales.

- Dimstipatis (mentioned by Jokūbas Lavinskis), is a masculine deity (genius loci). It is a household god, the guardian of houses and caretaker of the hearth. People sacrificed roosters and black hens to the deity. The birds were boiled; later people would gather around the kettle and eat the birds. The bones were burned. Sometimes Dimstipatis is reconstructed as a god of housewives, to whom pigs were sacrificed. Dimstipatis was also seen as a power protecting from fires.
- Dirvolika, Nosolus (Jesuit reports from 1605)
- Pagirnis (Jesuit reports from 1605)
- Baukuris (Kraziu kolegijos)
- Velinas (mentioned by Konstantinas Sirvydas)
- Javinė (Jawinne by Jacob Brodowski)
- Laima (Daniel Klein in 1666)

=== Other names ===
Names of figures that were more marginal in Lithuanian mythology or less known from existing sources are put here. In fact they denote some spirits or local deities that do not play a main role in the mythology of Lithuanians.

- Blizgulis, a god of snow. His name means "He who sparkles."
- Junda, Goddess of War
- Baubis, a household god of meat and cattle.
- Divytis, a god-like hero of fishermen legends. Fishermen at sea sang songs about Divytis.
- Gardaitis, a god (a spirit?) of ships and sailors.
- Jagaubis, a household spirit of fire and the furnace.
- Rasa, Kupolė's and Kaupolis' daughter. She is the goddess of summer's greenage and flowers.
- Mokas, a stone with an ability to teach people, sometimes they are found in families - with wife Mokienė and children Mokiukas

== See also ==
- Proto-Indo-European mythology
- Indo-European cosmogony
- Latvian mythology
- Lithuanian mythology
- Prussian mythology
- Romuva (temple)
