= Roud Folk Song Index =

Database of English-language folksongs

The Roud Folk Song Index is a database of around 250,000 references to nearly 25,000 songs collected from oral tradition in the English language from all over the world. It is compiled by Steve Roud, who started the index in c. 1970. Roud's Index is a combination of the Broadside Index (printed sources before 1900) and a "field-recording index" compiled by Roud. It subsumes all the previous printed sources known to Francis James Child (the Child Ballads) and includes recordings from 1900 to 1975. Until early 2006, the index was available by a CD subscription; now it can be found online on the Vaughan Williams Memorial Library website, maintained by the English Folk Dance and Song Society (EFDSS). A partial list is also available at List of folk songs by Roud number.

== Purpose of index ==
The primary function of the Roud Folk Song Index is as a research aid correlating versions of traditional English-language folk song lyrics independently documented over past centuries by many different collectors across (especially) the UK and North America. It is possible by searching the database—for example by title, first line(s), or subject matter (or a combination of any of a dozen fields)—to locate many of the variants of a particular song. Comprehensive details of those songs are then available, including details of the original collected source, and a reference to where to find the text (and possibly music) of the song within a published volume in the EFDSS archive.

A related index, the Roud Broadside Index, includes references to songs which appeared on broadsides and other cheap print publications, up to about 1920. In addition, there are many entries for music hall songs, pre-World War II radio performers' song folios, sheet music, and other sources. The index may be searched by title, first line etc. and the result includes details of the original imprint and where a copy may be located. The Roud number field may be used as a cross-reference to the Roud Folk Song Index itself in order to establish the traditional origin of the work.

The database is recognised as a "significant index" by the EFDSS and was one of the first items to be published on its web site after the launch of the online version of the Vaughan Williams Memorial Library in 2006.

== Numbering scheme and cross references ==
The purpose of the index is to give each song a unique identifier. The numbers were assigned on a more or less arbitrary basis, and are not intended to carry any significance in themselves. However, because of the practicalities of compiling the index (building on previously published sources) it is true as a general rule that older and better-known songs tend to occupy low numbers, while songs which are obscure have higher numbers.

Closely related songs are grouped under the same Roud number.

If a trusted authority gives the name of a song but not the words, it is assigned Roud number 000.

The Index cross-references to the Child Ballad number, if one is available for the particular song in question. It also includes, where appropriate, the Laws number, a reference to a system of classification of folk songs, using one letter of the alphabet and up to two numeric digits, developed by George Malcolm Laws in the 1950s.

== History ==
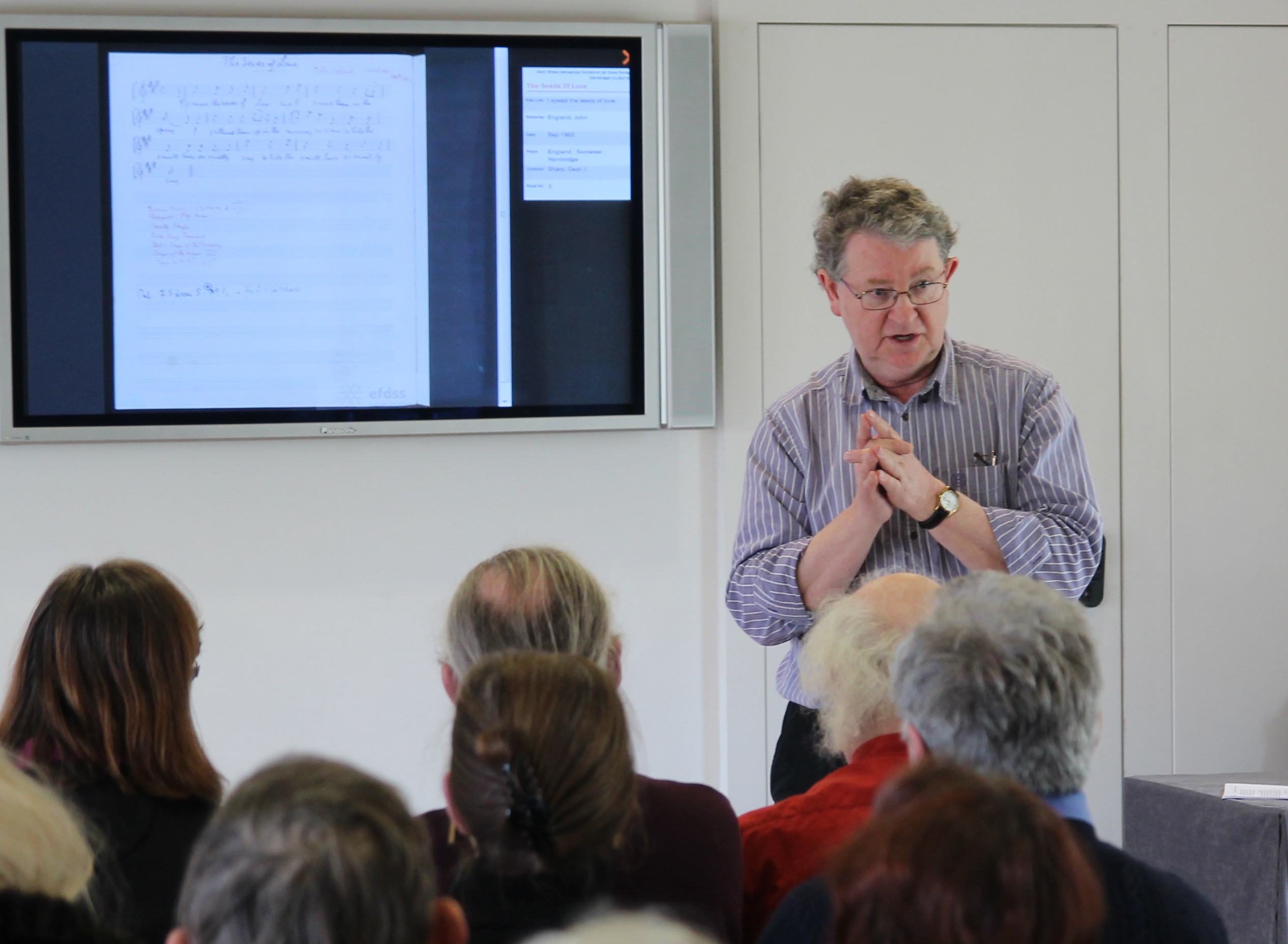
Steve Roud, creator of the Roud Folk Song Index, speaking about The Full English folk music website at Clare College, Cambridge in March 2014.

The index was compiled and is maintained by Steve Roud, formerly the local studies librarian in the London Borough of Croydon. He was also made honorary librarian of the Folklore Society.

He began the index around 1970 as a personal project, listing the source singer (if known), their locality, the date of noting the song, the publisher (book or recorded source), plus other fields, and assigning a number (now known as the "Roud number") to each song, with all variants of a song sharing the same number to overcome the problem of songs in which the titles are not consistent across versions. The system initially used 3x5-inch filing cards in shoeboxes. In 1993, Roud implemented his record system as a computer database, which he continues to expand and maintain and which is now hosted on the website of the Vaughan Williams Memorial Library.

The index is a major finding-aid both for enthusiasts and serious researchers.

== Similar collections ==
James Madison Carpenter's collection has 6,200 transcriptions and 1,000 recorded cylinders made between 1927 and 1955. The index gives the title, first line and the name of the source singer. When appropriate, the Child number is given.

The Cabinet of Folksongs (Dainu skapis) is a similar index of almost 218,000 Latvian folksong texts, created by Latvian scholar Krišjānis Barons at the end 19th century and beginning of the 20th century.

The Essen folk song database is another collection that includes songs from non-English-speaking countries, particularly Germany and China. It is a collaboration between groups at Stanford University and Ohio State University, stemming from a folksong collection made by Helmut Schaffrath and now incorporating Classical themes, themes from a number of Baroque composers, and Renaissance themes. It is proposed to include Indigenous American songs, as transcribed around the years 1900 to 1920 by Natalie Curtis.

The Folk Song Index is a collaborative project between the Oberlin College Library and the folk music journal Sing Out!. It indexes traditional folk songs of the world, with an emphasis on English-language songs, and contains over 62,000 entries and over 2,400 anthologies. Max Hunter's collection lists 1,600 songs, but each minor variant is given a distinct number.

The Traditional Ballad Index at the California State University at Fresno includes Roud numbers up to number 5,000 with comments on the songs, but draws on fewer sources. (For example, the Roud Folk Song Index shows 22 sources for "Hind Etin" (Roud 33, Child 41), while the Traditional Ballad Index list only one source.)

== See also ==
- List of folk songs by Roud number
- Iona and Peter Opie
- George Malcolm Laws
