= Mahte =

Term for "mother" in Latvian mythology

In Latvian mythology, the term Māte stands for "mother", sometimes written in English as Mahte. It was an epithet applied to some sixty-seventy goddesses. They were clearly distinct deities in most or all cases, so the term definitely referred to the mother-goddess of specific phenomena. According to professor Lotte Motz, scholar Haralds Biezais mentioned there were at least 70 characters in Baltic religion identified with the title of "māte".

== Overview ==
Latvian ethnographer Pēteris Šmits noted that the Mahtes seem to be a phenomenon exclusive to Latvian mythology, with no equivalent either in its Baltic neighbours (Prussian and Lithuanian), nor in other Indo-European mythologies.

Scholars (e.g., Miriam Robbins Dexter, Lotte Motz, David Adams Leeming, Martin Litchfield West) note that these deities were invoked with the epithet "māte" ('mother') and individually oversaw several aspects of nature, including features of the environment (forests, fields, mushrooms, sea, the wind, etc.), animals (for instance, elks), as well as cultural aspects, such as death and interrement, or milk and cattle.

According to scholar Elza Kokare, the authenticity of some Mahte deities is dubious, but some are firmly established due to a great number of mentions in the dainas (Latvian folksongs).

=== List of Mahte ===
Following are some of the māte characters:

1. Bangu māte - Mother of Waves
2. Ceļa māte - Mother of Roads
3. Dārza māte - Mother of Gardens
4. Dēkla māte
5. Gausu māte
6. Jūras māte - considered a goddess of the sea (from jūra – 'sea')
7. Kapu māte - 'Mother of Graves'
8. Kārta māte
9. Krūmu māte - Mother of Bushes
10. Lapu māte - Mother of Leaves
11. Lauka māte or Lauku māte - Mother of Fields
12. Lazdu māte - Mother of the Hazelbush
13. Lietus māte - Mother Rain
14. Linu māte - Mother Flax
15. Lopu māte - Mother of Livestock (Cattle)
16. Mieža māte - Mother of Barley
17. Meža māte - Mother of the Forest
18. Miglas māte - Mother of Fog
19. Pirts māte - Mother of the Bathhouse
20. Rijas māte - Mother of the Threshing Place
21. Sēņu māte - Mother of Mushrooms
22. Smilšu māte - Mother of Sands (Note: In Latvian folksongs there are references of a "hill of white sand" (Latv Baltâ smilkšu kalniņâ) or to "a sandhill" (Latv smiltaja) as the destination of the deceased in this world before they depart to "The Other Sun" (the afterlife).) (Note: In another daina, the deceased asks to be brought to the sand ("Vediet mani smiltainē") and that he will remain in his grave, by the white sand ("Es palikšu kapsētāi,/ Baltas smiltis rušināt").)
23. Sniega māte - Mother of Snow
24. Tirgus māte - Mother of Markets
25. Ūdens māte - Mother of Waters
26. Uguns mate - Mother of Fire
27. Upes māte - Mother of Rivers
28. Vēja māte - 'Mother of Winds'
29. Veļu māte or Vélių motę - mother of the souls/spirits
30. Zemes māte - Earth Mother (Māra)
31. Ziedu māte - Mother of Flowers

== Role of the Mothers ==
Scholarship on Baltic and Latvian folklore remarks that some of the Mahte characters comprise a complex of deities related to that phenomenon. It is also remarked that, out of this mother cult, "the main Latvian mother deities are those of the dead, the sea, the forest, and the wind".

=== Death and the afterlife ===
For instance, goddess Zemes māte ('earth mother') was associated with receiving the dead and acting as their ruler and guardian. In Latvian dainas, Zemes māte is associated with fellow Mahte ("Mothers") Veļu māte ('Mother of Dead Souls') and Kapu māte ('Mother of Graves'). According to researcher Elza Kokare, Zemes māte and Kapu māte act as the resting places of the dead, guarding its body and holding the key to their graves. As an individual character, Zemes māte is invoked as a person's final resting place. (Note: Best exemplified by mythologist Lotte Motz: "The chthonic goddess zemes mate (Mother Earth) receives the dead within her realm. In dainas addressed to her, she provides the eternal resting place: "Rock me mother, hold me mother! / Short is the time spent at your breast. / Mother Earth will hold me longer, / beneath her turf, a welcome guest." (J1209)". She also stated that "In Latvian society ... Mother Earth - zemes mate - is chiefly the resting place of the departed, ...") (Note: "In the next quatrain folksong it concerns about death, the sleeping (slumbering) in the grave. The Mother Earth is the goddess, from whom are coming all living beings and to whom after death they go back: (25) Ar Dieviņu, mâmulïte, / Labvakar, zemes mate!/ Labvakar, zemes mate, / Vai büs laba dusesanal [Good bye, Mother, / Good evening, Mother Earth! / Good evening, Mother Earth, / Shall I slumber well?]".) (Note: "Ar Dieviņu, tēvs, māmiņa,/ Labvakaru, Zemes māte (x2)/ Glabā manu augumiņu". [Farewell, father and mother, / Good evening, Earth mother (x2) / Take my body in your keeping].)

A second personage is named Veļu māte or Vélių motę (Mother of the souls/spirits of the deceased), etymologically connected to Lithuanian veles 'shades of the dead', velionis 'dead person' and Latvian Vels 'god of the underworld' (as mentioned by scholar Marija Gimbutas) and, by extension, with some relation to Slavic Veles, deity of the underworld. She is considered to be a chthonic goddess and "queen of the dead", who welcomes them at the cemetery.

Another figure named Nāves māte ("Mother Death") was presumed by scholar Nikolai Mikhailov to be connected to Slovenian word navje, an etymon related to the Nav of Slavic folklore, a designation for the dead. He also cited the possibility that Nāves māte is another name for Latvian Veļu māte and Lithuanian Veliona. The word nāve also means 'death' in Latvian.

Other deities connected with the worship of the dead were Kapu māte ('Mother of Graves', 'Mother of the Grave' or 'Graveyard-Mother') and Smilšu māte ('Mother of Sand' or 'Mother of the Sand Hillock').

=== The natural world ===
Another set of Mahte figures relate to the natural world, such as Vēju māte ("The Mother of Winds"); Meža māte ("Mother of the Forest"; counterpart to Lithuanian Medeina), protectress of wild life; Miglas māte ("Mother of the Fog") and Lietus māte ("Mother of Rain"). Vēju māte (or Vēja māte) is said to be the goddess of winds and ruler of the weather.

==== Bodies of water ====
Another group is composed of several water divinities: Jūras māte ("Mother Ocean", "Mother of the Seas" or "Sea-Mother"), a goddess of waters; Ūdens māte ("Mother of Waters"); Upes māte ("Mother of Rivers"), Bangu māte ("Mother of Waves"; counterpart to Lithuanian Bangputys). Jūras māte is said to rule the seas as a goddess.

Deity Bangu māte is considered to be a recent and more poetical appellation of the Mother of the Water and Mother of the Sea.

=== Household and home ===
Lithuanian scholar Marija Gimbutas pointed out that Latvian traditions contain a Uguns māte ('Mother of the Fire') as a counterpart to Lithuanian Gabija, a deity of the hearth and protectress of house and family. Other deities associated with the household and domestic affairs are Mãjas gars ("Spirits of the House") and Pirts māte ("Mother of the Bathhouse").

=== Agriculture ===
Mahte deities related to fields and agriculture include Lauka māte ("Mother of the Plough-Land"), a deity said to be worshipped at ploughing time.
