= Bangpūtys =

Baltic Sea God

Bangpūtys is the name of a masculine deity in Lithuanian mythology. Basing on very scanty sources, some mythologists have reconstructed him as a god of sea and storm. According to the reconstructions, he is austere and unrelenting. He has a beard, wings and two faces. He is commonly portrayed as having a fish in his left hand, a utensil in his right hand, and a rooster on the head.

His sons are the gods of wind: Rytys, Pietys, Šiaurys and Vakaris (easterly, southern, northern and westerly).

Bangpūtys is considered a very vindictive god, for example, one story talks of how Auštaras (son of Aušrinė and Mėnuo, the other god of easterly wind) was swimming in the sea and made a storm. Bangpūtys wanted to drown him.

Sometimes Bangpūtys is referred to as associating with Vėjopatis.

== See also ==
- Bangu māte (Latvia)
- Janus, a god with two faces in Roman mythology
- Anpao, another god with two faces in Lakota mythology
- Varuna, another god of the sea and storms in Hindu mythology
- List of Lithuanian gods and mythological figures
