= Gabija (given name) =

Lithuanian feminine given name

- Gender: female

Origin
- Origin: Lithuanian
- Meaning: Lithuanian goddess of fire and the hearth.
- Region of origin: Lithuania

Other names
- Related names: Gabieta, Gabeta

Gabija is a Lithuanian feminine given name.

Gabija (also known as Gabieta, Gabeta) is the goddess of fire and of the hearth of homes in Lithuanian mythology. It was the most popular given name for baby girls born in Lithuania in 2005.
