= Pinchuk =

Pinchuk (Belarusian: Пінчук, Russian: Пинчук is a Belarusian, Ukrainian & Jewish (Ashkenazic) toponymic surname literally meaning "native of Pinsk". Polish-language variant: Pinczuk. Notable people with the surname include:

- Anton Pinchuk, Kazakh heavyweight boxer, gold medalist in Boxing at the 2014 Asian Games – Men's 91 kg
- Dmitri Pinchuk (born 1984), Russian professional football player
- Mykola Pinchuk (born 1946), Soviet and Ukrainian football player
- Oleksiy Pinchuk (born 1992), Ukrainian football midfielder
- Olena Pinchuk (born 1970), daughter of Ukrainian president Leonid Kuchma, founder of ANTIAIDS Foundation, head of the StarLightMedia group supervisory board
- Sergei Pinchuk (born 1971), Russian naval officer
- Taras Pinchuk (born 1989), Ukrainian football defender
- Vasili Pinchuk (born 1994), Russian football player
- Victor Pinchuk (born 1960), Ukrainian businessman
- Vitaly Iustinovich Pinchuk, binomial authority of Pinchuk's goby (Ponticola cephalargoides), a fish in the Black and the Azov Sea

== See also ==
- Pinčiukas
