= Aušrinė (given name) =

- Gender: Female
- Language: Lithuanian
- Name day: 25 July August

Origin
- Origin: Aušrinė, the feminine deity of the Morning Star (Venus) in Lithuanian mythology.
- Region of origin: Lithuania

Aušrinė is a Lithuanian feminine given name. People bearing the name Aušrinė include:

- Aušrinė Armonaitė (born 1989), Lithuanian politician
- Aušrinė Norkienė (born 1975), Lithuanian politician
- Aušrinė Trebaitė (born 1988), Lithuanian racing cyclist
