= Åke V. Ström =

Swedish theologian

- Born: 28 February 1909; Karlskrona, Sweden
- Died: 20 August 1994 (aged 85); Kista, Sweden

Academic background
- Education: Stockholm University; Uppsala University

Academic work
- Discipline: Theology
- Sub-discipline: Old Norse studies
- Institutions: Lund University
- Main interests: Germanic religion

Åke Viktor Ored Ström (28 February 1909 – 20 August 1994) was a Swedish theologian who specialized in the study of Germanic religion.

== Biography ==
Åke V. Ström was born in Karlskrona, Sweden on 28 February 1909, the son of Tord Ström and Agnes Palm. He gained his fil kand from Stockholm University in 1930, and his teol kand from Uppsala University in 1935. Ström was ordained as a priest in 1936. He gained his teol dr from Uppsala University in 1945. Since 1965, Ström was a docent in religious history at Lund University. He was a highly regarded religious scholar, and a known authority on Old Norse religion. Ström died in Kista, Sweden on 20 August 1994.

== Selected works ==
- Germanische und Baltische Religion, 1975 (with Haralds Biezais).

== See also ==
- Anders Hultgård
- Dag Strömbäck
