= Krišjānis Barons Memorial Museum =

Museum in Riga, Latvia

- Krišjāņa Barona muzejs
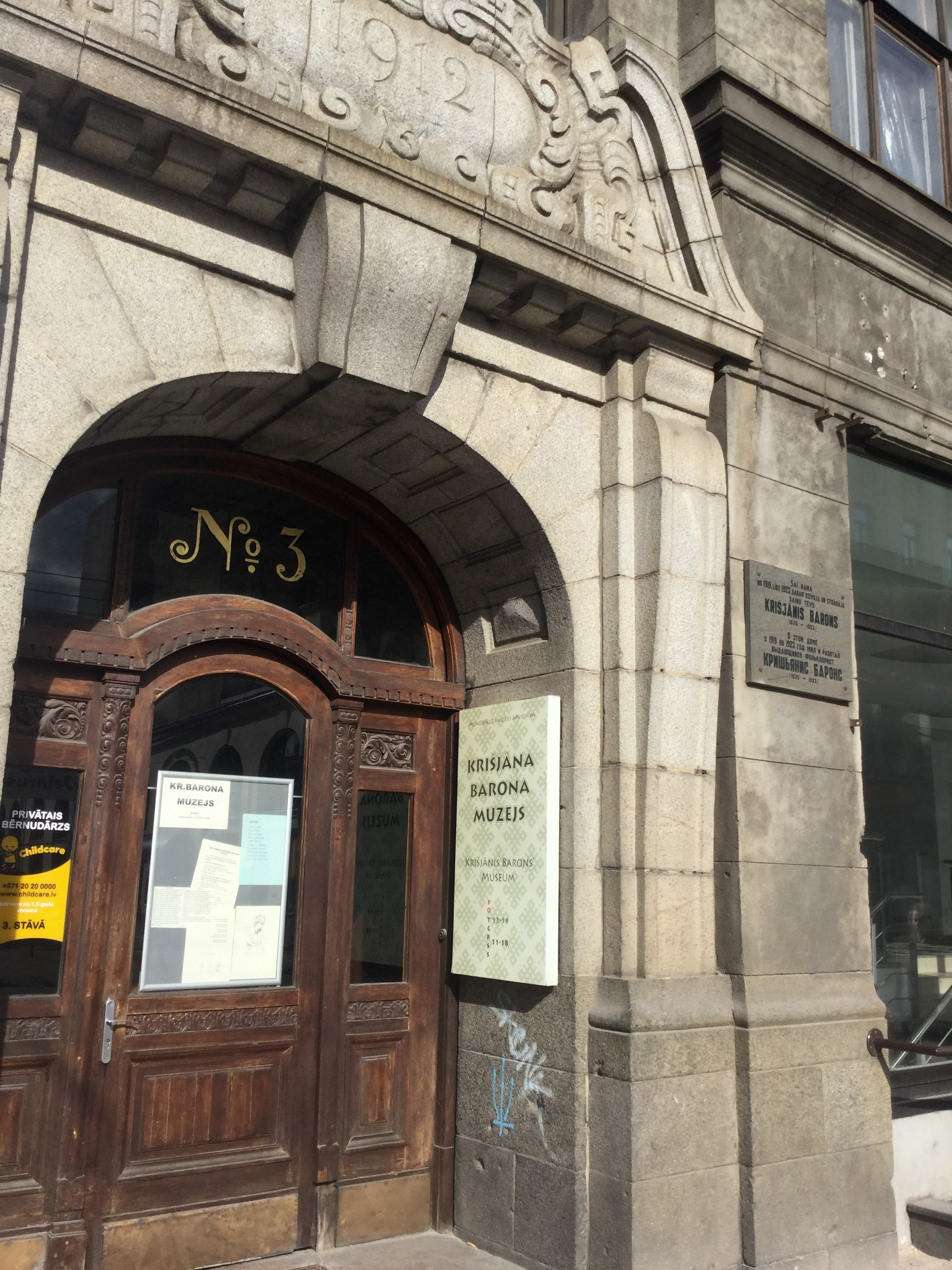
- Established: 1983
- Location: Latvia
- Coordinates: 56°57′05″N 24°07′16″E
- Area: 182 m^{2} (1,960 sq ft)
- Website: www.baronamuzejs.lv
- Location of Krišjānis Barons Memorial Museum

Krišjānis Barons Memorial Museum is a museum in Riga, Latvia. The museum is dedicated to the folklorist Krišjānis Barons and was established on October 31, 1985.
