= Dalia (mythology) =

Lithuanian goddess

Dalia is the goddess of fate in the Lithuanian mythology. She is the giver and taker of goods and property. Dalia is often confused with and hard to distinguish from Laima, another goddess of fate. Sometimes Dalia is thought of as a different manifestation of Laima. However, Laima is more involved in predicting the length of a person's life while Dalia is more concerned with material wealth a person would earn during the lifetime—allotting a proper share (Lithuanian: dalis) to everyone. According to myths, just as a father divides his estate among the children, so Dievas Senelis (manifestation of supreme god Dievas) allots each newborn with a proper share. Dalia is seen more as an enforcer of Dievas' will rather than a decision-maker. She can appear as a woman, lamb, dog, swan, or duck.

== See also ==
- List of Lithuanian gods and mythological figures
