= Jūratė =

Jūratė is a Lithuanian female given name.

People named Jūratė include:

- Jūratė Kiaupienė (born 1947), Lithuanian historian
- Jūratė Ladavičiūtė (born 1985), Lithuanian freestyle swimmer
- Jūratė Trimakaitė (born 1987), Lithuanian puppet director
- Jūratė Narvidaite, Lithuanian rower
- Jūratė Ščerbinskaitė, Lithuanian swimmer

== See also ==
- Jūratė and Kastytis, one of the most famous and popular Lithuanian legends and tales.
