= Gabija =

Spirit of the fire in Lithuanian mythology

Gabija (also known as Gabieta, Gabeta) is the spirit of the fire in Lithuanian mythology. She is the protector of home and family. Her name is derived from gaubti (to cover, to protect). Gabija is only mentioned in a list of Lithuanian gods by the Christian theologian Jan Łasicki in his treatise on idolatry (published in 1615). She is found in Lithuanian folklore.

Gabija could take zoomorphic forms of a cat, stork or rooster, or she could appear as a woman clothed in red. Gabija was greatly respected and cared for like a living creature. People would feed Gabija by offering bread and salt. Fire had to be laid to bed – women would cover the charcoal with ashes every evening so that fire would not wander around. Just as Gabija was the protector of the house, the mother of the household was the protector of fire. Sometimes, a bowl of clean water would be left near the hearth so that Gabija could wash herself. Household fires were attributed to an angered or mistreated Gabija, whose flames would spread and "go for a walk" until she was satiated. Much folklore describes the ill fate of those who offended Gabija by stomping, spitting, or urinating on her.

Mama Gabija is the Lithuanian goddess of the home, hearth, and patron of their care. She most likely originates from Gabija.

In modern discussions of Lithuanian folklore, Gabija and Praurimė are often discussed as one and the same, with debates surrounding the authenticity of each deity and their respective domains. In particular, consensus on whether traditional Lithuanian fire priestesses (Lithuanian: vaidilutės) primarily served Gabija or Praurimė is mixed.

In microbiology the name Gabija, shortened to Gaj, has been attributed to a genome.

== See also ==
- List of Lithuanian gods and mythological figures
- Nëna e Vatrës – a similar figure in Albanian mythology and folklore
