= Cabinet of Folksongs =

Latvian folksongs collection collected by Krišjānis Barons

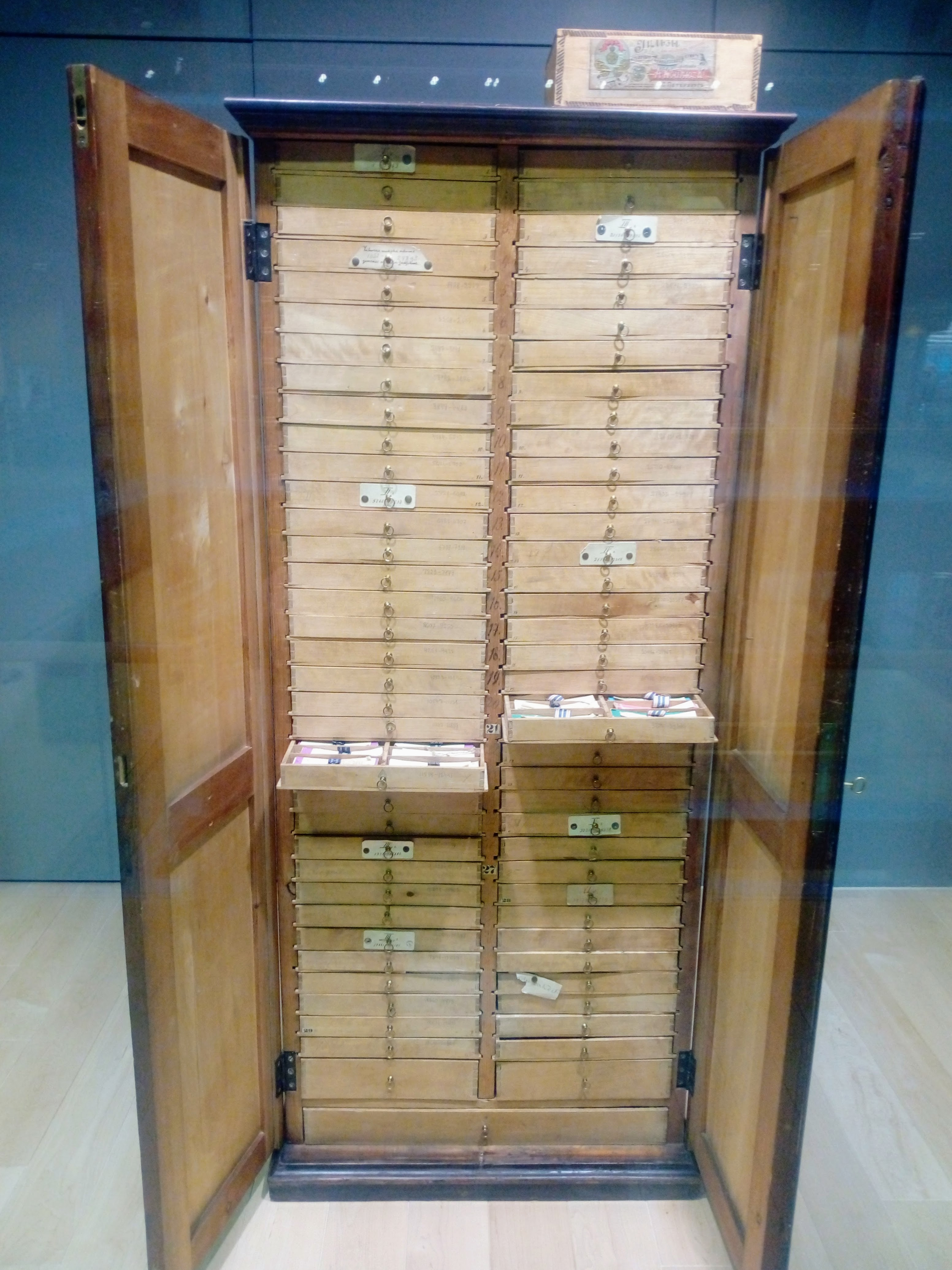
- The original Cabinet of Folksongs in the National Library of Latvia
- Designer: Krišjānis Barons
- Date: 1880
- Made in: Moscow
- Height: 160 cm (63 in)
- Width: 66 cm (26 in)
- Depth: 42 cm (17 in)

Cabinet of Folksongs or Cabinet of Dainas (Latvian: Dainu skapis) is a cabinet 160 cm (63 in) tall, 66 cm (26 in) wide, and 42 cm (17 in) deep, in which all Latvian folksongs (dainas) collected by Latvian folklorist Krišjānis Barons are stored. The cabinet itself was made in Moscow in 1880 after Barons' draft. In 2001, the Cabinet of Folksongs was included in the UNESCO Memory of the World Register.

The cabinet contains documents that preserve traditions and other details about pre-Christian Latvian tribes.

== History ==
Barons started acquiring folksongs in 1868 (or 1878) with the purpose of demonstrating "that Latvian culture in its oldest part is of equal value as the culture of other nations". The cabinet was built in Moscow in 1880 and was based on Barons' draft. Due to the number of folksongs that were sent to Barons, the cabinet was deemed necessary. Prior to the completion of the cabinet, the folksongs were stored in cigarette-paper boxes. When the amount of texts approached 150,000 in 1893, Barons and his work returned to Latvia from Moscow.

After the author's death, the cabinet was kept in a bank vault. It was moved to the Archives of Latvian Folklore in 1940, to the Literature, Folklore, and Art Institute of The Latvian Academy of Sciences in 1945, to the Literature, Folklore, and Art Institute of the University of Latvia in 1999, and to the new building of the National Library of Latvia in 2014. Before the relocation to the National Library and its being placed on public display, the Cabinet of Folksongs was insured for one million euros.

The Cabinet of Folksongs had a copy in the Krišjānis Barons Memorial Museum and another one within the Stankevich manor in Russia, where Barons started working with dainas. In 1998, the contents of the Cabinet began to be digitised and its contents are completely available online since 2006.

In 2001, the Cabinet of Folksongs was added by UNESCO to the Memory of the World international register.

== Description ==
The cabinet has 73 drawers of differing sizes that are filled with papers measuring 3 cm × 11 cm (1.2 in × 4.3 in). The cabinet's three large drawers at the bottom store archive materials. The Cabinet of Folksongs houses 268,815 pages with 2-line to 4-line folksongs, as well as other texts such as riddles, adages, "traditions, customs, game descriptions, [and] magic spells".
