= Aušrinė =

Goddess of the morning-star, Venus

- Morning-Star
- Planet: Venus
- Region: Lithuania

Equivalents
- Greek: Eos
- Roman: Aurora
- Latvian: Auseklis
- Vedic: Ushas

Aušrinė ("dawning", not to be confused with Aušra, "dawn") is a feminine deity of the morning star (Venus) in Lithuanian mythology. She is the antipode to "Vakarinė", the evening star.

Her cult possibly stems from that of the Indo-European dawn goddess Hausōs and is related to the Latvian Auseklis, Greek Eos, Roman Aurora, and Vedic Ushas. Aušrinė is the goddess of beauty, love, and youth, linked with health, re-birth, and new beginnings. After the Christianization of Lithuania, the cult merged with Christian images and the symbolism of the Virgin Mary.

== Historical attestation ==
Aušrinė was first mentioned by 16th-century Polish historian Jan Łasicki as Ausca. He described a "goddess of the rays of the sun that descend and rise above the horizon".

== Folkloric role ==
According to folklore, each morning, Aušrinė and her servant Tarnaitis (possibly Mercury) prepare the way for Saulė (the Sun). In the evening, Vakarinė prepares the bed for Saulė. The relationship between Saulė and Aušrinė is complex. Sometimes, Saulė is described as the mother of Aušrinė, Vakarinė, and other planets – Indraja (Jupiter), Sėlija (Saturn), Žiezdrė (Mars), Vaivora (Mercury), and even Žemyna (Earth).

In some stories, "Karaliūnė" and "Dangaus Kariūnė" ("Queen of Heaven") are used to refer to Aušrinė.

In Latvian folk-riddles, her name is the answer to a riddle about dew. In this riddle, a girl loses her keys (or spreads her pearl necklace), the Moon sees them, but the Sun takes them.

=== Myth of the "celestial wedding" ===
A popular myth describes how Mėnulis (Moon) fell in love with beautiful Aušrinė, cheated on his wife Saulė, and received punishment from Perkūnas (thunder-god). Different myths also depict rivalry between Saulė and Aušrinė, as Saulė is jealous of Aušrinė's beauty and brightness (Venus is the third-brightest object in the sky after Sun and Moon). Despite the adultery or rivalry, Aušrinė remains loyal and continues to serve Saulė in the mornings.

=== Other roles ===
Another myth, Saulė Ir Vėjų Motina ("The Sun and the Mother of Winds"), analyzed by Algirdas Julien Greimas in detail, tells a story of Joseph, who becomes fascinated with Aušrinė appearing in the sky and goes on a quest to find the "second sun". After much adventure, he learns that it was not the second sun, but a maiden who lives on an island in the sea and has the same hair as the Sun. With advice from the Northern Wind, Joseph reaches the island, avoids a guardian bull, and becomes the maiden's servant, caring for her cattle. In the tale, Aušrinė appeared in three forms: as a star in the sky, as a maiden on land, and as a mare in the sea. After a few years, Joseph puts a single hair of the maiden into an empty nutshell and throws it into the sea. A ray from the sea becomes reflected into the sky as the biggest star. Greimas concludes that this tale is a double origin myth: the story describes the origin of Tarnaitis and the ascent of Aušrinė herself into the sky.

== In popular culture ==
According to Jonas Vaiškūnas, Aušrinė also gives its name to the morning star in Lithuanian folkly astronomy: Aušrinė žvaigždė, Aušros žvaigždė, Aušràžvaigždė, Aušrinukė.

== See also ==
- Aušrinė (given name), Lithuanian feminine given name.
- Hausos in reconstructed Proto-Indo-European religion.
- Zorya in Slavic mythology.
- List of Lithuanian gods and mythological figures
