= Daina (Latvia) =

Traditional form of music from Latvia

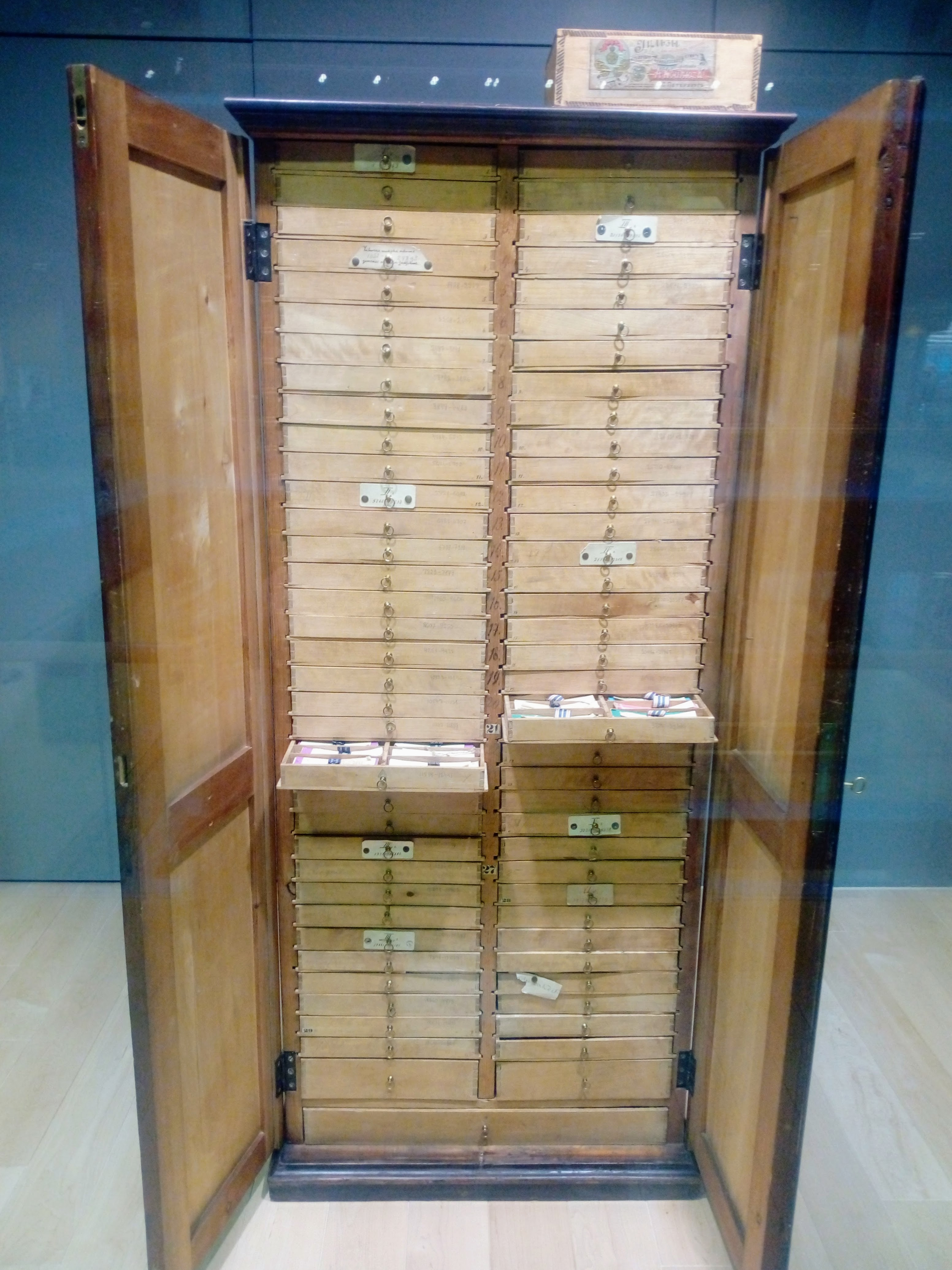
The Cabinet of Folksongs, a collection of almost 218,000 Latvian folksong texts at the National Library of Latvia

A daina or tautas dziesma is a traditional form of music or poetry from Latvia. Lithuanian dainos share common traits with them, but have been more influenced by European folk song traditions. Latvian dainas often feature drone vocal styles and pre-Christian themes and legends, and can be accompanied by musical instruments such as Baltic psalteries (e.g. kokles). Dainas tend to be very short (usually four-liners) and are usually in a trochaic or a dactylic metre. Dainas are being translated into English by Latvian American Ieva Auziņa-Szentivanyi.

== Poetic metre and its limitations ==
The trochaic metre is the most popular, with around 95% of dainas being in it. Characteristic of this metre is that an unstressed syllable follows a stressed syllable, with two syllables forming one foot. Two feet form a dipody and after every dipody, there is a caesura, which cannot be in the middle of a word. The dainas traditionally are written down so that every line contains two dipodies. If a caesura is followed by three syllables, the last syllable – i.e. the one at the end of the line – is long; if four syllables follow it is short. A syllable is considered short if it contains a short vowel or a short vowel and S; all other syllables are considered long. This results in a rather limited vocabulary as a dipody can consist of either one four-syllable word, two two-syllable words, one one-syllable and one three-syllable word or two one-syllable words and one two-syllable word. Exceptions are mostly found in Eastern Latvian dialects, which allow words to start one syllable before or after where the caesura normally would be, thus allowing five-syllable combinations. This inconsistency is usually found only in one or two lines, most often in the second or fourth. The notion of short and long syllables at the end of lines is retained. However, the syllable after a lost caesura is often unstressed as it is in everyday speech.

A sound may be added or removed to increase vocabulary there or elsewhere. The addition of sounds is explained with structural changes in the language itself (loss of vowels in word endings). The sound added at the end of a word is usually I, in some rare cases also A, U or E (the last of these mostly in some regions of Courland). Occasionally contractions occur and I replaces a diminutive ending in I – i.e. the ending is retained but separated from the rest of the word by a caesura. This can perhaps be explained by diminutives being so popular in dainas that people didn't find it appropriate to replace one with the same word without it, which would be a syllable shorter. Sometimes a diminutive is added to increase the number of syllables even when the meaning of the word is the opposite of what is usually expressed with the diminutive. Similarly, the need to match the metric might cause disagreement in tenses.

== Stylistic devices ==
Dainas feature several stylistic devices to ensure euphony. Common devices use repetition; these include alliteration (repetition of similar consonants in stressed syllables), anaphora and epiphora (the use of the same words at the beginning and end of lines, the repetition of a word, a combination of words or previous line, or starting a new sentence with a word that has the same root as the last word of the previous sentence). Comparisons and other symbolic devices are also found in their range, including straightforward comparisons, epithets, metaphors, synecdoches, allegories, personifications and parallelisms where seemingly unrelated concepts are used to liken events from nature to human life and different social classes.

== Themes ==
Lyrically, dainas concern themselves with native mythology and traditional festivals but, in contrast to most similar forms, do not have any legendary heroes. Stories often revolve around pre-Christian deities like the sun goddess Saule and the moon god Mēness. There are dainas that do not have a mythical theme as well – many simply describe the daily life of agrarian society and nature. However, these still often include personifications of natural phenomena. Another major theme is the human life cycle, especially the three major events: birth, wedding, and death (including burial). The dainas concerning birth are deeply emotional, and usually feature a mother figure not only as the person who gives birth but also as the one who determines the fate of the child. These also often feature the fate deity Laima and were historically sung immediately after birth, which traditionally took place in a bathhouse. Many dainas are set apart from others by erotic and sexual themes and mockery. These are commonly known as nerātnās (naughty) dainas. The dainas devoted to death describe an individual preparing for death and often relate to funeral customs. These often feature a female god related to the world of the dead, variously known as kapu māte, veļu māte, zemes māte or smilšu māte (mother of graves, mother of dead, mother Earth, mother of sand). The first collection of dainas was published between 1894 and 1915 as Latvju Dainas by Krišjānis Barons. There are well over two hundred thousand collected dainas in written form.

== See also ==
- The Cabinet of Folksongs
- Daina (Lithuania)
- Latvian mythology
- Celestial wedding in Baltic folklore
