= Haralds Biezais =

Latvian theologian and religious scholar

- Born: 10 July 1909
- Died: 18 May 1995 (aged 85)
- Citizenship: Latvian
- Occupations: Theologian, religious scholar

Academic background
- Education: University of Latvia (1939), Uppsala University (1955)

Academic work
- Discipline: Religious studies
- Sub-discipline: Latvian paganism, comparative religions
- Notable works: Die Hauptgöttinnen der alten Letten (1955); Die Gottesgestalt der lettischen Volksreligion (1961); Die himmlische Götterfamilie der alten Letten (1972); Germanische und baltische Religion (1975); Lichtgott der alten Letten (1976)

Haralds Biezais (10 July 1909 – 18 May 1995) was a Latvian theologian and religious scholar. He also served as an ordained minister of the Latvian Protestant Church throughout his adult life. Biezais lived in exile in Sweden from the start of the second Soviet occupation of Latvia in 1944 until his death in 1995. His studies on Latvian mythology are considered standard works in the field.

== Biography ==
Haralds Fritz Theodor Biezais was born on 10 July 1909 in Lestene, Latvia (then part of the Russian Empire), into a poor evangelical peasant family. In the context of a growing contestation of the Baltic German-dominated church, the family attended religious services only irregularly and was critical of the German clergy (according to Biezais' own estimates, 90 percent of all pastors, including those in Latvian parishes, were German by 1919).

After graduating from the gymnasium in Tukums, Biezais studied in 1927 at the Faculty of Natural Sciences of the University of Latvia in Riga, then enrolled in the Faculty of Theology in 1928–29 to study Protestant theology. In his last year of study in Riga in 1932, Biezais took up a pastorate in Gramzda, a village on the Latvian-Lithuanian border. During the academic years 1934–35 and 1936–37, he pursued postgraduate studies in Zürich (where he was a student of Carl Jung) and Strasbourg at his own expense. In 1939, he earned a doctorate in theology with a dissertation on the "synthesis of Life and Love in Christian humanity". During the Soviet occupation of Latvia in 1940–1941, Biezais was dismissed from his post at the University of Latvia, then the church of Gramzda was burned down shortly after the Nazi invasion at the end of June 1941. However, Biezais arranged for it to be rebuilt in a few months (with the use of Jewish workers as approved by the occupying power).

In September 1941, Biezais began working at the Central Church Archives, of which he became director the following year. His work consisted mainly in preparing Aryan certificates for Baltic Germans enrolled in the Wehrmacht. Between 1941 and 1942, he also wrote numerous articles on religious studies. During the academic year 1943–44, he gave a two-semester lecture course on the "History of philosophy and ethics" at the University of Riga. In the aftermath of the second Soviet invasion of Latvia, Biezais fled to Sweden on 13 October 1944. Along with ten other Latvian emigrant pastors, he helped establish a temporary administration of the Latvian church in the country, and did pastoral work in a camp of Latvian refugees in Stockholm.

From 1945 to 1980, Biezais taught at Uppsala University, where he obtained a PhD in 1955 with a dissertation on the "main goddesses of the Ancient Latvians", and was appointed professor in 1961. In 1971–1972, he served as a professor in the history of religions at the Swedish-speaking University of Åbo (Finland), then taught at the University of Bonn in 1975–1976. His main studies on Latvian mythology, including Die Hauptgöttinnen der alten Letten (1955), Die Gottesgestalt der lettischen Volksreligion (1961), Die himmlische Götterfamilie der alten Letten (1972), Germanische und baltische Religion (1975), and Lichtgott der alten Letten (1976), were published during this period.

Biezais died on 18 May 1995 in Stockholm. He never returned to Latvia after 1944, although he would have had the opportunity to do so following the Fall of the Iron Curtain in 1991. His memoirs, written in Latvian and published in 1983, were primarily addressed to the Latvian community in exile. The second part, which was to deal with his life in Sweden, has not yet been published as of 2007.

== Political views ==
According to scholar Iveta Leitāne, "Biezais emphatically distanced himself from politics. His only political goal was to stand up for the independence of the Latvian church, which led to conflicts with the church authorities in the 1930s. However, Biezais never questioned either National Socialism or Latvian nationalism and authoritarianism. He even accepted Latvian nationalism completely. Biezais had an ambivalent relationship to Jews and Judaism, which was initially characterised by an economic anti-Semitism. Later on, he felt confirmed in his views by Christian anti-Semitism (...) However, Biezais can certainly not be counted among the friends and allies of National Socialism. With regard to the role of the Latvian legionnaires who had been called up to the Wehrmacht in the Second World War and fought alongside it, he took an intermediate position. He did not want to elevate them to the status of freedom fighters of the Latvian people or defame them as mere partisans of the Nazis. His assessment was based on the fundamental assumption that under the pressure of the occupying power, the intentions and goals of those affected by it were irrelevant."

== Selected works ==
- Kristiānisms, nacionālisms, humānisms, 1953.
- Die Hauptgöttinen der alten Letten, 1955.
- Die Gottesgestalt der lettischen Volksreligion, 1961.
- Die himmlische Göterfamilie der alten Letten, 1972.
- Germanische und baltische Religion, 1975 (with Åke V. Ström).
- Lichtgott der alten Letten, 1976.
- Religious symbols and their functions, 1979.
