= Laima =

Baltic goddess of fate

- Goddess of Fate
- Animals: Cuckoo
- Tree: Linden

Genealogy
- Siblings: Kārta and Dēkla

Laima is a Baltic goddess of fate. She was associated with childbirth, marriage, and death; she was also the patron of pregnant women.

== In Latvia ==
In Latvian mythology, Laima and her sisters, Kārta and Dēkla, were a trinity of fate deities, similar to the Norse Norns or the Greek Moirai. Laima makes the final decision on individual's fate and is considerably more popular. While all three of them had similar functions, Dēkla is in charge of children, Kārta holds control over the adult's life, and Laima is more associated with mothers. In modern Dievturi these three goddesses are referred to as the three Laimas, indicating they are the same deity in three different aspects. Birth rituals at the end of the 19th century included offerings of hen, sheep, towels or other woven materials to Laima. Only women could participate in the ritual, performed in a sauna (pirtis).

== In Lithuania ==
In Lithuanian mythology, Laima (fate, destiny) is often confused with Laimė (good fortune) and Laumė (fairy). Other related deities include Dalia (fate) and Giltinė (The Reaper). Laima was first mentioned in written sources as Laimelea by Wilhelm Martini in the Latin prologue to Lithuanian songs, collected by Daniel Klein and published in 1666. She was also mentioned by Matthäus Prätorius, Jacob Brodowski, Philipp Ruhig and others.

One of the most important duties of Laima is to prophesy (Lithuanian: lemti) how the life of a newborn will take place. Sometimes there was only one Laima, while in other cases three Laimas would give often contradictory predictions. The final pronouncement would be irrevocable and not even Laima herself could change it. While three fate goddesses have less support among academics, the concept is well-established in European religions (e.g. Greek Moirai). In the earlier historiography, the example of predestination by Laima was used to judge the Lithuanian religion as fatalistic. For example, in 1837 Manfred Tietz wrote that, because Lithuanians believed in the determined fate, they were fearless warriors. Algirdas Julien Greimas argued that such a view is superficial and that Laima did not determine the fate but only knew about it. In one Lithuanian version of the Great Flood myth, Laima participates in the birth of the humankind.

Laima was related to Gegutė (cuckoo), which Greimas considered a separate goddess while others see her as an incarnation of Laima. Gegutė was responsible for time and the succession of the seasons. The number of her calls was believed to predict how long a person had left to live. In spring she would also determine how a person would spend the remainder of the year; for example, if a man had no money on him when he heard the cuckoo, he would be poor for the rest of the year. Laima's sacred tree is the linden.

== In modern culture ==
The Lithuanian folk music group Kūlgrinda released an album in 2014 titled Laimos Giesmės, meaning "The Hymns of Laima".

== See also ==
- List of Lithuanian gods and mythological figures
