= Jan Łasicki =

Polish historian and theologian

Jan Łasicki (Latin: Johannis Lasitii or Lasicius; 1534–1602) was a Polish historian and theologian. He was well-educated and traveled extensively in Western Europe from 1556 to 1581. Around 1557 he converted to Calvinism, becoming a follower of the Unity of the brethren in 1567.

His major work is eight-volume Historia de origine et rebus gestis fratrum Bohemicorum. The Only one volume survives which deals with customs and organizations of the brethren and was first published in 1660. His other works include Historia de ingressu Polonorum in Valachiam cum Bogdano (1584) about the Polish invasion of Wallachia. The work was translated into Polish by Władysław Syrokomla in 1855. His 18-page Concerning the gods of Samagitians, and other Sarmatians and false Christians (De diis Samagitarum caeterorumque Sarmatarum et falsorum Christianorum, written c. 1582 and published in 1615) provides a list of Lithuanian gods and is an important resource in the study of the Lithuanian mythology.
