= Krišjānis Barons =

Latvian writer and folklorist (1835-1923)

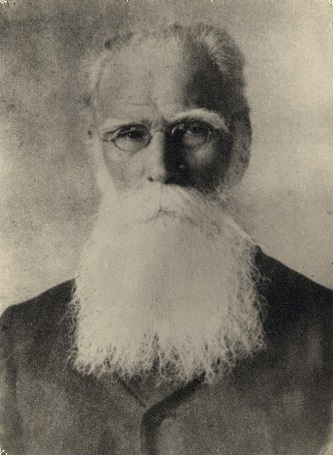
- Krišjānis Barons in 1910
- Born: October 31, 1835; Jaunpils Parish, Russian Empire
- Died: March 8, 1923 (aged 87); Rīga, Latvia
- Occupations: Writer folklorist linguist
- Spouse: Dārta Barona
- Writing career
- Movement: Young Latvians

Krišjānis Barons (October 31, 1835 – March 8, 1923) was a Latvian writer who is known as the "father of the dainas" (Latvian: "Dainu Tēvs"), largely thanks to his systematization of the Latvian folk songs, and his labour in preparing their texts for publication in Latvju dainas. His portrait appeared on the 100-lat banknote prior to the Lat being replaced by the Euro in 2014, his being the only human face of an actual person on modern Latvian currency. Barons was very prominent among the Young Latvians, and was also an important writer and editor.

== Latvju dainas ==
=== Background and importance ===
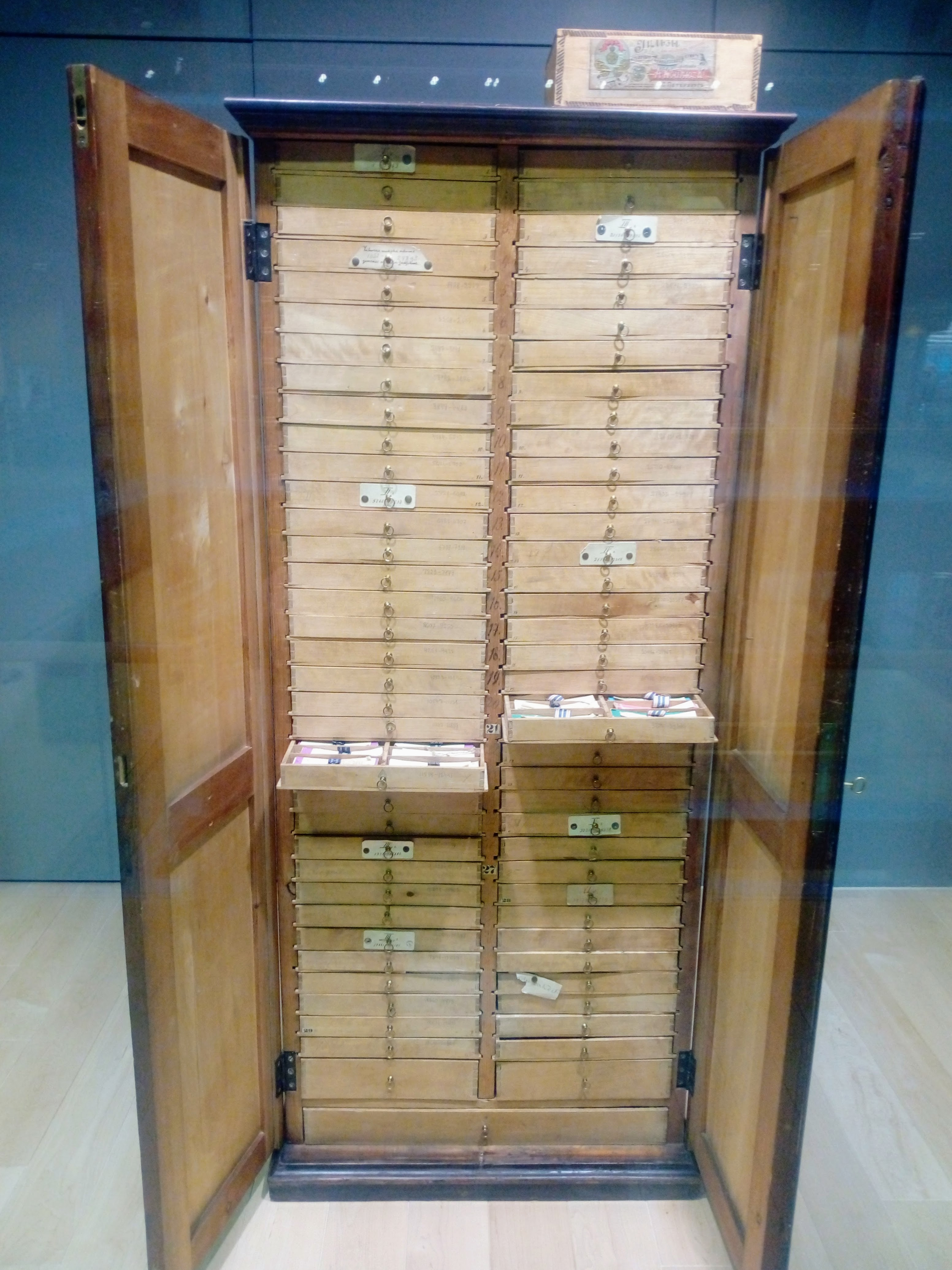
The original Cabinet of Folksongs at the National Library of Latvia

Barons is well known as the creator of Latvju dainas, published between 1894 and 1915 in six volumes, and includes 217,996 folk songs.Barons though, was not the author of the original idea, neither did he collect the texts, nor rewrite all the received texts on the tiny paper slips of the famous Cabinet of Folksongs (Dainu skapis), though there is a significant number of the slips displaying Barons' own handwriting, as some may believe. Still, his contributions are of no less importance. He elaborated the classification system of Latvju dainas, arranging the texts and introducing the notion of song types or bushes (choosing a text as the main one among a number of similar ones, and grouping the surrounding rest – this allows for easier perception of variation, and saves space in the published edition, as the only differences are indicated in print). Barons had also edited some texts in order to restore their possible older and better form. In recognition of Barons' labors and the historical value of the Cabinet of Folksongs, the work was inscribed on UNESCO's Memory of the World Register in 2001.

At the time when Barons was working on the edition, the traditional singing had been lost to a great extent; Barons in his introduction to Latvju dainas mentions that "the sources of nation's memory, as it seemed, filled up and having run dry long ago, started to flow amazingly." He also warns that "the old ladies, our purest source of folk songs, become rarer and rarer with each day". Barons also points at the Latvians themselves turning away from the singing of traditional songs when accepting Christianity, for example.

=== Publication ===
On the title page of Latvju dainas, Krišjānis Barons is not the only publisher that was indicated. Besides his name, Henrijs Visendorfs' name was also mentioned (1861–1916). Barons, in the same introduction to Latvju dainas, wrote: "Then in the month of January 1892 I was surprised by a kind letter from St. Petersburg, from Mr. Wissendorff, in which he offered his support for the publication of the edition. We soon achieved our agreement on this." Visendorfs was a well-to-do Latvian merchant, with his own office at the famous St. Petersburg Gostinnij Dvor. He had gotten interested in Latvian culture before, supporting researchers and editions, and writing about Latvian mythology himself (although these writings were not met with enthusiasm by the academic scholars). Visendorfs later provided Barons with copies of collections from the Jelgava Latvian Society Department of Literature.

By the time of the publication of Volume 1 of Latvju dainas, he had submitted to Barons 12,800 song texts, acquired "with the help of local collectors"; altogether, his collection contains 28,406 texts. It is highly likely that based on the popular idea of the time, that of the Latvian-Lithuanian great nation, he suggested to Barons the word "daina", which is actually Lithuanian, and which became the title of the edition. The first volume was published in Jelgava, funded by Visendorfs himself. But it turned out to be rather costly, and Visendorfs, using his connections, organised the publication of the other volumes with the help of the Imperial Academy of Sciences. In 1900, it was officially settled, and from 1903 until 1915, the other volumes were published. These volumes, in addition to the previous two title pages in different languages (Latvian and French), received one more in Russian translation. Although Visendorfs took no part in editing and arranging the texts, his contribution performing organisational tasks, reading the preprints of the volumes published in St. Petersburg, and providing his advice was significant enough to earn a place for his name on the title page, although Prof. Pēteris Šmits objected to it.

In 1893, Krišjānis Barons returned to Latvia with his Cabinet of Folksongs, at that time containing around 150,000 texts. The index to Latvju dainas shows more than 900 contributors; among them 237 male informants and 137 female informants, while of collectors only 54 are laies, and at least 150 were school teachers, 50 were men of letters, and 20 were priests.

Barons, without exact account, indicates the total number of texts used to be 217 996; this number is usually quoted as that of the songs published. Still, as Latvju dainas was created based on collection by local people, it does not comprehensively cover the whole territory of Latvia. 218 Latvian civil parishes were not represented, not even with a single text. To collect from the mute parishes, 30 years after the publication of Latvju dainas was started, Latviesu folkloras krātuve began its activities.

Whatever the other editions there are and will be in the future, Latvju dainas has become the most quoted and referred to, as testified by two repeated editions – in 1922–1923 and 1989–1994.

== Legacy ==
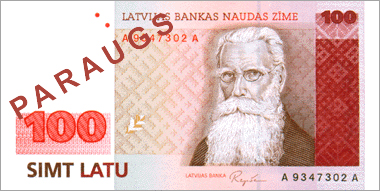
Barons on a 100-lat banknote

Barons efforts to collect folklore and dainas were vital for the emergence of Dievturība, a Baltic neopagan movement established by Ernests Brastiņš and Kārlis Marovskis-Bregžis in the 1920s.

A minor planet, 3233 Krišbarons, discovered by Soviet astronomer Nikolai Stepanovich Chernykh in 1977, is named after him. One of the main streets in Riga, Krišjāna Barona iela, is named after him.

His descendants are currently residing in the United States, primarily located in a small town in western Pennsylvania called Grove City.

In the interwar Latvia, the Krišjānis Barons prize was established in his honor (1926–1940).

== Sources ==
- Latvju Dainas
