= Mikalojus Akelaitis =

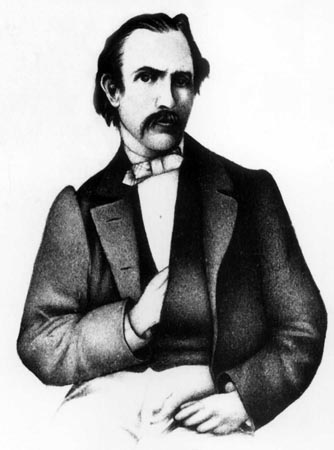
- Born: 5 December 1829; Čiuoderiškės, Suwałki Governorate, Congress Poland, Russian Empire
- Died: 27 September 1887 (aged 57); Paris, France
- Resting place: Cimetière parisien de Pantin
- Other names: Mikołaj Akielewicz (Polish), Juras Varnelis (pen-name)
- Known for: Cultural figure, activist, author, poet, linguist, publicist
- Movement: Lithuanian National Revival
- Board member of: Želmuo Society

Mikalojus Akelaitis (Polish: Mikołaj Akielewicz, also known by pen-name Juras Varnelis; 1829–1887) was a Lithuanian writer, publicist and amateur linguist, one of the early figures of the Lithuanian National Revival and participant in the Uprising of 1863.

Akelaitis completed only a four-year secondary school and worked as a tutor for nobility's children at various manors in present-day Poland and Lithuania. He learned several languages and started contributing articles to the Polish press. He wrote works on the Lithuanian language, literature, folklore, mythology, history. His favorite research subject was linguistics, but as many self-taught linguists he developed unscientific etymologies and theories. Many of his works remained unfinished or unpublished. He generally supported the resurrection of the former Polish–Lithuanian Commonwealth and the Polish-Lithuanian identity. He wrote texts that were meant for the common folk in Lithuanian, but his articles and studies for the intelligentsia were written in Polish as it was considered the language of culture at the time. He collaborated with Simonas Daukantas and Motiejus Valančius on plans to establish the first Lithuanian-language periodical Pakeleivingas, but failed to secure government's permits. With financial aid of several nobles, he published five Lithuanian-language booklets in 1860 at the press of Adam Honory Kirkor. Akelaitis joined the anti-Tsarist resistance leading to the Uprising of 1863 – he organized an anti-government demonstration and wrote anti-government texts. He fled the Russian police to Paris where he worked at the Polish Library in Paris. At the outbreak of the uprising, he returned to Lithuania becoming an assistant commissioner of the Polish National Government in Augustów. When it became clear that the uprising would not succeed, Akelaitis fled to Paris for the second time where he lived until his death. Despite poverty, he continued to be active in Polish and Lithuanian cultural life. He contributed articles to various Polish and Lithuanian periodicals, including Wiek where he had a regular column. His largest published work, a Lithuanian grammar in Polish, was published posthumously in 1890.

== Biography ==
=== Early life and education ===
Akelaitis was born in Čiuoderiškės near Marijampolė to a family of peasants. His father participated in the Uprising of 1831 and was sentenced to exile in Siberia where he died. Akelaitis' stepgrandfather fought in the Battle of Maciejowice during the Kościuszko Uprising while his grandfather's brother served in the Polish Legions in Italy and fought in the Battle of Somosierra in Spain during the Napoleonic Wars. Orphaned Akelaitis grew up with his grandparents and stories of these campaigns. His mother obtained a housekeeper's job in Marijampolė where Akelaitis took private lessons with a local priest and an organist in Sasnava. He then enrolled into a primary school in Marijampolė which he graduated at age 17. He continued studies at the four-year secondary school in Marijampolė where he was continuously ranked as one of the best students, but quit without graduating around 1850. He continued to self-study learning several languages. In addition to his native Lithuanian, he learned Polish, Russian, German, French, Latin, some Greek, Sanskrit, and Hebrew.

=== Cultural and anti-government work ===
Akelaitis worked as a tutor of various children of the Lithuanian nobility and frequently moved around. He briefly lived in Warsaw where he contributed articles on the Lithuanian language and history to the Polish press. His first article was published in Kronika Wiadomości Krajowych i Zagranicznych in 1856, and signed as "Chłop z Mariampola" (lit. 'Peasant of Marijampolė'). He collaborated with ethnographers Oskar Kolberg and Aleksander Osipowicz. For example, Akelaitis translated 26 Samogitian songs published by Simonas Daukantas to Polish and sent them to Kolberg. In a letter dated 3 December 1857 to historian Michał Baliński, he wrote:

"We should lift up the Lithuanian language, wrest away from scorn that language which has the Sanskrit greatness, the Latin force, the Greek refinement, and the Italian melodiousness."

The letter, published in Teka Wileńska, was also one of the first to publicly raise the idea of publishing a Lithuanian-language newspaper. In 1858, Akelaitis moved to Jaunsvirlauka (German: Neu-Bergfried) in Courland to live with Petras Smuglevičius, a medical doctor and a relative of painter Franciszek Smuglewicz. There he found Simonas Daukantas who wrote the first Lithuanian-language history of Lithuania. Akelaitis treated Daukantas as a fatherly figure and they supported each other's work. Akelaitis, Daukantas, and bishop Motiejus Valančius wanted to establish Pakeleivingas, a Lithuanian-language periodical aimed at the ordinary village people, but could not get government's permission. Akelaitis began contributing to the Polish press in Vilnius and organizing publication of Lithuanian books. He managed to obtain financial support from Lithuanian nobles, including Ireneusz Kleofas Oginski and Wilhelm Trojden Radziwiłł of Pavoloch and publish five Lithuanian booklets in 1860. Akelaitis taught Ogiński's children in Rietavas and hoped to establish a Lithuanian printing press. Adam Honory Kirkor invited him to work for Kurier Wileński but Akelaitis refused as the pay was too low. In 1860, Akelaitis was elected a member of the Vilnius Archaeological Commission.

In 1861, Akelaitis joined the anti-Tsarist resistance leading to the Uprising of 1863. Together with Tadeusz Korzon, he organized a demonstration in Aleksotas, Kaunas on 12 August 1861 to commemorate the Union of Lublin. According to the diary of Jakub Gieysztor, Akelaitis had no money and so he donated his mother's ring and watch for the demonstration. Akelaitis wrote anti-government texts in Lithuanian: prose Gromata Wylniaus Senelio ("Letter of an Old Man from Vilnius") in which he described how the Russian police killed five innocent people in Warsaw and Pasaka senelio ("Fairytale of an Old Man") in verse. The two works were translated into Polish and Russian. He sent the texts to Memel (Klaipėda) to publish but the publisher instead turned the texts to the police. Akelaitis also published Giesmes nabożnos, a Lithuanian translation of two Polish patriotic hymns, Bogurodzica (Mother of God) and Boże, coś Polskę, which were likely translated by Akelaitis or by Antanas Baranauskas. Akelaitis went into hiding frequently changing his location and eventually fleeing to Paris. Akelaitis was elected to the Polish Historical and Literary Society and obtained a well paid position at the Polish Library in Paris. He was also a member of the Paris Society of Polish Youth led by Zygmunt Padlewski.

=== Uprising and emigration ===
When the Uprising of 1863 broke out, Akeliatis returned to Lithuania and became an assistant commissioner of the Polish National Government in Augustów. He wrote proclamations, recruited men, organized weapons, etc. He published two issues of the Lithuanian newsletter Żinia apej Lenku wajna su Maskolejs ("News about the Polish War with the Muscovites") in February and March 1864. Towards the end of the uprising he escaped to East Prussia where he joined Lithuanian activities and attracted attention from the German police. He was arrested and sentenced to two years in prison, but managed to escape from the courtroom.

Akelaitis again fled to Paris where he lived until his death. He married a French woman and had three children. Living in poverty, he still worked for the Polish and Lithuanian causes, contributing articles various periodicals, including to Polish Gazeta Warszawska, Kurjer Warszawski, and Lithuanian Gazieta lietuviška and Aušra (contributed an article on the names of the Grand Dukes of Lithuania). He had a regular column in the Polish Wiek where he wrote about Parisian art exhibitions, French science and culture, Exposition Universelle (1878), etc. He edited the Lithuanian section of trilingual newspaper Zmowa – Kupos susitarimas – Hromadzki zhowor which appeared in 1870 (after the first issue, its publication was interrupted by the Franco-Prussian War). He helped Vladislovas Dembskis edit and publish a Lithuanian translation of Livre du peuple by Hugues Felicité Robert de Lamennais in 1870. In 1886, he cofounded and chaired until his death the Želmuo (literally "Sprout") society of Lithuanian emigrants. Initially, it was more a cultural organization to preserve Lithuanian language and culture among the émigrés. He did not abandon ideas of an armed struggle against the Russian Empire – a Russian informant reported in 1866 that Akelaitis was writing a Lithuanian-language "revolutionary catechism" that would be published in Switzerland and smuggled to Russia. He died in 1887 and was buried at the Cimetière parisien de Pantin. His short obituaries were published in Tygodnik Illustrowany, Biblioteka Warszawska, Ateneum.

== Works ==
Overall, Akelaitis supported the former Polish–Lithuanian Commonwealth and the Polish-Lithuanian identity – he believed that Lithuanians should join the Polish nation, but keep their language and culture. He was also a positivist. Akelaitis wrote works on the Lithuanian language, literature, folklore, mythology, history. He advocated the use of the Lithuanian language, but his articles and studies for the intelligentsia were written in Polish as it was considered the language of culture at the time. Only texts addressed and meant for the common folk were written in Lithuanian. Akelaitis' Lithuanian texts were written mostly in the Western Aukštaitian dialect and attempted to use correct language, avoid various loan words, use lively descriptions from everyday speech. He tended to use etymological and not phonetic spelling. To avoid loan words, he created Lithuanian terminology. Many reference works credit him as the author of žodynas, the Lithuanian word for dictionary, but likely he borrowed the word from Jurgis Pabrėža.

=== Published ===
In 1858, Akelaitis published Słówko o bogach litewskich, a study on the pagan Lithuanian mythology. It was mainly a commentary and corrections of the mythology section in the nine-volume history of Lithuania by Teodor Narbutt. He attributed the Prussian trinity (Potrimpo, Peckols, and Perkūnas) to Lithuanians and analyzed their names from the linguistic point of view. It was first published as an article in Biblioteka Warszawska and then as a separate booklet. The same year he published a panegyric poem in Lithuanian dedicated to Tsar Alexander II of Russia and his visit to Vilnius (because it was submitted late, it was not included in the main album, but published separately). Several former students and professors of Vilnius University hoped to persuade the Tsar to reopen the university.

In 1860, with the help of Adam Honory Kirkor, Akelaitis published five works in Lithuanian (in total, 26,000 copies) as the first works of the planned folk library series. It was a Lithuanian (Western Aukštaitian dialect) primer, two prayer books, and two reworkings of short didactic stories by Jan Chodźko, Kwestorius po Lietuwą ważinedamas żmonis bemokinąsis (Quaestor, Traveling Across Lithuania, Teaches People) and Jonas Iszmisłoczius kromininkas (Shopkeeper John the Wise), which in turn was a reworking of a French story by Laurent-Pierre de Jussieu and was already published in Lithuanian in 1823. These stories provided some educational facts from geography, history, natural sciences and promoted teetotalism. The primer, originally 59 pages long, was shortened and republished the same year in 22-page and 31-page editions. The primer was republished in 1867, 1869, 1872. After the Lithuanian press ban was enacted in 1864, the primer was frequently used in illegal village Lithuanian schools.

In 1885, Akelaitis published 49-page Rzut oka na starożytność narodu litewskiego (A Glance at the Antiquity of the Lithuanian People), which he originally wrote in Lithuanian. Akelaitis was also a poet and published a few of his poems, including poems in Teka Wileńska (six volumes published in 1857–1858), poems dedicated to Nicolaus Copernicus and Lithuanian goddess Aušrinė in the Polish periodical Gazeta Toruńska, Moja miłość (My Love) in Mrówka in 1869, Stracona owieczka (Lost Sheep) in a Polish calendar published by Jan Jaworski in 1877.

His largest published work, the first part of a Lithuanian grammar in Polish which discussed phonetics, was published posthumously by Zygmunt Celichowski in 1890. The manuscript of the second unpublished part is kept at the Kórnik Library. The work included Akelaitis' biography written by Venceslas Gasztowtt. Akelaitis started his work with a lengthy introduction describing the distribution of Lithuanian speakers and Lithuanian dialects (based on research of Antanas Baranauskas). The grammar which focuses on sounds and pronunciations is full of amateurish etymologies and unscientific theories. However, it is still valuable for lists of words and cited examples.

=== Unpublished ===
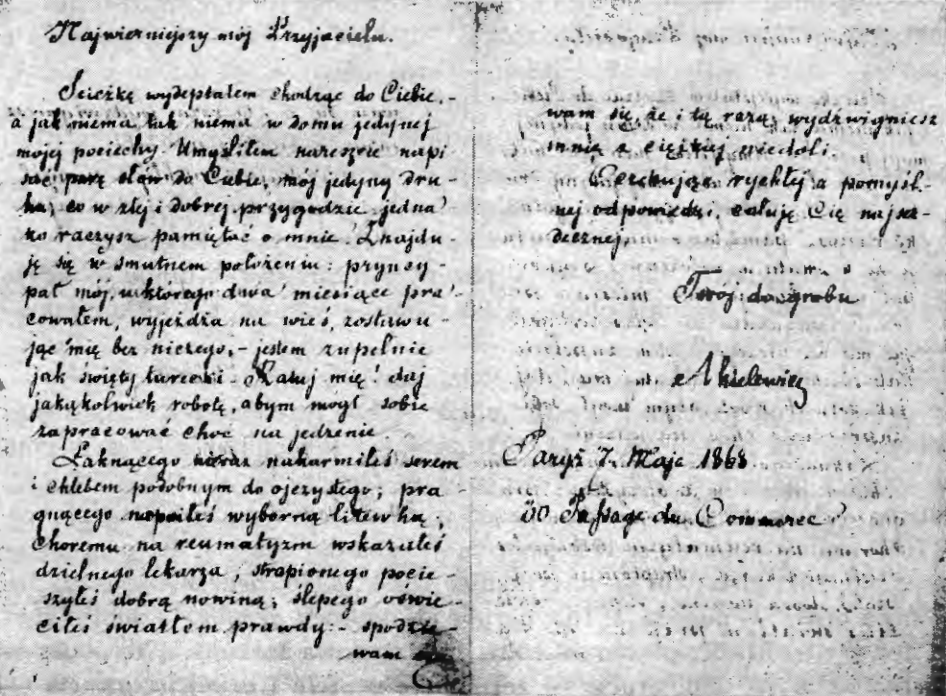
A letter written by Akelaitis in 1868

Many other works by Akelaitis remained unpublished or unfinished. His favorite research subject was linguistics and Lithuanian language. He lived at the time when the comparative linguistics emerged as a discipline, and he worked to compare Lithuanian with other Indo-European languages. His ambitious project was the compilation of three dictionaries: Lithuanian–Polish, Polish–Lithuanian, and comparative dictionary of Lithuanian, Slavic, Greek, and Sanskrit languages. Biblioteka Warszawska mentioned in 1860 that the Lithuanian–Polish and the comparative dictionaries were ready, but the manuscripts have not survived. Akelaitis also studied Lithuanian phonetics, prepositions, grammatical cases, tenses, etymology, etc. However, as a self-taught amateur, he developed unscientific etymologies and theories – for example, in developing etymologies, he relied on pronunciation similarities instead of employing the comparative method.

In 1862, with financial support from Valerian Kalinka, Akelaitis wrote his largest work, the Polish-language Opisanie Wielkiego Księstwa Litewskiego (Description of the Grand Duchy of Lithuania) or Litwa pod rządem Rossyjskim (Lithuania under the Russian Rule). The manuscript, preserved at the Polish Library in Paris, was first described by Paulius Galaunė in 1924 and remains unpublished. It is an unfinished 387-page study on Lithuania, its territory, inhabitants, economy, religion, education, administration under the Russian Empire. The work mixed statistical data with emotional condemnation of the Tsarist regime and its Russification policies, discussed the abolition of serfdom in 1861 and accused the regime of economic and agricultural downturn, and idealized the policies of the former Polish–Lithuanian Commonwealth (e.g. religious tolerance or the Statutes of Lithuania). The work was modeled after Kalinka's Galicya i Kraków pod panowaniem austryackiem (Galicia and Kraków under the Austrian Rule) about the Austrian Partition published in 1853.

He started working on a translation of Herodotus and Karl von Rotteck to Polish, wrote a short didactic work on the history of Lithuania, and a comedy in Polish (1859). His manuscript of a Polish translation of the Lithuanian epic poem The Seasons by Kristijonas Donelaitis was confiscated by the police in 1861. He wrote a Lithuanian booklet on trains and steam engines in which he had to create about a hundred Lithuanian technical terms. He also collected Lithuanian folk fairy tales – his collection was used by Jonas Basanavičius in his published collection of Lithuanian folklore.

== Bibliography ==
- Kosman, Marcelu (1980). "Akielewicz i Celichowski. Ze stostunków polsko-litewskich w drugiej połowie XIX wieku". Pamiętniki Biblioteki Kórnickiej (in Polish). 16.
