= Matthäus Prätorius =

Prussian-Lithuanian historian

- Born: c. 1635; Memel, Duchy of Prussia
- Died: c. 1704 or 1707; Wejherowo, Polish–Lithuanian Commonwealth
- Other name: Matas Pretorijus
- Education: University of Königsberg; University of Rostock
- Occupations: Priest, historian, ethnographer
- Notable work: Deliciae Prussicae, oder Preussische Schaubühne

Matthäus Prätorius (Latin: Matthaeus Praetorius, Lithuanian: Matas Pretorijus; c. 1635 – c. 1704) was a Protestant pastor in the Duchy of Prussia and later a Roman Catholic priest in the Polish–Lithuanian Commonwealth. He is best known as the author of Deliciae Prussicae, oder Preussische Schaubühne (Prussian Delights, or Prussian Theater), a historical and ethnographic work about Old Prussia. By focusing on cultural history, this large two-volume work provides an independent and original outlook on Prussian culture and history. The work includes examples of the customs and folklore of the locals which modern researchers particularly value. Deliciae Prussicae has not been published. In 1998, the Lithuanian Institute of History began publishing the full work in original German and Lithuanian translation.

== Biography ==
=== Early life and education ===
The date of birth of Prätorius is unknown but is estimated to be c. 1635. It is believed that he was born in Memel (Klaipėda) as his father was a deacon in Memel and later in life he signed some of his works as Memelensis Borussus (Prussian from Memel). Praetorius (from Latin praetor) was commonly adopted as a surname by educated Germans. According to Daniel Heinrich Arnoldt, Prätorius' father was from Schwedt in Brandenburg while Prätorius claimed to be a descendant of Jonas Bretkūnas (their exact relationship is unknown, but likely Bretkūnas was maternal great-grandfather). He probably grew up speaking both German and Lithuanian, which helped him when preaching to the ethnic Lithuanians in Ducal Prussia.

With two older brothers, Prätorius enrolled at the University of Königsberg in 1650 but was likely too young as he re-enrolled in April 1654. In 1657, he transferred to the University of Rostock where he received a master's in free arts and philosophy in June 1660. He defended his master's in philosophy at the University of Königsberg in 1661.

=== Lutheran pastor ===
After his studies, Prätorius returned to Memel. For about three years he worked as an assistant to pastor Johann Lehman and served the Lithuanian-speaking population of villages on the Curonian Spit and near the Curonian Lagoon. In 1663 or 1664, Prätorius moved to Niebudszen where he was a Lutheran pastor for twenty years. It was a mid-sized parish and the majority of the population was Lithuanian speaking (Prätorius referred to them as Nadruvians).

Prätorius' relationship with his ecclesiastical superiors was tense. Already in 1670–1671, there were unknown complaints against Prätorius investigated by a committee of local officials and clergy. In 1673, there were financial complaints and the consistory of Sambia fined Prätorius and threatened to defrock him. However, Prätorius appealed and the case dragged on until 1682. This case, as well as criticism of his historical work by Christoph Hartknoch, meant that Prätorius could not get a job in Königsberg (where he could use libraries and archives for his research) or find a patron to finance his research.

There is evidence that by the early 1680s, Prätorius questioned the truth of Protestantism. In 1683, he started writing a work on a union between Protestant and Catholic churches. In May 1684, Prätorius left his wife and debts in Niebudszen and moved to the Catholic Oliwa Abbey near Danzig. He later obtained official divorce. Catalyst for this move might have been a personal tragedy. A 19th-century priest who worked in Niebudszen recorded a local rumour that Prätorius' daughter killed herself because she was pregnant out of wedlock.

=== Catholic priest ===
In Oliwa, Prätorius became a royal historiographer of John III Sobieski, King of Poland and Grand Duke of Lithuania. He wrote several panegyrics, the first of which was Scutum Regium (Royal Shield) about the Sobieski's victory in the Battle of Vienna in 1683. However, his writing career was not profitable and did not last long and by 1687 he returned to preaching. He briefly worked as a Catholic priest in Brodnica, Wejherowo, Starogard Gdański, Góra. He settled more permanently in Wejherowo which the king owned. In 1701, Prätorius wrote a letter protesting the use of torture to extract a confession from a woman accused of witchcraft.

Prätorius' date of death is not known. 19th-century historiography provided 1707 as the date of death. In his 1907 work Geschichte der Kreise Neustadt und Putzig, Franz Schultz, who had access to now-lost city archives of Wejherowo, wrote that Prätorius was priest until 6 October 1704. However, it is unclear whether that is his date of death or simply a date he moved to a new position.

== Works ==
=== Deliciae Prussicae ===
==== Publication history ====
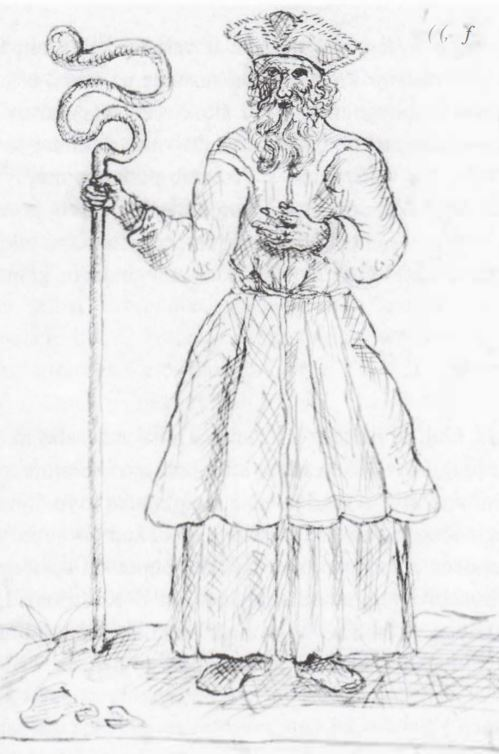
A man with krywule (ceremonial staff) as drawn by Prätorius

In 1680 or 1681, Prätorius travelled to Danzig in an unsuccessful attempt to find a publisher. He did manage to publish a summary (Syllabus materiarum) of the planned work in 1681. It was critically received by Christoph Hartknoch who worked on his own history of Prussia. Hartknoch evaluated the summary as providing no new information and copying the badly translated Latin dissertation of one of his students; this criticism effectively derailed Prätorius' efforts.

Despite the best efforts, Prätorius managed to publish only two sections of Deliciae Prussicae: Orbis Gothicus (World of Goths; 1688–1689) and Mars Gothicus (Mars of Goths; 1691). These two works concerned with the peoples that he believed originated from Goths and their culture, military, and politics. The full manuscript was finished around 1690, but some additions and corrections were made as late as 1701. In 1703, Prätorius gave his manuscript to Adam Bogislaus Rubach, resident of the Margraviate of Brandenburg in Danzig, who tried to get royal funding for the publication.

Excerpts from Deliciae Prussicae were published in 1725 in Erleutertes Preußen by David Braun (on Prussian money) and in 1731 in Acta Borussica by Michael Lilienthal (on Prussian language). More excerpts were published by John William Pierson in 1871 and Wilhelm Mannhardt in 1936. A complete edition with original German text and Lithuanian translation, is under preparation by the Lithuanian Institute of History. The first volume was published in 1999; the fifth volume (up to 9th book) was published in 2019.

==== Known manuscripts ====
There are five known manuscripts of Deliciae Prussicae:

- 412-page clean manuscript of 1st–7th books with 17 illustrations (this is the manuscript that Prätorius gave to Rubach for publication; the second volume was lost during World War II; kept at Vilnius University)
- 1667-page copy of the full clean manuscript made in 1780 (found in Lochstedt Castle and kept at the Wroblewski Library of the Lithuanian Academy of Sciences)
- 555-page draft manuscript of 10th–17th books (kept at the Gdańsk Library of the Polish Academy of Sciences)
- Copy of the 13th book (kept at the Berlin State Library)
- Copy of the 18th book (kept at the University Library of Humboldt University of Berlin)

==== Sources ====
Prätorius started writing his life's work Deliciae Prussicae when he lived in Niebudszen where he gathered ethnographic information from locals. Despite living in the province, Prätorius used libraries in Königsberg, including the Wallenrod Library. He also gained access to the manuscript collection of Caspar Hennenberger. He collaborated with other Prussian researchers and university professors, including Johann Röling, Christoph Hartknoch, Philipp Jakob Hartmann.

Prätorius used a great variety of sources, including ancient historians (Herodotus, Tacitus, Jordanes), chroniclers (Peter of Dusburg, Simon Grunau, Jan Długosz, Maciej Miechowita), medieval historians (Philipp Clüver, Johannes Micraelius, Erasmus Stella, Caspar Hennenberger), travellers (Olaus Magnus, Salomon Neugebauer, Adam Olearius), archival documents. He also used various published (e.g. Sudovian Book, Jan Malecki) and unpublished texts on Prussian mythology and customs. Most valuable information provided by Prätorius stems from his own observations of local residents. He recorded examples of customs, legends, and stories from a large area that covered most of Lithuania Minor.

==== Content and reception ====
Deliciae Prussicae is about 1700-page manuscript divided into 18 books (chapters) in two volumes. The first volume discusses onomasiology, the origin of tribes and nations, the topography of Prussia, pagan beliefs of Old Prussians, history of Christianity in Prussia. The second volume discusses Old Prussian state, law, military, nobility, money, language, etc. The volume also includes the history of the Teutonic Order and Duchy of Prussia until 1698.

Prätorius focused on cultural history and not on political history as it was common at the time. He sought to write a thorough almost encyclopedic work on Prussia while keeping it interesting and attractive to a reader. While Prätorius maintained contact with some university professors, he was outside of the academic circles which allowed him to develop an independent and original outlook on Prussian culture and history. For example, by comparing similarities between languages, he claimed that Old Prussians were descendants of Goths, but robust methods of comparative linguistics were not developed until the 19th century.

Prätorius used various sources uncritically and valued oral traditions of the local population. This evoked negative reactions from other historians and researchers who considered such information nothing more than fairytales and gossip. Modern historians recognize the value of such oral traditions but struggle to determine their authenticity. For example, Prätorius provided a lengthy legend about the Prussian king Widewuto, but it is unclear whether and to what extent this legend is copied from previous authors, recorded from local residents, or made up by Prätorius. Further, Prätorius treated Widewuto not as a legendary figure, but as a historical person merging fact and fiction.

=== Other works ===
Prätorius wrote two known texts in Lithuanian. He wrote a poem–dedication to the Compendium Grammaticae Lithvanicae (Compendium of the Lithuanian Grammar) published in 1673. In 1685, Johann Richovius published a new edition of the Lithuanian hymnal by Daniel Klein. This edition included 30 new hymns, four of which were translated by Prätorius. These hymns were later republished in many other hymnals, including one edited by Friedrich Kurschat.

Tuba pacis (Trumpet of Peace, published in 1685 and 1711, German translation in 1820) was the first larger work published by Prätorius. It called for a union between Catholic and Protestant churches. It was published in Cologne and Amsterdam and translated to German but was not well received by either the Protestant or the Catholic camp. The work was harshly criticized by the University of Königsberg and its professors published several rebuttals. The Inquisition added the work to the list of prohibited publications. This prevented Prätorius from obtaining a better position in the Catholic hierarchy.

== Bibliography ==
- Biržiška, Vaclovas (1960). Aleksandrynas: senųjų lietuvių rašytojų, rašiusių prieš 1865 m., biografijos, bibliografijos ir biobibliografijos (in Lithuanian). Vol. I. Chicago: Lithuanian-American Cultural Fund.
- Lukšaitė, Ingė (1999). "Matas Pretorijus - Prūsijos kultūros istorikas: gyvenimas, veikla ir mokslinė kūryba". Prūsijos įdomybės, arba Prūsijos regykla. By Pretorijus, Matas. Lukšaitė, Ingė; Gerulaitienė, Vilija (eds.). Vol. 1. Vilnius: Pradai. ISBN 9986-776-82-1.
- Lukšaitė, Ingė (11 October 2022) [2018]. "Matas Pretorijus". Visuotinė lietuvių enciklopedija (in Lithuanian). Mokslo ir enciklopedijų leidybos centras.
