= Kriwe =

Chief priest in the Baltic Region

Kriwe Kriwaito (Latvian: krīvu krīvs, Lithuanian: krivių krivaitis) or simply Kriwe (Latvian: krīvs, Lithuanian: krivis) was the chief priest in the old Baltic religion. Known primarily from the dubious 16th-century writings of Simon Grunau, the concept of kriwe became popular during the times of romantic nationalism. However, lack of reliable written evidence has led some researchers to question whether such pagan priest actually existed. The title was adopted by Romuva, the neo-pagan movement in Lithuania, when Jonas Trinkūnas was officially installed as krivių krivaitis in October 2002.

== Written sources ==
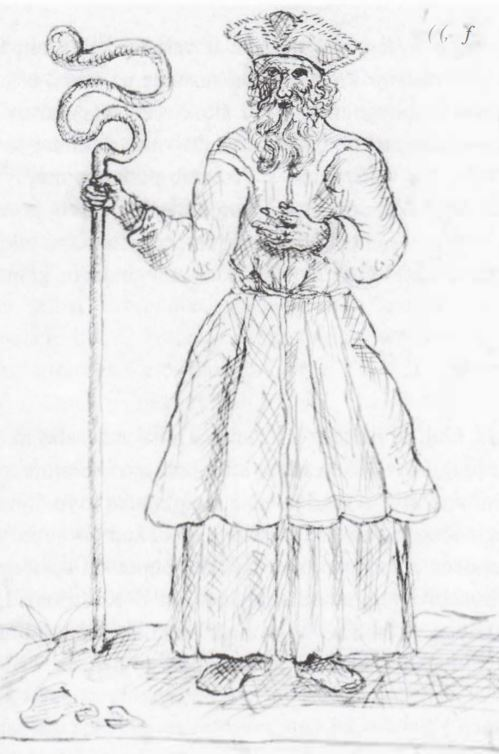
A man with krywule as drawn by Matthäus Prätorius

Peter of Dusburg wrote about kriwe in his chronicle Chronicon terrae Prussiae finished in 1326. According to him, kriwe lived in Romuva and was respected as a Catholic pope not only by the Old Prussians but also by other Baltic tribes. His envoys carried a certain rod (Latin: baculum) or another symbol and commanded respect both from the nobles and the paupers. Kriwe could see dead people and describe them to the relatives. After a military victory, people would donate a third of their loot to kriwe who burned it. The same information was repeated by Dusburg's translator Nikolaus von Jeroschin who added that it was kriwe who maintained the sacred eternal flame and translated kriwe as "the highest judge".

Jan Długosz (1415–1480) wrote that people who disobeyed kriwe faced execution. He also added that Adalbert of Prague was murdered in 997 by the order of a kriwe.

Simon Grunau (died c. 1530) provided most detailed description of the pagan priest and introduced the double title Kriwe Kriwaito or Criwo Cyrwaito. He listed the names of all kriwe, from the first Bruteno, one of the legendary kings of Prussia alongside his brother Widewuto, to Alleps. According to Grunau, kriwe was the center of both religious and political life of Prussians; for example, he could start or end wars. An elderly kriwe was supposed to sacrifice himself to the gods by self-immolation though that happened infrequently. A new kriwe would be selected by lower rank priests and prophets (also known as waidelottes).

Augustinus Rotundus (1520–1582) described the temple of Perkūnas in Šventaragis' Valley in Vilnius and that it was attended by kriwe. Maciej Stryjkowski (c. 1547 – c. 1593) wrote that Lizdeika who interpreted a dream of Grand Duke Gediminas about the Iron Wolf (the story was first written in the Lithuanian Chronicles) was a kriwe. He also wrote the double name for kriwe as kyrie kyrieito to draw parallels with Greek kyrios (lord).

Matthäus Prätorius (c. 1635 – c. 1704) described and drew examples of a crooked and twisted wooden stick called krywule. It was used by village elders to call neighbors to a gathering to discuss common matters. The tradition survived into the 19th century and a few examples of krywule were collected by ethnographers for various museums. Such gathering was mentioned by Kristijonas Donelaitis (1714–1780) in his epic poem The Seasons.

Later authors, including Jonas Bretkūnas, Marcin Kromer, Alexander Guagnini, provided no new information about kriwe.

== Interpretations ==
Since the concept of a "pagan pope" became very popular during the times of romantic nationalism but very little is actually known, interpretations abound.

=== Etymology ===
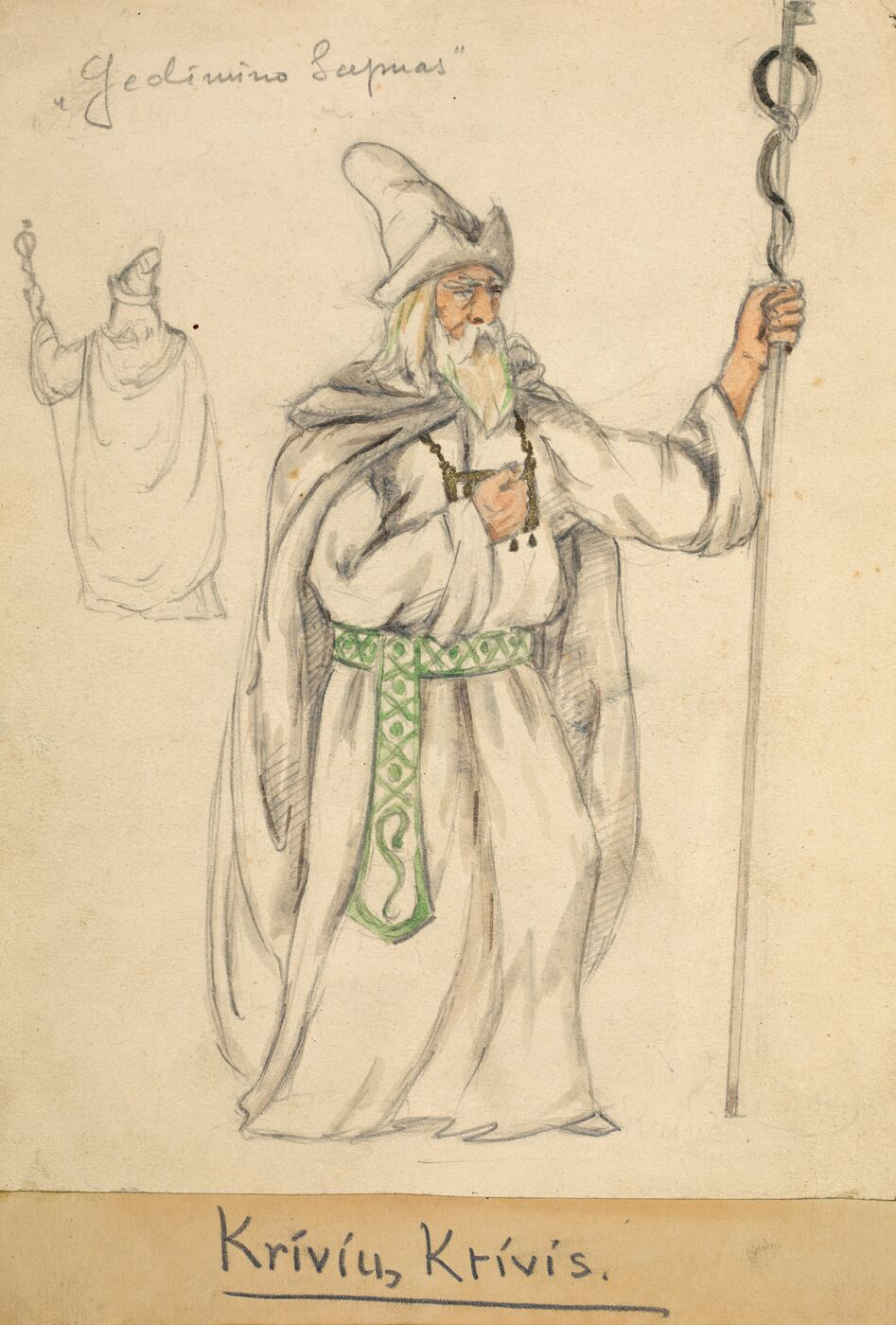
Sketch of a costume for the role of Kriwe in a theater play (1923)

The most commonly accepted etymology of kriwe is that the word is derived from "curved, crooked" (Lithuanian: kreivas, Latvian: krievs, Latin: curvus). Gottfried Ostermeyer was the first to connect kriwe with krywule, a crooked rod used in villages. Other authors that connected kriwe with the rod or with crookedness include Ludwig Passarge, Ludwig Rhesa, Aleksander Brückner, Kazimieras Būga, Vladimir Toporov.

However, there were attempts at different interpretations. Johann Erich Thunmann was the first to analyze etymology of kriwe and claimed that it was derived from German Grewe meaning chief, supervisor. Jēkabs Lange, Aaron Christian Lehrberg, and Gotthard Friedrich Stender believed that kriwe was derived from krievi, Latvian ethnonym for Russians. Kazimieras Jaunius argued that it was derived from kerėti, Lithuanian word for enchant, prophesize. Rolandas Kregždys proposed that kriwe should be derived from Curche, Prussian god mentioned in the 1249 Treaty of Christburg. Antoni Julian Mierzyński argued that kriwe was not a title but a proper name of a man.

Similarly, the double name Kriwe Kriwaito received varied interpretations. It is commonly assumed that it should be read as kriwe of kriwes (e.g. King of Kings). Kazimieras Būga believed that the double name is an error by Grunau who missed a connector between crywe kyrwaide. Vladimir Toporov suggested that kriwaito is a diminutive form of kriwe and reflect dual functions of kriwe as a religious and as a political leader.

=== Authenticity ===
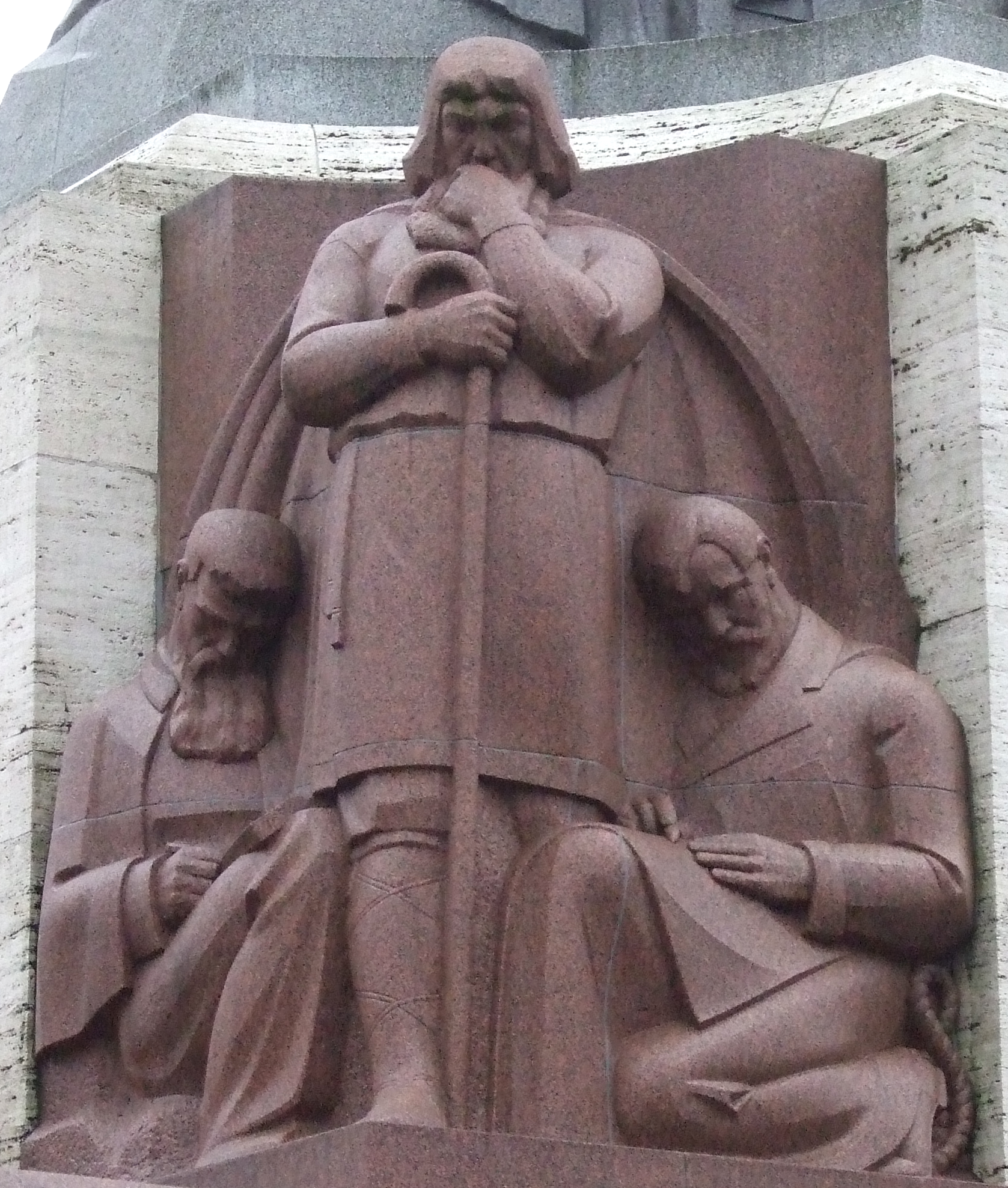
A relief of the Freedom Monument depicting an ancient Latvian Kriwe, accompanied by a modern writer and a modern scientist sheltering at his feet beneath his cloak

S. C. Rowell suggested that Peter of Dusburg invented kriwe and Romuva to portray the Baltic religion as a "counter-church". Such an account could have served several purposes: to demonstrate that pagans are so well organized that they have their own pope and pose a serious threat, to shame Christians into respecting their own pope, or to make pagan society easier to understand to a Christian reader. Rowell points to a lack of corroborating evidence from other contemporary documents or archaeological research. Aleksander Brückner suggested that kriwe never existed and that the word denoted not a title for a priest but a rod that priests sent to people to gather them for an annual sacrifice. Some authors, including Marceli Kosman and Antanas Kučinskas, went further and doubted that the pagan society even had a class of religious officials.

Kriwe as a more or less authentic pagan priest is accepted by Norbertas Vėlius and Gintaras Beresnevičius. Beresnevičius suggested that Grunau's description was drawn from Prussian tradition though likely heavily distorted. He drew parallels between Baltic kriwe and Celtic druids and suggested that the common elements could be a result of either migration or date to the common Indo-European roots.

Vladimir Toporov argued that the Crooked Castle (Lithuanian: Kreivoji pilis) in Vilnius was really Kriwe's Castle.
