= Peckols =

Prussian mythological gods

- Member of triune godhead including Potrimpo and Perkūnas (allegedly)
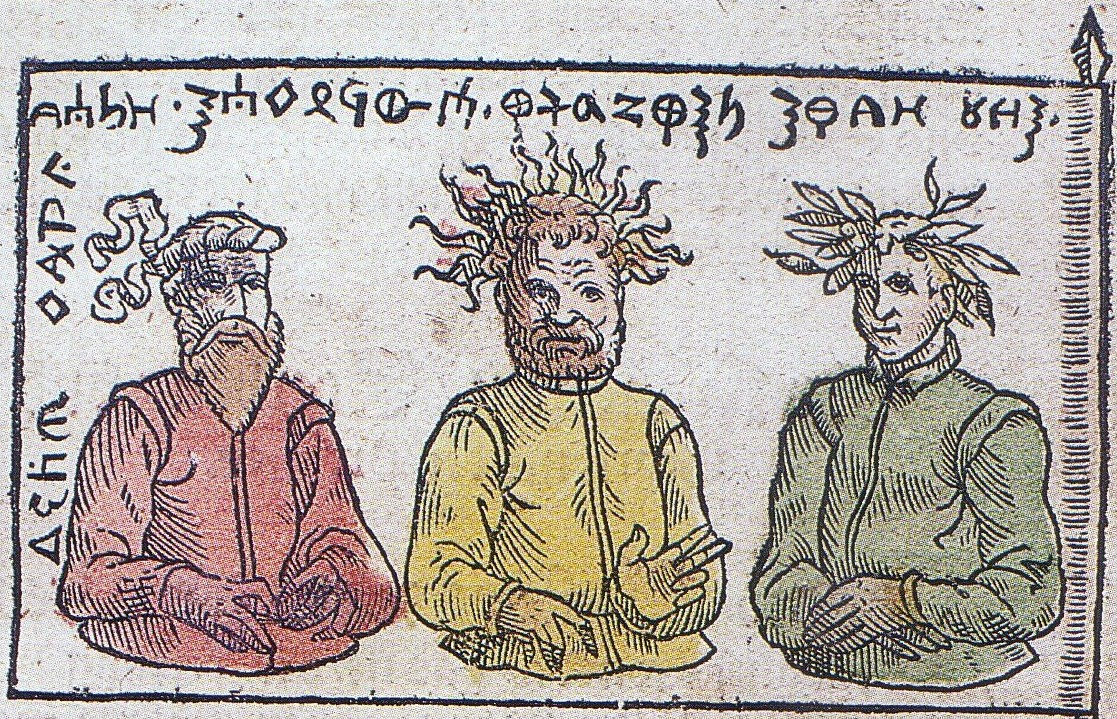
- The trinity of Perkūnas, Potrimpo, and Peckols was introduced and popularized by Simon Grunau
- Affiliation: Underworld, death, evil

Equivalents
- Slavic: Veles (god)

Peckols and Patollo, (in Lithuanian, Pikulas arba Pikuolis (Pocols, Pecols, Picullus, Pykullas) usually identified with Patulu (Patollo, Patollum, Patolli, Patolen)) were gods in the pagan Prussian mythology who were worshiped by the Old Prussians. Most researchers believe that, despite varying names, Peckols and Patollo were probably the same god in charge of the underworld and the dead. It is usually described as an angry, evil spirit similar to the Lithuanian Velnias.

Patollu was first mentioned in 1418, by Bishop of Warmia in a letter to the Pope. Chronicler Simon Grunau (1529) provided more vivid but dubious details about Patollo. According to Grunau, Patollo was one of the three gods portrayed on the flag and coat of arms of King Widewuto and worshiped in the temple of Rickoyoto. He was portrayed as an old man with a white beard and a white headdress similar to a turban. He was a frightening and ruthless god of the dead who would haunt and taunt the living if they disobeyed their pagan priests or buried the dead without proper sacrifices to the gods. Many other early modern writers, including Alexander Guagnini and Lucas David, followed Grunau in their descriptions of Patollo.

The Sudovian Book (1520s), mentioned two beings – Peckols, the god of hell and darkness, and Pockols, the airborne spirit or devil. The same pair is also found in the church decrees of 1530 (Constitutiones Synodales). There, Pecols was identified with the Roman god of the underworld, Pluto and Pocols with the Greek deities of anger, the Furies. Jan Sandecki Malecki followed the Sudovian Book and wrote about Pocclum and Poccollum. Jonas Bretkūnas, Caspar Hennenberger, and later authors attempted to reconcile the accounts provided by Grunau and the Sudovian Book. In the 17th century Christoph Hartknoch and Matthäus Prätorius testified that people still believed in Picolli and Pykullis.

== Etymology ==
Unknown, however different proposals had been suggested.

Christoph Hartknoch suggested that it might have been "derived from the Sarmatian word pieklo, which means the underworld, and some call it hell". J. I. Kraševskis believed that Pykul is “derived from the word kalu “to beat” or piktas “evil”. August Schleicher suggested it might have a Lithuanian etymology, stating that Pikul, Pikuls is formed from the root pik- / pyk- with the suffix -ul-. the words of the root peik- / poik- / pik- referred to a dead person (deceased) and his spirit (vėlė) who could play a role for the living (veliuoka, devil). In Kazimieras Būga opinion, the following are considered derivatives of the root pkieł “devil” was a deivation. In addition to pikula, Lithuanians also have the following words from the same root: peikti, piktas, pykti, paikas.

Beside this commonly accepted etymological suggestion, another Prussian etymology was suggested too, Prussian pyculs "hell", which would be a loanword from the West Slavic pьkъlъ "hell", and Pikulas "god of the underworld, i.e. the world of the dead; devil" from the common West Baltic pikulas "hostile being (mythological)". This alternative etymology was influenced by both the Slavic loanword "pekla" and the images of hell - the place of suffering for sinners - associated with Christianity. This would also be evidenced by the names of the devil in the religious Lithuanian literature of the 16th-18th centuries.

Vytautas Mažiulis also suggested two different etymologies for Peckols:

(1) pyculs ‘hell’ E 10 – a loanword from v. sl. pьkъlъ ‘etc.’ (> s. le. pkieł ‘place of the souls of sinners condemned to eternal torment, (resp. locus ubi animae commorantur eorum, qui poenas sempiternas peccatorum luunt’), although the genders s. le. piekło, piekieł are also recorded.

(2) pickūls ‘devil’ – inherited gender, derived from adjective *pikula- ‘hostile, acting hostilely’ ← verb. bl. *pik- ‘to be hostile, to act hostilely’. Unfortunately, this 2nd interpretation is impossible derivational resp. etymologically, therefore widely rejected.

== Later usage ==
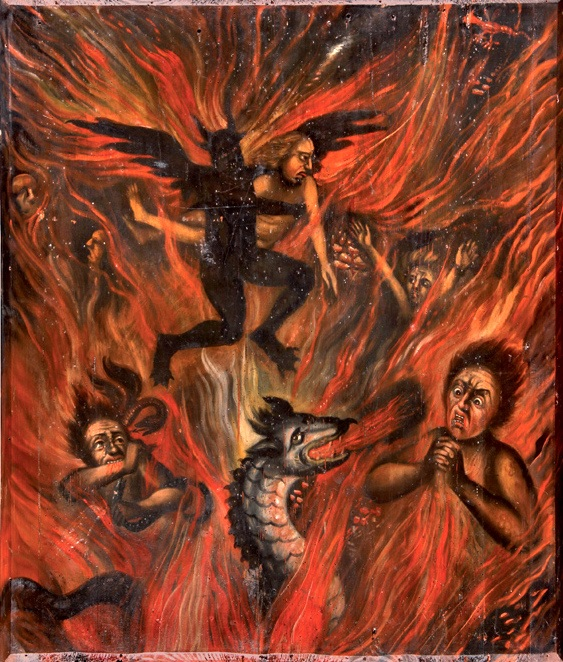
1731 Polish depiction of "Piekła" (in this context, it means inferno)

Mikalojus Daukša used the root "pik-", and the derivatives, as a direct synonym for Christian hell as it was the standard meaning of the word between the 16th century and the 17th century. In Postil of Mikalojus Daukša, there are sentences recorded such as "O piktiéii weł’ turés kûnus támʃʃus/ biaurius ir dárgius/ kaip ir pati giltine/ arba mirtis" (And the wicked will have bodies dark/ vile and precious/ like hell itself/ or death), "Bęt weiʓdék kaip piktôii dwaʃîa tarṕ tos gerós ʃêklos imaaiʃʒe ʃawų kukâlų" (But as the evil spirit tries to destroy the good seed), ir ąnt ko piktęʃnio/ kaip ąnʃai didʓ́turis (and on something more evil/ the rich man[...]) and "piktadéios anié regimiéii... ... piktžodžei[…]" (Those visible evildoers... ...and those evil-speakers). Jonas Bretkūnas for the same reason states "Picollus was an old, gray-haired man with a long gray beard, deathly pale, dressed in white cloth, looking at others from under his armpits and his name means the devil (as this non-German word also indicates). He would harm and kill", which implies during his time the root "pik-" was already associated with the evil and he goes on to classify "XIII. Pikols – god of the underworld and darkness" and "XIV. Pikuliūnus (Pikoliuni) – flying spirits, or devils".

Mikalojus Daukša also in his Catechism of Mikalojus Daukša translate hell as "pragaras", which will lead to this word eventually replacing the word hell but next to the word pragarus, Daukša included a synonym in the margin: "Jng pekłás".

Mikalojus Daukša refers to the worship of Žemyna, an unnamed Fire deity and Perkūnas, and advises against them, but does not mention the worship of Peckols. Lithuanian equivalent pictas, meaning “angry (evil)”, or to the Latvian pikals denoting “evil demon” during medieval became associated with Christian inferno. Pikulas was listed in Constitutiones Synodales and associated with hell, darkness, the devil or an evil spirit, as well as other attributes and characteristics of Pikulas, they comply with the etymology of the name and indeed the Prussian Pikulas which must have represented the dark forces of the World. In later modern times the word eventually lost the mythological aspect and beside with deity Veles (Vēlinas, Vélnias, Vēlenas, Velas, Vēlés, Velionis or Vēls) came to be associated with devilish creatures; this might suggest that both Peckols and Veles might have been the different names of same Baltic deity. By time, besides specific uses, the variants of "pik-" and "velnias" have fallen out of use to refer to demons or hell and instead in Lithuanian, the words "demonas" and "pragaras" came to be popular.
