= Prussian mythology =

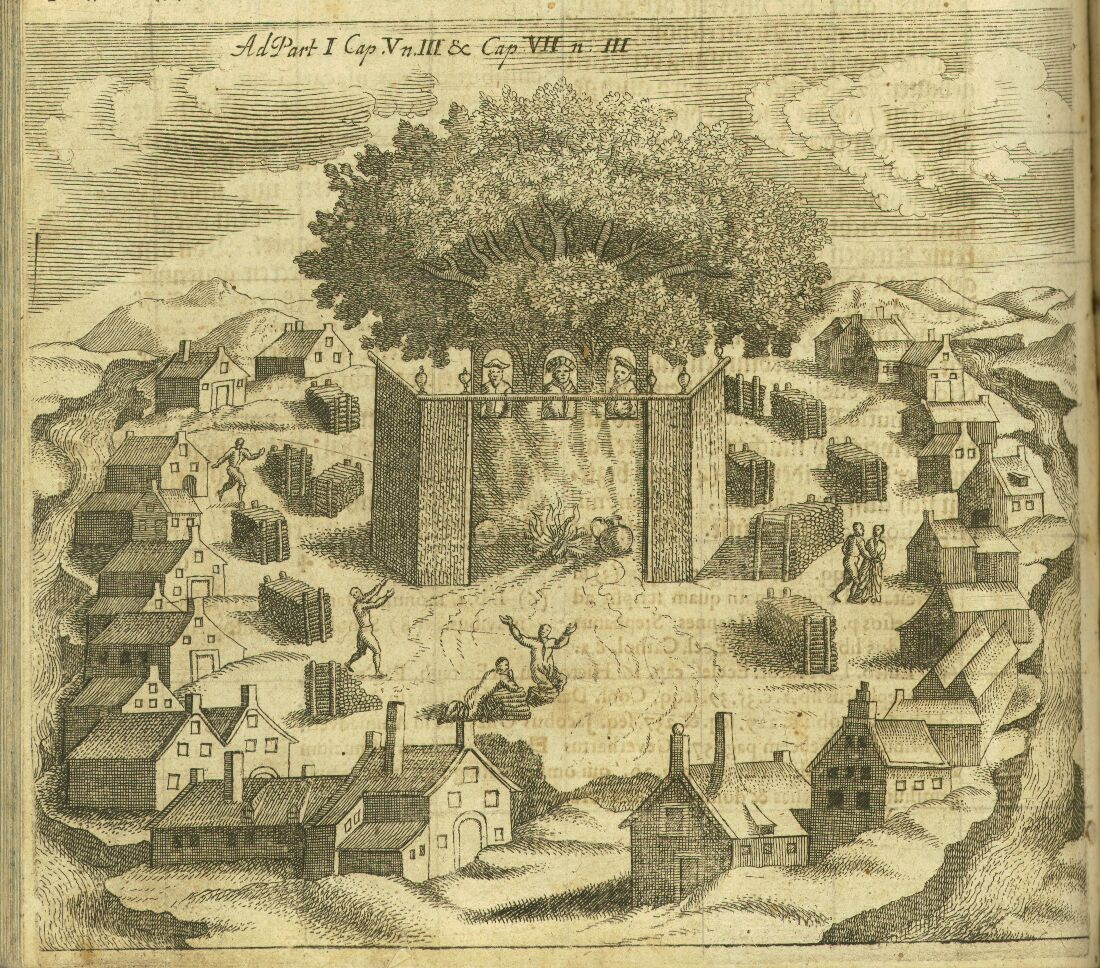
Image of the temple of Romuva according to the unreliable description by Simon Grunau

Prussian mythology is the account of what is known of the polytheistic religion of the Old Prussians, indigenous peoples of Prussia before the Prussian Crusade waged by the Teutonic Knights. This archaic Indo-European religion was closely related to other Baltic faiths, namely those of the Lithuanians and Latvians. Its myths and legends did not survive because the Old Prussian people became Germanized and their culture became extinct in the early 18th century. Fragmentary information on gods and rituals can be found in various medieval chronicles, but most of this is unreliable. No sources document pagan religion before the forced Christianization in the 13th century. Most of what is known about Prussian religion has been recovered from dubious 16th-century sources (Sudovian Book and Simon Grunau).

== Historical background and sources ==
The Teutonic Order, a crusading military order, began the Prussian Crusade in the 1220s. Their goal was to conquer and convert pagan Prussians to Christianity. The Knights built log and stone fortresses, which proved to be impregnable to the Prussians. Despite five Prussian uprisings, the conquest of Prussia was complete by the 1280s. German, Lithuanian, Latvian, and Polish colonists repopulated the decimated region. It is estimated that by around the year 1400 the (Old) Prussians numbered 100,000 and comprised only about half the total population of Prussia. The Prussians were subject to Germanization and assimilation and eventually became extinct sometime after the 16th century. The Knights regarded paganism as evil and therefore unworthy of study, deserving, in their eyes, only complete eradication. For this reason they showed no interest in local customs and produced no detailed accounts of Prussian mythology. Reliable, (but, alas, accidental and fragmentary) references to gods and traditions can be found in official Teutonic documents and chronicles, such as the 1248 Treaty of Christburg, the Chronicle of Peter von Dusburg, and correspondence with the Pope.

Affected by the Protestant Reformation, the former Catholic stronghold the Monastic State of the Teutonic Knights was transformed into the Lutheran Duchy of Prussia in 1525. Religious disputes kindled a new interest in the pagan Prussian religion, two fundamental studies of Prussian culture being produced at that time, namely the Sudovian Book and Chronicle of Simon Grunau. There is considerable academic debate on the authorship, dating, and reliability of the Sudovian Book. Most modern Lithuanian scholars follow Wilhelm Mannhardt in treating it as a reliable and independent source, which was used to prepare Constitutiones Synodales, a book of ceremonies prepared by a church synod and published in 1530. However, another school of thought holds that it is, in fact, nothing of the kind, the Sudovian Book being claimed to be a distorted copy of Synodales, which in turn was based on Grunau - and consequently that all three sources should be rejected as mere "invention" and "forgery".

Simon Grunau (died ca. 1530) is much criticised for his use of dubious and falsified sources and frequent eking-out of whatever meagre data he may have possessed with the products of his own imagination. Modern scholars often dismiss the chronicle as a work of fiction, though Lithuanian researchers tend to be more careful and attempt to find in it redeeming qualities. The work is responsible for the introduction and popularization of several major legends: 6th-century King Widewuto, the temple of Romuva, the pagan trinity (Peckols, Potrimpo, and Perkūnas), the pagan high priest (Kriwe-Kriwajto), and female waidelinns (similar to Roman vestales).

Various later authors simply copied information from Grunau and the Sudovian Book adding no or very little new information.

== Prussian pantheon ==
=== Early lists ===
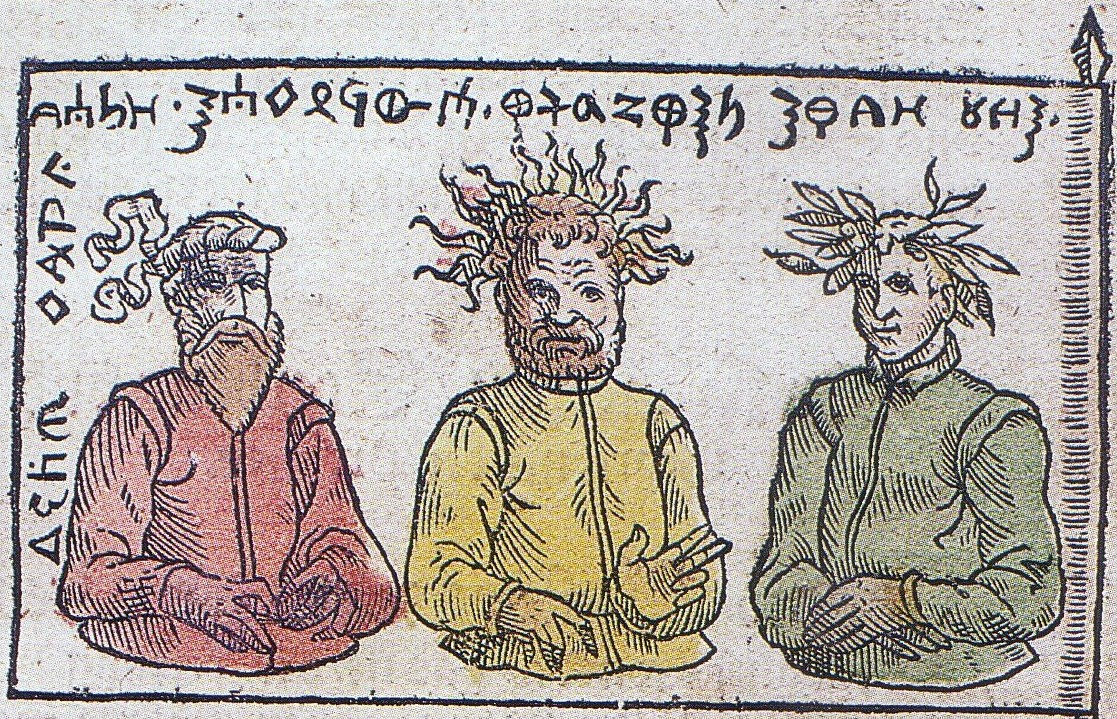
Prussian gods Peckols, Perkūnas and Potrimpo by Simon Grunau

The 1249 Treaty of Christburg mentioned Curche, an idol worshiped during harvest festivals. Scholars were unable to positively determine its gender, function, or etymology. Various suggested functions include god of food (Simon Grunau), smithing god (similar to Slavic Svarog and Greek Hephaestus), god creator (derived from related Lithuanian word kurti – to create), god of harvest and grain, evil spirit, god of fire. Some even doubted whether it was a god at all and suggested that it was a name given to a corn dolly.

Another reliable source is a 1418 memorandum (Collato Episcopi Varmiensis) written by Bishop of Warmia to Pope Martin V. The letter reminded the Pope about the Teutonic achievements in Christianizing Prussians, who no longer worshiped Patollu and Natrimpe. Most scholars interpret this as two different gods, but patollu could also be an adjective (evil, hellish) to describe Natrimpe. Based on later works, patollu is usually identified as Peckols, angry god of the underworld, and Natrimpe as Potrimpo, god of seas or grain.

In addition to the trinity of Peckols, Potrimpo, and Perkūnas, Grunau mentioned three minor gods: Wurschayto or Borszkayto and Szwaybrotto were personifications of Widewuto and Bruteno, and Curcho was god of food (borrowed from the Treaty of Christburg).

=== Sudovian Book and Constitutiones Synodales ===
Constitutiones lists ten Prussian deities and also provides their classical Roman equivalents. Note that none of these are goddesses and furthermore that Curche is missing from the list. This list is closely mirrored in the Sudovian Book.

Constitutiones Synodales	Sudovian Book	Function	Roman equivalent
Occopirmus	Ockopirmus	Chief sky god	Saturnus
Suaixtix	Becker	God of light	Sol
Ausschauts	Auschauts	God of the sick	Aesculapius
Autrympus	Autrimpus	God of seas	Castor
Potrympus	Potrimpus	God of running water	Pollux
Bardoyas	Bardoayts	God of ships	Neptune
	Pergrubrius	God of plants	
Piluuytus	Pilnitis	God of abundance	Ceres
Parcuns	Parkuns	God of thunder	Jupiter
Pecols and Pocols	Peckols and Pockols	God of hell, evil spirit	Pluto, Furies
	Puschkayts	God of earth	
	Barstucke and Markopole	Servants of Puschkayts	

=== Suaixtix ===
Suaixtix (alternate spelling: Suaixtis, Swaystix, Schwaytestix, Swaikticks, Sweigtigx, Szweigsdukks, Šwaigzdunks, Sweigsdunka, Žvaigždzuks) (Note: His name in Lithuanian is Svaistikas or Svaikstikas "illuminator". However, scholar Marija Gimbutas supposed that his nomenclature in modern Lithuanian would have been Žvaigždys, from žvaigždē 'star'.) is described as a "god of light" (Gott des Lichts) in historical sources, or a god of stars. His name has been proposed to be cognate to the word for star in Slavic languages, reconstructed as *zvězda. (Note: Old Church Slavonic (d)zvezda; Bulgarian zvezdá; Serbo-Croatian zvijezda; Slovene zvézda; Russian zvezdá; Ukrainian zvizda (archaic); Polish gwiazda; Kashubian gviazda; Polabian gjozda; Sorbian gvijezda (low), hvijezda (high); Czech hvezda; Slovak hviezda.) He also appears to be connected to words for "star" in Baltic languages: Lith žvaigždė and Latv zvaigzne. (Note: One historical source even remarked on this etymological connection: "denn Sweigsde ein Stern heisset" ["then sweigsde means 'a star'."]) The deity's name seems to contain a Prussian stem -swaigst-, present in swaigst-an (perhaps related to German Schein, "light") and verb er-schwaigstinai ("[it] illuminates").

On the other hand, still aligned with the interpretation as god of light, Roman Zaroff postulates that Suaixtix might have been a solar deity, basing his contention on ethnographical and folkloric data from the other Baltic languages.

== Bibliography ==
General overview

- Mikhailov, N. "Das “gemischte” slawisch-baltische Pantheon von Christian Knauthe". In: Res Balticae Nr. 01, 1995. pp. 115–139.
- Zaroff, Roman. "Some aspects of pre-Christian Baltic religion". In: New researches on the religion and mythology of the Pagan Slavs. Edited by Patrice Lajoye. Paris: Lingva, 2019. pp. 183–219.

Studies on the deities

- Ivanov, V. V. "The Baltic god of light and the Balto-Slavic word for star". In: Res Balticae, Nr. 02, 1996. pp. 135–149.
