= Romuva =

Romuva may refer to:

- Romuva (temple), an ancient worship place in Old Prussia
- Romuva (religion), a pagan movement in modern Lithuania
- Lithuanian name for Pravdinsk, town in Kaliningrad Oblast, Russia
- Romuva, heaven in the philosophical writings of Vydūnas
