= Žemyna =

Lithuanian goddess

- Earth
- Consort: Perkūnas or Praamžius

Equivalents
- Greek: Semele or Gaia
- Indo-European: Dʰéǵʰōm
- Thracian: Zemele

Žemyna (also Žemynėlė or Žemelė) (from Lithuanian: žemė – earth) is the goddess of the earth in Lithuanian religion. She is usually regarded as mother goddess and one of the chief Lithuanian gods similar to Latvian Zemes māte. Žemyna personifies the fertile earth and nourishes all life on earth, human, plant, and animal. All that is born of earth will return to earth, thus her cult is also related to death. As the cult diminished after baptism of Lithuania, Žemyna's image and functions became influenced by the cult of Virgin Mary.

== Name ==
Žemyna stems from the name of Proto-Indo-European Earth-goddess *Dʰéǵʰōm. It relates to Thracian Zemele ('mother earth') and Greek Semelē (Σεμέλη).

== Role ==
Žemyna was first mentioned by Jan Łasicki (1582). It was later also described by Mikalojus Daukša (1595), Daniel Klein (1653), Matthäus Prätorius, Jacob Brodowski (1740), and in numerous folk legends, beliefs, and prayers. Prätorius described a ritual, called žemyneliauti, performed at major celebrations (e.g. weddings) or agricultural works (e.g. harvest). The head of the household would drink a cup of beer, but first, he would spill some of the drink on the ground and say a short prayer. Then he would kill a rooster or a hen, which would be cooked and eaten by the entire family. Each family member would receive a loaf of bread and say prayers, blessings, and greetings. The bones and other scraps would be sacrificed to the goddess (burned or buried). Other recorded rites included burying bread baked from last crops of prior harvest in a field before new sowing and sacrifice of a black piglet. People would also kiss the earth saying a short prayer thanking Žemyna for all her gifts and acknowledging that one day they will return to her. People addressed Žemyna in various affectionate diminutive names and epithets.

In addition, historical sources on Baltic mythology describe the dual role of goddess Zemyna: while she was connected to the fertility of the land, she was also associated with receiving the dead and acting as their ruler and guardian. (Note: "Zemyna (otherwise Zemlja or Perkunatelé) is the earth-goddess and psychopomp of the dead.") Pieces of Lithuanian folklore also make references to Earth as mother of humans and their final abode after death. (Note: "Archeological findings witness that the most ancient phase of Lithuanian culture was definitely Zemyna's culture. The distinguishing factor in these findings was the burial rites. In the oldest cultural phase, the dead were buried - given back to Zemyna, Mother Earth.") (Note: Lithuanian ethnologue Nijolė Laurinkienė, at the end of her book on Zemyna, writes thus: "Žemyna was also imagined as the giver and supporter of human life, because like flora and fauna, humanity is a part of nature. (...) The newborn would immediately be laid down on Mother Earth as if she were its biological mother, so that she could ‘accept’ and ‘embrace’ the infant as her own earthly creation and give it vegetative power and vitality on a cosmic plane. (...)".)

=== Family ===
The goddess is said to be married to either Perkūnas (thunder god) or Praamžius (manifestation of chief heavenly god Dievas). Thus the couple formed the typical Indo-European pair of mother-earth and father-sky. It was believed that the earth needs to be fertilized by the heavens (rain and thunder). Thus it was prohibited to plow or sow before the first thunder as the earth would be barren.

== In modern culture ==
The Lithuanian folk music group Kūlgrinda in collaboration with Donis released an album in 2013 titled Giesmės Žemynai, meaning "Hymns to Žemyna".

== Related male deities ==
Other characters in Lithuanian mythology are related, etymologically or semantically, to goddess Žemyna and a cult of the earth, such as Žemėpatis ('Earth Spouse') and Žemininkas, male deities associated with cattle, agriculture and the fertility of the land. Their names are present in historical records of the Lithuanian non-Christian faith by foreign missionaries.

Another male divinity with the name Zemeluks, Zamoluksei, Zameluks or Ziameluks is also said to be attested. An account tells he is a DEUS TERRAE ('earth god'), while in other he is "a lord or god of earth who was buried in the earth" by the Prussians.

== See also ==
- Zam
- Proto-Indo-European mythology
- Indo-European cosmogony
- Baltic mythology
- Prussian mythology
- Lithuanian mythology
- Semele
- Māra
- List of Lithuanian gods and mythological figures
