= Potrimpo =

Pagan Baltic and Prussian god of seas, earth, grain, and crops

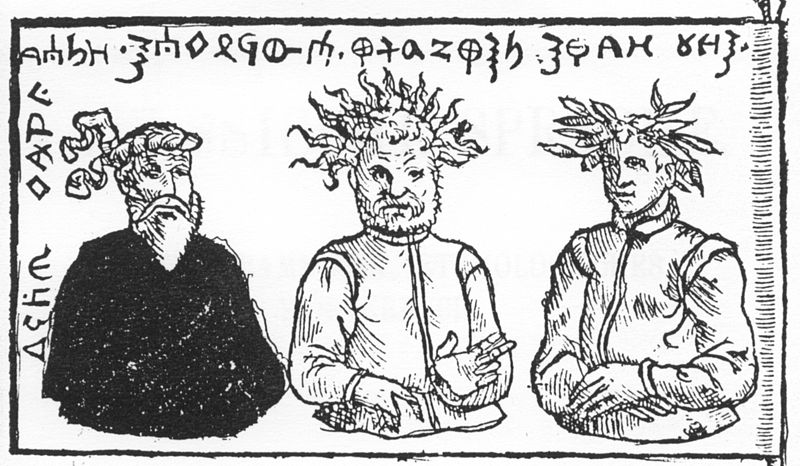
The purported Flag of Widewuto (Potrimpo on the right)

Potrimpo (also Potrimpus, Autrimpo, Natrimpe) was a god of seas, earth, grain, and crops in the pagan Baltic, and Prussian mythology. He was one of the three main gods worshiped by the Old Prussians. Most of what is known about this god is derived from unreliable 16th-century sources.

He was first mentioned (as Natrimpe) in a 1418 memorandum Collatio Espiscopi Varmiensis sent by the Bishop of Warmia to Pope Martin V. The document reminded the Pope that the Teutonic Knights successfully Christianized pagan Prussians, who previously worshipped "demons" Perkūnas, Potrimpo and Peckols (and Patollo). Simon Grunau claimed that Potrimpo was a god of grain and together with thunder god Perkūnas and death god Peckols formed a pagan trinity. He was depicted on the purported Flag of Widewuto as a young, merry man wearing a wreath of grain ears. Grunau further claimed that snakes, as creatures of Potrimpo, were worshipped and given milk (cf. žaltys). The Sudovian Book (1520–1530) listed Potrimpo (Potrimpus) as god of running water and Autrimpo (Autrimpus) as god of the seas. The Constitutiones Synodales, a church ceremony book published in 1530, likened Potrimpo with Pollux and Autrimpo with Castor and Neptune, from Roman mythology.

Later authors copied these descriptions, often merging Potrimpo and Autrimpo into one deity of earth and water. Jan Sandecki Malecki claimed that Prussians would pray to Potrimpo, pour hot wax into water, and predict the future based on the shapes of wax figures. Maciej Stryjkowski wrote that there was a copper idol (a twisted žaltys) to Potrimpo in the temple of Romuva. Simonas Daukantas described Potrimpo as the god of spring, happiness, abundance, cattle and grain.

According to Kazimieras Būga, the name was derived from the root trimp-, which is related to Lithuanian verb trempti (to trample, to stomp). Following this research, Vladimir Toporov believed that initially there was a fertility god Trimps, who was later split into two deities. Further researchers speculated that the name could be related to fertility ritual – stomping to scare away evil spirits and to wake the earth in spring.
