= Sudovian Book =

Historical document

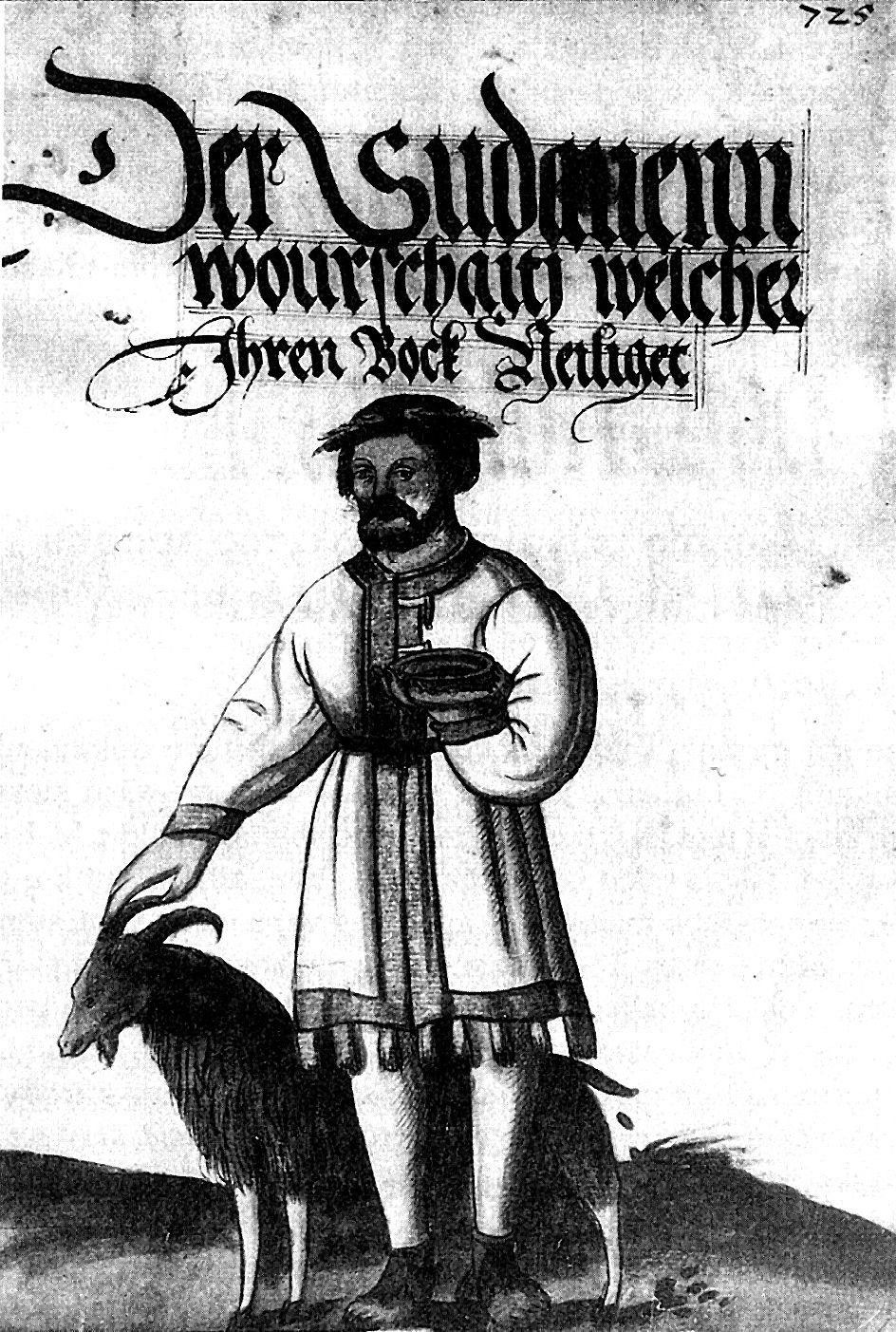
Illustration of goat sacrifice from the Sudovian Book

The so-called Sudovian Book (Note: The full title varied greatly between different copies of the manuscript. The title of the printed version is usually given as Warhafftige Beschreibung der Sudawen auf Samlandt sambt jhren Bockheyligen vnd Ceremonien (Truthful Description of Goat Sacrifice and Ceremonies by Sudovians from Samland). The manual copies were usually titled Der Vnglaubigen Sudauen ihrer Bockheiligung mit sambt andern Ceremonien, so sie tzu brauchen gepflegeth (The Goat Sacrifice by the Unbelieving Sudovians Along with Other Ceremonies which They Are in the Habit of Performing).) (German: Sudauer Büchlein, Lithuanian: Sūduvių knygelė) was an anonymous work about the customs, religion, and daily life of the Old Prussians from Sambia. The manuscript was written in German in the 16th century. The original did not survive and the book is known from later copies, transcriptions and publications.

Modern scholars disagree on the origin and value of the book. Despite doubts about its reliability, the book became popular and was frequently quoted in other history books. Much of (Old) Prussian mythology is reconstructed based on this work or its derivatives. It is known from Peter von Dusburg that 1,600 and 1,500 Sudovians were relocated to Sambia at the end of the 13th century. Their descendants still lived in the so-called Sudovian Corner and were known as determined believers in their pagan gods. Therefore, Norbertas Vėlius suggested that the work dealt not with Prussian, but with Sudovian gods and traditions.

== Authorship ==
According to the Polish scholar Aleksander Brückner, the book originated from letters written around 1545 by Protestant priest Hieronymus Malecki using information from Constitutiones Synodales published in 1530. The letters were expanded and translated by Malecki's son, who published the Sudovian Book in 1561. Therefore, it contained no new or valuable information and could not be considered an independent source of Prussian mythology.

The German philologist Wilhelm Mannhardt believed that Malecki only prepared a previously written, anonymous manuscript for publication. According to Mannhardt, the book predated and was used as a source for Constitutiones Synodales. He claimed that the book was written by Lutheran clergy – George of Polentz, Bishop of Sambia, Erhard of Queis, Bishop of Pomesania, and Paulus Speratus, preacher of Albert, Duke of Prussia, and later Bishop of Pomesania. During the 1520s, they visited different parishes, collected information about pagan beliefs, and memorialized the findings in the Sudovian Book, which was then summarized in the Constitutiones Synodales.

Lithuanian historian Ingė Lukšaitė claimed that both the Sudovian Book and Constitutiones Synodales were parts of a larger, more extensive work. She noted that these works were written in the Renaissance style, describing but not condemning pagan beliefs and rituals, which was improbable if the writers were Christian clergy seeking to eradicate paganism.

== Content ==
The book included a list of Prussian gods, sorted in a generally descending order from sky to earth to underworld: Ockopirmus (chief god of sky and stars), Swayxtix (god of light), Auschauts (god of the sick), Autrimpus (god of sea), Potrimpus (god of running water), Bardoayts (god of boats), Pergrubrius (god of plants), Pilnitis (god of abundance), Parkuns (god of thunder and rain), Peckols (god of hell and darkness), Pockols (flying spirit or devil), Puschkayts (god of earth) and his servants Barstucke (little people) and Markopole.

The book also discussed in detail traditional weddings, funerals, and honoring of the dead. In particular, the book described a ritual sacrifice of a goat by a priest (called Wourschaity) in great detail.
