= Percunatele =

Female deity

Perkunatete, Perkunatele or Perkūnėlė is in Baltic mythology the thunder goddess mother of Perkūnas, in Slavic mythology referred to as Percunatele mother of Perun, which is probably derived from the Balts. Like many such goddesses absorbed into Christianity, she is, today, difficult to distinguish from the Christian madonna, Mary, one of whose epithets was Panna Maria Percunatele. Professor Patricia Monaghan of DePaul University also believes that she was originally derived from the Baltic thunder goddess.

The character of Perkunatete seems to be present in the myths of Baltic sun goddess Saulė. This solar goddess, after her daily ride, bathes in a sauna to rest and recover her strength for another daily travel, with Perkunatete waiting on her. In the book of Georges Dumézil, it is described that Perkunatele was represented as an oak tree with a cleft, resembling the female genitals, where lightning hit. A fire could sometimes break out when the wood was not humid, bringing pain to her. This can be two things, passion that leads to the delivery of a child or a bad lover. If it was the first, laughter will come out of her uterus. If the former, Perkunatele would scream in agony. Its the classic myth of fertility that is present on many cultures, you have to satisfy your lover to bring harmony to the act of coitus. Unlike the Christian Madonna, Perkunatele was not immaculate. The name derivates from PIE *Perkwunos, cognate to *perkwus, a word for "oak", "fir" or "wooded mountain".
