= Widewuto =

Legendary Baltic Prussian king

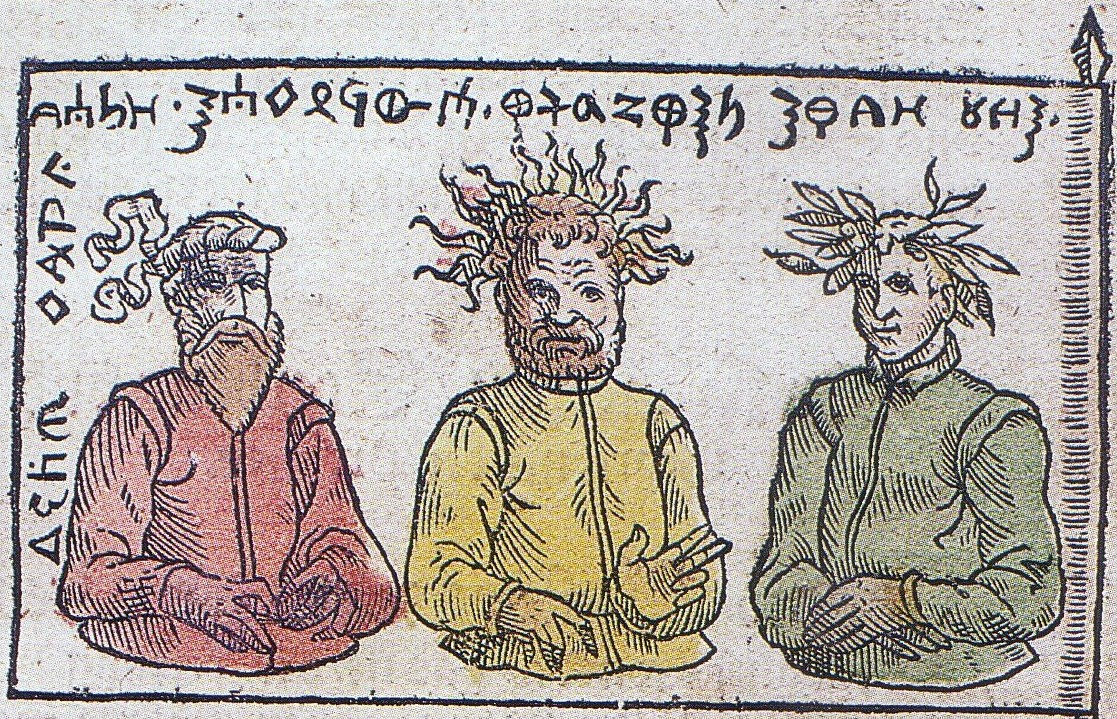
The purported flag of Widewuto

Widewuto or Videvutis (also Viduutus, Vidvutus, Witowudi, Waidewut, Vaidevutis) was a legendary king of the pagan Baltic Prussians who ruled along with his elder brother, the high priest (Kriwe-Kriwajto) Bruteno in the 6th century AD. They are known from writings of 16th-century chroniclers Erasmus Stella, Simon Grunau, and Lucas David. Though the legend lacks historical credibility, it became popular with medieval historians. It is unclear whether the legend was authentically Prussian (i.e. recorded from Prussian mythology) or was created by Grunau (possibly inspired by Biblical Moses and Aaron), though Lithuanian researchers tend to support its authenticity.

== Names ==
Widewuto's name is found in literature in different forms: Veijdenutus, Vydevutis, Vidowuto, Viduutus, Waidewut, Wejdewut, Wenedut, Widewuto, Widewutte, Widiwutus, Wydowudo, Wydowudus, Widowuto, Wydowuto, Widowutus, Witoud, Witoudo, Witouito, Witowudus, Witowuto, Wotowudo, Vaidevutis (modern Lithuanian emendation). As for his brother Bruteno, his name is also written in many ways: Brudeno, Bruteno, Brutenus, Brutheno, Brutteno. Belarusian scholar Siarhiej Sanko interprets their names as "Widow's Son" and "Brother".

== Legends ==
According to the legend, Widewuto and Bruteno were kings of the Cimbri, a tribe in Jutland. Driven out by the Goths from their homeland, the Cimbri arrived to Ulmiganea, an area inhabited by rather primitive people who had no agriculture or cities. Widewuto and Bruteno civilized the region and named it Prussia after Bruteno (Pruteno). Gintaras Beresnevičius noted that such arrival has a lot in common with the origin legend of the Lombards. Widewuto ruled wisely and issued laws regulating family life (for example, men could have three wives; burning of gravely sick relatives was allowed; infidelity was punished by death), public life (for example, slavery was prohibited; distinguished warriors with a horse were raised to nobility), and punishments for criminal activity. Bruteno was the high priest (Kriwe-Kriwajto) in charge of religious life. Widewuto had twelve sons, whose names were memorialized in the districts of Prussia. For example, Lithuania was named after eldest son Litvas, Sudovia after Sudo, etc. Aged 116, Widewuto burned himself together with Bruteno in a religious ceremony at the temple of Romuva. After their deaths the brothers were worshiped as god Wurskaito.

== Flag ==
Widewuto had a white flag, measuring five by three ells. The flag had portraits of three Prussian gods, which Grunau reproduced in his work. On the left, there was the god of the underworld, Peckols – an old man with white beard and white scarf on his head. Middle-aged and fiery-haired Perkūnas, god of sky, storm, and thunder, was in the middle. The god of sea, earth, and crops, Patrimpas, was portrayed as a young beardless man wearing a wreath of grain ears. The flag also displayed mysterious symbols. Several linguists have unsuccessfully attempted to decipher the writing hoping to discover an ancient Prussian writing system.
