= Perkūnas =

Baltic god of thunder

Perkūnas Pērkons
- Member of triune godhead including Potrimpo and Peckols (allegedly)
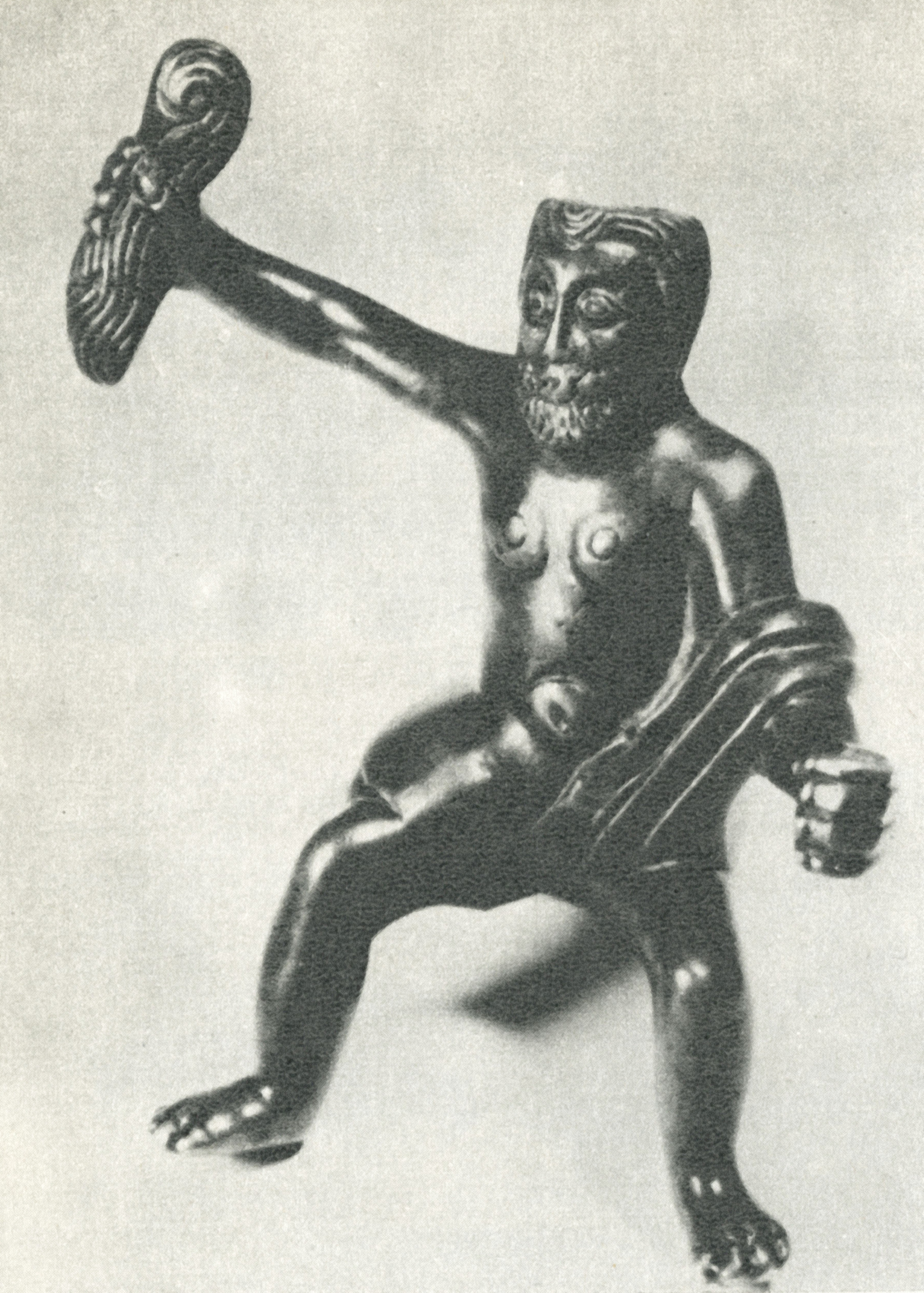
- Statue possibly depicting Perkūnas
- Affiliation: Sky, thunder, lightning, storms, rain, fire, war, law, order, fertility, mountains, and oak trees
- Major cult center: Romuva (allegedly); Vilnius temple (1263-1387)
- Weapon: Axe or sledgehammer, stones, a sword, lightning bolts, a bow and arrows.
- Symbol: Swastika
- Tree: Oak, Rowan
- Day: Thursday
- Color: Red, White

Genealogy
- Parents: Percunatele (mother)
- Consort: Aušra, Žemyna or Laumė

Equivalents
- Celtic: Taranis
- Indo-European: *Perkʷūnos
- Norse: Thor
- Slavic: Perun
- Finnic: Ukko

Perkūnas (Lithuanian: Perkūnas, Latvian: Pērkons, Prussian: Perkūns, Perkunos, Sudovian: Parkuns, Latgalian: Pārkiuņs) was the common Baltic god of thunder, and the second most important deity in the Baltic pantheon after Dievas. In both Lithuanian and Latvian mythology, he is documented as the god of sky, thunder, lightning, storms, rain, fire, war, law, order, fertility, mountains, and oak trees.

== Etymology ==
The name of the god is attested as Lithuanian Perkū́nas, Latvian Pērkons, Sudovian Pjarkus. There are also homonymous or similar-sounding words meaning "thunder": Lithuanian perkū́nas, Latvian pērkūns, pērkuons, pērkauns, Old Prussian percunis.

The etymology of Perkunas is unclear. Wojciech Smoczyński (2025), analyzing the etymology of the appellative perkū́nas, concludes that the word has no established Baltic etymology. There are several hypotheses about the origin of the word.

=== Proto-Indo-European god *Perkʷúh₃nos ===
Some Indo-Europeanists, such as James Mallory and Douglas Q. Adams, and historians of religion, such as Peter Jackson (in consultation with Indo-Europeanist Norbert Oettinger), are attempting to reconstruct the Proto-Indo-European god of thunder named *Perkʷúh₃nos using comparative linguistics. The main linguistic evidence is said to be the Baltic god of thunder Perkun, the Slavic god of thunder Perun, Fjörgyn, mother of Thor, god of thunder in Norse mythology, and, possibly, Parjanya, the Vedic god of rain and storm, the Albanian god of weather Perëndi, and Hittite perunaš "stone". This theonym is said to derive from the root *per- "to beat" or from root *perkʷ- "oak", and the theonym itself was later given various extensions in different languages. Therefore, the theonym can be literally translated as "the Striker" or "the Lord of Oaks".

Jackson points out that it is impossible to create a single, common protoform from the listed theonyms, and that at least three should be created, but based on the similarity between Perkunas and Fjörgyn, he concludes that *Perkʷúh₃nos is an early formation. According to linguist Guus Kroonen, Proto-Germanic *fergunją "mountain" or "mountainous forest" (from which the goddess's epithet derives) may be related to *ferhwaz "oak" and *furhwǭ "fir", or arose in Germanic and is the feminine form of the word *fergaz "god" (feminine protoform: *perk⁽ʷ⁾-n-yeh₂-), which excludes any connection with Perkunas. Linguist Riccardo Ginevra notes that Fjörgyn herself has no connection with lightning, and derives her name from the root *perḱ- "variegated", "black". The Germanic word itself is often considered a loan from Celtic. The suggested connection with Perun is also criticized. If the Slavic form corresponded to the Baltic one, it would sound like **Perkynъ: the Baltic *ū regularly gives the Slavic *y, and the Slavic form lacks the element -k-. Aleksander Brückner attempted to resolve this problem by explaining that -k- disappeared under the influence of the verb *pьràti "to beat", and *y changed to *u as an analogy to nouns such as *běgunъ "runner". Linguist Norbert Ostrowski rejects Brückner's idea as impossible to prove; linguist Mikołaj Rudnicki stated that such an omission of the middle -k- would be a completely isolated phenomenon. Linguist Michał Łuczyński points out that Baltic and Germanic forms differ in their suffixes, Vedic and Hittite forms have different etymologies, the Albanian theonym arose in Albanian, and the PIE the palatalized -kʷ- does not disappear and regularly changes to -k- in the Proto-Slavic language, as a result of which the Slavic Perun cannot continue PIE *Perkʷúh₃nos. He states that the reconstruction of the Proto-Indo-European god *Perkʷúh₃nos ~ *Perownos ~ *Perwṇtos is unfounded due to the lack of linguistic material allowing for such reconstructions, and concludes that there is no common Indo-European name for the god of thunder; Philologist Martin L. West also rejects the possibility of reconstructing the name of the Indo-European god of thunder: Perkunas, Perun, and Parjanya contain different roots with different meanings and have different formants, which means that these theonyms arose independently of each other.

=== From *perkʷ- "oak" ===
It has also been suggested that Perkun is derived from the Proto-Indo-European root *perkʷ- "oak".

Ostrowski, discussing the Baltic appellative, reconstructs the following paradigm of the protoform:

- Nominative: *pérku-Hō(n) "having an oak tree"
- Genitive: *perku-Hn-és (instead of expected *pr̥ku-Hn-és as a result of leveling within the paradigm)

According to him, the older form is Latvian pērkuons, which he derives from the e-grade (nominative), and Lithuanian perkū́nas and Latvian dialectal pērkūns from the zero-grade (genitive). The suffix *-Hō(n) itself forms possessive adjectives, and he compares perkū́nas to Lithuanian jáunas "young" < *h₂yéwh₁n-o-s "having strength" < *h₂yéw- "strength".

=== From *per- "to hit" ===
Linguist Ernst Fraenkel rejected the etymological connection between Perkunas and oak. Instead, he adopted an etymology linking it to the verb per̃ti "to beat, to whip", "to strike (about lightning)" (Proto-Balto-Slavic *pertei). Perkun and Perun would have been formed analogously. To explain -k-, he states that Perkun was extended by a voiceless velar plosive and compares it to the Vedic Parjanya, whose name was extended by a voiced velar plosive. Smoczyński considers this explanation doubtful.

To explain -k-, linguist Jan Otrębski reconstructs the verb *per-k(er)- with the inserted root *ker- "to cut" (cf. Ancient Greek keírō "to cut off", Lithuanian kir̃sti "to chop, to cut down").

Ostrowski criticizes this etymology. He notes that the suffix -unas with acute intonation (-ū́nas) only appears in the function of forming patronymic names, and that there is no evidence to consider the word perkū́nas a patronymic name. This suffix with a circumflex accent (-ū̃nas) can form nomen agentis or nomina attributiva, but the accent of this suffix does not match the word in question.

=== Slavic borrowing ===
Smoczyński considers the suffix -unas to be of Rus' origin, which indicates the possibility of borrowing. Smoczyński suggests that the basic form is the dialectal (eastern) word perū́nas "lightning", which is borrowed from Middle Belarusian perun "lightning". The word was then extended with -k- and borrowed into other Baltic languages. He points out that there are also proper names corresponding to this word: lake Perū̃nas and two placenames Perū̃nai (in the plural).

== Perkūnas in written sources ==
Most information about Perkūnas comes from folklore songs, legends, and fairy tales. Because most of them were collected rather late in the 19th century, they represent only some fragments of the whole mythology. Lithuanian Perkūnas has many alternative onomatopoeic names, like Dundulis, Dindutis, Dūdų senis, Tarškulis, Tarškutis, Blizgulis, etc.

The earliest attestation of Perkūnas seems to be in the Ruthenian translation of the Chronicle of John Malalas (1261) where it speaks about the worship of "Перкоунови рекше громоу", and in the Livonian Rhymed Chronicle (around 1290) which mentions the idol Perkūnė.

In the Constitutiones Synodales (1530) Perkūnas is mentioned in a list of gods before the god of hell Pikuls and is identified with the Roman Jove (Jupiter). In the Sudovian Book Perkūnas (Parkuns) is mentioned in connection with a ritual involving a goat. In Christian compositions, Perkūnas is a malicious spirit, a demon, as in the Chronicle of John Malalas or in the 15th century writings of Polish chronicler Jan Długosz.

== Representation in mythology ==
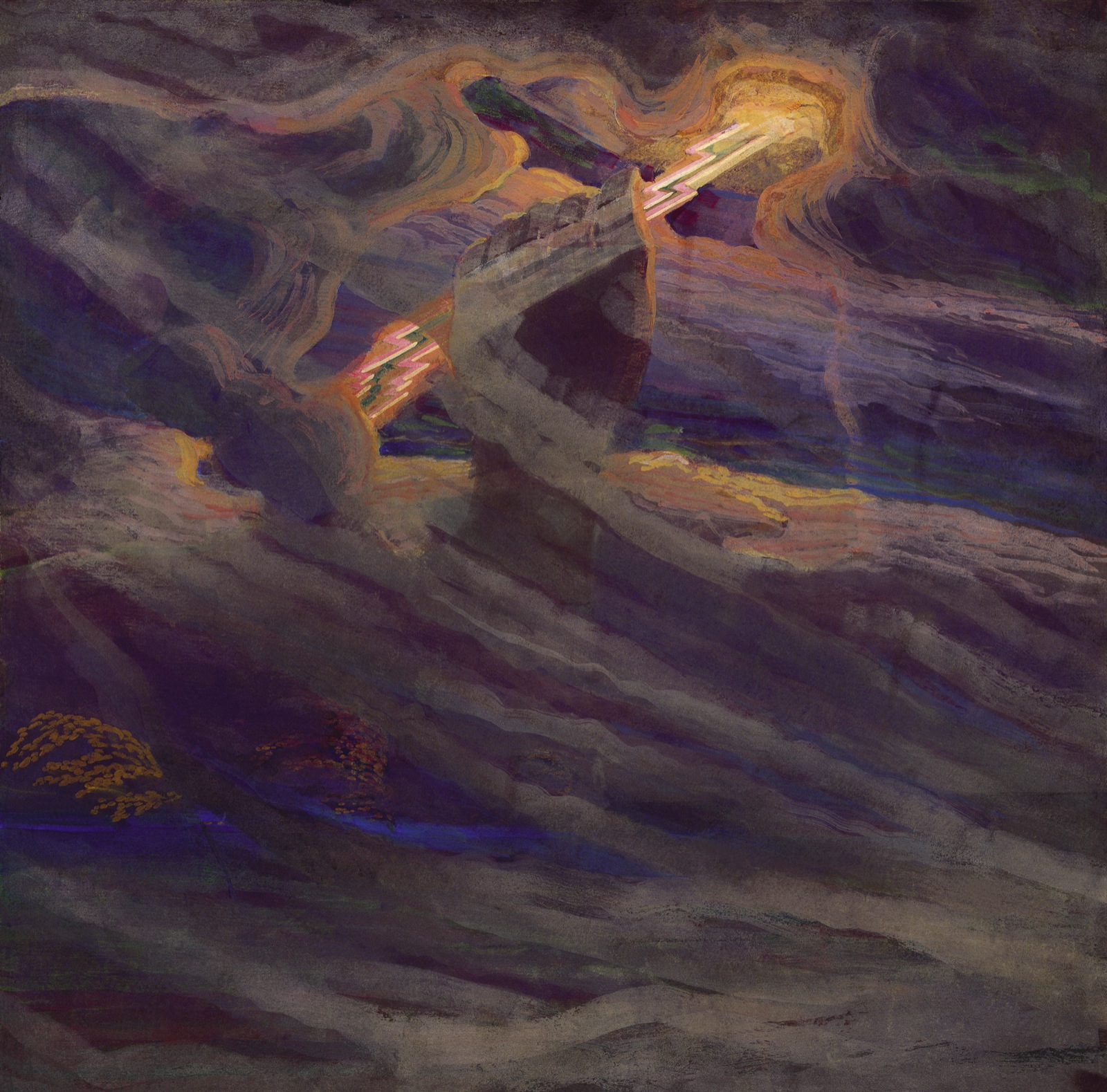
The Hand of Perkūnas by Mikalojus Konstantinas Čiurlionis

Perkūnas is the god of lightning and thunder and storms. In a triad of gods Perkūnas symbolizes the creative forces (including vegetative), courage, success, the top of the world, the sky, rain, thunder, heavenly fire (lightning) and celestial elements.

In the Latvian dainas, the functions of Pērkons and Dievs can occasionally merge: Pērkons is called Pērkona tēvs ('Father or God of Thunder') or Dieviņš, a diminutive form of Dievs.

=== Weapons and vehicle ===
Perkūnas is pictured as middle-aged, armed with an axe and arrows, riding a two-wheeled chariot harnessed with goats, like Thor or Celtic Taranis.

In other accounts, the thunder god is described as driving a fiery chariot through the skies with swift horses, or riding a fiery horse.

=== Perkūnas' family relations ===
In songs about a "heavenly wedding" Saulė (the Sun) cheats on Perkūnas with Mėnulis (the Moon); Perkūnas splits Mėnulis in half with a sword. According to another, more popular, version, Mėnulis cheats on the Sun with Aušrinė (the morning star) just after the wedding, and Perkūnas punishes it. However, it does not learn and repeats the adultery and is punished again every month. Other explanations say it is why the Sun shines during the day and the Moon at night. Though divorced, both want to see their daughter Žemyna (the Earth).

In other songs Perkūnas, on the way to the wedding of Aušra (dawn; the daughter of the Sun), strikes a golden oak. The oak is a tree of the thunder god in the Baltic mythology. References to the "oak of Perkūnas" (in Lithuanian, Perkūno ąžuolas; in Latvian, Pērkona ozols) exist in a source dated to the first half of the 19th century.

Other myths say that Perkūnas and one Laumė by the name of Vaiva (rainbow) were supposed to get married on Thursday, but the bride was kidnapped by Velnias (the devil) and Perkūnas has hunted Velnias ever since.

Some myths mention four sons of Perkūnas (Latvian: Perkona dēli; Lithuanian: Perkūno sūnūs), who, apparently, are connected with the four seasons or with the four directions of the world (east, west, south and north). Sometimes there are seven or nine Perkūnai referred to as brothers. It is said in Lithuanian "Perkūnų yra daug" ("there are many thunders").

In some myths Perkūnas expels his wife (and in some cases his children too) and remains in the sky by himself. Some myths offer a very different story: Dievas lifts Perkūnas from the earth into the sky. Perkūnas has stones in the sky (which rumble during storms) - the motive connected to Indo-European mythology. Perkūnas dwells on high hills or mountains: compare Lithuanian toponymy of Perkūnkalnis, "mountain of Perkūnas", or Griausmo kalnas, "mountain of rumble."

In most myths, however, Perkūnas's wife is Žemyna.

=== Perkūnas and Velnias ===
An important function of Perkūnas is to fight Velnias (in Latvian, Velns). He is sometimes considered the antithesis of Perkūnas and is the god of the underworld and death. Christianity considers "Velnias" akin to their "devil", though this is not in line with ancient beliefs.

Perkūnas pursues his opponent, Velns, for his theft of fertility and cattle. Velnias hides in trees, under stones, or turns into various animals: a black cat, dog, pig, goat, lamb, pike, cow (compare to the Latvian representations of jods, a creature with cow hoofs) or a person.

Perkūnas pursues an opponent in the sky on a chariot, made from stone and fire (Lithuanian ugnies ratai). Sometimes the chariot is made from red iron. It is harnessed by a pair (less often four or three) of red and white (or black and white) horses (sometimes goats). Compare the Lithuanian deity of horses and chariots Ratainyčia (Ratainicza mentioned in Lasick's works; from Lithuanian ratai - "wheel"). It is a mythologized image of a chariot of Didieji Grįžulo Ratai ("Grand Wheels of Grįžulas" (Ursa Major). It agrees with Samogitian representations, in which Perkūnas is a horseman on a fiery horse. On his heavenly chariot Perkūnas appears in the shape of a gray-haired old man with a big beard of many colors, in white and black clothes, holding a goat on a cord in one hand and a horn or an axe in the other.

Perkūnas possesses many weapons. They include an axe or sledgehammer, stones, a sword, lightning bolts, a bow and arrows, a club, and an iron or fiery knife. Perkūnas is portrayed as a creator of weapons (Akmeninis kalvis, "the stone smith") although he may also be helped by the heavenly smith Televelis (Kalvelis).

An opponent of Perkūnas hides itself in the hollow of a tree or a stone (attributes of Perkūnas). The culmination of Perkūnas' hunt for his opponent is a thunder-storm; it not only clears the ground of evil spirits, but returns the stolen cattle or weapons.

Perkūnas is also connected to Thursday. Thursday is the day of the Thunderer in many traditions: compare Polabian Peräune-dǻn ("day of Perun"), Lithuanian Perkūno diena. Perkūnas is associated with the Roman god Jupiter in early sources. Thursday is a day of thunder-storms and rains, and also of weddings.

== Prussian Perkūns ==
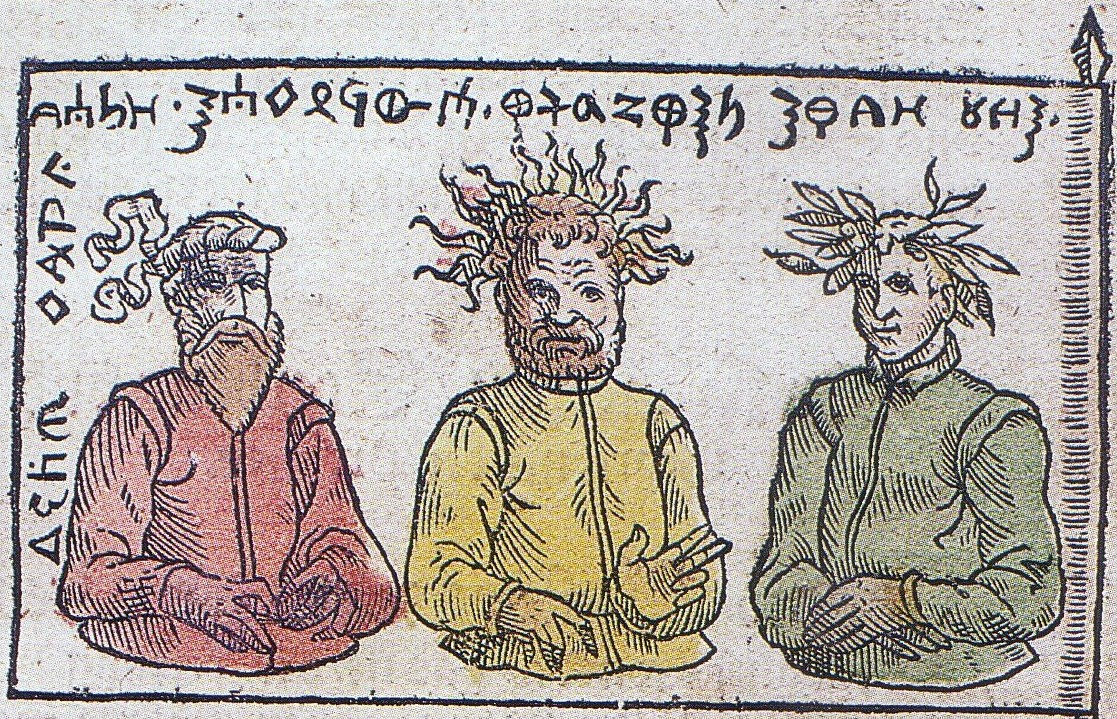
The so-called Flag of Widewuto introduced by Grunau featuring Prussian Perkūns (in the middle)

Simon Grunau (around 1520) describes a Prussian banner with Perkūns on it. The god is represented as an angry middle aged man with a twisted black beard, topped with a flame. It stands between young Patrimpas and old Patulas. Perkūns maintains the same central position in the description of the sacred oak in Romowe sanctuary. In front of the oak, the eternal fire (symbol of Perkūns) was burned. Special priests served at the sanctuary. Old Prussians would try to appeal to the god by prayers. Perkunatete was the mother of Perkūns.

== Latvian Pērkons ==
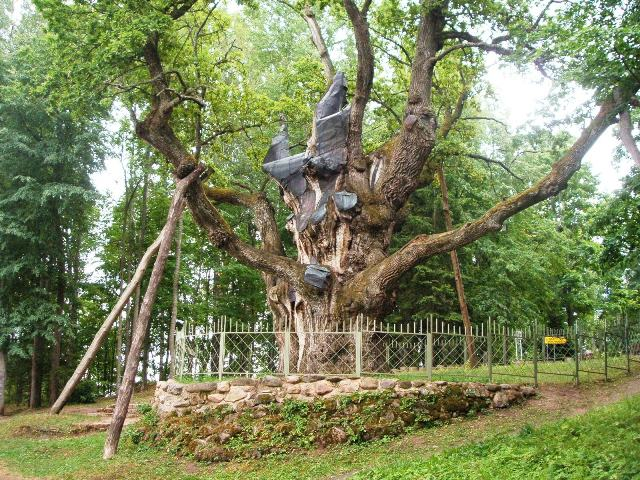
According to legend, Perkūnas was worshiped beneath the over 1500-year-old Stelmužė Oak

Pērkons was strongly associated with Dievs, though the two were clearly different. The people sacrificed black calves, goats, and roosters to Pērkons, especially during droughts. The surrounding peoples came to these sacrifices to eat and drink together, after pouring beer onto the ground or into the fire for him. The Latvians also sacrificed cooked food before meals to Pērkons, in order to prevent thunderstorms, during which honeycombs were placed into fires to disperse the clouds.

Pērkons' family included sons that symbolized various aspects of thunderstorms (such as thunder, lightning, lightning strikes) and daughters that symbolized various kinds of rain.

Pērkons appeared on a golden horse, wielding a sword, iron club, golden whip and a knife. Ancient Latvians wore tiny axes on their clothing in his honor.

== In modern culture ==
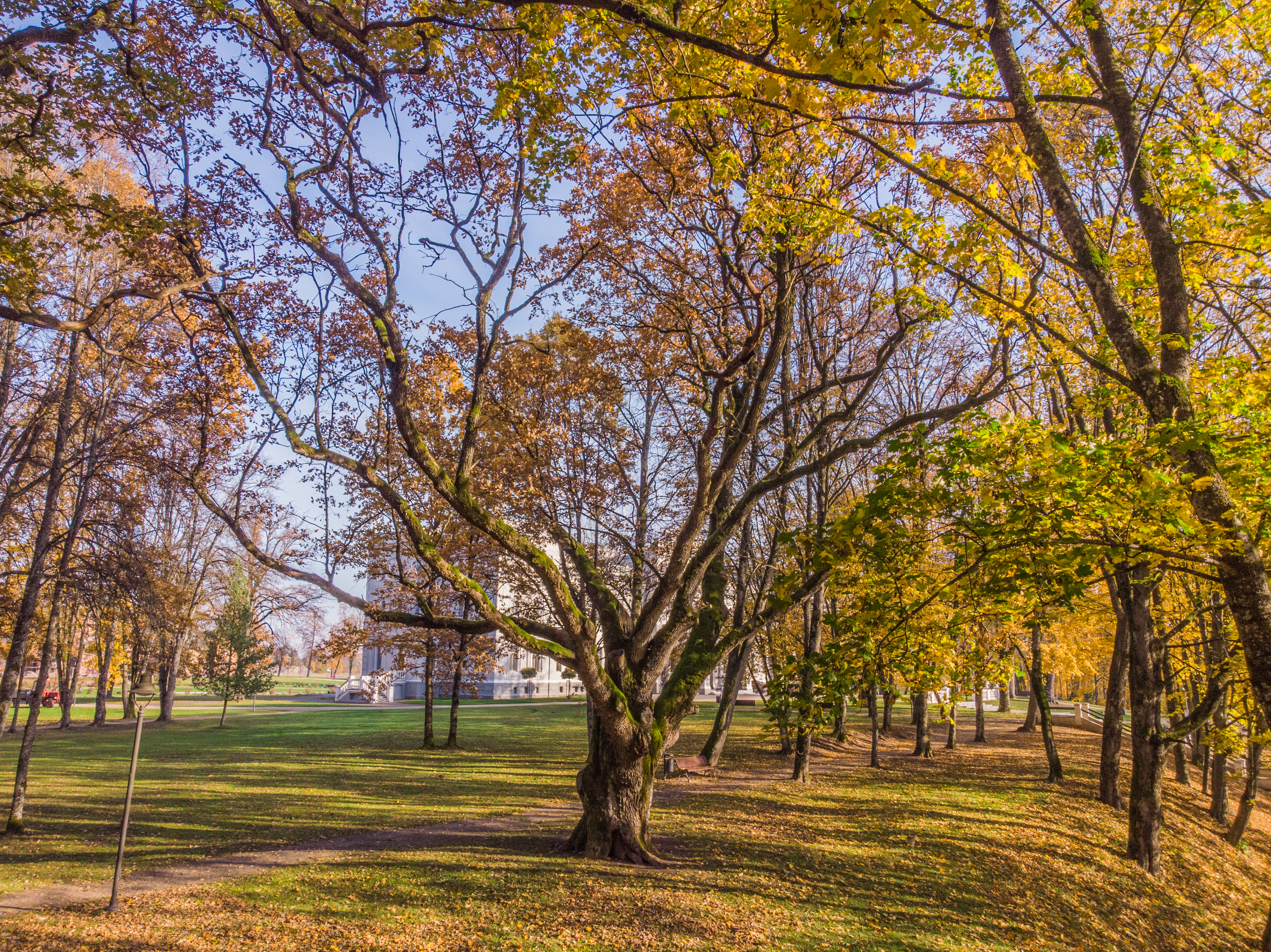
Perkūnas Oak (~500-800 years old) in Plungė, Lithuania

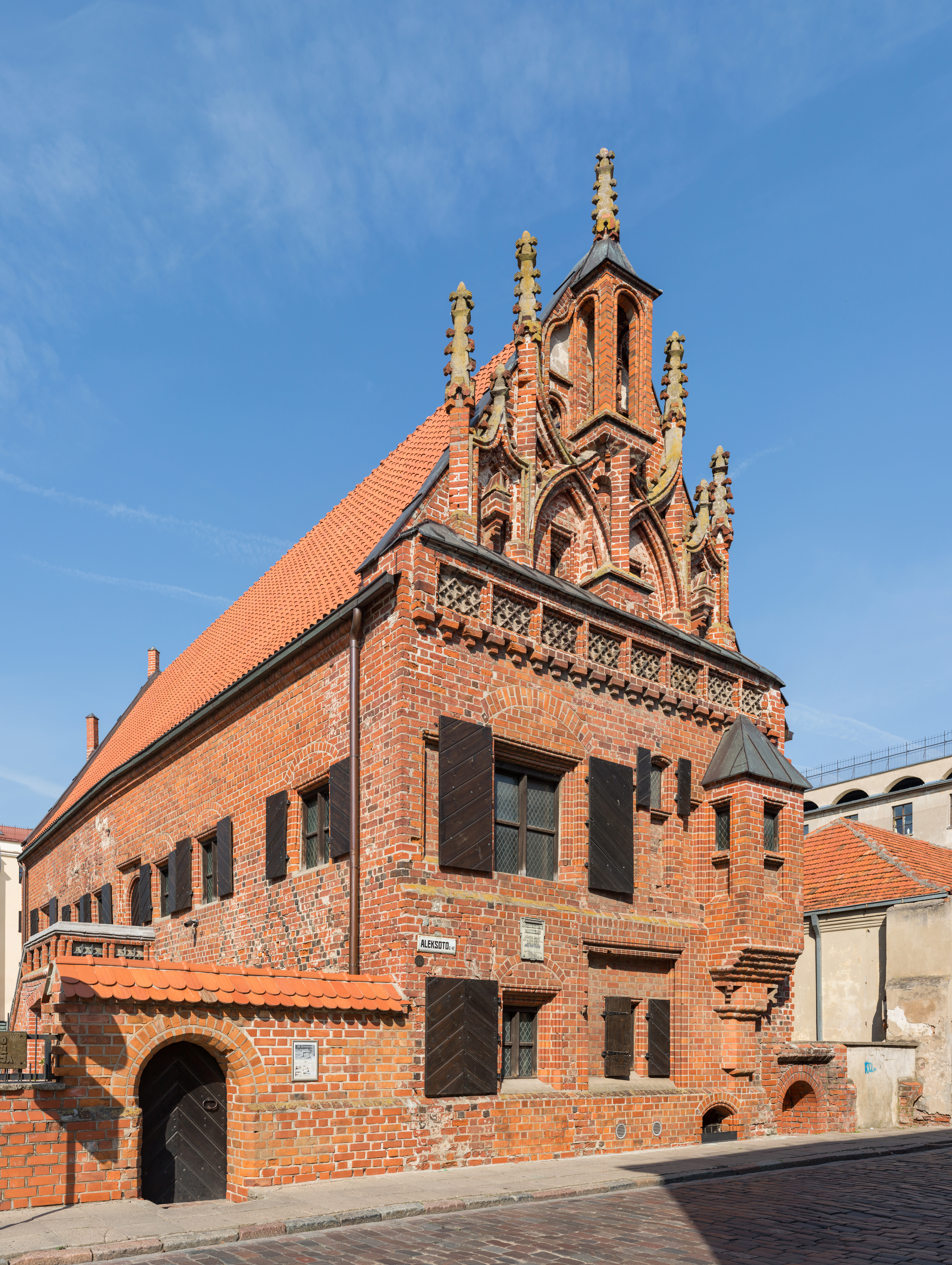
The House of Perkūnas in Kaunas, Lithuania; it was named at the end of the 19th century when a figure, interpreted as an idol of Perkūnas, was found in one of its walls

Günter Grass, in his second novel Dog Years (1963), alludes to Perkūnas ("Perkunos") as a symbol of the dark human energies unleashed by the rise of Nazism in Germany in the 1930s.

The fictional parallel to Nazi Germany in the 1966 alternate history novel The Gate of Time by Philip José Farmer - located physically on the site of present-day Germany, but dominated by Lithuanians rather than Germans - is called Perkunisha, named after Perkūnas.

Two other alternate history timelines feature a Perkūnas-worshipping Lithuania surviving into the 20th Century, out of diametrically opposing points of divergence. In Poul Anderson's "Delenda Est" (1955), the alternate Lithuania arose in a history where Carthage had defeated and destroyed Rome and there was no Roman Empire. Conversely, in Harry Turtledove's Gunpowder Empire (2003), the Roman Empire survived into the 20th Century and beyond, and "Lietuva" emerged as a rival empire to its north. Perkunas is also mentioned in Turtledove's novel in The Case of the Toxic Spell Dump (1993).

The Lithuanian folk music group Kūlgrinda released a 2003 album titled Perkūno Giesmės, meaning "Hymns of Perkūnas".

Saule, Pērkons, Daugava is a Latvian choir song composed by Mārtiņš Brauns, based on a 1916 poem by Rainis.

Erica Synths made a drum synthesizer named Perkons.

In August 2023 a totem pole carved with the writing "Perkunas 2023" appeared above the White Cliffs of Dover in the South of England, UK. To date no one has claimed ownership of the piece and the public are still no wiser as to how it got there.

== See also ==
- Hercynian Forest
- House of Perkūnas
- Indra
- Perkwunos
- Perun
- Thunaer
- List of Lithuanian gods and mythological figures

== Bibliography ==
- Smoczyński, Wojciech (2025). "perkū́nas". Słownik etymologiczny języka litewskiego (in Polish) (2 ed.). Kraków.
- Otrębski, Jan (1962). "Zwei Etymologien". Die Sprache (in German). 8 (1). Wiedeń: 63–65.
- Mallory, James; Adams, Douglas Q. (2006). The Oxford Introduction to Proto-Indo-European and the Proto-Indo-European World. Oxford University Press. ISBN 978-0-19-929668-2.
- Jackson, Peter (2002). "Light from Distant Asterisks. Towards a Description of the Indo-European Religious Heritage". Numen. 49 (1): 61–102. doi:10.1163/15685270252772777. ISSN 0029-5973.
- Kroonen, Guus (2013). "*fergunja-". Etymological Dictionary of Proto-Germanic. Leiden Indo-European Etymological Dictionary Series. Leiden, Boston: Brill. ISBN 978-90-04-18340-7.
- Ginevra, Riccardo (2021). "Old Norse -yn (Proto-Germanic *-unjō-) and the re-analysis and spread of derivational morphology through semantic association". Dérivation nominale et innovations dans les langues indo-européennes anciennes. Alain Blanc, Isabelle Boehm (red.). Lyon: MOM Éditions. pp. 61–72. doi:10.4000/books.momeditions.11087. ISBN 978-2-35668-169-0.
- Orel, Vladimir (2003). "*ferʒ(w)unjan ~ *ferʒ(w)unjō". A handbook of germanic etymology. Leiden, Boston: Brill. ISBN 9789004128750.
- Ostrowski, Norbert (2011). "Lit. perkūnas 'piorun; grzmot' – próba weryfikacji etymologii". Pruthenia. VI. Olsztyn: 275–280. ISSN 1897-0915.
- Brückner, Aleksander (1922). "Osteuropäische Götternamen. Ein Beitrag zur Vergleichenden Mythologi". Zeitschrift für Vergleichende Sprachforschung auf dem Gebiete der Indogermanischen Sprachen. 50 (3/4): 161–197. JSTOR 40847373.
- Brückner, Aleksander (1927). "piorun" . Słownik etymologiczny języka polskiego. Warszawa: Wiedza Powszechna.
- Łuczyński, Michał (2020). Bogowie dawnych Słowian. Studium onomastyczne (in Polish). Kielce: Kieleckie Towarzystwo Naukowe. ISBN 9788360777831.
- Fraenkel, Ernst (1962). "perkū́nas". Litauisches etymologisches Wörterbuch. Vol. 1 A – privekiúoti. Heidelberg: Carl Winter Universitätsverlag.
- West, Martin L. (2007). Indo-European Poetry and Myth. Oxford University Press. ISBN 978-0-19-928075-9.
- Zinkevičius, Zigmas (1985). "Lenkų-jotvingių žodynėlis?". Baltistica (in Lithuanian). 21 (1).
