= Jan Otrębski =

Polish dialectologist

- Born: Jan Szczepan Otrębski; 8 December 1889; Pilica, Kielce Governorate, Congress Poland
- Died: 26 April 1971 (aged 81); Poznań, Poland
- Resting place: Puszczykowo, Poznań County, Poland
- Occupations: Linguist, scholar
- Notable work: Gramatyka języka litewskiego

Jan Szczepan Otrębski (Note: Polish pronunciation: [ˈjan ɔtrɛ̃bski]) (8 December 1889 – 26 April 1971) was a Polish philologist, linguist, and author of 350 scientific papers in the field of Slavic and Baltic studies. He is particularly noted for his study of the Lithuanian language. He held the Chair of Baltic Philology in the Adam Mickiewicz University in Poznań and was the founder of the Lingua Posnaniensis journal. His three-volume work Gramatyka języka litewskiego (Grammar of Contemporary Lithuanian) is considered his magnum opus.

== Early life ==
Otrębski was born on 8 December 1889, to a family of intellectuals in Pilica, in the Kielce Governorate of Congress Poland. He studied at the University of Warsaw, where he met Yefemiy Karski who was the supervisor of his first thesis, "Description of Byelorussian Dialects in Vilnius Province". During his work on this thesis he first came into contact with the Lithuanian language. The work received a gold medal, and Otrębski was titled "Primus Inter Pares".

In 1914 he studied for his doctorate at Leipzig University, and managed to complete his doctoral dissertation in comparative linguistics by early 1915. However, the outbreak of World War I prevented him from completing his education. He was interned, and worked for a time in a German brick factory. Later during the war he moved to Kalisz, where he worked as a teacher. When the war ended, Otrębski submitted his doctoral thesis, titled "Przyczynki do gramatyki porównawczej języków indoeuropejskich" ("Contributions to a Comparative Grammar of the Indo-European Languages"), to Professor Jan Michał Rozwadowski at Jagiellonian University, and he defended the dissertation in 1920.

== Career ==
After receiving his doctorate, Otrębski became associated with the Stefan Batory University, becoming a professor and heading its Department of Indo-European Studies. He studied the Lithuanian dialect in Tverečius between 1928 and 1934. During World War II he was at Vilnius University. According to Otrębski's article published in 1931, the Polish dialect in the Vilnius Region and in the northeastern areas in general are very interesting variant of Polishness as this dialect developed in a foreign territory which was mostly inhabited by the Lithuanians who were Belarusized (mostly) or Polonized, and to prove this Otrębski provided examples of Lithuanianisms in the Tutejszy language. After the war he moved to Poznań, founding in 1947 the Chair of Baltic Philology at the Adam Mickiewicz University in Poznań.

Otrębski authored 350 scientific papers in the field of Slavic and Baltic studies, of which more than 100 were devoted to the study of the Lithuanian language. He founded the Lingua Posnaniensis journal, published by the Poznań Society of Friends of Learning. His three-volume work titled Gramatyka języka litewskiego (Grammar of Contemporary Lithuanian) is considered his magnum opus.

== Death and legacy ==
Otrębski died on 26 April 1971 in Poznań, where he was buried.

Though Otrębski had been born in Pilica in southern Poland, which was unrelated to Lithuania, and first encountered Lithuanian as an adult, he devoted much of his adult life to the study of the Lithuanian language. In Lithuania, he is respected, as on the 125th anniversary of his birth, his memory was honored in a scientific conference held in the Seimas in 2014.
