= Romuva (temple) =

Alleged pagan temple in Prussia

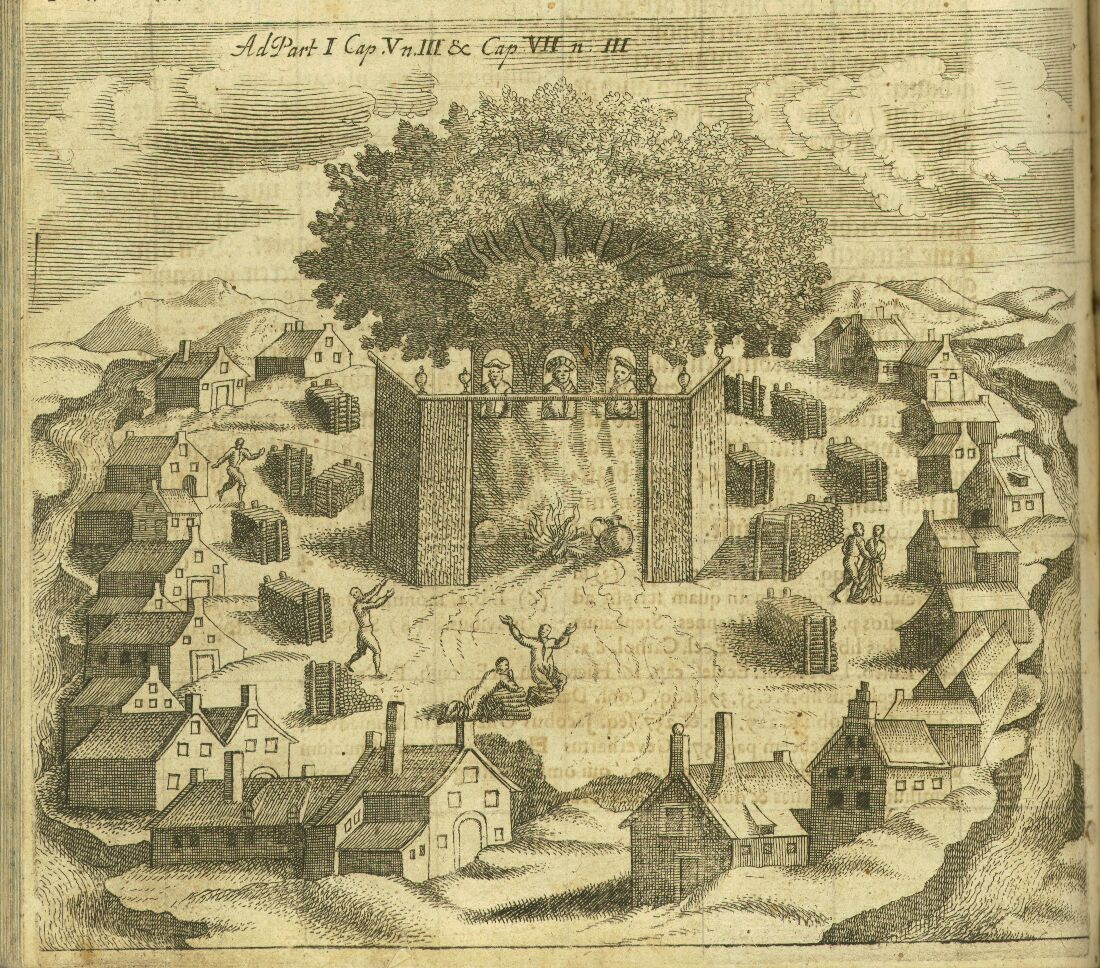
Romuva sanctuary in Prussia: a depiction based on the 16th-century account of Simon Grunau

Romuva or Romowe (also known as Rickoyoto in the writings of Simon Grunau) was an alleged pagan place of worship (a temple or a sacred area) in the western part of Sambia, one of the regions of pagan Prussia. In contemporary sources the temple is mentioned only once, by Peter von Dusburg in 1326. According to his account, Kriwe-Kriwajto, the chief priest or "pagan pope", lived at Romuva and ruled over the religion of all the Balts. According to Simon Grunau, the temple was central to Prussian mythology. Even though there are considerable doubts whether such a place actually existed, the Lithuanian neo-pagan movement Romuva borrowed its name from the temple.

== Historical accounts ==
According to Peter von Dusburg, writing in 1326, the name Romuva is derived from the word Rome. He describes the Kriwe as a powerful priest who was held in high regard by the Prussians, Lithuanians, and Balts of Livonia. His messengers were recognized by a certain rod or other insignia. He guarded the sacred flame and could look into the destiny of deceased followers. He received one third of any booty taken by pagan warriors.

This early account was further enhanced by Simon Grunau in the 16th century. He described an eternal sacred fire, an eternally green oak with idols representing a pagan "trinity": Patrimpas (god of spring), Perkūnas (god of thunder) and Patulas (god of the underworld). The place was guarded by priests and vestales. Images appeared based on this description and became very popular with romantic historians. Grunau changed the name for the place to Rickoyoto (from Prussian rikijs - ruler and -ote - a place name ending) and invented the term "Kriwe of Kriwes" (Lithuanian: krivių krivaitis, Latvian: krīvu krīvs).

However, no other sources support such statements. The descriptions suggest that the pagan cult had hierarchy and internal organization, which is known not to be true. If the Kriwe were such an influential person, he would have been mentioned in some political accounts of the region. The supposed location has never been found either by the Teutonic Knights, who controlled the whole of Nadruvia, or by modern archaeologists. Some details in the descriptions have similarities with other sources. For example, the Treaty of Christburg prohibits converted Prussians from having Tulissones vel Ligaschones at funerals to see into the journey of the deceased's soul. Another document by the Teutonic Knights speaks of the blûtekirl who collected a third of the booty from Samogitian warriors as an offering to the gods.

== Interpretations ==
Since the concept of a "pagan pope" became very popular during the times of romantic nationalism and very little is actually known about the temple, interpretations abound. S. C. Rowell suggests that Peter von Dusburg invented the place to make the Baltic religion appear like a "counter-church". There are many similarities between Romuva and the Christian church: in a place called after Rome lived a man treated like a pope with his own messengers and insignia. Such an account could have served several purposes: to demonstrate that pagans are so well organized that they have their own pope and pose a serious threat, to shame Christians into respecting their own pope, or to make pagan society easier to understand to a Christian reader.

Romuva might have been a sacred place, known as an alkas, which were common among Balts. Peter von Dusburg might have exaggerated its importance. There have been attempts to link the Kriwe with Lizdeika, a semi-legendary pagan priest and advisor to Grand Duke Gediminas. Marceli Kosman, a modern Polish historian, called Lizdeika the last Kriwe. Vladimir Toporov argued that the Crooked Castle (castrum curvum) in Vilnius was really Kriwe Castle.

The word may be derived from the Baltic root ram-/rām-, meaning 'calm, serene, quiet', stemming from the Proto-Indo-European *(e)remǝ-. The word Kriwe is derived from kreivas (crooked). It is believed that the term derives from a crooked stick (krivulė in Lithuanian) that according to Peter von Dusburg was the most important symbol of his power.

== See also ==
- Hercynian Forest
- Lithuanian mythology
- Romuva (religion)
