= Caspar Hennenberger =

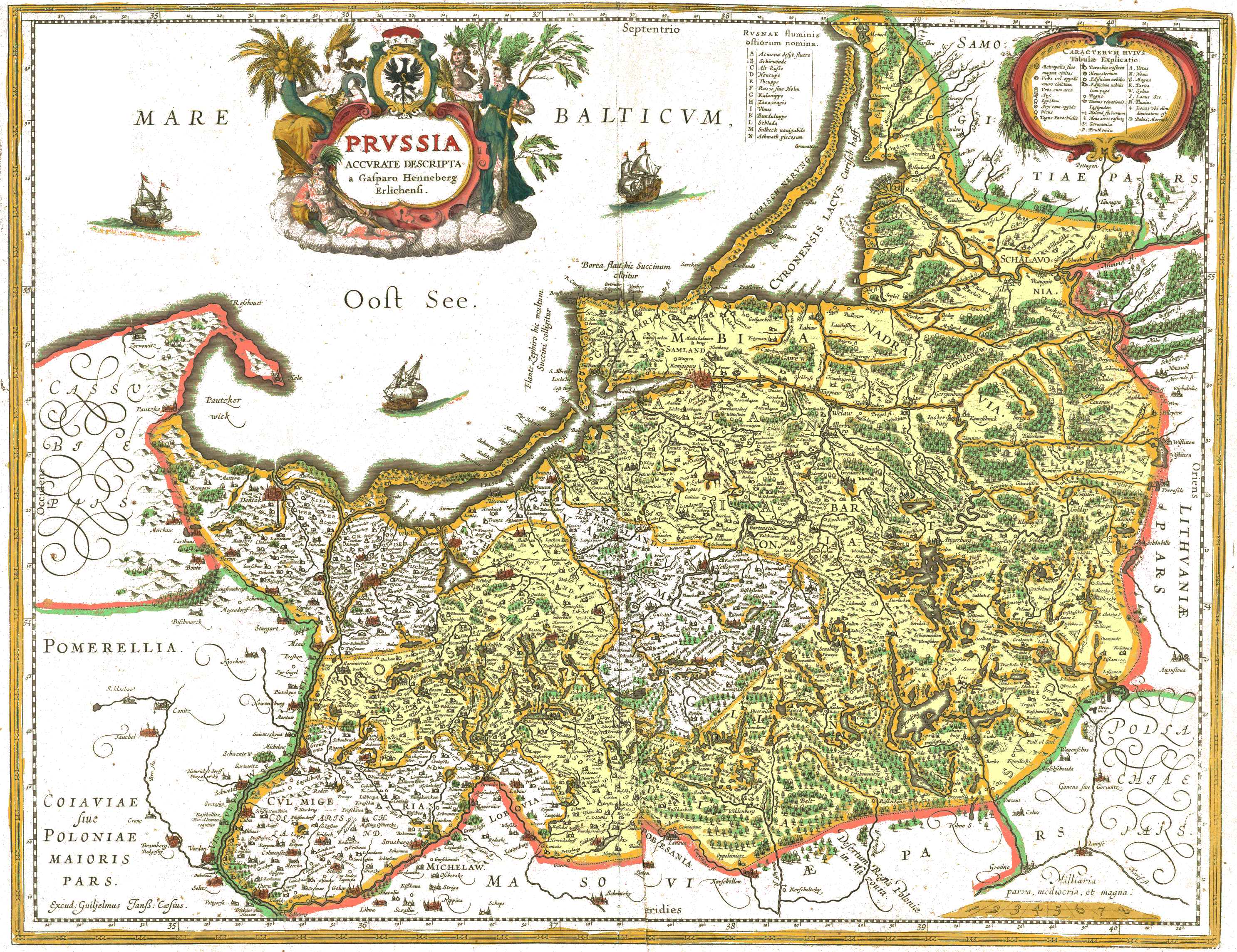
Map of Prussia after Henneberger's map - ca. 1625

Caspar Hennenberger (also Kaspar, Henneberger, Hennenberg, or Henneberg) (1529 – 29 February 1600) was a German Lutheran pastor, historian and cartographer.

Hennenberger was born in a Franconian place given as Erlich (Erlichhausen, or Ehrlichen in Thüringen) and started to study Lutheran divinity at the University of Königsberg in 1550. In 1554 he began to work at the congregation of Georgenau and in Domnau. Probably in 1561 he moved to Mühlhausen, where he worked as a Lutheran Pastor for the next 29 years.

With the patronage of Duke Albert of Prussia, and support by Prussian mathematicians like Nicolaus Neodomus, Hennenberger published the first detailed map of Prussia in 1576, the book "Kurze und wahrhaftige Beschreibung des Landes zu Preussen" (short and truthful description of the land Prussia) in 1584 and "Erklärung der preußischen größeren Landtafeln oder Mappen" (explanation of the larger Prussian maps) in 1594.

In 1590 Hennenberger became the Pastor of the Large Hospital at Königsberg-Löbenicht, where he died in 1600. He was buried in the hospital's Church.
