= Marceli Kosman =

Polish historian and professor (1940–2023)

- Born: May 8, 1940; Mühlental, Reichsgau Posen, Nazi Germany
- Died: December 29, 2023 (aged 83); Poznań, Greater Poland, Third Polish Republic
- Awards: Order of Polonia Restituta

Academic background
- Education: UAM
- Thesis: Dokumenty i kancelaria wielkiego księcia Witolda (1966)
- Doctoral advisor: Henryk Łowmiański
- Other advisor: Gerard Labuda

Academic work
- Discipline: History

Marceli Kosman (8 May 1940 – 29 December 2023) was a Polish historian who was a professor at the Adam Mickiewicz University (UAM).

Kosman finished secondary school in 1957. Then he went on to study at the UAM in Poznań. He gained MA in history in 1962 and PhD in 1966. The title of Kosman's doctoral thesis was Dokumenty i kancelaria wielkiego księcia Witolda. His supervisor was Henryk Łowmiański.

From 1961 to 1968 he was teacher in the liceum in Izbica Kujawska. In 1971 he passed his habilitation.

Kosman died on 29 December 2023, at the age of 83.

== Selected works ==
- Na tropach bohaterów "Trylogii" (1966)
- Wielki książę Witold (1967)
- Władysław Jagiełło (1968)
- Królowa Bona (1971)
- Zmierzch Perunka, czyli ostatni poganie nad Bałtykiem (1981)
- Orzeł i Pogoń. Z dziejów polsko-litewskich XIV-XX w. (1992)
- Od chrztu do chrystianizacji. Polska - Ruś - Litwa (1992)
- Na tropach bohaterów "Krzyżaków" (1995)
- Na tropach bohaterów "Quo vadis" (1998)
- Wojciech Jaruzelski wobec wyzwań swoich czasów. O kulturze politycznej w Polsce przełomu tysiącleci (2003)
- Dějiny Polska (2011)
