= Wilhelm Mannhardt =

German philologist (1831–1880)

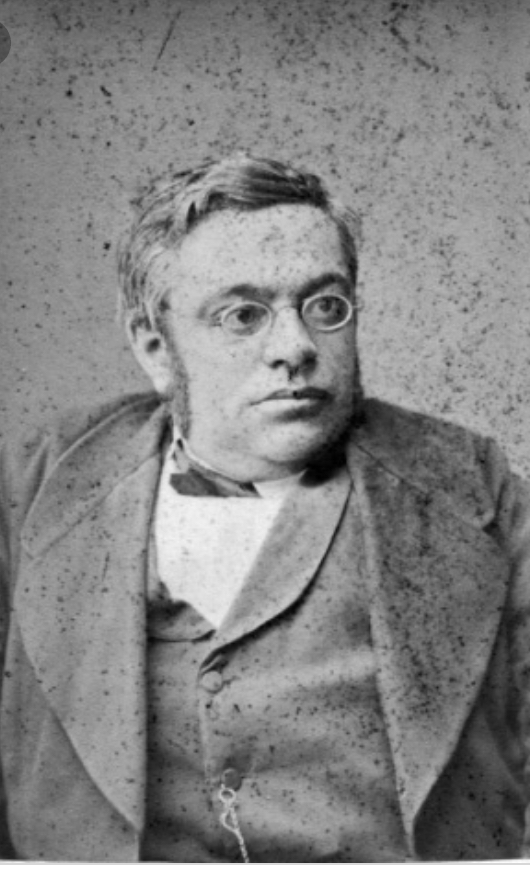
- Born: 26 March 1831; Friedrichstadt, Duchy of Schleswig, German Confederation
- Died: 25 December 1880 (aged 49); Danzig, West Prussia, Kingdom of Prussia, German Empire

Academic background
- Education: University of Berlin
- Academic advisor: Jakob Grimm

Academic work
- Discipline: Germanic studies
- Main interests: Germanic folklore; Germanic religion

Wilhelm Mannhardt (26 March 1831 – 25 December 1880) was a German mythologist and folklorist. He is known for his work on Germanic mythology, on Baltic mythology, and other pre-Christian European pantheons; and for his championing of the solar theory, namely in the early years of his career, under the influence of Jakob Grimm. Later on, Mannhardt focused more on vegetation spirits from an evolutionist point of view, namely the primitive tree cult and its later developments.

== Early life ==
Mannhardt was born in Friedrichstadt and raised in Danzig by a Mennonite preacher; his interest in folklore and mythology was sparked by reading Jakob Grimm’s Deutsche Mythologie and Jung-Stilling’s autobiography.

== Career ==
He studied German language and literature at Tübingen and received a doctorate in 1854; the following year he became editor of the Zeitschrift für deutsche Mythologie und Sittenkunde journal.

In 1865, he began to collect information on agrarian traditions, rituals and superstitions by sending out 150,000 questionnaires to clergymen, teachers, colleagues, and farmers’ associations in several languages.

== Later life ==
Due to ill health, he spent the last 17 years of his life as a librarian at the Danzig municipal library.

His manuscripts are held at the Berlin University Library.

== Works ==
- De nominibus germanorum propriis quae ad regnum referuntur observationis specimen (1857)
- Germanische Mythen: Forschungen (1858)
- Die Götterwelt der deutschen und nordischen Völker (1860)
- Roggenwolf und Roggenhund (1865)
- Die Korndämonen (1868)
- Letto-Preussische Götterlehre (1870)
- Wald- und Feldkulte. Band 1: Der Baumkultus der Germanen und ihrer Nachbarstämme: mythologische Untersuchungen (1875 - reprint)
- Wald- und Feldkulte. Band 2: Antike Wald- und Feldkulte aus nordeuropäischer Überlieferung erläutert (1877 - reprint)
- Klytia (1875)
- Gedichte. Mit einer Lebenskizze des Dichters. [Edited by L. and G. Mannhardt.] (1881)
- Mythologische Forschungen (1884)

== See also ==
August Bielenstein
