= Simon Grunau =

Simon Grunau (c. 1470 – c. 1530) was the author of Preussische Chronik, (Note: Full title: Cronika und beschreibung allerlüstlichenn, nützlichsten und waaren historien des namkundigenn landes zu Prewssen or Chronicle and description of the most amusing, useful and true known history of the Prussian land) the first comprehensive history of Prussia. The only personal information available is what he wrote himself in his work: that he was a Dominican priest from Tolkemit (Tolkmicko) near Frauenburg (Frombork) just north of Elbing (Elbląg) in the Monastic State of the Teutonic Order. He preached in Danzig (Gdańsk) and claimed to have met Pope Leo X and Polish King Sigismund I the Old. The chronicle was written in the German language sometime between 1517 and 1529. Its 24 chapters deal with Prussian landscape, agriculture, inhabitants, their customs, and history from earliest times to up to 1525 when the Protestant Duchy of Prussia was created. It also contains a short (about a hundred words) vocabulary of the Prussian language, one of the very few written artifacts of this extinct language. While often biased and based on dubious sources, this work became very popular and is the principal source of information on Prussian mythology. The chronicle circulated as a frequently copied manuscript and was first published in 1876. Modern historians often dismiss the Preussische Chronik as a work of fiction.

== Author bias ==
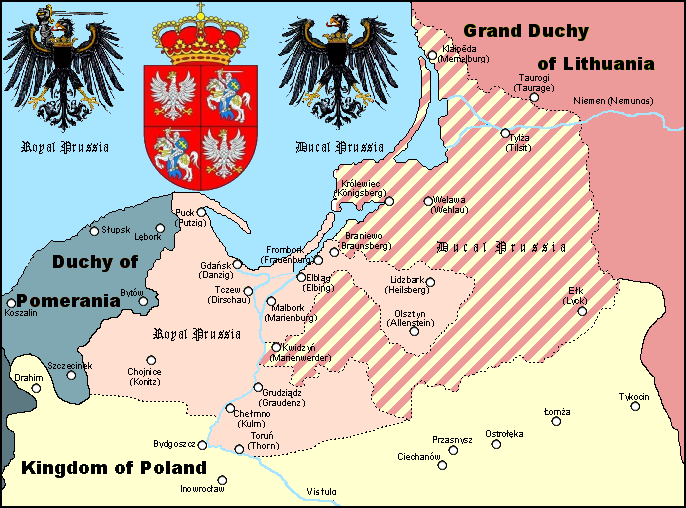
Division of Prussia into Royal Prussia (pink) and Ducal Prussia (striped)

Grunau lived at the time of political division and fierce religious conflicts in Prussia, and as a Catholic priest, was biased against Protestants. In 1525, the Monastic State of the Teutonic Knights was transformed into the Duchy of Prussia, the first Lutheran state in the world. Royal Prussia, under the sovereignty of the Crown of Poland, also became largely Lutheran; only the Bishopric of Warmia remained Catholic.

Traditions of the Old Prussians, the indigenous people of the region prior to the Prussian Crusade and influx of German colonists, were used in an attempt to find a common ground. Under such circumstances, Grunau was extremely critical of the Teutonic Knights and favored local Prussians, emphasizing their non-German origin. He wrote about their origins, customs, and religion in order to differentiate the Prussians from the Germans.

== Legendary content ==
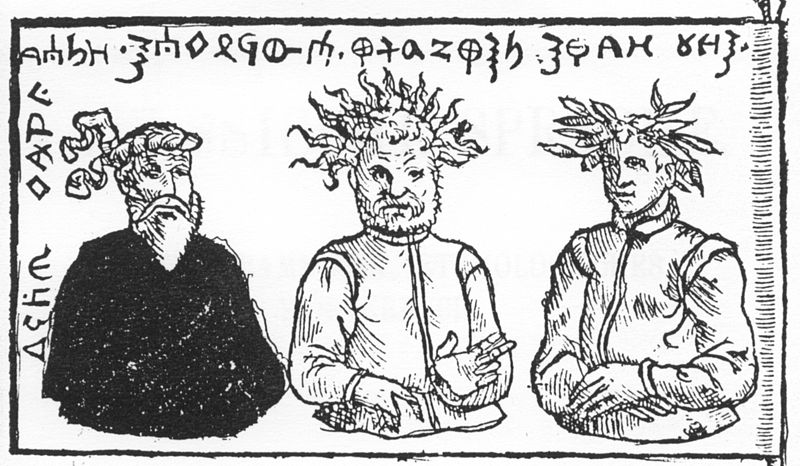
The so-called Flag of Widewuto was introduced by Grunau

Grunau claimed that he incorporated an ancient chronicle, written by the first Prussian bishop Christian (died in 1245). Supposedly Grunau discovered the manuscript, called Liber filiorum Belial, three hundred years after it was written. Christian's manuscript itself used three sources: personal observations by Christian, a book written by parish priest Jarosław from Płock, and notes by naturalist Dywonys, who was a sole survivor of an expedition stranded in Prussia by accident. Dywonys kept a diary in Russian using the Greek alphabet. His notes were discovered only 1200 years later by Christian. No such manuscripts are known to exist and scholarly consensus is that the entire story was invented by Grunau.

For the history of more recent times Grunau used all available sources (such as chronicles by Peter von Dusburg, official documents of the Teutonic Knights, and especially works by Erasmus Stella) and added his own imagination. For example, he took a description of Prussian holy place Romove (Romuva temple) from Peter von Dusburg and improved it by adding an eternally green oak, decorated with portraits of three idols and guarded by vestal virgins. Scholars agree that this addition was most probably borrowed from Adam of Bremen and his description of the Temple at Uppsala.

These stories were widely copied by other authors and spread into folklore. In 1853, Max Toeppen was the first to draw serious criticism to historical accuracy and value of Grunau's work. Modern historians almost universally dismiss the chronicle as a work of fiction except for excerpts about events that Grunau eye-witnessed himself. However, some Lithuanian researchers, including Gintaras Beresnevičius, believe such approach is overly critical and the chronicle should be more carefully analyzed to identify possibly valid information.

== Prussian glossary ==
To prove that Prussians had their own language, which was different from both Polish and Lithuanian, Grunau included a hundred-word glossary in the chronicle. Some words are distorted, but as one of the very few written sources for the now extinct Prussian language, it is still valuable. Grunau claimed that he could speak some Prussian, but he often mixed in Polish or Lithuanian words as if they were Prussian. Grunau also included the allegedly Prussian-language version of the Lord's Prayer. In 1962, Wolfgang P. Schmid proved that the prayer is actually in a mixture of Latvian and Curonian. Since the only other Prussian dictionary is the Elbing Prussian Vocabulary from about 1350 and hardly any written sources of Lithuanian or Latvian exist till after Grunau's death, the list by Grunau is still a very important document for the study of the Baltic languages.
