= Proto-Germanic folklore =

Beliefs of Proto-Germanic speakers

Proto-Germanic paganism was the beliefs of the speakers of Proto-Germanic and includes topics such as the Germanic mythology, legendry, and folk beliefs of early Germanic culture. By way of the comparative method, Germanic philologists, a variety of historical linguist, have proposed reconstructions of entities, locations, and concepts with various levels of security in early Germanic folklore (reconstructions are indicated by the presence of an asterisk). The present article includes both reconstructed forms and proposed motifs from the early Germanic period.

Linguistic reconstructions can be obtained via comparison between the various Germanic languages, comparison with related words in other Indo-European languages, especially Celtic and Baltic, comparison with borrowings into neighbouring language families such as Uralic, or via a combination of those methods. This allows linguists to project some terms back to the Proto-Germanic period despite their attestation in only one Germanic language; for instance, *saidaz ('magic') is only attested in Old Norse seiðr, but has parallels in Proto-Celtic *soytos and Lithuanian saitas.

== Deities ==
Proto-Germanic reconstruction	Romano-Germanic	West Germanic	North Germanic	East Germanic	Etymology	Notes
? *Agjō-þe(g)waz	–	OE Ecgþéow, OHG Eggideo	ON Eggþér	–	Meaning 'edge-servant'.	Peter H. Salus and Paul B. Taylor suggest that the name may have referred to an arouser of great battles and feuds, although other scholars remain skeptical about drawing a mythological parallel between Old English and Old Norse. See Eggþér for further discussion.
? Ala-fader	–	–	ON Alfǫðr	–	From Pre-Ger. *Ala-faþēr. Identical to PCelt. *Olo-(p)atīr (cf. Middle Irish Ollathair).	An epithet meaning 'all-father', used as a byname of Óðinn in Old Norse. It can be compared with the Middle Irish Eochu Ollathair, commonly used for the Dagda.
*Austrōn	(See entry notes)	OE Ēostre, OHG *Ôstara, OS *Āsteron	–	–	From the PIE stem *h_{2}(e)wes- ('to shine, glow red'). Cognate with the Lithuanian deity Aušrinė, and further related to the PIE dawn-goddess *h₂éwsōs.	A West Germanic spring goddess associated with a festival held in her name during the 'Easter-month', *Austro-mēnōþ, equivalent to modern 'April'. The matronae Austriahenae, if Germanic, derive from the same stem. The Old English and Old High German forms are the origin of the modern holiday names Easter and Ostern, respectively. See Ēostre for further discussion.
*Auza-wanđilaz	–	OE Ēarendel, OHG Aurendil, Lomb. Auriwandalo	ON Aurvandil	Goth. auzandil	Probably a compound of PGmc *auzom ('shiny, shiny liquid') and a derivate of *wanđuz ('rod, cane'). The PGmc form would therefore perhaps mean 'Light-Beam'	Generally seen as a personification of the 'rising light' of the morning, possibly embodying the Morning Star (Venus). See Aurvandill for further discussion.
*Balđraz	–	OE Bældæg, OHG Balder	ON Baldr	–	From PGmc *balþaz ('brave'), which is identical to Lith. báltas ('white', also the name of a light-god), based on the semantic development from 'white' to 'shining' or 'strong' (man) > 'hero, lord, prince'.	ON Baldr ('brave, defiant; lord, prince') and OHG Balder are close to OE bealdor ('prince, hero'). The OE theonym Bældæg likely means 'Shining Day', as suggested by his association with 'day' and by the name of the Lith. light-god Báltas. See Baldr for further discussion.
Divine horse twins or dioscuri (motif)	Alcis	OE Hengist and Horsa, Low German Hengist and Hors (Holstein, 1875)	–	–	–	Scholars have proposed a variety of figures in the ancient Germanic record as extensions of this motif. Tacitus (Germania), mentions twin deities, the Alcis (PGmc *alhiz ~ *algiz), who he compares to the Greek Dioscuri. The deities are generally seen as a reflex of the Proto-Indo-European Divine twins. Their name either means 'elk' or 'protector'. Some scholars have speculated that it may be related to the z-rune ᛉ (algiz), although evidence is scarce.
*Frawja- ~ *Fraw(j)ōn	–	OE frēa, OFris. frā, OS frōho, frāho, MDu. vroon, OHG frō	ON Freyr (theonym)	Goth. frauja	Unclear etymology.	An epithet meaning 'Lord'/'Lady'. Occurs as a theonym in Old Norse and, in a Christian context, in Old English. According to Kroonen, "both in form and meaning, fraiwa- ('seed') is reminiscent of Freyr 'fertility deity' < *frauja-. We may therefore consider the possibility that *fraiwa- was metathesized from *frawja-, a collective of some kind." See *Fraujaz for further discussion.
*Frawjōn	–	OE frōwe, OS frūa, OHG frouwa	ON Freyja (theonym)	–	Unclear etymology.	An epithet meaning 'Lord'/'Lady'. Occurs as a theonym in Old Norse and, in a Christian context, in Old English. According to Kroonen, "both in form and meaning, fraiwa- ('seed') is reminiscent of Freyr 'fertility deity' < *frauja-. We may therefore consider the possibility that *fraiwa- was metathesized from *frawja-, a collective of some kind." See *Fraujaz for further discussion.
*Frijjō	–	OE Frīg, OFris Frīa, OS Frī, OHG Frīja	ON Frigg	–	From PGmc *frijaz ('free'), itself from PIE *priH-o- ('one's own, beloved'). In a clan-based societal system, the meaning 'free' arose from the meaning 'related' (cf. PGmc *frijōnan 'to love', *friþuz 'friendship, peace').	Goddess, in most sources partner of *Wōđanaz. Source of *Frijjadag ('Frijjō-day; Friday'). See Frigg for further discussion.
*Fullōn	–	OHG Volla	ON Fulla	–	From PGmc *fullaz ('full'), meaning 'fullness, plenitude'	A goddess associated with *Frijjō. See Fulla for further discussion.
*Gautaz	–	OE Gēat, Lang. Gausus	ON Gautr, Gauti	Goth. Gaut (Gapt)	Derived from PGmc *geutanan ('to pour'), or an ablaut variant of *gutaz ~ *gutōn ('Goth, Gut')	A name for Odin. The early Germanic form may mean 'pourer (of semen)', i.e. 'man'. Rudolf Simek writes that as a mythical ancestor of the Goths (Gapt) and considered an ancestor in so many places he may have been the same as Odin in the Germanic peoples' common homeland in Scandinavia. Also the name of the Geats. See Gaut for further discussion.
? *Haihaz	–	–	ON Hárr	Goth. haihs	Cognate with PCelt. *kaiko- ('one-eyed, blind in one eye') and, with a slightly different meaning, with PIt. *kaikos ('blind').	Perhaps an epithet meaning 'One-Eyed', attested as a common noun in Gothic. ON Hárr, a byname of Óðinn, has been derived from an earlier Proto-Norse *Haiha-hariz/ʀ ('the One-eyed Hero'). According to scholar Adam Hyllested, "the Celtic god Lug closes one eye in his magic ritual, while in Germanic mythology being one-eyed is a key attribute of Óðinn". See Hárr for further information.
*Hludanaz	Hludana	–	ON Hlóðyn	–	Uncertain etymology.	According to De Vries, probably a chthonic deity. The ON Hlóðyn was possibly borrowed from the West Germanic theonym Hludana around the 8th c. AD. See Hludana for further discussion.
? *Huldō	–	Ger. Holda	ON Huld, Hulder	–	Meaning 'the Hidden One'.	Although the relationship between the names is uncertain, all forms point to a common meaning of 'the hidden one'.
*Ingwaz	–	OE Ing, OS Ing	ON Yngvi	Goth. Ing, enguz	Uncertain etymology	A mythical ancestor, progenitor of the Ingvaeōnes. See also the Latinized Proto-Germanic personal name Inguiomērus. Name of the ŋ-rune ᛝ. See Yngvi for further discussion.
? *Ingwina-frawjaz	–	OE frēa Ingwina	ON lngunarfreyr	–	Possibly a compound of PGmc *Ingwina- (Ing-friends') and *frawja- ('Lord'). *Ingwina- is derived from the name Ing- (see *Ingwaz) attached to PGmc *winiz ('friend'). Together, these forms mean 'Lord of the Ing-friends'. (See Ingaevones)	See also ON Ygvifreyr (< *Ingwia-frawjaz).
*Mannaz ~ *Manwaz	Mannus	OE mann, OFris mann, OS mann, OHG man(n)	ON maðr, mannr	Goth. manna	Meaning 'Man'. Cognate with Sanskrit Mánu and Avestan *Manuš.	Cosmogonical figure; son of *Twistō, divine ancestor of the West Germanic peoples (Tacitus). Name of the m-rune ᛗ (cf. man(n), maðr). See Mannus and Indo-European cosmogony for further discussion.
*Mēnōn	–	OE móna, OFris mōna, OS māno, ODu. māne, OHG māno	ON Máni	Goth. mēna, Crim. Goth. mine	Meaning 'Moon'. From PIE *meh₁n-ōs ('moon; month'). The Germanic n-stem arose secondarily from the nom. *mēnō, which may regularly continue *meh₁n-ōt (cf. PGmc *mēnōþ-z 'month').	Source of Late PGmc *Mēnandag ('Moon-day; Monday'). Personified as a deity, Máni ('Moon'), in Old Norse.
*Nerþuz	Nerthus	–	ON Njǫrðr	–	The original meaning of the theonym is contested. It may be related to the Irish word nert, meaning 'force' and 'power'. The name Njǫrðr may be related to Njǫrun, an Old Norse goddess name.	See Nerthus, Njörðr, and Sister-wife of Njörðr for further discussion.
*Sowelō ~ *Sōel	–	OHG Sunne (theonym), OE sigel	ON Sól (theonym)	Goth. sugil	PGmc *Sowel- > *Sōel- (gen. *Sunnōn) derives from the PIE word for 'sun', *séh₂uel, whose genitive form is *sh₂éns, sh₂unós. *Sugelan is a variant of Sowelō that can be morphologically compared to PGmc *sweglaz ('sunlight').	Meaning 'Sun'. A goddess and personification of the Sun. The variant *Sugelan may have been the original name of the s-rune ᛊ (cf. sigel, sugil), via taboo avoidance. The genitive form *Sunnōn is at the origin of OHG Sunne and Late PGmc *Sunnandag ('Sun-day'); it is also the predecessor to modern English Sun. See Sól for further discussion.
*Tīwaz	–	OE Tīw, OHG *Ziu	ON Týr	Goth. *Teiws	From PIE *deywós ('celestial', hence a 'deity'), itself from *dyēus ('daylight sky god').	A general epithet meaning 'god, deity' that eventually replaced the name of a specific deity whose original name is now lost. *Tīwaz was associated with the thing and equated with the Roman war god Mars through interpretatio germanica. Name of the t-rune (ᛏ). Source of Late PGmc *Tīwasdag ('Tīwaz-day; Tuesday'). See Týr for further discussion
*Twistō	Tuisto	–	–	–	Etymologically 'Twofold' (i.e. 'Twin', 'Bisexual', or 'Hermaphrodite'). Related to PGmc *twistaz, which is structurally close to Sanskrit dviṣṭa- ('staying in two places, ambiguous').	Legendary divine ancestor of the West Germanic peoples according to Tacitus. See Tuisto and Indo-European cosmogony for further discussion.
*Þingsaz	Thingsus	MDu. Dings*, MLG Dinges*, OHG Dinges*	–	–	From PGmc *þingaz ('thing, assembly').	An epithet meaning 'of the thing' Attached to Mars (*Tīwaz) in early West Germanic cultures (see interpretatio germanica and interpretatio romana); perhaps originally a god associated with law. Attested in Latin as Thingsus, and probably included in the name for 'Tuesday' in some Germanic languages.
*Þun(a)raz	–	OE Þunor, OS Thunar, OFris Thuner, OHG Donar	ON Þórr	–	From the PIE root *(s)tenh₂- ('thunder'). Cognate with the Celt. thunder-god Taranis (< *Tonaros), and further related to the Latin epithet Tonans.	Meaning 'Thunder' According to Peter Jackson, the Celtic–Germanic theonym *Þun(a)raz ~ *Tonaros may have emerged as the result of the fossilization of an original epithet or epiclesis of the PIE thunder-god *Perk^{w}unos. Source of Late PGmc *Þonaresdag ('Þunraz-day; Thursday'). See also below *melđunjaz, the name of *Þunraz's weapon. See Thor for further discussion.
*Yum(i)yaz	–	–	ON Ymir	–	Meaning 'Twin'. Cognate with Skt Yama, Av. Yima, and probably with Lat. Remus (< *Yemos).	Cosmogonical figure, mythical primeval ancestor. See Ymir and Indo-European cosmogony for further discussion.
*Wōđanaz	–	OE Wōden, OS Woden, OD Wuodan, OHG Wuotan, Lomb. Godan	ON Óðinn	–	Meaning 'Lord of Frenzy'. From PGmc *wōđaz ('delirious, raging') attached to the suffix -naz ('master of'). The former is identical to PCelt. *wātis ('seer, sooth-sayer') and Lat. vātēs ('prophet, seer').	Evidence points to a god strongly associated with ecstatic divination and wisdom. Compare the numerous Germanic cognates connoting 'violent agitation, mad rage, possession' with ON Óðr ('wit, sense, song, poetry'), OE wōð ('sound, voice, song'), and the other Indo-European cognates meaning 'seer, prophet'. Source of Late PGmc *Wōdanesdag ('Wōdanaz-day; Wednesday'). See Óðinn for further discussion.
? *Wōđaz	–	OE wōð, OHG wuot, MD woet	ON Óðr	–	From Pre-Germanic *uoh₂-tós. Related to PCelt *wātis ('seer, sooth-sayer') and *wātus ('prophesy, poetic inspiration').	Meaning 'possessed, inspired, delirious, raging'. The source of the Old Norse theonym *wōđa-naz. The related Celtic stem *wātu- is also attested in the Belgic god Vatumar. See Óðr for further discussion.
*Wulþuz	(o)wlþu-	–	ON Ullr	–	From PIE *ul-tu- < *uel- ('to see'). Identical to Lat. vultus ('facial expression, appearance').	Meaning 'Glory'. Attested as owlþuþewaz ('servant of owlþuz') on the Thorsberg chape (3rd c. AD). Cf. also Goth. wulþus ('glory'). OE wuldor ('glory') stems from PGmc *wuldraz. See Ullr for further discussion.
*Wurđiz	–	OE wyrd, OS wurd, OHG wurt	ON Urðr	–	Meaning 'Fate'. From PGmc *werþanan ('to come about, happen, become').	A concept comparable to fate personified as a female entity in Old Norse (a norn, a goddess-like being) and in Old English. See Urðr for further discussion.
Note: OE = Old English; OFris = Old Frisian; OFrank. = Old Frankish; OS = Old Saxon; MLG = Middle Low German; OD = Old Dutch; MDu. = Middle Dutch; OHG = Old High German; ON = Old Norse; Goth. = Gothic; Lomb. = Lombardic; Burg. = Burgundian; PGmc = Proto-Germanic; Pre-Ger. = Pre-Germanic; PIE = Proto-Indo-European; – = Unattested

== Entities ==
Proto-Germanic reconstruction	West Germanic	North Germanic	East Germanic	Etymology	Notes
*alƀaz	OE ælf, MD alf, MLG alf, OHG alb	ON álfr	Burg. *alfs	From the PIE root for '(matt) white', *h₂elbʰ-. Structurally close to Lat. albus ('(matt) white') and Grk alphoús ('white').	Evidence from the early Germanic languages, as well as occasional contemporary evidence of a Latin borrowing aelfae (referring to a diabolic being), point to a shared inherited belief in supernatural beings, though the precise details of this belief are hard to trace because of the limitation of sources. See elf for further discussion.
*al(j)a-wihtiz	OE æl-wiht	ON al-vitr	–	Compound of *aljaz ('other') and *wihtiz ('thing, creature').	See *wehtiz ~ *wihtiz below.
*ansuz ~ *ansiz	OE ōs, OS ās, OHG ansi-	ON áss	Goth. anses	Meaning '(a) deity'. From PIE *h₂ems-u- < *h₂ems- ('to give birth'). Identical to Hitt. ḫassu- ('king'), Skt. ásu- ('life, vital strength'), Av. ahu- ('lord'), or Venet. ahsu- ('cult image'). Further related to Skt ásura- and Av. ahura- ('god, lord'). Potentially connected to PGmc *ansaz 'beam' (see also Anthropomorphic wooden cult figurines of Central and Northern Europe).	Also attested in early Scandinavian runic asu- (probably for *ansu-). Name of the a-rune ᚨ. See Æsir for further discussion.
*đīsō ~ dīsi-	OE ides, OS idis, OHG itis	ON dís	–	Uncertain etymology. The West Germanic forms present some difficulty to resolve but the North Germanic and West Germanic forms are used explicitly as cognates (e.g. OE ides Scildinga and ON dís Skjǫldunga).	A variety of goddess-like supernatural female entity. Variously rendered by translators into modern English as terms like 'goddess', '(noble, divine) lady', or 'fairy'. The PGmc form may occur in the place name Idistaviso (perhaps PGmc *Idisiaviso 'plain of the Idisi') and may be further reflected in ON Iðavöllr if the location name is amended to *Ið[is]avöllr. According to Jan de Vries, although the connection between the West Germanic and Old Norse forms remains controversial, the fact that ON dís goes back to Proto-Germanic is proved by the personal names Frank. Agedisus, Disibod, Aleman. Disi, Lomb. Tiso. See dís and Idis (Germanic) and compare *wala-kuzjōn below.
*draugaz	–	ON draugr	–	Identical to PCelt. *drougos (cf. OIr. airdrech 'sprite, phantom' < *(p)ari-drougo-).	A name for a supernatural being akin to a phantom or a ghost. See draugr for further discussion.
*dwas-	OE dwœs, MHG ge-twās	–	–	From Pre-Ger. *dhwos-. Related to PCelt. *dwosyos (cf. Gaul. dusios 'incubus, daemon') and Lith. dvasià ('breath, spirit, soul').	A name for a supernatural being akin to a phantom or a ghost.
*đwergaz	OE dweorg, OFris. dwirg, OS *dwerg, MDu. dwerch, OHG twerg	ON dvergr	–	Unclear etymology. Perhaps from a PGmc verb *dwerganan ('to squeeze, press') possibly attested in MHG zwergen.	References to dwarfs as supernatural beings occur in Old Norse, Middle High German, and Middle Dutch. While Old English texts do not clearly show the mythological sense, it is suggested by the use of the word to label an unknown illness (likely blamed on a supernatural being), which may be compared with the early Scandinavian (runic) term tuirk, an ailment apparently marked by headaches. Additionally, early place names such as Dueridene, Dwerihouse and Dwerffehole hint at a supernatural concept of dwarfs, often associated with subterranean spaces. For further discussion, see Dwarf.
*etunaz	OE eōten	ON jǫtunn	–	Probably from PGmc *etanan ('to eat').	One of several terms connected to a class of entity. See jötunn for further discussion.
*gaistaz	OE gǽst, OFris gāst, OS gēst, ODu. gēst, OHG geist	–	–	Meaning 'ghost, spirit, wrath'. From Pre-Ger. *ghois-t-oz ('fury, anger'), which is comparable to Sanskrit héḍas ('anger') and Avestan zōižda- ('terrible, ugly').	Although the word is only attested in the West Germanic languages, it appears to be of pre-Germanic formation. See ghost for further discussion.
*gud(a)z	OE god, OFris. god, ODu. god, OS god, OHG got	ON guð	Goth. guþ	Meaning '(a) deity' and predecessor to modern English god. Unclear etymology. Traditionally derived from *ǵʰu-t(ó)- ('libated one') < *ǵʰeu- ('to pour'), although alternative connections with PIE *ǵʰeuH- ('to invoke'), with OCS gověti ('to revere'), or with Greek χυτὴ γαῖα ('burial mound') have also been proposed.	The source of PGmc *guđ(a)-fuhtaz ('god-fearing'), *guđ(a)-lausaz ('god-less'), aƀa-guđaz ('godless, lit. off-god'), *guđ(a)-waƀjaz ('precious fabric, silk'), or *guđ(a)-hūsan (temple; if not a calque of Lat. domus Dei).
*lenþa-wurmaz	MLG linde-worm, OHG lind-wurm	ON linn-ormr	–	Compound of *lenþaz ('snake') and *wurmaz ('worm').	A dragon or serpent-like entity. See lindworm and germanic dragon for further discussion.
*marōn	OE mære, MD māre, OS māra, OHG mara	ON mara	–	From PIE *mor-eh₂, of unclear origin. Cognate with Slav. *morà ('nightly spirit, bad dream') and OIr. mor-rígain ('queen of bad dreams'; a goddess of the battlefield and female malicious entity). See also the Russian kiki-mora, a female house-spirit that spins at night.	A malevolent female spirit associated with bad dreams (as in the second element of modern English night-mare). The image of a female ghost or malicious entity who tortures people by way of nightmares is apparently common to Slavic, Germanic and, possibly, Celtic. Borrowed from Middle Dutch into Old Picard as mare > cauque-mare (attached to cauquier 'to press'; mod. Fr. cauchemar), which designated a 'witch' haunting bad dreams. See Mare (folklore) for further discussion.
*nikwiz ~ *nikwuz ~ *nikwaza-	OE nicor, MDu. nicker, MLG necker, OHG nichus, nihhus	ON nykr	–	From PIE *nígʷ-ōs < *neigʷ- ('to wash').	An entity associated with water, which probably also existed under the feminine form *nikwazjōn (cf. OHG nickessa). See Nixie (folklore) for further discussion.
*skrattōn ~ *skradan-	OE scrætte, OHG scratto	ON skratti	–	An n-stem originally inflected as *skradō, gen. *skrattaz < *skrodʰōn, *skrodʰnós.	A variety of malicious entity.
*skōhsla-	–	–	Goth. skōhsl	Identical to PCelt. *skāhslo- (cf. Old Irish scál ‘supernatural or superhuman being, phantom, giant, hero; the god Lug’, Middle Welsh yscaul ‘hero, champion, warrior').	A name for an evil spirit or a demon.
*þurisaz	OE ðyrs, OHG duris	ON þurs	–	No clear etymology. Perhaps related to ON þyrja ('to rush'), ON þora ('to dare'), or Icel. þursi ('quarrel, anger, rage').	One of a series of semantically related Proto-Germanic terms for a type of entity. Borrowed into early Finnish as Turisas, a war god and a sea monster. See jötunn for further discussion.
*wrisjōn	OS wrisi-, OHG riso	ON risi	–	Probably related to Greek ῥίον ('peak, headland').	One of the Proto-Germanic terms semantically related to jötunn. Occurs also in OS wrisi-līk ('enormous, wrisi-like'). For further discussion, see jötunn.
*wala-kuzjōn	OE wælcyrge	ON valkyrja	–	Meaning 'chooser of the slain'. Compound of *walaz ('the slain') and *kuzjōn ('chooser' < PGmc *keusanan 'to trial, select'). See also OE wæl-cēasega, a name for 'raven' that literally means 'chooser of the slain'.	A variety of goddess-like female entity. Compare *đīsō above. See valkyrie for further discussion.
*wira-wulfaz	OE were-wulf, OFrank. *wer-wolf, MDu. weer-wolf, MLG wer-wulf, WFris. waer-ûl(e), MHG wer-wolf	ON varg-úlfr	–	Meaning 'man-wolf' and predecessor to modern English werewolf. Probably a compound of *wiraz ('man') and *wulfaz ('wolf'). Alternately derived from *wazi-wulfaz ('wolf-clothed'), bringing the compound semantically in line with the Slavic name for 'werewolf', *vьlko-dlakь, literally 'wolf-haired'.	The Norse branch underwent taboo modifications, with ON vargúlfr replacing *wiraz ('man') with vargr ('outlaw; wolf'), probably under the influence of Old French leus warous, which literally means 'wolf-werewolf'. Old Frankish *werwolf is inferred from ONorm. garwa(l)f ~ garo(u)l. The modern Norse forms varulv (Danish, Norwegian) and varulf (Swedish) were probably borrowed from MLG werwulf, or else be derived from an unattested ON *varulfr, posited as the regular descendant form of PGmc *wira-wulfaz. See werewolf for further discussion.
*wehtiz ~ *wihtiz	OE wiht, OS wiht, Du. wicht, OHG wiht	ON vættr	Goth. waihts	A 'creature'. Related to Slav. *vektь ('thing'). Possibly from PIE *weḱti- ~ *weǵʰ-ti-, or a Germanic–Slavic isogloss.	Cf. also Far. -vætti ('miserable creature') < *wehtja-. Referring to a 'creature, being, thing' in Germanic languages. See wight for further discussion
Note: OE = Old English; OFris = Old Frisian; OFrank. = Old Frankish; OS = Old Saxon; MLG = Middle Low German; OD = Old Dutch; MDu. = Middle Dutch; OHG = Old High German; ON = Old Norse; Goth. = Gothic; Lomb. = Lombardic; Burg. = Burgundian; PGmc = Proto-Germanic; Pre-Ger. = Pre-Germanic; PIE = Proto-Indo-European; – = Unattested

== Locations ==
Proto-Germanic reconstruction	Translation	West Germanic	North Germanic	East Germanic	Etymology	Notes
*Ferg(w)unjan ~ *Ferg(w)unjō	'mountain'	OHG Firgunnea	ON Fjǫrgyn	–	Probably from PIE *per-k^{w}un-ih₂ ('wooded mountains', i.e. the realm of *Perkwunos). Cognate with PCelt. *ferkunyo > (H)ercynia.	Cognate with or borrowed into Slav. as *per(g)ynja ('wooded hills'). Cf. also Goth. fairguni and OE firgen ('mountain'). See Perkwunos for further discussion.
*Haljō	'the concealed'	OE hell, OFris helle, ODu. helle, OS hellia, OHG hella	ON hel	Goth. halja	From PGmc *helanan ('to conceal, hide').	Precursor to modern English Hell, attested as an afterlife location throughout Germanic languages and personified as a female entity in Old Norse and Old English. See Hel (being) and Hel (location).
*Halja-wītjan	'hell-knowledge'	OE helle-wīte, OS helli-wīti, MHG helle-wītze	ON hel-víti	–	Compound of PGmc *Haljō ('Hell') and *wītjan ('knowledge, reason').	A poetic name for an underworld location. See *Haljō above.
*hem(e)naz	'heaven'	OE heofon, OFris. himel, OS heƀan, ODu. himil, MLG hēven, OHG himil	ON himinn	Goth. himins	From the gen. *h₂ḱmnós of PIE *h₂eḱmon ('heavenly vault of stone'). Possibly cognate with PGmc *hamaraz ('hammer') via a metathesized stem *ḱ(e)h₂-m-r- (cf. Grk kamára 'vault').	See Perkwunos#Heavenly vault of stone for further discussion.
*(hemena-)wangaz	'(heaven-)meadow'	OS heƀan-wang, OE (neorxna-)wang	ON himin-vangr, (Fólk)vangr	Gothic waggs	Compound of PGmc *hemenaz ('heaven') and *wangaz ('meadow'). The noun *wangaz stems from the PIE root *uongʰ-, denoting a 'field'.	A term denoting an afterlife heavenly meadow. PGmc *wangaz occurs as a gloss for 'paradise' in Old Norse, Old English, and Gothic, implying an early Germanic concept of an afterlife field in the heaven. Fólkvangr is an afterlife location associated with the goddess Freyja in Old Norse texts. See Fólkvangr and Neorxnawang.
*Meðjana-garðaz	'middle-enclosure'	OE middan-geard, OS middil-gard, OHG mitti-gart	ON mið-garðr	Goth. midjun-gards	Compound of PGmc *meðjanaz ('middle') and *garðaz ('enclosure, courtyard').	See Midgard for further discussion.
*wira-alđiz	'man-age'	OE weorold, OFris. wrald, OS werold, MDu. werelt, OHG weralt	ON verǫld	–	Compound of PGmc *wiraz ('man') and *alđiz ('age').	The inhabited world, the realm of humankind. Source of modern English world.
Note: OE = Old English; OFris = Old Frisian; OFrank. = Old Frankish; OS = Old Saxon; MLG = Middle Low German; OD = Old Dutch; MDu. = Middle Dutch; OHG = Old High German; ON = Old Norse; Goth. = Gothic; Lomb. = Lombardic; Burg. = Burgundian; PGmc = Proto-Germanic; Pre-Ger. = Pre-Germanic; PIE = Proto-Indo-European; – = Unattested

== Other ==
Proto-Germanic reconstruction	Translation	West Germanic	North Germanic	East Germanic	Etymology	Notes
*alh(a)z	'temple'	OE ealh, OS alah	ON -áll	Goth. alhs	Identical to Lith. alkas ('holy grove').	–
*austro-mēnōþ	'Austrōn-month'	OE ēosturmōnaþ, ODu. ostermanoth, OHG ōstarmānōd	–	–	A compound of WGmc *Austrōn (a female deity) and *mēnōþ ('month').	A West Germanic name for the 'month of *Austrōn', associated with a festival held around April and eventually displaced by the Christian Easter. See Ēostre and Ēosturmōnaþ for further discussion.
*ƀlōtanan	'to sacrifice'	OE blōtan, OHG bluozan	ON blóta	Goth. blotan	Traditionally compared to Lat. flāmen ('sacrificial priest'), possibly from an earlier *flādsmen < *bʰleh₂dmen-.	Source of PGmc *ƀlostran ('sacrifice') and *ƀlotan ('sacrifice, worship').
*ƀlōta-hūsan	'house of worship, house of sacrifice'	OHG bluoz-hūz	ON blót-hús	–	Compound of PGmc *ƀlotan ('sacrifice, worship') and *hūsan ('house').	Place of worship, temple.
*elhja-	'evil'	–	ON illr	–	From Pre-Ger. *elkyo-, attested in the Finnish loanwords elkiä ('mean, malicious') and ilkeä ('bad, mean, wicked'). Possibly related to Old Irish ol(c)c ('bad, evil').	–
*frijjadag	'Friday'	OE Frīgedæg, OFris. Frīadei, MDu. Vriendach, MLG Vrīdach, OHG Frīatag	ON Frjádagr	–	A Late PGmc compound of *Frijjō ('Frigg') and *dag ('day'). Calque of Lat Veneris dies.	See *Frijjō above. ON Frjádagr was borrowed from OHG Frīatag. Source of Modern English Friday.
*galđran	'magic song, spell, charm'	OE gealdor, OHG galtar	ON galdr	–	From PGmc *galanan ('to shout, sing, chant').	See galdr for further discussion.
*guđ(j)ōn	'priest'	OE *gydda	ON goði, gyðja	Goth. gudja	From PGmc *guđaz ('god').	The Old English form appears as an apparent historical element of Modern English place names such as Gedding and Gidleigh.
*hailagaz	'holy'	OE hālig, OFris. hēlich, OS hēlag, OHG heilag	ON heilagr	Goth. hailags	From PGmc *hailaz ('hale, whole, sound').	Source of PGmc *hailagōjanan ('to make holy, consecrate').
*hailaga-mēnōþ	'holy-month'	OE hāliġ-mōnaþ, ODu. heil-mānōth, OHG heilag-mānōth	–	–	A compound of PGmc *hailagaz ('holy') and *mēnōþ ('month').	A West Germanic name for the 'holy month', equivalent to modern 'September' or 'December'. See Hāliġmōnaþ for further discussion.
*harƀistu-mēnōþz	'autumn-month, harvest-month'	OE hærfest-mōnaþ, ODu. hervist-mānōth, OHG herbist-mānōth	ON haust-mánuðr	–	A compound of PGmc *harƀistaz ('autumn, harvest') and *mēnōþz ('month').	Early Germanic name of the 'month of harvest'; roughly equivalent to modern 'August–November'. Cf. also ODu. Aranmānōth ~ OHG Aranmānōd ('harvest month, August'), from another PGmc stem *azani- ('harvest').
*har(u)gaz	'holy stone', perhaps 'sacrificial mound'	OE hearg, OHG harug	ON hǫrgr	–	From Pre-Ger. *karkú-. Probably borrowed from the same non-Indo-European source as PCelt. *karrikā ('stone').	See hörgr for further information
*halja-rūnō(n)	'witch, sorceress'	OE helle-rūne, OHG helli-rūna	–	Lat.-Goth. pl. (Jordanes) haliurunae	Compound of *haljō ('Hel') and *rūnō ('secret, mystery, rune').	–
*hunslan	'sacrifice'	OE hūsel	ON húsl	Goth. hunsl	A sla-suffix added to the PIE stem *ḱuent- ('holy, sacred').	–
*hugi-rūnō	'secret of the mind, magical rune'	OE hyge-rūn	ON hug-rúnar	–	Compound of *hugiz ('understanding, mind') and *rūnō ('secret, mystery, rune').	–
*jehwlan	'Yule'	OE geō(hho)l	ON jól	Goth. *jaihl	No credible etymology.	Name of a Germanic festival organized at the end of each year. Cf. also *Jehwla-đagaz ('Yule-day'). See Yule for further discussion.
*jehwla-mēnōþz ~ *jehwlaz	'Yule-month'	OE gēol-mōnaþ, gīuli	ON jól-mánuðr, ýlir	Goth. jiuleis	No credible etymology.	Name of a Germanic festival organized at the end of each year. Cf. also *Jehwla-đagaz ('Yule-day'). See Yule for further discussion.
*jēra-mēnōþz	'year-month'	OHG jār-mānōd	ON ár-mánaðr	–	A compound of PGmc *jēran ('year') and mēnōþz ('month').	Early Germanic name of the 'year-month'; equivalent to modern 'January'.
*kunjaz	'omen'	–	ON kyn	–	Closely related to Lith. žinià ('knowledge, magic').	–
*lēk(i)jaz	'healer, physician'	OE lǣce, OS lāki, OFris. letza, OHG lāhhi	ON lækir	Goth. lekeis	From Pre-Ger. *lēgyos. Borrowed from PCelt. lēagis (cf. OIr. lieig 'physician, healer, leech').	Source of PGmc *lēkinan ('cure, remedy') and *lēkinōjanan ('to heal').
*lubjan	'herbal medicine, magic potion'	OE lybb, OS lubbi, MDu. lubbe, OHG lubbi	ON lýf	Goth. lubja-	Related to PGmc *lauban ('foliage'; cf. PCelt. *lubi- 'herb').	Medicinal herb associated with magic (cf. Goth. lubja-leisei 'witchcraft, alchemist', OHG lubbari 'magician').
*melđunjaz	'lightning', 'hammer'	–	ON Mjǫllnir	–	From a PIE stem meld-n-, which may have originally designated Perkwunos' weapon. Cognate with Latv. milna (Pērkōns' hammer), OPrus. mealde ('lightning'), OCS mъldni ('lightning'), Welsh mellten ('bolt of lightning').	Thor's hammer. See Mjǫllnir for further discussion.
*mēnandag	'Monday'	OE Mōnandæg, OFris. Mōnandei, MDu. MLG Mānendach, OHG Mānetag	ON Mánadagr	–	A Late PGmc compound of *Menōn ('Moon') and *dag ('day'). Calque of Lat Lunae dies.	See *Mēnōn above. Source of Modern English Monday.
*nemeđaz	'sacred grove'	OFrank. nimid, OS nimidas	Swed. Nymden	–	Related to or borrowed PCelt. *nemetom ('sacred grove, sanctuary').	See sacred trees and groves in Germanic paganism and mythology
*rūnō	'secret, mystery; secret counsel; rune'	OE rūn, OS rūna, MDu. rūne, OHG rūna	ON rún	Goth. runa	Borrowed from or cognate with PCelt. *rūna ('secret, magic').	Source of PGmc *runōn ('counsellor'), *rūnjan ('mystery'), *raunō ('trial, inquiry, experiment'). See runes for further discussion.
*rūna-stabaz	'runic letter'	OE rūn-stæf, OHG rūn-stab	ON rúna-stafr	–	A compound of PGmc *rūnō ('secret, mystery, counsel') and *stabaz ('staff; letter').	–
*saidaz	'spell, charm, magic'	–	ON seiðr	–	From Pre-Ger. *saiþa-, which is cognate with Lith. saitas ('soothsaying, talisman') and PCelt. *soyto- ('magic'). Probably originally identical to PIE *soito- ('string, rope'), from *seh_{2}i- ('to bind').	See also the PGmc verb *sīdanan ('to work charms'; cf. ON síða) and OE -siden 'magic' (< *sidnō-).
*saiwalō	'soul'	OE sāwel; OFris sēle; OS sēola, sēla; OHG sēola, sēla	–	Goth. saiwala	According to Vladimir Orel, derived from PGmc *saiwiz ~ *saiwaz ('sea, lake'), "probably because of a Germanic belief in souls born out of and returning to sacred lakes".	–
*skaldaz	'poet'	OHG skelto	ON skáld	–	Probably from a PGmc verb *skeldanan ~ *skadjanan ('to announce, reproach'; cf. ME scolden, OFri. skelda, ODu. sceldan, OHG sceltan). Perhaps related to PCelt. *sketlo- ('story, tidings'; cf. OIr. scél 'saga, narrative', MWelsh chwedl 'traditional narrative, tidings').	OHG skelto, MHG schelte mean 'blamer, criticizer, satirist'. Middle English scāld was borrowed from ON skáld. See skald for further discussion.
*sumlan	'banquet, symposium'	OE symbel, OS sumbal	ON sum(b)l	–	From PIE *sṃ-lo- ('joint meal').	See symbel for further discussion.
*sunnandag	'Sunday'	OE Sunnandæg, OFris. Sunnandei, MDu. Sonnendach, MLG Sunnendach, OHG Sunnūntag	ON Sunnudagr	–	A Late PGmc compound of *sunnōn (genitive of *Sowēlo 'Sun') attached to *dag ('day'). Calque of Lat Solis dies.	See Sowēlo ~ Sōel above. Source of Modern English Sunday.
*tafnan	'sacrificial meat'	–	ON tafn	–	From Pre-Ger. dapno- < PIE *dh₂p-no- ('sacrificial meal'). Cognate with Lat. damnum ('harm, damage, loss'), MIr. dúan ('poem, song') and Arm. tawn ('feast').	–
*taufran	'sorcery, magic'	OE tēafor, OFris. tāver, MLG tover, OHG zoubar	ON taufr	–	Possibly derived from PGmc *tawjanan ('to do, make').	–
*tiƀran	'sacrifice, animal offering'	OE tiber, tifer, OHG zebar	–	Goth. aibr	Cognate with Greek δεῖπνον ('meal') and Arm. tvar ('male sheep') < PIE *déip-r, gen. dip-n-ós. According to some scholars, Goth. aibr should be emended to *tibr.	–
*tīwasdag	'Tuesday'	OE Tīwesdæg, OFris. Tīesdei, OHG Ziestag	ON Týsdagr	–	A Late PGmc compound of *Tīwaz (Týr) and *dag ('day'). Calque of Lat Martis dies.	See *Tīwaz above. Source of Modern English Tuesday.
*þonaresdag	'Thursday'	OE Þunresdæg, OFris. Thunresdei, MDu. Donresdach, OHG Donarestag	ON Þórsdagr	–	A Late PGmc compound of *Þun(a)raz (Thor) and *dag ('day'). Calque of Lat Iovis dies.	See *Þun(a)raz above. Source of Modern English Thursday.
*wīhaz	'holy, divine'	OE wīg-, OS wīh-, OHG wīh	–	Goth. weihs	From PIE *wéik-o-. Identical to Lith. viẽkas ('life force'), and further related to Lat. victima ('sacrificial animal').	Source of PGmc *wīhēnan ~ *wīhjanan ('to consecrate'), *wīhislōn ('consecration'), and *wīhiþō ('holiness, sanctity').
*wīhan	'sanctuary'	OE wīh, OS wīh, OHG wīh	ON vé	–	From PGmc *wīhaz ('holy, divine').	See Vé (shrine) for further discussion.
*wīhōn	'priest'	–	ON Véi	Goth. weiha	From PGmc *wīhaz ('holy, divine').	See Vili and Vé for further discussion.
*wikkōnan	'to practice sorcery'	OE wiccian, WFris. wikje, MDu. wicken, MHG wicken	–	–	From PGmc *wīhaz ('holy, divine').	This verb served as the derivational base for OE wicca ('witch') and MHG MDu. wicker ('soothsayer'). Source of Modern English witch.
*wītagōn	'wizard, prophet'	OE wítega, OHG wīzago	ON vitki	–	From PGmc *witanan ('to know').	Source of the PGmc verb *wītagōjanan ('to prophesy').
*wōdanesdag	'Wednesday'	OE Wōdnesdæg, OFris. Wērnisdei, MDu. Woensdach, MLG Wōdensdach, OHG Wōdanstag	ON Óðinsdagr	–	A Late PGmc compound of *Wōdanaz (Odin) and *dag ('day'). Calque of Lat Mercurii dies.	See *Wōdanaz above. Source of Modern English Wednesday.
Note: OE = Old English; OFris = Old Frisian; OFrank. = Old Frankish; OS = Old Saxon; MLG = Middle Low German; OD = Old Dutch; MDu. = Middle Dutch; OHG = Old High German; ON = Old Norse; Goth. = Gothic; Lomb. = Lombardic; Burg. = Burgundian; PGmc = Proto-Germanic; Pre-Ger. = Pre-Germanic; PIE = Proto-Indo-European; – = Unattested

== Shared lexicon with Celtic, Baltic and Slavic ==
=== Proto-Celtic ===
The common religious vocabulary between Celtic and Germanic languages suggests that speakers of Proto-Germanic and Proto-Celtic were in close contact in ancient times and likely shared some of their beliefs. This connection likely dates back even further to interactions between Pre-Germanic and Celtic languages, as shown by some cognates that do not exhibit the effects of Grimm's Law, which is usually dated to around 500 BCE.

Historian John T. Koch argues that Pre-Germanic and Pre-Celtic languages remained in close contact from 1800 to between 1200 and 900 BCE, partly due to the long-distance metal trade with Scandinavia. A few of these terms can be identified as Celtic loanwords that entered the Germanic languages between 900 and 500 BCE, after the sound changes in Proto-Celtic had been completed, but before the emergence of Grimm's Law in Proto-Germanic.

=== Baltic and Slavic ===
The relationship between Proto-Germanic speakers and those of Proto-Baltic and Proto-Slavic is unclear. Edgar Polomé writes that the "acceptable lexical evidence exclusively shared by the Germanic, Baltic, and Slavic tribes is hardly sufficient to draw any definite conclusions as to their close relationship". Frederik Kortlandt argues that because a substantial portion of the vocabulary shared between Germanic and Balto-Slavic was borrowed after the Baltic–Slavic split, Germanic and Proto-Balto-Slavic could never have been contiguous Indo-European dialects. According to him, the earliest contacts between Germanic and Baltic-Slavic speakers must date to the early Middle Ages, and Germanic loanwords in Baltic must have passed through a Slavic intermediary.

Some religious materials have been found to be shared between Germanic, Slavic and Celtic. For instance, the Proto-Germanic word for werewolf (*wira-wulfaz, 'man-wolf') appears to be semantically related to the Proto-Slavic and Proto-Celtic equivalents *vьlko-dlakь ('wolf-haired') and *wiro-kū ('man-dog'), respectively. The motif of the Wild Hunt is also shared amongst the Germans, Celts, and Slavs.

=== Shared lexicon ===
Germanic	Celtic	Balto-Slavic	Meaning	Sources
*Ala-fader	*Olo-(p)atīr	–	'All-Father' (an epithet)	
*alh(a)z	–	Lith. alkas	'holy grove, temple'	
*Austrōn	–	Lith. Aušrinė	a goddess connected with the dawn	
*dwas-	*dwosyos	Lith. dvasià	'incubus, daemon, spirit, soul, ghost'	
*draugaz	*drougo-	–	'sprit, phantom'	
*elhja-	ol(c)c	–	'bad, evil'	
*ferg(w)unjō	*ferkunyo	Slav. *per(g)ynja	'wooded mountains' (realm of *Perkwunos)	
*Haihaz	*kaiko-	–	'one-eyed, blind in one eye' (an epithet)	
*har(u)gaz	*karnom	–	'holy stone, funerary monument'	
*kunjaz	–	Lith. žinià	'omen, knowledge, magic'	
*lēk(i)jaz	*lēagis	–	'healer'	
*lubjan	*lubi-	–	'(medicinal) herb'	
*marōn	*morā	Slav. *morà	'nightly spirit, bad dream'	
*meldunjaz	*meldo-	*mild-n- ~ *meld-n-	'lightning, hammer of the thunder-god'	
*nemedaz	*nemetom	–	'sacred grove, sanctuary'	
*rūnō	*rūnā	–	'secret, magic, mystery'	
*saidaz	*soytos	Lith. saitas	'magic, charm, soothsaying'	
*skaldaz	? *sketlo-	–	'poet'	
*skōhsla-	*skāhslo-	–	'demon, supernatural being, evil spirit'	
*Þun(a)raz	*Tonaros	–	From PIE *(s)tenh₂- ('thunder')	
*wehtiz	–	Slav. *vektь	'creature'	
*wīhaz	–	Lith. viẽkas	'holy, divine'	
*wōðaz	*wātis	–	'seer, sooth-sayer; ecstatic, possessed, (divinely) inspired'	

== See also ==
- Anthropomorphic wooden cult figurines of Central and Northern Europe
- Sacred trees and groves in Germanic paganism and mythology
- Proto-Celtic paganism
- Proto-Indo-Iranian paganism
