= Perun =

Slavic supreme god of the sky and war

- God of the sky, lightning, thunder, war
- Member of Vladimir's pantheon
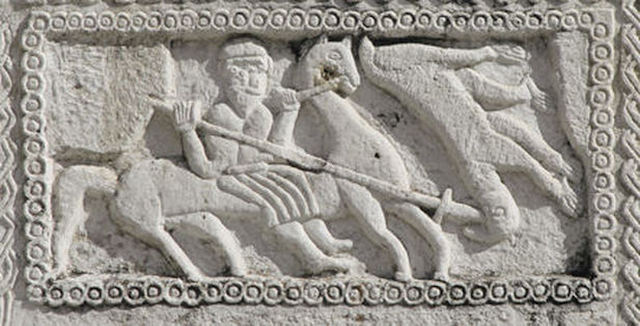
- Relief sculpture of Perun defeating Veles. Žrnovnica, Croatia. Probably, 8th century
- Weapon: Hammer, mace or axe
- Battles: Battle of Perun and Veles
- Animals: Eagle
- Symbol: Oak, fire, iris

Genealogy
- Consort: Mokosh, Perunika or Dodola
- Children: Jarilo and Morana

Equivalents
- Indo-European: Perkwunos
- Finnic: Ukko
- Baltic: Perkūnas

In Slavic mythology, Perun (Cyrillic: Перун) is the highest god of the pantheon and the god of sky, thunder, lightning, storms, rain, law, war, fertility and oak trees. His other attributes were fire, mountains, wind, iris, eagle, firmament (in Indo-European languages, this was joined with the notion of the sky of stone), horses and carts, and weapons (hammer, axe (Axe of Perun), and arrow). The supreme god in the Kievan Rus' during the 9th-10th centuries, Perun was first associated with weapons made of stone and later with those of metal.

== Sources ==
Of all historic records describing Slavic gods, those mentioning Perun are the most numerous. As early as the 6th century, he was mentioned in De Bello Gothico, a historical source written by the Eastern Roman historian Procopius. A short note describing beliefs of a certain South Slavic tribe states they acknowledge that one god, creator of lightning, is the only lord of all: to him do they sacrifice an ox and all sacrificial animals. While the name of the god is not mentioned here explicitly, 20th century research has established beyond doubt that the god of thunder and lightning in Slavic mythology is Perun. To this day, the word perun in a number of Slavic languages means "thunder," or "lightning bolt".

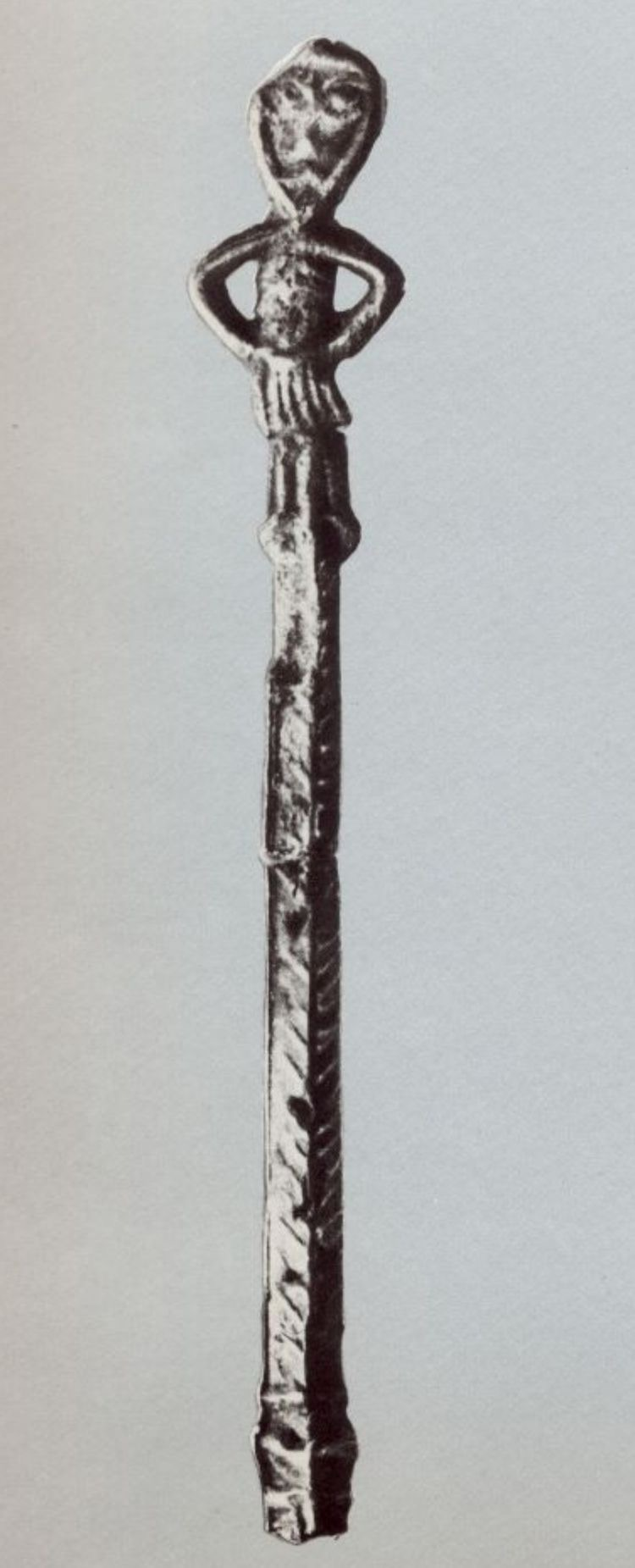
Figurine of Perun from Veliky Novgorod, 12th century.

The Primary Chronicle relates that in the year 6415 (907 AD) prince Oleg (Old Norse: Helgi) made a peace treaty with the Byzantine Empire and by taking his men to the shrines and swearing by their weapons and by their god Perun, and by Volos, the god of cattle, they confirmed the treaty. The same form of confirmation of a peace treaty by prince Igor has been found dating back to 945. In 980, when prince Vladimir the Great came to the throne of Kiev, he erected statues of five pagan gods in front of his palace which he soon thereafter discarded after his Christianization in 988. Perun was chief among these, represented with a silver head and a golden moustache. Vladimir's uncle Dobrynya also had a shrine of Perun established in his city of Novgorod. After the Christianization of Kievan Rus, this place became a monastery, which, quite remarkably, continued to bear the name of Perun.

Perun is not mentioned directly in any of the records of Western Slavic traditional religion, but a reference to him is perhaps made in a short note in Helmold's Chronica Slavorum, written in the latter half of the 12th century, which states (quite similarly to Procopius some six centuries earlier) that Slavic tribes, even though they worship many various gods, all agree there is a supreme god in heaven which rules over all other on earth. This could be a reference to Perun, but since he is not named, nor any of his chief attributes (thunder or lightning) mentioned, we cannot be certain.

Slavic traditions preserved very ancient elements and intermingled with those of neighbouring European peoples. An exemplary case are the South Slavic still-living rain rituals Perperuna and Dodola of the couple Perun–Perperuna/Perunika, Lord and Lady Thunder, shared with the neighbouring Albanians, Greeks and Arumanians, corresponding to the Germanic Fjörgynn–Fjörgyn, the Lithuanian and Latvian Perkūnas/Dundulis–Perkūna/Pērkons, and finding similarities in the Vedic hymns to Parjanya.

== Etymology ==
Perun is strongly correlated with the near-identical Perkūnas/Pērkons from Baltic mythology, suggesting either a common derivative of the Proto-Indo European thunder god (whose original name has been reconstructed as *Perkʷūnos), or that one of these cultures borrowed the deity from the other. The root *perkwu originally probably meant oak, but in Proto-Slavic this evolved into *per- meaning "to strike, to slay".

The Lithuanian word "Perkūnas" has two meanings: "thunder" and the name of the god of thunder and lightning. From this root comes one of the names attributed to the Finnish deity Ukko, Perkele which has a Balto-Slavic origin.

Artifacts, traditions and toponyms show the presence of the cult of Perun among all Slavic, Baltic and Finnic peoples. Perun was also related to an archaic form of astronomy – the Pole star was called Perun's eye and countless Polish and Hungarian astronomers continued this tradition – most known well known is Nicolaus Copernicus.

== Weapons ==
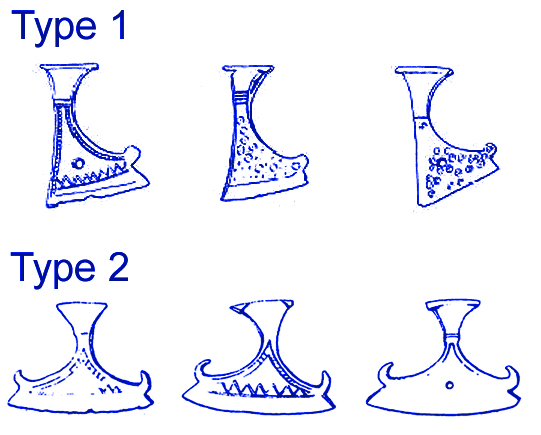
Drawings of Slavic axe amulets based on archaeological findings dating between the 11th and 12th century

In the classification scheme of Georges Dumézil, Perun was the god of the second function (physical and military power), a god of war, and as such, he was armed with several fantastic weapons. Perun's lightning bolts were believed to be stones and stone arrows. According to folk beliefs, fulgurites, belemnites, and sometimes even the remains of prehistoric stone tools found in the ground are remains of these weapons. Various Slavic countries also call these deposits "Perun's stones", "thunderbolt stones", "thunderbolt wedges" and "Perun's arrow"; other unrelated names for these include "devil's finger", "God's finger", and "Mother of God finger", and in Lithuania, "Perkun's finger" (Belemnitida). These thunderbolt stones were sometimes said to be transferred back to the sky by the wind after being under earth for a period of seven years. The weapons of Perun protected against bad luck, evil magic, disease, and – naturally enough – lightning itself.

Perun also had another type of weapon in his arsenal, as destructive as his firestone arrows, but even more unusual: mythical golden apples. While this may not seem to be much of a weapon, in many Slavic folk accounts, the golden apple appears as a talisman of ultimate destruction. An example from a folk song from Montenegro with strong mythical elements relates:

...Те извади три јабуке златне
И баци их небу у висине...
...Три муње од неба пукоше
Једна гађа два дјевера млада,
Друга гађа пашу на дорину,
Трећа гађа свата шест стотина,
Не утече ока за свједока,
Ни да каже, како погибоше, '

…He grabbed three golden apples
And threw them high into the sky...
…Three lightning bolts burst from the sky,
The first struck at two young grooms,
The second struck pasha on brown horse,
The third struck six hundred wedding guests,
Not an eyewitness left
Not even to say how they died.'

== The cult of Perun among neighboring tribes ==
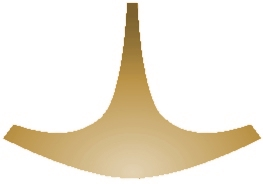
The Ukko axe is a pre-Christian amulet that represents the Finnic deity

The Baltic tribes had a widespread cult of the thunderer Perkunas, one of the main deities of the Baltic pantheon. With Perun, this deity also shares common attributes (amulets in the form of an axe, a fiery four-pointed symbol, oak as the main tree) and the origin of the name (from the PIE root *perk). In the modern Baltic languages, related words associated with the deity Perkunas have been preserved: Lithuanian perkūnas ('thunder') and perkūnija ('lightning'); Latvian pērkons ('thunder').

Perun was worshipped by the Varangian (Scandinavian) warriors hired by Oleg and Igor during the campaigns against Byzantium (In the treaty of 971, the Varangians reinforce their oath not only with Perun, but also with the Slavic deity Veles); this shows that the cult of Perun was also widespread in Scandinavia. It is likely that the purely Slavic god Perun replaced for them the Scandinavian Thor, also the thunderer.

The Finnic peoples had a deity Ukko, which had similar functions and attributes with the Slavic and Baltic deities.

== Characteristics ==
Gromoviti znaci or thunder marks are considered by some scholars as "ancient symbols of Perun", which are often engraved upon roof beams or over entries of village houses, to protect them from lightning bolts. Their circular shape symbolises ball lightning. Identical symbols were discovered on Slavic pottery of 4th century Chernyakhov culture.

Remains of an ancient shrine to Perun discovered in Peryn consisted of a wide circular platform centred around a statue, encircled by a trench with eight apses, which contained sacrificial altars and possibly additional statues. The overall plan of the shrine shows clear symbolism of the number nine. This is sometimes interpreted that Perun, in fact, had nine sons (or eight sons, with himself, the father, being the ninth Perun). In some Slavic folk songs, nine unnamed brothers are mentioned.

Similarly to Perkūnas of Baltic mythology, Perun was considered to have multiple aspects. In one Lithuanian song, it is said there are in fact nine versions of Perkūnas. From comparison to the Baltic mythology, and also from additional sources in Slavic folklore, it can also be shown that Perun was married to the Sun. He, however, shared his wife with his enemy Veles, as each night the Sun was thought of as diving behind the horizon and into the underworld, the realm of the dead over which Veles ruled.

Like many other Indo-European thunder gods, Perun's vegetative hypostasis was the oak, especially a particularly distinctive or prominent one. In South Slavic traditions, marked oaks stood on country borders; communities at these positions were visited during village holidays in the late spring and during the summer. Shrines of Perun were located either on top of mountains or hills, or in sacred groves underneath ancient oaks. These were general places of worship and sacrifices (with a bull, an ox, a ram, and eggs).

In addition to the tree association, Perun had a day association (Thursday) as well as the material association (tin).

== Post-Christian Perun ==
With the arrival of Christianity, the old gods fared poorly amongst the Slavs. Grand prince Vladimir the Great, who had once been a very vocal and lavish patron of Perun, converted to Christianity. In 988 he, his family and the people of the Kievan Rus' were collectively baptized. He ordered that the statues of Perun which he himself had erected formerly, be dethroned, torn down with great dishonor and dragged through the streets as they were beaten with sticks. The idols were then cast into rivers and not permitted to land on the shore. Three of Vladimir's sons are also recognized as saints.

== In neopaganism ==
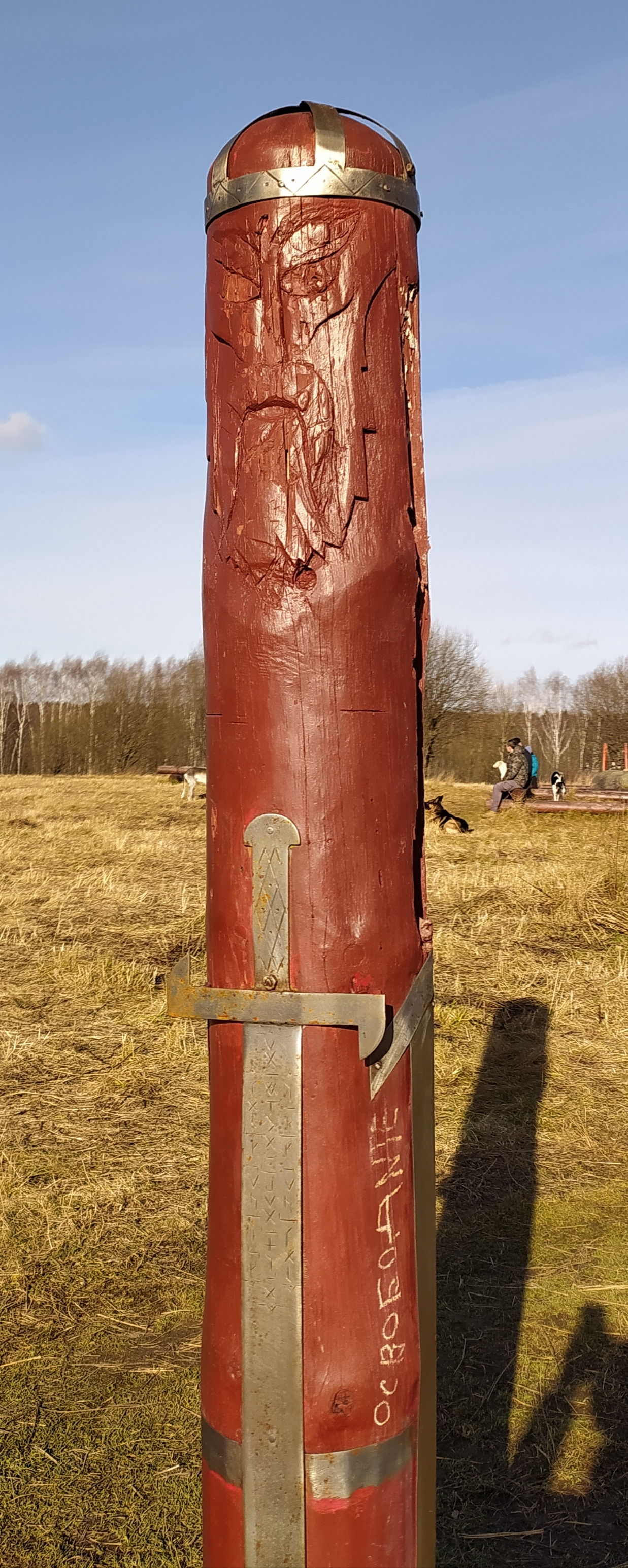
Neopagan idol of Perun, Bitsa Park, Moscow

Perun is one of the most revered gods in Slavic neopaganism (rodnovery). He is considered a thunderer, the god of warriors, and a rival of Veles, also embodying spring thunderstorms that fertilize the earth. Slavic neopaganism has two directions: the militant worshipers of Perun and the "nature-like" worshipers of Veles. In the neopagan interpretation, the struggle of St. George with the serpent is understood as the struggle of Perun with Veles, who stole cows from him. In the Book of Veles (recognized by scientists as a 20th-century fake), Svarog, Perun, and Svyatovit appear in the glorification of the Great Triglav.

According to the book Dezionization by Valery Yemelyanov, one of the founders of Russian neopaganism, in the ideas of the "Veneti" ("Aryans"), there was a "trinity of three triune trinities": Prav-Yav-Nav, Svarog-Perun-Svetovid, Soul-Flesh-Power.

In some currents, Perun may be the supreme patron god. Since 1992, the first neopagan Kupchinsky temple of Perun has been operating in St. Petersburg. The name of Perun is common in the names of neopagan associations (Izhevsk Slavic community "Children of Perun", Pyatigorsk Slavic community "Children of Perun", "Perun Community" in Krasnoyarsk Krai, Dnipropetrovsk community Sicheslavsky Natural icon "Perun's Sign" "Slavic Community of the Temple of the Wisdom of Perun" - the latter was part of the Ynglism movement). In Novokuznetsk, a "Slavic community" publishes the magazine Perun. The magazine Wrath of Perun was also published.

As part of the Slavic-Goritsa wrestling of Alexander Belov, the ideology is built on the cult of Perun, military honor, and valor and has many followers in Russia. In the Slavic-Goritsa wrestling, the fourth day of the week is dedicated to Perun. In Belov's calendar (1998), Gromovik (Perun's Day) falls on July 23. In Omsk, followers of Ynglism created an "Old Russian Temple" "Temple of the Veda of Perun", or "Temple of the Wisdom of Perun". V. V. Solokhin (Yarosvet) from the organization "Spiritual-ancestral Power of Rus'" (Astrakhan) held the "position" of "Minister of Perun".

== Legacy ==
=== Toponyms ===
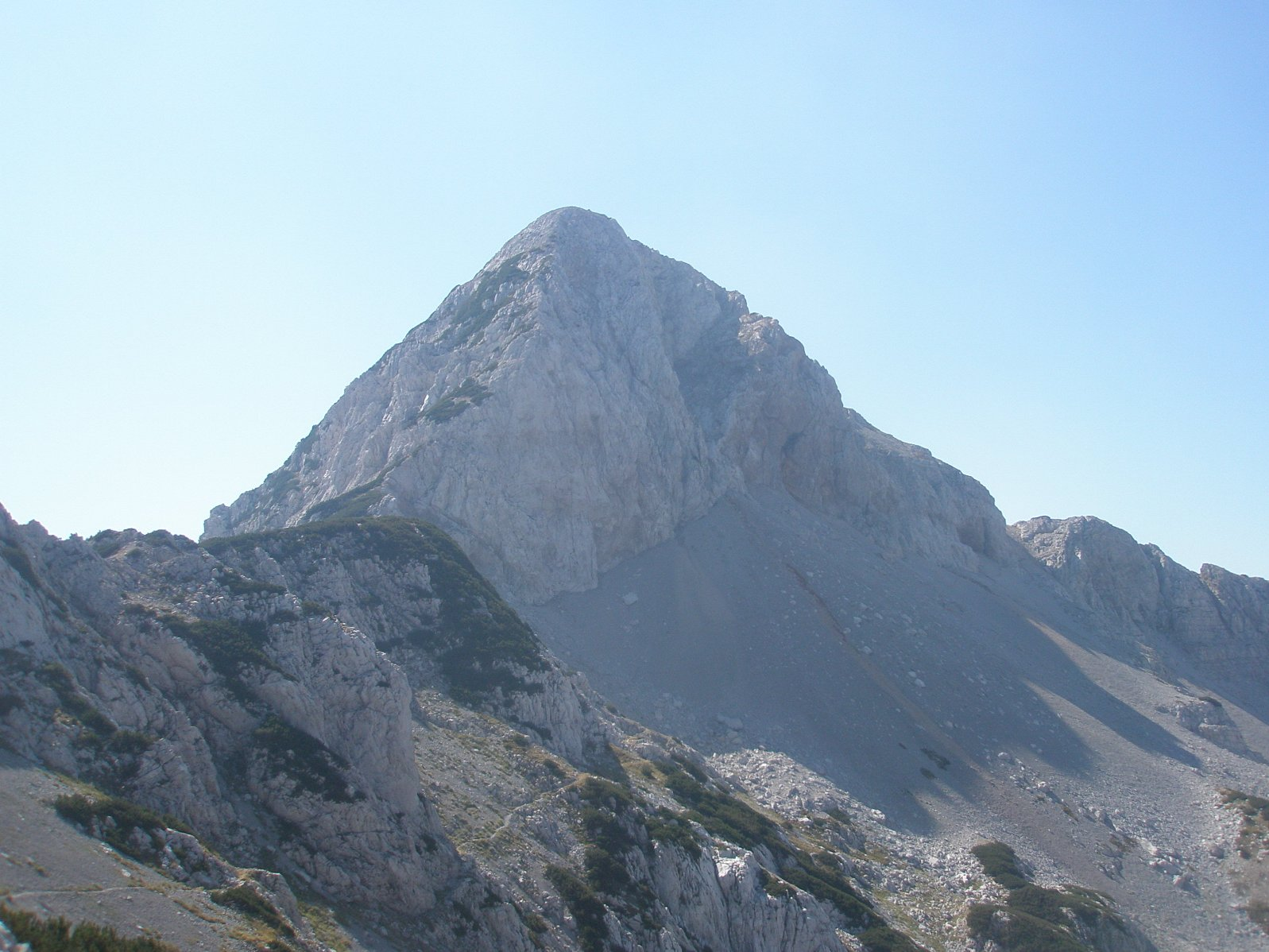
Summit of Prenj in Bosnia and Herzegovina, central Dinarides.

Moreover, the name of Perun is also commonly found in South Slavic toponymy. The Bulgarian and Macedonian people believe that the name of the Bulgarian mountain Pirin, one of the highest mountains of the Balkan Peninsula, was named after Perun. Perun is also the name of the hill in Podstrana next to Split, Croatia. There are also places called: Perun (the famous mountain in Bosnia Herzegovina, Vareš), Perunac, Perunovac, Perunika, Perunička Glava, Peruni Vrh, Perunja Ves, Peruna Dubrava, Perunuša, Perušice, Perudina and Perutovac. The word "Pero" means feather and the names of mountains and cities could refer to poultry. These names today mostly represent mountain tops, but in medieval times, large oaks, sacred groves and even entire villages or citadels were named Perun. Among South Slavs, a mountain plant Iris germanica is known in folklore as perunika ("Perun's plant") and sometimes also as bogisha ("god's plant"), and was believed to grow from ground that had been struck by lightning.

The Bulgarian people believe that the name of city Pernik is thought to have originated from that of Slavic god Perun with the Slavic placename suffix –nik (or –ik) added, and was first mentioned in the 9th century. The medieval town was a key Bulgarian stronghold during Bulgarian tsar Samuil's wars against the Byzantine Empire in the 11th century, when it was governed by the local noble Krakra of Pernik, withstanding Byzantine sieges a number of times.

Some places in Central Europe possibly named after Perun are the villages of Parndorf (formerly known as Perun) and Pernitz in the Parndorf Plain, Perná in Moravia, Beroun in Bohemia, and Pernek in Slovakia.

=== Onomastics ===
The Montenegrin surname Peruničić and the Macedonian Перуновски (Perunovski) are derived from Perun.

== See also ==
- List of thunder gods
- Zeus
- Thor
- Taranis
- Indra
- Leigong
- Susanoo-no-Mikoto
