= Proto-Indo-European thunder god =

Weather-god in Proto-Indo-European mythology

Equivalents
- Hindu: Indra
- Germanic: Thor
- Baltic: Perkūnas
- Slavic: Perun
- Finnic: Ukko
- Celtic: Taranis

A Proto-Indo-European thunder god, reconstructed as *Perkʷūnos (Proto-Indo-European: 'the Striker' or 'the Lord of Oaks'), was the weather god in Proto-Indo-European mythology. The deity is thought to be associated with fructifying rains, and his name was probably invoked in times of drought. In a widely attested Indo-European mythic pattern, the thunder-deity engages in combat with a multi-headed water-serpent in order to release the life-giving waters that had been confined or obstructed.

The Proto-Indo-European thunder god was often associated with the oak tree, probably because such tall trees are frequently struck by lightning. His domain may have been conceived as the forested mountains, designated as *Perkʷūnyós. A term for the sky, *h₂éḱmō, appears to have signified a "heavenly vault of stone" (comparable to the notion of firmament), but it could also denote a "stone-made weapon" (akin to a thunderstone). In this latter sense, the word was at times employed to refer specifically to the thunder-god's weapon. Another designation for his weapon, *mel-d-(n)-, can be reconstructed from the comparative traditions. The term originally denoted the "thunder-god's hammer" and, likely by semantic extension, has come to signify "lightning".

Contrary to other deities of the Proto-Indo-European pantheon, such as *Dyēus (the sky-god), or *H₂éwsōs (the dawn-goddess), widely accepted cognates stemming from the theonym *Perkʷūnos are only attested in Western Indo-European traditions. The linguistic evidence for the worship of a thunder god under the name *Perkʷūnos as far back as Proto-Indo-European times (4500–2500 BC) is therefore less secured.

== Name ==
=== Etymology ===
The name *Perkʷunos is generally regarded as stemming from the Proto-Indo-European (PIE) verbal root *per- ('to strike'). An alternative etymology is the PIE noun *pérkʷus ('the oak'), (Note: Various cognates can be found in the Latin oak-nymphs Querquetulanae (from quercus 'oak-tree'), the Germanic *ferhwaz ('oak'), the Gaulish erc- ('oak') and Quaquerni (a tribal name), the Punjabi pargāi ('sacred oak'), and perhaps in the Greek spring-nymph Herkyna.) attached to the divine nomenclature *-nos ('master of').

The theonym *Perkʷunos thus either meant "the Striker" or "the Lord of Oaks". A theory uniting those two etymologies has been proposed in the mythological association of oaks with thunder, suggested by the frequency with which such tall trees are struck by lightning.

The existence of a female consort is suggested by gendered doublet-forms such as those found in Old Norse Fjörgyn–Fjörgynn and Lithuanian Perkūnas–Perkūnija.

The noun *perkʷunos also gave birth to a group of cognates for the ordinary word "thunder", including Old Prussian percunis, Polish piorun ("thunderbolt"), Latvian pērkons ("thunder"), or Lithuanian perkūnas ("thunder") and perkūnija ("thunderstorm").

=== Epithets ===
Other Indo-European theonyms related to 'thunder', through another root *(s)tenh₂-, are thought to be found in the Germanic Þunraz (Thor), the Celtic Taranis (from an earlier *Tonaros), and the Latin epithet Tonans (attached to Jupiter). According to Peter Jackson, "they may have arisen as the result of fossilization of an original epithet or epiclesis" of Perkʷunos, since the Vedic weather-god Parjanya is also called stanayitnú- ("Thunderer").

Another possible epithet was *tr̥h₂wónts "conquering", from *térh₂uti "to overcome", with its descendants being Hittite god Tarḫunna, Luwian Tarḫunz, and Sanskrit तूर्वत् (tūrvat), epithet of a storm-god Indra. George E. Dunkel regarded Perkʷunos as an original epithet of Dyēus, the Sky-God. It has also been postulated that Perkʷunos was referred to as *Diwós Putlós ('son of Dyēus'), although this is based on the Vedic poetic tradition alone.

== Depiction ==
=== Weapon ===
Perkʷunos is usually depicted as holding a weapon, named *meld-n- in the Baltic and Old Norse traditions, which personifies lightning and is generally conceived as a club, mace, or hammer made of stone or metal. In the Latvian poetic expression Pērkōns met savu milnu ("Pērkōn throws his mace"), the mace (milna) is cognate with the Old Norse mjölnir, the hammer thrown by the thunder god Thor, and also with the word for 'lightning' in the Old Prussian mealde, the Old Church Slavonic *mlъni, or the Welsh mellt.

=== Fructifying rains ===
While his thunder and lightning had a destructive connotation, they could also be seen as a regenerative force since they were often accompanied by fructifying rains. Parjanya is depicted as a rain god in the Vedas, and Latvian prayers included a call for Pērkōns to bring rain in times of drought. The Balkan Slavs worshipped Perun along with his female counterpart Perperuna, the name of a ritual prayer calling for fructifying rains and centred on the dance of a naked virgin who had not yet had her first monthly period. The earth is likewise referred to as "menstruating" in a Vedic hymn to Parjanya, a possible cognate of Perperuna. The alternative name of Perperuna, Dodola, also recalls Perkūnas' pseudonym Dundulis, and Zeus' oak oracle located at Dodona.

Perëndi – a name that is used in Albanian for "god, sky", but considered by some scholars to be an Albanian thunder-god, cognate to Proto-Indo-European *Perkʷūnos – is especially invoked by Albanians in incantations and ritual songs praying for rain. Rituals were performed in times of summer drought to make it rain, usually in June and July, but sometimes also in the spring months when there was severe drought. In different Albanian regions, for rainmaking purposes, people threw water upwards to make it subsequently fall to the ground in the form of rain. This was an imitative type of magic practice with ritual songs.

A mythical multi-headed water-serpent is connected with the thunder-deity in an epic battle. The monstrous foe is a "blocker of waters", and his heads are eventually smashed by the thunder-deity to release the pent-up torrents of rain. The myth has numerous reflexes in mythical stories of battles between a serpent and a god or mythical hero, who is not necessarily etymologically related to *Perkʷunos, but always associated with thunder. For example, the Vedic Indra and Vṛtra (the personification of drought), the Iranian Tištry/Sirius and Apaoša (a demon of drought), the Albanian Drangue and Kulshedra (an amphibious serpent who causes streams to dry up), the Armenian Vahagn and Vishap, the Greek Zeus and Typhoeus as well as Heracles and the Hydra, Heracles and Ladon and Apollo and Python, or the Norse Thor and Miðgarðsormr.

=== Striker and god of oaks ===
The association of Perkʷunos with the oak is attested in a range of formulaic expressions from the Balto-Slavic languages, such as Lithuanian Perkūno ąžuolas (Perkūnas's oak), Latvian Pērkōna uōzuōls ('Pērkōn's oak'), and Old Russian Perunovŭ dubŭ ('Perun's oak'). Slavic tradition records that the thunder-god Perūn frequently strikes oaks in order to kindle fire within them, while in Norse mythology the thunder-god Thor is said to smite giants when they seek refuge beneath an oak. Thor himself is also associated with at least one sacred oak dedicated to his cult. According to Belarusian folklore, Piarun created the first fire by striking a tree in which the Demon had concealed himself. The nexus between striking, stone, and fire may reflect the empirical observation that fire can be produced by striking stones together. The act of producing fire through a strike—paralleled in the belief that oak trees retain latent fire after being struck by the thunder-god—may underscore the symbolic role of lightning in the myth of creation.

The striking of devils, demons, or evildoers by Perkʷunos is another motif in the myths surrounding the Baltic Perkūnas and the Vedic Parjanya. In Lithuanian and Latvian folkloric material, Perkunas/Perkons is invoked to protect against snakes and illness.

=== Wooded mountains ===
Perkʷunos appears to have been closely associated with wooded mountains, which may have been perceived as his natural realm. This connection is supported by reflexes of *perkʷun(i)yo- / *perkʷun(i)yā- in the name of the Hercynian Forest (Gaulish (h)ercunia '[oaks] forests') and in the Germanic *fergunja ('[mountainous] forest'). In Germanic mythology, Fjörgynn was used as a poetic synonym for 'the land, the earth', and she could have originally been the mistress of the wooded mountains, the personification of what appears in Gothic as fairguni ('wooded mountain').

A comparable development is found in Old Church Slavonic prěgynja and Old Russian peregynja, both meaning 'wooded hill', although these forms may reflect early borrowings from Germanic. The Old Russian chronicles record the presence of wooden idols of Perūn on hills overlooking Kiev and Novgorod, while both the Belarusian Piarun and the Lithuanian Perkūnas were traditionally said to inhabit lofty mountaintops. In Lithuanian, such places are called perkūnkalnis, literally the 'summit of Perkūnas', and in the Slavic sphere the term perynja referred to the hill over Novgorod where Perun's sanctuary was located. According to the chronicles, Prince Vladimir the Great ordered the idol of Perūn to be cast into the Dnieper during the Christianization of Kievan Rus'. Baltic sources further mention a perpetual sacred fire dedicated to Perkūnas, fuelled by oakwood in the forests or on hilltops. Pagans believed that Perkūnas would freeze if Christians extinguished those fires. Collectively, these parallels suggest a long-standing Indo-European tradition that linked the thunder-god with forested highlands and mountain sanctuaries.

Words from a stem *pér-ur- are also attested in the Hittite pēru ('rock, cliff, boulder'), the Avestan pauruuatā ('mountains'), as well as in the Sanskrit goddess Parvati and the epithet Parvateshwara ('lord of mountains'), attached to her father Himavat.

=== Stony skies ===
A term for the sky, *h₂ekmōn, denoted both 'stone' and 'heaven', possibly a 'heavenly vault of stone' akin to the biblical firmament. The motif of the stony skies can be found in the story of the Greek Akmon ('anvil'), the father of Ouranos and the personified Heaven. The term akmon was also used with the meaning 'thunderbolt' in Homeric and Hesiodic diction. Other cognates appear in the Vedic áśman ('stone'), the Iranian deity Asman ('stone, heaven'), the Lithuanian god Akmo (mentioned alongside Perkūnas himself), and also in the Germanic *hemina (German: Himmel, English: heaven) and *hamara (cf. Old Norse: hamarr, which could mean 'rock, boulder, cliff' or 'hammer'). Akmo is described in a 16th-century treatise as a saxum grandius, 'a sizeable stone', which was still worshipped in Samogitia.

Albanians believed in the supreme powers of thunder-stones (kokrra e rrufesë or guri i rejës), which were believed to be formed during lightning strikes and to be fallen from the sky. Thunder-stones were preserved in family life as important cult objects. It was believed that bringing them inside the house could bring good fortune, prosperity and progress in people, in livestock and in agriculture, or that rifle bullets would not hit the owners of the thunder-stones. A common practice was to hang a thunder-stone pendant on the body of the cattle or on the pregnant woman for good luck and to counteract the evil eye.

The mythological association can be explained by the observation (e.g., meteorites) or the belief that thunderstones (polished ones for axes in particular) had fallen from the sky. Indeed, the Vedic word áśman is the name of the weapon thrown by Indra, Thor's weapon is also called hamarr, and the thunder-stone can be named Perkūno akmuõ ('Perkuna's stone') in the Lithuanian tradition. Scholars have also noted that Perkūnas and Piarun are said to strike rocks instead of oaks in some themes of the Lithuanian and Belarusian folklores, and that the Slavic Perūn sends his axe or arrow from a mountain or the sky. The original meaning of *h₂ekmōn could thus have been 'stone-made weapon', then 'sky' or 'lightning'.

== Evidence ==
=== Theonyms ===
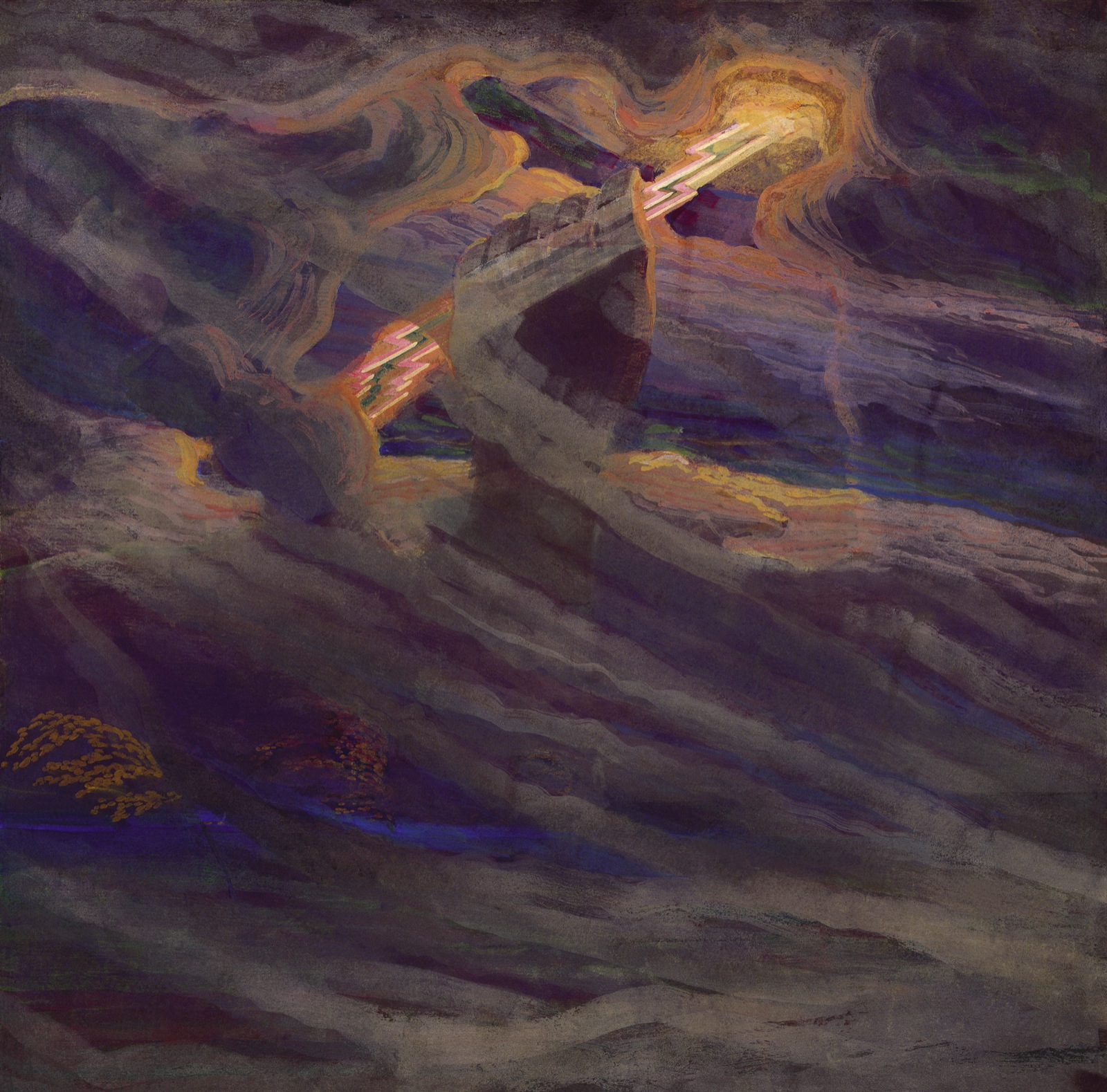
The Hand of Perkūnas by Mikalojus Konstantinas Čiurlionis (1909). Note that Perkʷunos should be represented with a thunderstone, as the depiction of the hand holding the thunderbolt is of Near Eastern origin.

The following deities are cognates stemming from *Perkʷunos or related names in Western Indo-European mythologies:

- PIE: *per-, 'to strike' (or *pérkʷus, the 'oak'),
  - PIE: *per-kʷun-os, the weather god,
    - Baltic:
      - Yotvingian: Parkuns (or Parcuns),
      - Latgalian: Pārkiuņs (ltg);
      - Lithuanian: Perkūnas, the god of rain and thunder, depicted as an angry-looking man with a tawny beard,
      - Latvian: Pērkōns, whose functions are occasionally merged with those of Dievs (the sky-god) in the Latvian dainas (folk songs),
      - Percunatele or Perkunatele, a female deity associated with Perkunas, as mother or wife;
  - PIE: *per-uh₁n-os, the 'one with the thunder stone',
    - Slavic: *perunъ
      - Old Church Slavonic: Perūn (Перýн), the 'maker of the lightning',
      - Old East Slavic: Perunŭ, Belarusian: Piarun (Пярун), Czech: Peraun,
      - Slovak: Perún; Parom; (Note: According to Louis Léger, Kott's German-Czech dictionary cited Slovak alternate forms Baram and Param, as well as verb peruntati "frapper de la foudre" and adjective perunský "qui a rapport à la foudre".)
      - Bulgarian: Perun (Перун);
      - Polish: Piorun ("lightning");
      - Russian: Peryn, a peninsula in Novgorod, Russia, connected to a historical worship of Slavic Perun.
      - South Slavic: Perun
  - PIE: *per-kʷun-iyo (feminine *per-kʷun-iyā, the 'realm of Perkʷunos', i.e. the [wooded] mountains),
    - Celtic: *ferkunyā,
      - Gaulish: the Hercynian (Hercynia) forest or mountains, ancient name of the Ardennes and the Black Forest, which was also known as Arkunia by the time of Aristotle; Hercuniates ('Ερκουνιατες; attached to the suffix -atis 'belonging to'), the name of a Celtic tribe from Pannonia, as described by Pliny and Ptolemy.
    - Germanic: *fergunja, meaning 'mountain', perhaps 'mountainous forest' (or the feminine equivalent of *ferga, 'god'),
      - Old Norse: Fjörgyn, the mother of the thunder-god Thor, the goddess of the wooded landscape and a poetic synonym for 'land' or 'the earth',
      - Gothic: fairguni (𐍆𐌰𐌹𐍂𐌲𐌿𐌽𐌹), '(wooded) mountain', and fairhus, 'world', Old English: firgen, 'mountain', 'wooded hill',
      - Old High German: Firgunnea, the Ore Mountains, and Virgundia Waldus, Virgunnia, 'oaks forest',
    - Slavic: *per(g)ynja, 'wooded hills' (perhaps an early borrowing from Germanic),
      - Old Church Slavonic: prӗgynja, Old East Slavic: peregynja, 'wooded hills'; Polish: przeginia (toponym),

=== Thunder-god's weapon ===
The name of Perkʷunos' weapon *meld-n- is attested by a group of cognates alternatively denoting 'hammer' or 'lightning' in the following traditions:

- PIE: *melh₂-, 'to grind',
  - Northern PIE: *mel-d-(n)-, 'thunder-god's hammer > lightning',
    - Germanic: *melðunija,
      - Old Norse: mjǫllnir, the hammer of Thor; cf. also myln, 'fire',
    - Balto-Slavic: *mild-n-,
      - Slavic: *mlъldni,
        - Old Church Slavonic: mlъni or mlъnii, Serbo-Croatian: múnja (муња), Slovene mółnja, Bulgarian: мълния, Macedonian: молња, 'lightning',
        - Russian: mólnija (молния), 'lightning', Ukrainian maladnjá (dial.) 'lightning without thunder', Belarusian: маланка, 'lightning'; East Belarusian (dial.) maladnyá, 'lightning';
        - Czech: mlna (arch.), Polish mełnia (dial.), Lusatian: milina (arch.) 'lightning' (modern 'electricity'),
      - Baltic: *mildnā,
        - Old Prussian: mealde, 'lightning bolt',
        - Latvian: milna, the 'hammer of the Thunderer', Pērkōns,
    - Celtic: *meldo-,
      - Gaulish: Meldos, an epithet of thunder divinity Loucetios; as well as Meldi (*Meldoi), a tribal name, and Meldio, a personal name.
      - Welsh: mellt, 'lightning, thunderbolts' (sing. mellten, 'bolt of lightning'), and Mabon am Melld or Mabon fab Mellt ('Mabon son of Mellt'),
      - Breton: mell, 'hammer',
      - Middle Irish: mell, 'rounded summit, small hill', possibly via semantic contamination from *ferkunyā, '(wooded) mountains'.

Another PIE term derived from the verbal root *melh₂- ('to grind'), *molh₁-tlo- ('grinding device'), also served as a common word for 'hammer', as in Old Church Slavonic mlatъ, Latin malleus, and Hittite malatt ('sledgehammer, bludgeon').

19th-century scholar Francis Hindes Groome cited the existence of the Romani word malúna as a loanword from Slavic molnija. The Komi word molńi or molńij ('lightning') has also been borrowed from Slavic.

=== Heavenly vault of stone ===
- PIE: *h₂eḱ-, 'sharp',
  - PIE: *h₂éḱmōn (gen. *h₂ḱmnós; loc. *h₂ḱméni), 'stone, stone-made weapon' > 'heavenly vault of stone',
    - Indo-Aryan: *Haćman,
      - Vedic: áśman, 'stone, sling-stone, thunderbolt',
      - Avestan: asman, 'stone, sling-stone, heaven',
    - Greek: ákmōn (ἄκμων), 'anvil, meteoric stone, thunderbolt, heaven',
    - Balto-Slavic: *akmen-,
      - Lithuanian: akmuõ, 'stone',
      - Latvian: akmens, 'stone',
    - Germanic: *hemō (gen.*hemnaz, dat. *hemeni), 'heaven',
      - Gothic: himins, 'heaven',
      - Old English: heofon, Old Frisian: himel, Old Saxon: heƀan, Old Dutch: himil, Old High German: himil, 'heaven',
      - Old Norse: himinn, 'heaven',

A metathesized stem *ḱ(e)h₂-m-(r)- can also be reconstructed from Slavic *kamy ('stone'), Germanic *hamaraz ('hammer'), and Greek kamára ('vault').

=== Other possible cognates ===
- Paleo-Balkanic:
  - Albanian:
    - Perëndi "god, deity, sky", considered by some scholars to be an Albanian sky and thunder god (from per-en-, an extension of PIE *per-, 'to strike', attached to -di, the sky-god Dyēus, thus related to *per-uhₓn-os (see above); although the Albanian perëndoj, 'to set (of the sun)', from Latin parentare, 'a sacrifice (to the dead), to satisfy', has also been proposed as the origin of the theonym,
  - Greek: keraunos (κεραυνός), the name of Zeus's thunderbolt, which was sometimes also deified (by metathesis of *per(k)aunos; although the root *ḱerh₂-, 'shatter, smash' has also been proposed), and the Herkyna spring-nymph, associated with a river of the same name and identified with Demeter (the name could be a borrowing as it rather follows Celtic sound laws),
  - Thracian: Perkos/Perkon (Περκος/Περκων), a horseman hero depicted as facing a tree surrounded by a snake. His name is also attested as Ήρω Περκω and Περκώνει "in Odessos and the vicinities".
- Indo-Iranian:
  - Vedic: Parjanya, the god of rain, thunder and lightning (although Sanskrit sound laws rather predict a parkūn(y)a form; an intermediate form *pergʷenyo- has therefore been postulated, possibly descending from *per-kʷun-(y)o-).
  - Nuristani: Pärun (or Pērūneî), a war god worshipped in Kafiristan (present-day Nuristan Province, Afghanistan),
  - Persian: Piran (Viseh), a heroic figure present in the Shahnameh, the national epic of Greater Iran; it has been suggested his name might be related to the Slavic deity Perun,
- Celtic *(h)erku- ('oak'),
  - Hispano-Celtic: Erguena (ERGVENA), a personal name thought to mean 'oak-born' (*pérkʷu-genā) or to derive from *pérkʷu-niya 'wooded mountain'.
  - Celtiberian: berkunetakam ('Perkunetaka'), a word attested in the Botorrita Plate I and interpreted as a sacred oak grove.
  - Pyrenees: the theonym Expercennius, attested in an inscription found in Cathervielle and possibly referring to an oak god. His name might mean 'six oaks'.
  - Gaulish: ercos ('oak'),
    - Gallo-Roman: references to 'Deus Ercus' (in Aquitania), 'Nymphae Percernae' (Narbonensis), and a deity named 'Hercura' (or Erecura) which appears throughout the provinces of the Roman Empire. Patrizia de Bernardo Stempel argues that Aerecura/Hercura derives from a Celtic *perk^{(w)}ura.
  - Irish: Erc (mac Cairpri), mentioned at the end of Táin Bó Cúailnge, and placed on the throne of Tara by Conchobar mac Nessa in Cath Ruis na Ríg for Bóinn; although an alternative etymology from PIE *perk- ('color') > *perk-no ('[spotted] fish') has been proposed by Hamp and Matasović.
- Hittite: the words perunas and peruni are attested in a Hittite text of The Song of Ullikummi, and refer to a female being made of 'Rock' or 'Stone' who gives birth to a rocky creature.
- Italic:
  - Italian: porca, a word meaning 'fir tree' in the Trentino dialect. Mallory and Adams suppose it is a loanword from Raetic.
- Slavic
  - Pomeranian: Porenut, Latinized as Porenutius in the work of Saxo Grammaticus. The name is believed to refer to a deity worshipped in the port city of Rügen in ancient times as a possible son of Perun.
  - (?) Perperuna, figure invoked in rainmaking in Southeast Europe, which is of obscure etymology, but considered by some as a reduplicated feminine derivative from Perun's name, which would parallel the Old Norse couple Fjörgyn–Fjörgynn and the Lithuanian Perkūnas–Perkūnija,
- Romano-Germanic: inscriptions to the Matronae 'Ala-ferhuiae' found in Bonn, Altdorf, or Dormagen.
- Caucasus: it has been suggested that the characters Пиръон (Piryon) and Пиръа (Pirya) may attest the presence of the thunder god's name in the Caucasus.

== Legacy ==
Louis Léger stated that the Polabians adopted Perun as their name for Thursday (Perendan or Peräunedån), which is likely a calque of German Donnerstag.

Some scholars argue that the functions of the Luwian and Hittite weather gods Tarḫunz and Tarḫunna ultimately stem from those of Perkʷunos. Anatolians may have dropped the old name in order to adopt the epithet *Tṛḫu-ent- ('conquering', from PIE Proto-Indo-European: *terh₂-, 'to cross over, pass through, overcome'), which sounded closer to the name of the Hattian Storm-god Taru. According to scholarship, the name Tarhunt- is also cognate to the Vedic present participle tū́rvant- ('vanquishing, conquering'), an epithet of the weather-god Indra.

=== Toponyms ===
Near Salona, in Late Antiquity, there was a hill named Perun. Likewise, the ancient oronym Borun (monte Borun) has been interpreted as a deformation of the theonym Perun. Their possible connection is further reinforced by the proximity of a mountain named Dobrava, a widespread word in Slavic-speaking regions that means 'oak grove'.

Places in South-Slavic-speaking lands are considered to be reflexes of Slavic god Perun, such as Perunac, Perunovac, Perunika, Perunićka Glava, Peruni Vrh, Perunja Ves, Peruna Dubrava, Perunuša, Perušice, Perudina, and Perutovac. Scholar Marija Gimbutas cited the existence of the place names Perunowa gora (Poland), Perun Gora (Serbia), Gora Perun (Romania), and Porun hill (Istria). Patrice Lajoye associates place names in the Balkans with the Slavic god Perun: the city of Pernik and the mountain range Pirin (in Bulgaria). He also proposes that the German city of Pronstorf is also related to Perun, since it is located near Segeberg, whose former name was Perone in 1199.

The name of the Baltic deity Perkunas is also attested in Baltic toponyms and hydronyms: a village called Perkūniškės in Žemaitija, north-west of Kaunas, and the place name Perkunlauken ('Perkuns Fields') near modern Gusev.

== See also ==
- Indo-European smith god
