= Sister-wife of Njörðr =

Norse mythological character

In Norse mythology, the sister-wife of Njörðr is the unnamed twin sister and first wife of the god Njörðr, the mother of the deities Freyr and Freyja, and one of the Vanir. This shadowy goddess is attested to in the Poetic Edda poem Lokasenna, recorded in the 13th century by an unknown source, and the Heimskringla book Ynglinga saga, a euhemerized account of the Norse gods composed by Snorri Sturluson also in the 13th century but based on earlier traditional material. The figure receives no further mention in Old Norse texts.

The situation is further complicated in that narratives describing the birth of Freyr and Freyja contradictorily cite the birth of the siblings occurring either after or before Njörðr left Vanaheimr to live among the Æsir. In addition, Freyr is referred to as the "son" of Njörðr and the goddess Skaði in the Poetic Edda poem Skírnismál.

In his first-century work Germania, Tacitus describes rituals surrounding a goddess by the name of Nerthus, a theonym that is etymologically ancestral to Old Norse Njörðr. However, the figure described by Tacitus is female. Based on this scholars have suggested a Proto-Germanic hermaphroditic deity or a gender aspectual pair (similar to Freyja and Freyr), identified the obscure Old Norse goddess name Njörun as a potential name for the otherwise unnamed goddess, and in some cases identified a potential reflex of a narrative about Njörðr and his sister-wife in Saxo Grammaticus's 12th-century work Gesta Danorum.

== Textual background ==
In a euhemerized account of the gods in Ynglinga saga chapter 4, Snorri Sturluson characterizes Freyr and Freyja as the children of Njörðr by his unnamed sister, to whom he was married by Vanir custom:

Old Norse

Þá er Njǫrðr var með Vǫnum, þá hafði hann átta systur sína, því at þat váru þar lǫg; váru þeira bǫrn Freyr ok Freyja.

Lee M. Hollander translation (1992)

While Njorth lived with the Vanir he had his sister as wife, because that was the custom among them. Their children were Freyr and Freyja.

In the Eddic poem Lokasenna, Loki also states that Njörðr had Freyr by his sister:

Old Norse

við systor þinni
gaztu slíkan mǫg

Ursula Dronke translation (1997)

on your sister
you begot such a son

In contrast, in the Gylfaginning section of his Prose Edda, after telling the story of Njörðr's unhappy marriage to Skaði that occurred after he came to live among the Æsir, Snorri states that Freyr and Freyja were born after that; Freyr is also presented as the son of Njörðr and Skaði in the Eddic poem Skírnismál. However, in Ynglinga saga Freyr, and presumably Freyja, accompanies Njörðr when he comes to live with the Æsir as a hostage after the Æsir–Vanir War; and Lokasenna alludes to Freyja having been "surprised" in Vanic incest with her brother.

== Scholarly interpretation ==
Scholars since Jacob Grimm have regarded the chronology in Ynglinga saga as more likely to be original and taken Freyr and Freyja as having been therefore born to Njörðr by an unmentioned Vanic wife. Jan de Vries suggested a remnant of ancient Indo-European custom. Since Nerthus in Tacitus' late-1st century Germania is an earth goddess, terra mater (mother earth), but her name is etymologically identical to his, the suggestion is that there was originally a hermaphroditic deity, or more likely that they were a married twin pair, parallel to Freyr and Freyja. Georges Dumézil pointed out that in Saxo Grammaticus' Gesta Danorum, the hero Hadingus' life closely parallels Njörðr's, including a relationship with his foster-sister Harthgrepa followed by marriage to a princess who chooses him by his feet, as Skaði does in Gylfaginning. Grimm suggested that Freyja was thought of as the daughter of the female Nerthus and Freyr as the son of the male Njörðr. It is possible that the goddess' name survives in the uncharacterized Njörun who appears in some skaldic kennings and in the Nafnaþulur that were later appended to the Prose Edda; other divine pairs with similarly differentiated names in the Old Norse corpus are Freyr and Freyja, Fjörgynn and Fjörgyn or Ullr and Ullinn in the Old High German.
