= Njörun =

Norse deity

In Norse mythology, Njörun (Old Norse: Njǫrun [ˈnjɔron], sometimes modernly anglicized as Niorun) is a goddess attested in the Prose Edda, written in the 13th century by Snorri Sturluson, and various kennings (including once in the Poetic Edda). Scholarly theories concerning her name and function in the pantheon include etymological connections to the Norse god Njörðr and the Roman goddess Nerio, and suggestions that she may represent the earth or be the unnamed sister-wife of Njörðr.

== Attestations ==
Njörun is listed (after Bil) as an ásynja within the Prose Edda book Skáldskaparmál. No further information other than her name is provided there. In addition, the name occurs in kennings for women in poetry by Kormákr Ögmundarson, Hrafn Önundarson and Rögnvaldr Kali as well as in Krákumál and verses in Íslendinga saga, Njáls saga and Harðar saga. Eld-Njörun (meaning "fire-Njörun") occurs in women kennings in poetry by Gísli Súrsson and Björn Breiðvíkingakappi while hól-Njörun occurs in a somewhat dubious kenning in a stanza by Björn hítdælakappi. Draum-Njörun (meaning "dream-Njörun") is cited in the Poetic Edda poem Alvíssmál as a word from the language of the dwarfs for the night. The same word occurs in Nafnaþulur.

== Theories ==
Njörun is a "mysterious ... figure" of whom nothing else is known; Andy Orchard suggests that she may be fictitious. Several scholars have suggested that the stem syllable in her name, Njǫr-, may represent the element *ner- as in Tacitus' earth-goddess Nerthus (*Ner-þuz), whose name is etymologically identical with that of the Norse god Njǫrðr, and that Njörun may therefore be a name for the earth. Ásgeir Blöndal Magnússon additionally suggests a connection with the Roman goddess Nerio.

The possible etymological connection with Njǫrðr and Nerthus suggests that Njörun may be a preserved name for the sister-wife of Njörðr, who is highly unusual in the Old Norse context in being unnamed. As was noted by Albert Morey Sturtevant, Njǫrun and Gefjon are the only female names recorded in Old Norse texts that have the suffix -un. Two other god and goddess pairs distinguished by suffix are preserved in the Old Norse corpus: Freyr and Freyja, Fjörgyn and Fjörgynn or Ullr and Ullinn.
