= Axe of Perun =

Slavic religious pendants

Axes of Perun, also called "hatchet amulets", are archaeological artifacts worn as a pendant and shaped like a battle axe in honor of Perun, the supreme deity of Slavic religion. They are counterparts to Nordic Mjolnir amulets. They are mostly found in modern-day Serbia, Russia, Ukraine, Belarus, Poland, Lithuania, Latvia and parts of Scandinavia. Connection with the Slavic pre-Christian god Perun was made by V. P. Darkevich, although some authors prefer the association with Norse material culture.

== Amulet description ==
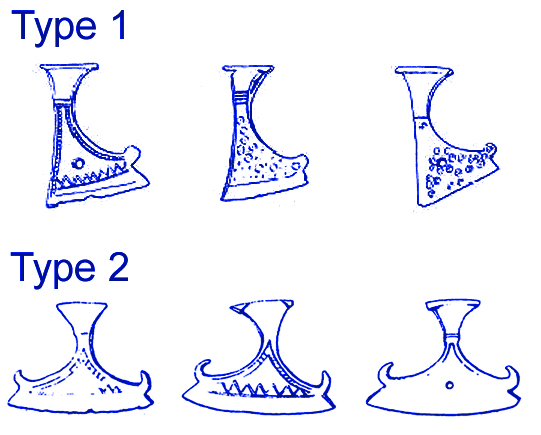
Drawings of Slavic axe amulets based on archaeological findings dating between the 11th and 12th century.

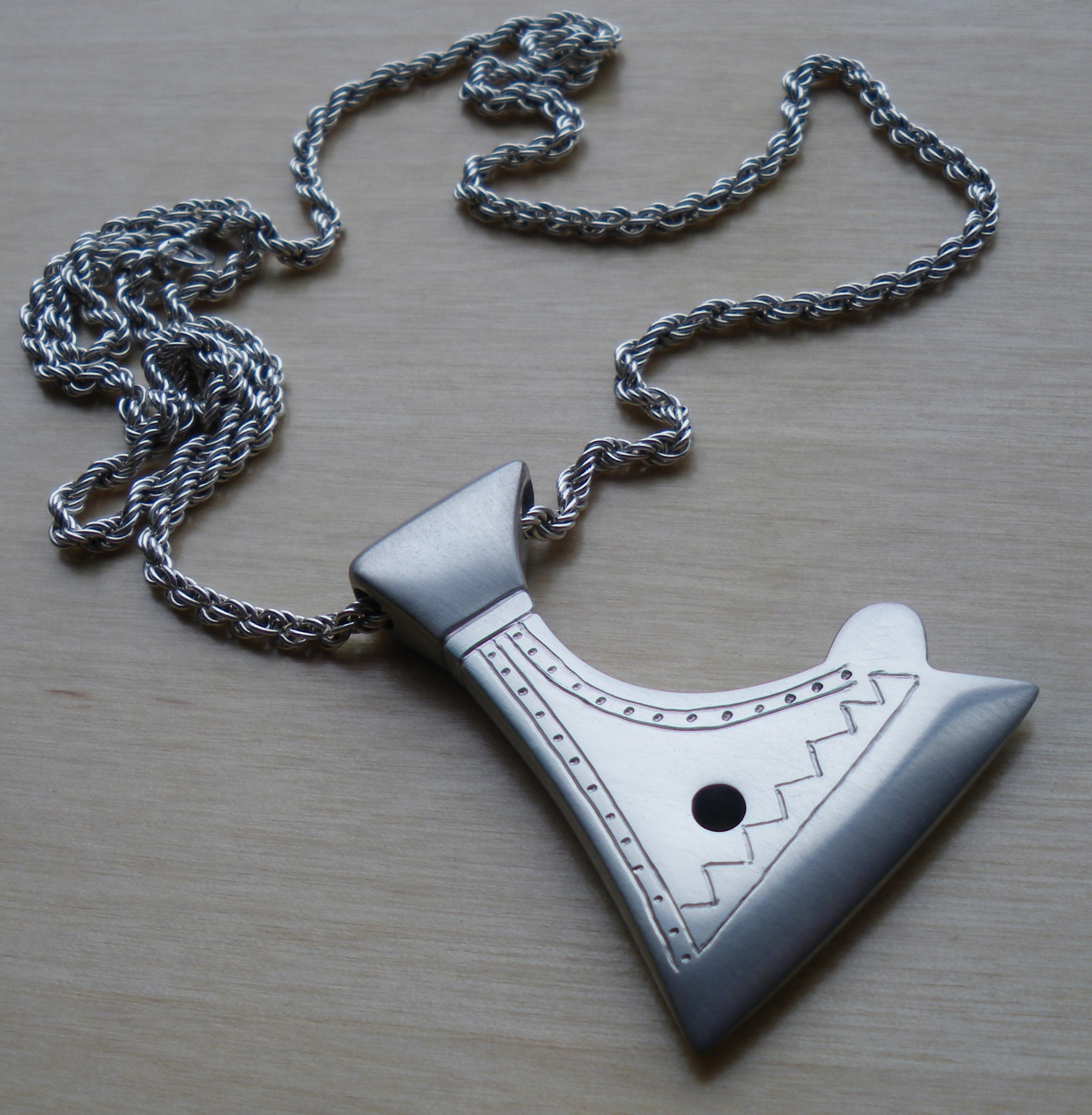
Modern day "Axe of Perun" amulet based on a finding from the Khazar fortress Sarkel (Саркел), excavated in the 1930s. The Kievan Rus' controlled the fortress from 965 until the 12th century.

The axes range in length from 4 to 5.5 cm (1.6 to 2.2 in), and blade width from 2.8 to 4 cm (1.1 to 1.6 in). Bronze is the most common material of their construction. Most have been dated between the 11th and 12th century, and over 60 specimens have been collected.

Two basic designs of the axe have been found throughout Russia and its boundaries.

Specimens of both designs include a hole in the centre of the blade, and both have been decorated with zigzag lines, representing lightning or more likely imitating inlaid ornamentation patterns of real axes, near the edge of the blade.

Type 1
The first type is a bearded axe (lower side of the blade is elongated) with a flat upper side. It resembles a battle axe. A knob-like protrusion is usually present on the lower side of the axe. These axes have been decorated with circles, believed to represent celestial bodies.

Type 2
The second type is distinguished by its symmetrical shape and broad blade. Similar to the knob of the first type, the second has two horn-like protrusions diametrically opposite on the upper and lower side.

== See also ==
- Slavic Native Faith
- Slavic paganism
- Perun
- Veles (god)
