= Kalvarienberg (nature reserve) =

Nature reserve in Burgenland, Austria

Coordinates: 47.943073°N 16.860842°E

- IUCN category III (natural monument or feature)
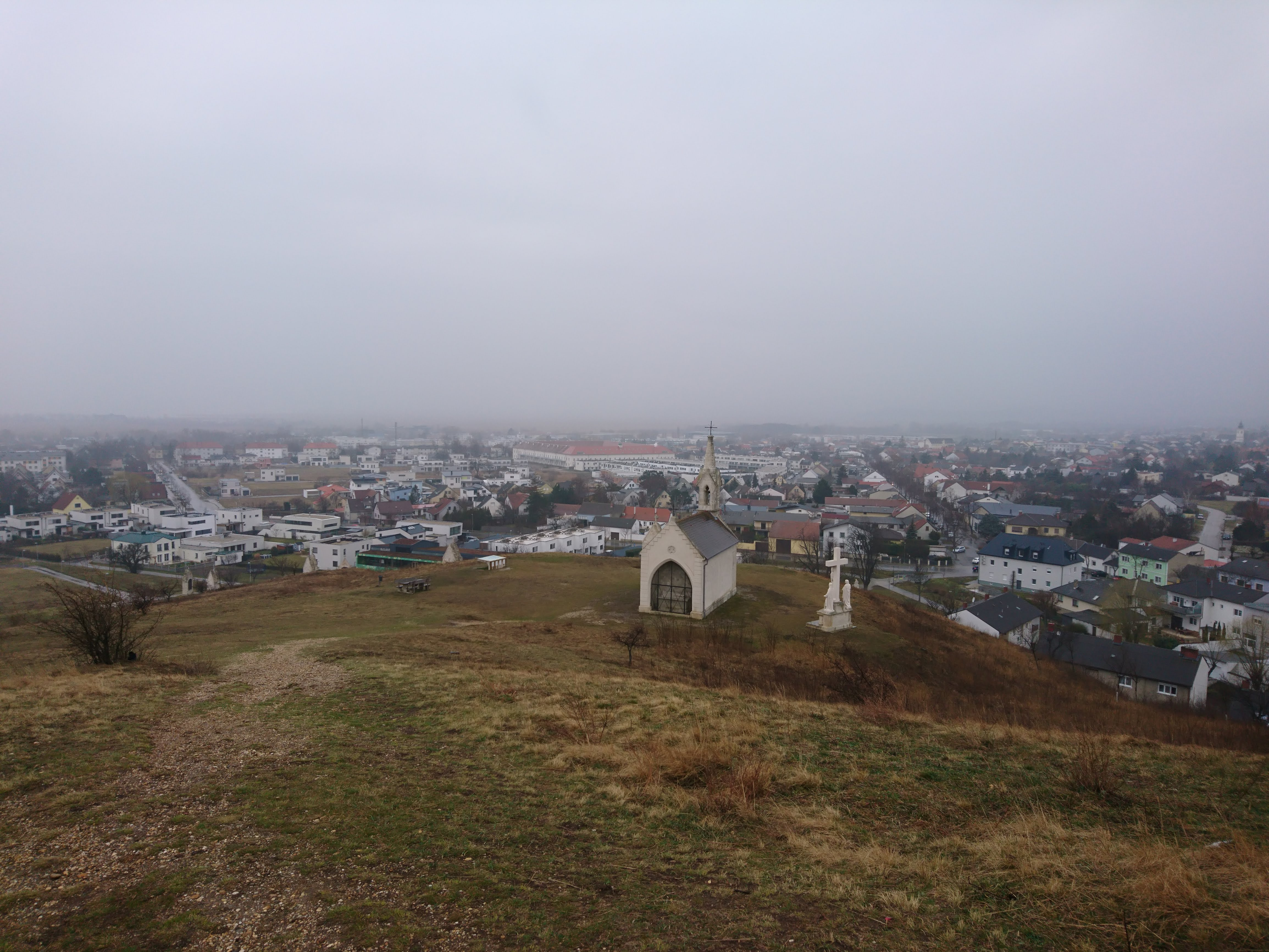
- Kalvarienberg
- Interactive map of Kalvarienberg
- Established: 2018

Kalvarienberg is a nature monument in Neusiedl am See in the state of Burgenland, Austria. The nature monument covers the steep south-eastern slope of the Parndorf Plain, the Wagram.

== Description ==
Botanically speaking the area is formed by a pannonian Tragant-needle grassbiotop. The dry grasslands of the Kalvarienberg were declared a nature monument on May 17, 2018. The area is a popular recreational area for both inhabitants of Neusiedl am See and tourists visiting the Lake Neusiedl area. Every year the Neusiedl am See village and the state Burgenland invest about 10.000 euro for the management of the dry grasslands at this site.

== Flora ==
In the protected area various species occur, including Adonis vernalis, Iris pumila, Allium flavum, Anthericum ramosum, Linum austriacum and Veronica spicata.
