= Fjörgyn and Fjörgynn =

Norse mythical characters

Fjörgyn (or Jörð; Old Norse 'earth') is a personification of earth in Norse mythology, and the mother of the thunder god Thor, the son of Odin. The masculine form Fjörgynn is portrayed as the father of the goddess Frigg, the wife of Odin.

Both names appear in the Poetic Edda, compiled in the 13th century from earlier traditional sources, and in the Prose Edda, written in the 13th century by Snorri Sturluson. A number of theories surround the names and they have been the subject of scholarly discourse.

== Name ==
=== Etymology ===
The Old Norse name Fjörgyn is used as a poetic synonym for 'land' or 'the earth' in skaldic poems. It stems from Proto-Germanic *fergunja, meaning 'mountain', perhaps 'mountainous forest', which may ultimately derive from Proto-Indo-European *per-k^{w}un-iyā ('the realm of Perk^{w}unos'; i.e., the wooden mountains). Fjörgyn is cognate with the Gothic fairguni (𐍆𐌰𐌹𐍂𐌲𐌿𐌽𐌹), the Old English firgen, both meaning 'mountain', and with the Old High German Firgunnea, the Ore Mountains. Alternatively, the name may be a feminine equivalent of *ferga, meaning 'god'.

=== Alternative names ===
Scholars argue that Fjörgyn may simply be another name for Jörð, whose name also means 'earth'. The fact that she does not appear elsewhere as a goddess in skaldic poetry "as would be expected of a purely literary alternative to Jörð" may be also notable.

== Attestations ==
Fjörgyn (feminine) is attested in Völuspá in the kenning "Fjörgyn’s son" for Thor, and in Hárbarðsljóð as the mother of Thor.

So keep to the left on the road, until you find Verland;
There Fjörgyn will find Thor, her son,
And she will teach him the ways of kinsmen to Odin’s lands.

— Snorri Sturluson, Hárbardsljód, 56, trans. J. Lindow, 2002.

In both Gylfaginning (9) and Skáldskaparmál (19), Fjörgynn (masculine) is depicted as the father of Frigg. In Lokasenna ('Loki's flyting'), Loki is responding to Frigg:

Shut up, Frigg! You are Fjörgynn’s daughter
and have ever been most eager for men...

— Snorri Sturluson, Lokasenna, 26, trans. J. Lindow, 2002.

== Theories ==
=== Divine pair ===
Hilda Ellis Davidson theorizes that Fjörgyn and Fjörgynn may have represented a divine pair of which little information has survived, along with figures such as the theorized Ullr and Ullin, Njörðr and Nerthus, and the attested Freyr and Freyja.

=== Proto-Indo-European origin ===
Theories have been proposed that Fjörgyn (Proto-Germanic: *fergunja) may represent an extension of an earlier Proto-Indo-European thunder or rain god *Perk^{w}unos due to Indo-European linguistic connections between Norse Fjörgyn, the Lithuanian god Perkūnas, the Slavic god Perun and, perhaps, the Vedic rain god Parjanya.

== See also ==
- Perkwunos
