= Jupiter Tonans =

Roman god depiction

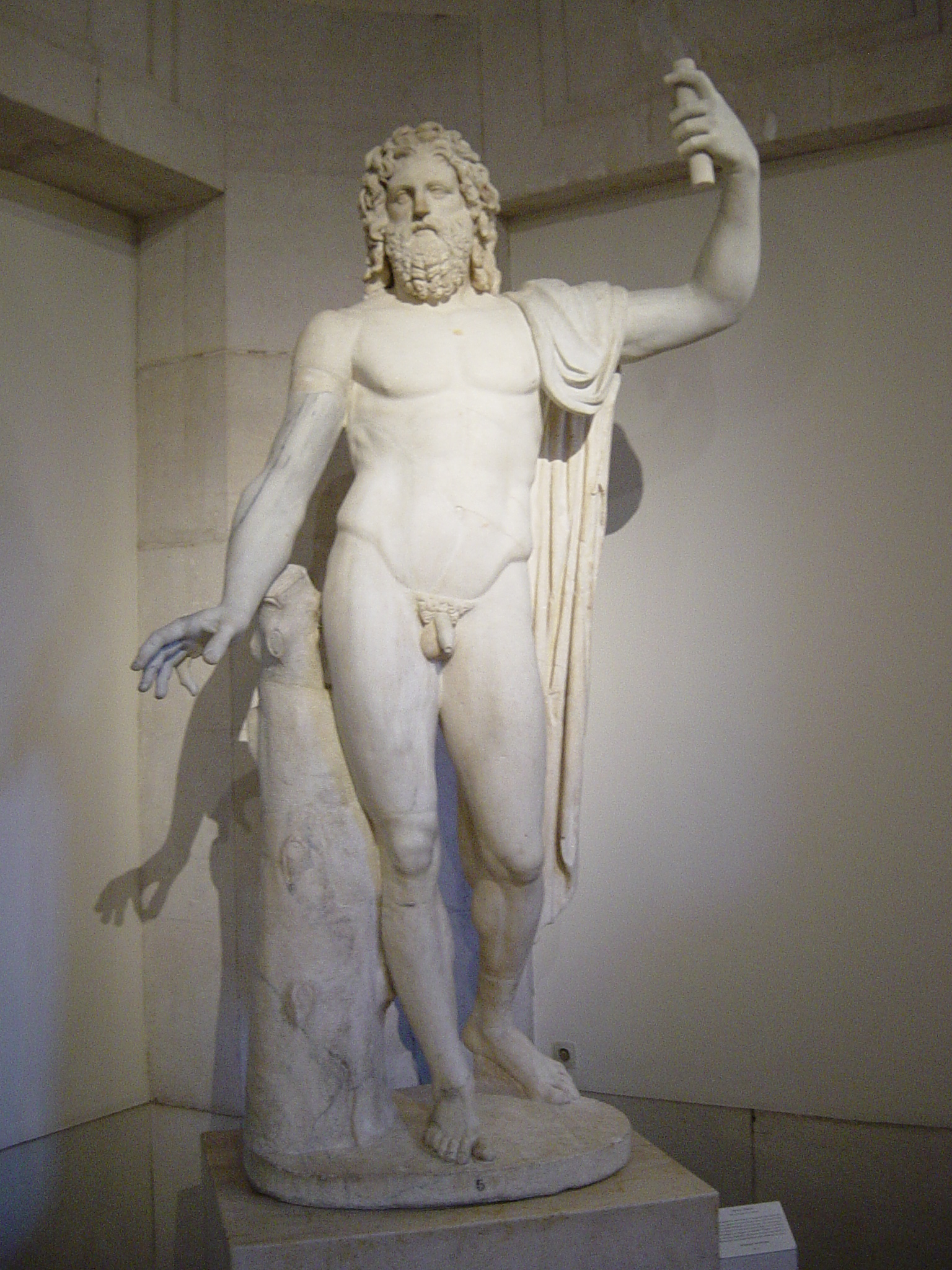
Jupiter Tonans, possibly reflecting the cult image of the temple of Jupiter Tonans in Rome (Spanish Royal collection, Prado)

Jupiter Tonans (Latin: Ivppiter Tonans, lit. 'Thundering Jove') was the aspect (numen) of Jupiter venerated in the Temple of Jupiter Tonans, which Augustus vowed in 26 BCE and dedicated in 22 BCE on the Capitoline Hill; the Emperor had narrowly escaped being struck by lightning during the campaign in Cantabria. An old temple in the Campus Martius had long been dedicated to Iuppiter Fulgens ("Lightning Jupiter"). The original cult image installed in the sanctuary by its founder was by Leochares, a Greek sculptor of the 4th century BCE.

In the 1st century, Vitruvius observed (De architectura I.2.5) the propriety or decorum required for temples of Jupiter Tonans, that they are to be hypaethral or open to the sky. The 1st-century poet Lucan also mentions the Temple of Jupiter Tonans in Rome (De Bello Civili II.34).

The sculpture at the Prado (illustration) is considered to be a late 1st-century replacement commissioned by Domitian. The Baroque-era restoration of the arms has given Jupiter a baton-like scepter in his raised hand.
