= Parndorf Plain =

Coordinates: 47°57′N 16°56′E

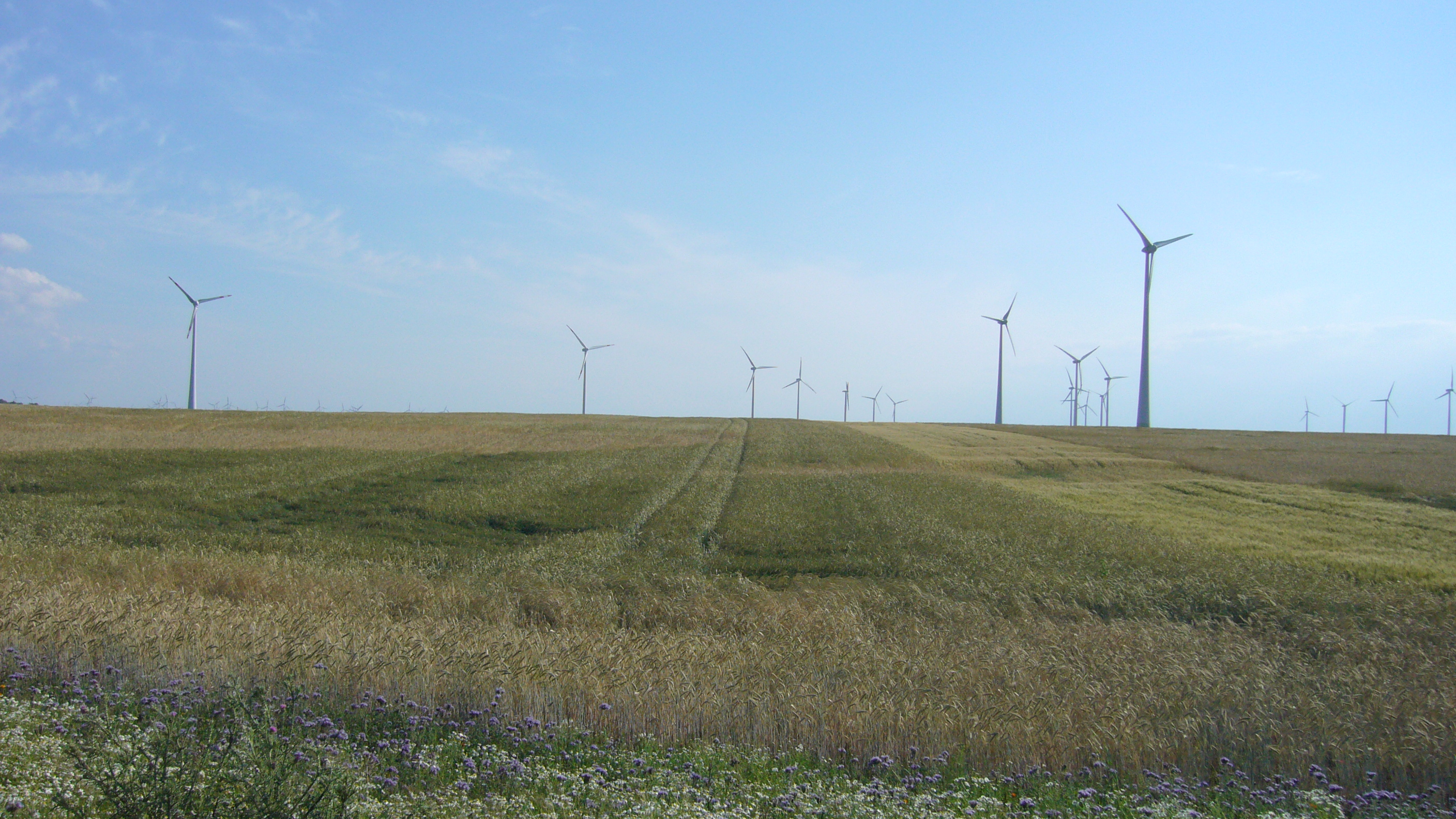

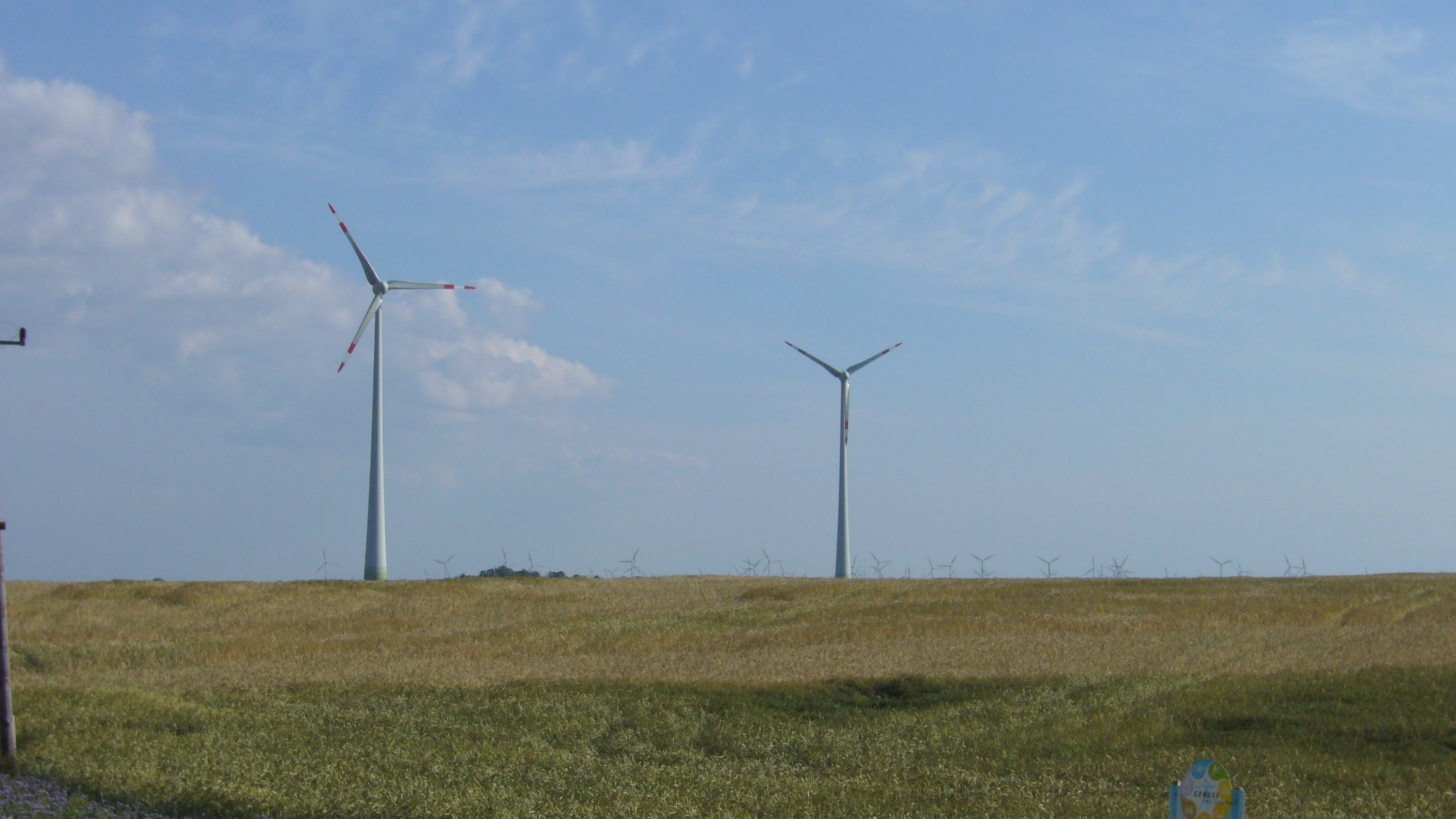

Parndorf Plain (German: Parndorfer Platte, Hungarian: Parndorfi-fennsík, Pándorfalvi-fennsík, Slovak: Parndorfská plošina), also called Parndorf Heath (German: Parndorfer Heide) is a geographic area and plain in the northern part of Burgenland, Austria and western Hungary. The plain is effectively an old-alluvial fan of the river Danube.

The plain is at an altitude of 160–180 m, area approx. 200 square kilometres (77 sq mi), with terraced gravel deposited by the River Danube during the Ice Age, situated between Lake Neusiedl and the Leitha Mountains in the southwest and Lower Leitha in the northeast. An almost treeless plain, it is about 30 metres (98 ft) higher than its surroundings, without any rivers or streams. Partly heath land with Pannonian flora and partly arable land. Wine growing on the steep loess slopes facing Lake Neusiedl. All towns are situated at the foot of the scarps.

Large-scale dairy farming takes place in the area.

The East railway line and the A4 autobahn (opened in Autumn 1994) run through the Parndorf plain. Draw-wells give the landscape a puszta character; Roman roads.

Parndorf Plain is among the windiest areas in inland Europe. The almost continuous reign of the north-easterly wind is occasionally interrupted by a gusty south-easterly. On the plain of the Parndorfer Platte the biggest modern wind farms in Austria have been set up.

== See also ==
- Parndorf (Hungarian: Pándorfalu, Pándorfalva), Zurndorf, Nickelsdorf, Rohrau, Potzneusiedl, Gattendorf
- Heide·boden (area of Deutsch Jahrndorf)
- Leithagebirge
- See·winkel (Hungarian: Fertő·zug)
- Hanság (German: Waasen, Wasen)
- Vienna Basin
- Little Alföld, (Great-) Alföld, Puszta, Pannonian Basin
- Győr-Moson-Sopron County
- Sziget·köz
- Kalvarienberg
