= Parjanya =

Deity of rain in Hinduism

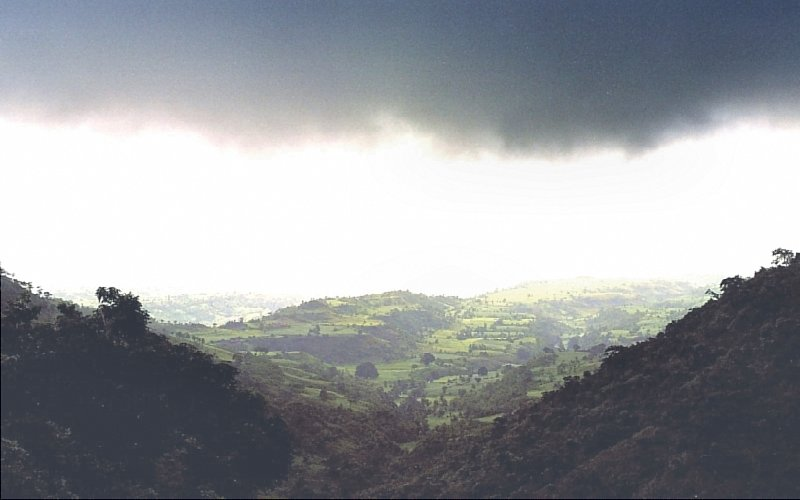
Rana Pratap Sagar Dam

Parjanya (Sanskrit: पर्जन्य, IAST: parjánya) according to the Vedas is a deity of rain, thunder, lightning, and the one who fertilizes the earth. It is another epithet of Indra, the Vedic deity of the sky and heaven.

== Description ==
It is assumed Parjanya is the udder and lightning is the teats of the rain-cow; accordingly, rain represents her milk. Also, he is sometimes considered as a rain-bull controlled by the superior Indra. The thunder is his roar. He is the father of arrow or reed which grows rapidly in the rainy season. He is also considered as a protector of enlightenment seekers and an enemy of flesh-eating fire.

== Meanings ==
According to his 1965 Sanskrit–English Dictionary, Vaman Shivram Apte gives the following meanings:

- Rain-cloud, thunder cloud, a cloud in general;
- Rain (as referred in the Shloka from Bhagavad Gita Chapter 3 Verse 14);
- The god (deva) of rain i.e. Indra.

== In hymns ==
Sing forth and laud Parjanya, son of Heaven, who sends the gift of rain.
May he provide our pasturage.
Parjanya is the God who forms in kine, in mares, in plants of earth,
And womankind, the germ of life.
Offer and pour into his mouth oblation rich in savoury juice:
May he for ever give us food.

— Rigveda 7.102 (tr. Ralph T. H. Griffith, 1896)

Three hymns of the Rigveda, 5.83, 7.101 and 7.102, are dedicated to Parjanya. In Vedic Sanskrit Parjanya means "rain" or "raincloud". Prayers dedicated to Parjanya, to invoke the blessings of rains are mentioned in the Atharvaveda. Parjanya was also one of the Saptarishi (Seven Great Sages Rishi) in the fifth Manvantara. He is one of the 12 Adityas and according to the Vishnu Purana, the guardian of the month of Kartik, a Gandharva and a Rishi in the Harivamsa.

== Similar deities ==
The deity can be identified with various other Indo-European Gods such as Slavic Perun, Lithuanian Perkūnas, Latvian Pērkons and Finnish Perkele "god of thunder", Gothic fairguni "mountain", and Mordvin language Pur'ginepaz.

== Rig Veda hymns to Parjanya ==
RV 5.83 in the translation of Jamison and Brereton:

1 áchā vada tavásaṃ gīrbhír ābhí stuhí parjányaṃ námasâ vivāsa
kánikradad vṛṣabhó jīrádānū réto dadhāty óṣadhīṣu gárbham
Address the powerful one with these hymns. Praise Parjanya. With reverence seek to entice him here.
The constantly roaring bull of lively drops deposits his semen as embryo in the plants.

2 ví vṛkṣân hanty utá hanti rakṣáso víśvam bibhāya bhúvanam mahâvadhāt
utânāgā īṣate vŕṣṇyāvato yát parjánya stanáyan hánti duṣkŕtaḥ
He smashes apart the trees and also smashes the demons. All creation fears him who has the mighty weapon.
And (even) the blameless one shrinks from the one of bullish powers, when Parjanya, thundering, smashes those who do ill.

3 rathîva káśayâśvāṁ abhikṣipánn āvír dūtân kṛṇute varṣyāaàṁ áha
dūrât siṁhásya stanáthā úd īrate yát parjányaḥ kṛṇuté varṣyàṃ nábhaḥ
Like a charioteer lashing out at his horses with a whip, he reveals his rain-bearing messengers.
From afar the thunderings of the lion rise up, when Parjanya produces his rain-bearing cloud.

4 prá vâtā vânti patáyanti vidyúta úd óṣadhīr jíhate pínvate svàḥ
írā víśvasmai bhúvanāya jāyate yát parjányaḥ pṛthivîṃ rétasâvati
The winds blow forth; the lightning bolts fly. The plants shoot up; the sun swells.
Refreshment arises for all creation, when Parjanya aids the earth with his semen

5 yásya vraté pṛthivî nánnamīti yásya vraté śaphávaj járbhurīti
yásya vratá óṣadhīr viśvárūpāḥ sá naḥ parjanya máhi śárma yacha
At whose commandment the earth bobs up and down, at whose commandment the hoofed (livestock) quivers,
at whose commandment the plants take on all forms—you, Parjanya— extend to us great shelter.

6 divó no vṛṣṭím maruto rarīdhvam prá pinvata vŕṣṇo áśvasya dhârāḥ
arvâṅ eténa stanayitnúnéhy apó niṣiñcánn ásuraḥ pitâ naḥ
Grant us rain from heaven, o Maruts; make the streams of the bullish stallion swell forth.
(Parjanya,) come nearby with this thundering, pouring down the waters as the lord, our father.

7 abhí kranda stanáya gárbham â dhā udanvátā pári dīyā ráthena
dŕtiṃ sú karṣa víṣitaṃ nyàñcaṃ samâ bhavantūdváto nipādâḥ
Roar! Thunder! Set an embryo! Fly around with your water-bearing chariot.
Drag the water-skin unleashed, facing downward. Let uplands and lowlands become alike.

8 mahântaṃ kóśam úd acā ní ṣiñca syándantāṃ kulyâ víṣitāḥ purástāt
ghṛténa dyâvāpṛthivî vy ùndhi suprapāṇám bhavatv aghnyâbhyaḥ
The great bucket—turn it up, pour it down. Let the brooks, unleashed, flow forward.
Inundate Heaven and Earth with ghee. Let there be a good watering hole for the prized cows.

9 yát parjanya kánikradat stanáyan háṁsi duṣkŕtaḥ
prátīdáṃ víśvam modate yát kíṃ ca pṛthivyâm ádhi
When, o Parjanya, constantly roaring, thundering you smash those who do ill,
all of this here, whatever is on the earth, rejoices in response.

10a ávarṣīr varṣám úd u ṣû gṛbhāyâkar dhánvāny átyetavâ u
10c ájījana óṣadhīr bhójanāya kám utá prajâbhyo 'vido manīṣâm
You have rained rain: (now) hold it back. You have made the wastelands able to be traversed.
You have begotten the plants for nourishment, and you have found (this?) inspired thought for the creatures.

== Buddhism ==
Parjanya also features is Buddhist literature. In the Pali Canon of the Theravāda, he is known as Pajjuna.

He is king of the vassavalāhaka devas who have limited control over the clouds and weather. He has a daughter named Kokanadā.
