= Priyanka =

Priyanka is a popular female given name in Hindu and Buddhist cultures. It is a name derived from the Sanskrit word 'Priyankera' or 'Priyankara', meaning someone or something that is sweet, dayan, lovable, or her presence makes the place more happy and the one who has lovely eyes (priya ank). In its adverb form it can also mean endearing behavior, for example an act of showing kindness or happiness or excitement; or kind agree-ability. Occasionally the name is given to boys.

The Sanskrit word Priyankara is also used to describe the white variety of the 'Kantakari' flower (Sweta kantakari). Some of the earliest mentions of the Kantakari flower can be found in the ancient Hindu Ayurveda text from the mid-second millennium BCE.

== Notable people ==
- Priyanka (drag queen), winner of season 1 of Canada's Drag Race
- Priyanka Bassi, Indian television actress
- Priyanka Chaturvedi (born 1979), spokesperson of All India Congress Committee
- Priyanka Chopra (born 1982), Indian actress, singer and Miss World 2000
- Priyanka Deshpande (born 1992), Indian television presenter
- Priyanka Dutt (born 1984), Indian film producer
- Priyanka Gandhi (born 1972), Indian politician
- Priyanka Jawalkar (born 1992), Indian actress
- Priyanka Karki, Nepalese actress
- Priyanka Kothari (born 1983), Bollywood actress
- Priyanka Mohan (born 1994), Indian actress
- Priyanka Nair (born 1985), Malayalam actress
- Priyanka Nalkari (born 1994), Indian film and television actress
- Priyanka Sarkar, Bengali film and television actress
- Priyanka Shah, Indian actress
- Priyanka Singh (born 1990), Indian singer
- Priyanka Singh Rawat, politician from Bhartiya Janata Party
- Priyanka Upendra, Indian actress also known as Priyanka Trivedi
- Priyanka Xi (born 1991), New Zealand actress
- Priyanka Yoshikawa, Miss Japan, 2016

== Other uses ==
- Priyanka (1994 film), 1994 Tamil drama film
- Priyanka (2016 film), 2016 Kannada drama film

== See also ==
- Priya (given name)
