= Proto-Indo-European mythology =

Trundholm sun chariot, Nordic Bronze Age, c. 1600 BC

Proto-Indo-European mythology is the body of myths and deities associated with the Proto-Indo-Europeans. Although the mythological motifs are not directly attested – since Proto-Indo-European speakers lived in preliterate societies – scholars of comparative mythology have reconstructed details from inherited similarities in mythological concepts found in Indo-European languages, based on the assumption that parts of the Proto-Indo-Europeans' original belief systems survived in the daughter traditions. (Note: West 2007, p. 2: "If there was an Indo-European language, it follows that there was a people who spoke it: not a people in the sense of a nation, for they may never have formed a political unity, and not a people in any racial sense, for they may have been as genetically mixed as any modern population defined by language. If our language is a descendant of theirs, that does not make them 'our ancestors', any more than the ancient Romans are the ancestors of the French, the Romanians, and the Brazilians. The Indo-Europeans were a people in the sense of a linguistic community. We should probably think of them as a loose network of clans and tribes, inhabiting a coherent territory of limited size. ... A language embodies certain concepts and values, and a common language implies some degree of common intellectual heritage.")

The Proto-Indo-European pantheon includes a number of securely reconstructed deities, which in various Indo-European traditions have cognate names (linguistic siblings from a common origin) and are associated with similar attributes and myths. These include *Dyḗws Ph₂tḗr, the daylight-sky god; his consort *Dʰéǵʰōm, the earth mother; his daughter *H₂éwsōs, the dawn goddess; his sons the Divine Twins; a solar deity *Seh₂ul; and a moon deity *Meh₁not. Some deities, like the weather god *Perkʷunos or the herding-god *Péh₂usōn, (Note: Mallory and Adams saw a possible connection with Paoni, dative form of Pan in the Arcadian Greek dialect, and personal names Puso (Venetic or Gaulish) and Pauso (Messapic).) are only attested in limited geographic regions—Western (i.e. European) and Graeco-Aryan, respectively—and could therefore represent late additions that were unknown in other Indo-European cultures.

Some myths are also securely dated to Proto-Indo-European times, since they feature both linguistic and thematic evidence of an inherited motif: a story portraying a mythical figure associated with thunder and slaying a multi-headed serpent to release torrents of pent-up water; a creation myth involving two brothers, one of whom sacrifices the other in order to create the world; and probably the belief that the Otherworld was guarded by a watchdog and could only be reached by crossing a river.

Various schools of thought exist regarding possible interpretations of the reconstructed Proto-Indo-European mythology. The main mythologies used in comparative reconstruction are Indo-Iranian, Baltic, Roman, Norse, Celtic, Greek, Slavic, Hittite, Armenian, and Albanian.

== Methods of reconstruction ==
=== Schools of thought ===
The mythology of the Proto-Indo-Europeans is not directly attested and it is difficult to match their language to archaeological findings related to any specific culture from the Chalcolithic. Nonetheless, scholars of comparative mythology have attempted to reconstruct aspects of Proto-Indo-European mythology based on the existence of linguistic and thematic similarities among the deities, religious practices, and myths of various Indo-European peoples. This method is known as the comparative method. Different schools of thought have approached the subject of Proto-Indo-European mythology from different angles.

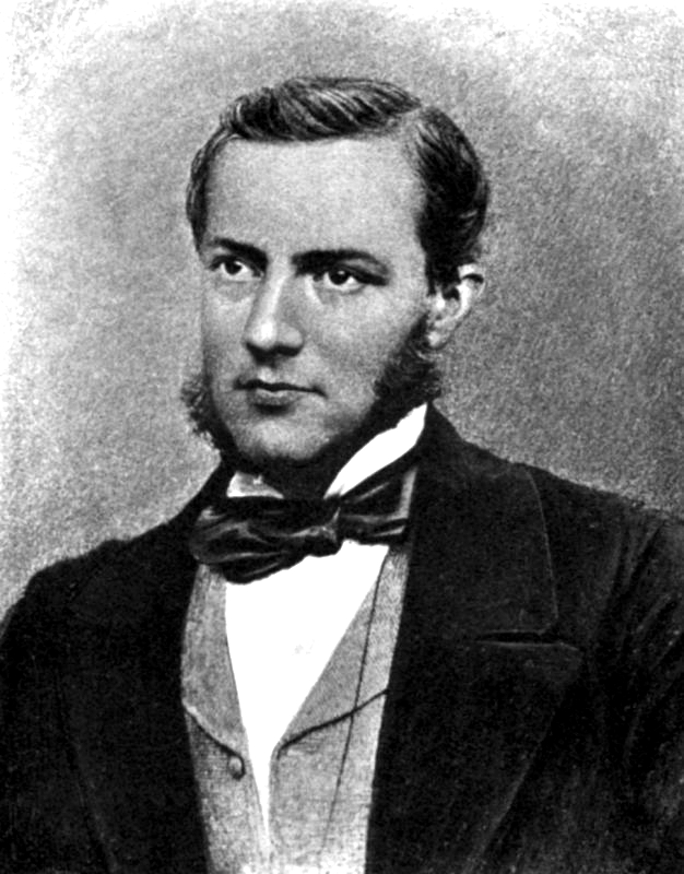
Friedrich Max Müller, a prominent early scholar on the reconstruction of Proto-Indo-European religion and a proponent of the Meteorological School.

The Meteorological or Naturist School holds that Proto-Indo-European myths initially emerged as explanations for natural phenomena, such as the Sky, the Sun, the Moon, and the Dawn. Rituals were therefore centered around the worship of those elemental deities. This interpretation was popular among early scholars, such as Friedrich Max Müller, who saw all myths as fundamentally solar allegories. Although recently revived by some scholars like Jean Haudry and Martin L. West, this school lost most of its scholarly support in the late nineteenth and early twentieth centuries.

The Ritual School, which first became prominent in the late nineteenth century, holds that Proto-Indo-European myths are best understood as stories invented to explain various rituals and religious practices. Scholars of the Ritual School argue that those rituals should be interpreted as attempts to manipulate the universe in order to obtain its favours. This interpretation reached the height of its popularity during the early twentieth century, and many of its most prominent early proponents, such as James George Frazer and Jane Ellen Harrison, were classical scholars. Bruce Lincoln, a contemporary member of the Ritual School, argues for instance that the Proto-Indo-Europeans believed that every sacrifice was a reenactment of the original sacrifice performed by the founder of the human race on his twin brother.

The Functionalist School, by contrast, holds that myths served as stories reinforcing social behaviours through the meta-narrative justification of a traditional order. Scholars of the Functionalist School were greatly influenced by the trifunctional system proposed by Georges Dumézil, which postulates a tripartite ideology reflected in a threefold division between a clerical class (encompassing the religious and social functions of the priests and rulers), a warrior class (connected with the concepts of violence and bravery), and a class of farmers or husbandmen (associated with fertility and craftsmanship), on the basis that many historically known groups speaking Indo-European languages show such a division. Dumézil's theory had a major influence on Indo-European studies from the mid-20th century onwards, and some scholars continue to operate under its framework, although it has also been criticized as aprioristic and too inclusive, and thus impossible to be proved or disproved.

The Structuralist School argues that Proto-Indo-European mythology was largely centered around the concept of dualistic opposition. They generally hold that the mental structure of all human beings is designed to set up opposing patterns in order to resolve conflicting elements. This approach tends to focus on cultural universals within the realm of mythology rather than the genetic origins of those myths, such as the fundamental and binary opposition rooted in the nature of marriage proposed by Tamaz V. Gamkrelidze and Vyacheslav Ivanov. It also offers refinements of the trifunctional system by highlighting the oppositional elements present within each function, such as the creative and destructive elements both found within the role of the warrior.

=== Source mythologies ===
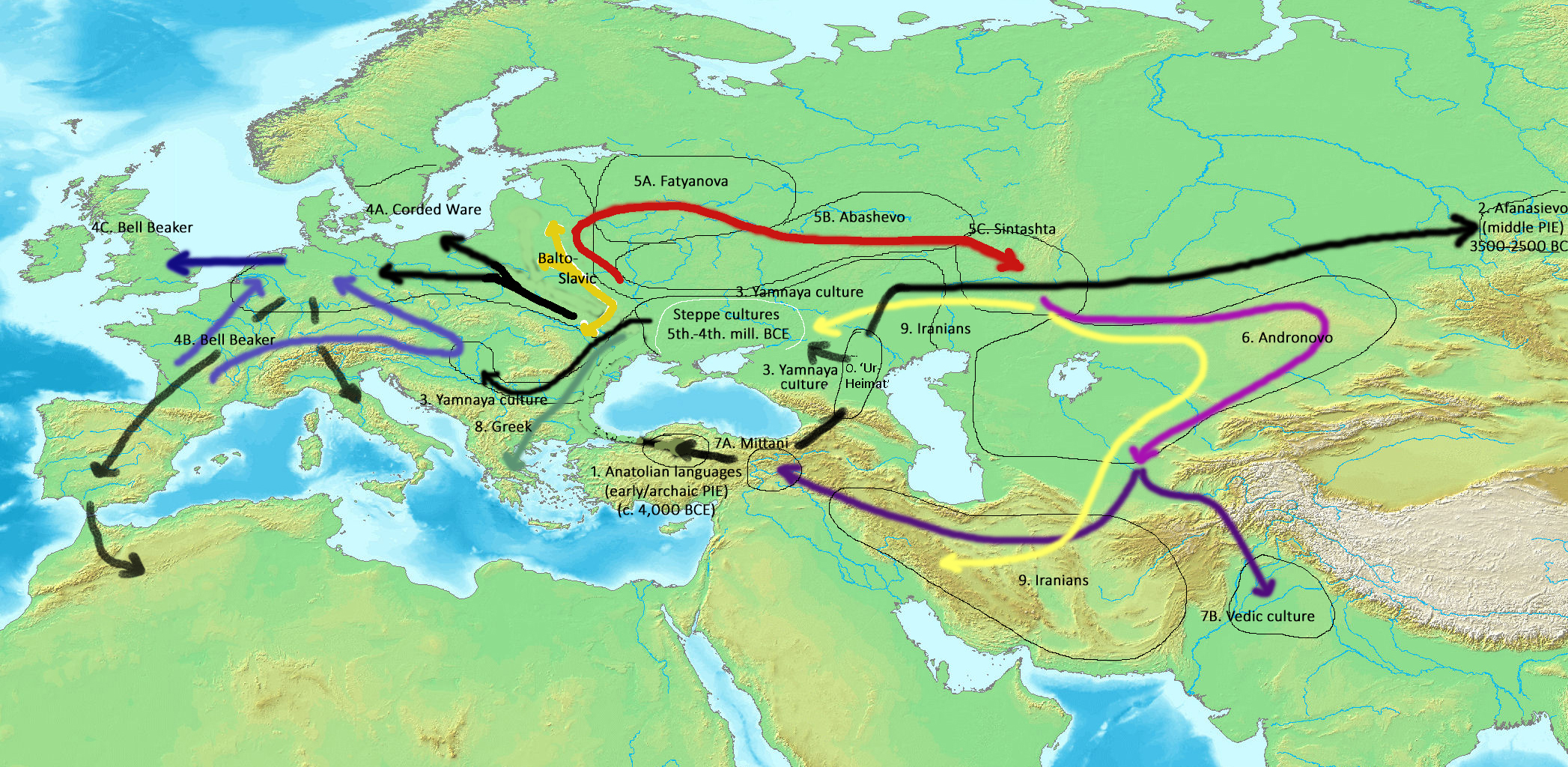
A map of Indo-European language dispersals from c. 4000 to 1000 BCE according to the widely held Kurgan hypothesis.: Center: Steppe cultures; 1 (black): Anatolian languages (archaic PIE); 2 (black): Afanasievo culture (early PIE); 3 (black) Yamnaya culture expansion (Pontic-Caspian steppe, Danube Valley) (late PIE); 4A (black): Western Corded Ware; 4B-C (blue and dark blue): Bell Beaker; adopted by Indo-European speakers; 5A-B (red): Eastern Corded Ware; 5C (red): Sintashta (proto-Indo-Iranian); 6 (magenta): Andronovo; 7A (purple): Indo-Aryans (Mittani); 7B (purple): Indo-Aryans (India); [NN] (dark yellow): proto-Balto-Slavic; 8 (grey): Greek; 9 (yellow): Iranian; [not drawn]: Armenian, expanding from western steppe

One of the earliest attested and thus one of the most important of all Indo-European mythologies is Vedic mythology, especially the mythology of the Rigveda, the oldest of the Vedas. Early scholars of comparative mythology such as Friedrich Max Müller stressed the importance of Vedic mythology to such an extent that they practically equated it with Proto-Indo-European myths. Modern researchers have been much more cautious, recognizing that, although Vedic mythology is still central, other mythologies must also be taken into account.

Another of the most important source mythologies for comparative research is Roman mythology. The Romans possessed a very complex mythological system, parts of which have been preserved through the characteristic Roman tendency to rationalize their myths into historical accounts. Despite its relatively late attestation, Norse mythology is still considered one of the three most important of the Indo-European mythologies for comparative research, due to the vast bulk of surviving Icelandic material.

Baltic mythology has also received a great deal of scholarly attention, as it is linguistically the most conservative and archaic of all surviving branches, but has so far remained frustrating to researchers because the sources are so comparatively late. Latvian folk songs are seen as a major source of information in the process of reconstructing Proto-Indo-European myth. Despite the popularity of Greek mythology in western culture, Greek mythology is generally seen as having little importance in comparative mythology due to the heavy influence of Pre-Greek and Near Eastern cultures, which overwhelms what little Indo-European material can be extracted from it. Consequently, Greek mythology received minimal scholarly attention until the first decade of the 21st century.

Although Scythians are considered relatively conservative in regards to Proto-Indo-European cultures, retaining a similar lifestyle and culture, their mythology has very rarely been examined in an Indo-European context and infrequently discussed in regards to the nature of the ancestral Indo-European mythology. At least three deities, Tabiti, Papaios and Api, are generally interpreted as having Indo-European origins, while the remaining have seen more disparate interpretations. Influence from Siberian, Turkic and even Near Eastern beliefs, on the other hand, are more widely discussed in literature.

== Cosmology ==
There was a fundamental opposition between the never-aging gods dwelling above in the skies and the mortal humans living beneath on the earth. Earth (*dʰéǵʰōm) was perceived as a vast, flat and circular continent surrounded by waters ("the Ocean"). Although they may sometimes be identified with mythical figures or stories, the stars (*h₂stḗr) were not bound to any particular cosmic significance and were perceived as ornamental more than anything else.

According to Martin L. West, the idea of the world-tree (Latin: axis mundi) is probably a later import from North Asiatic cosmologies: "The Greek myth might be derived from the Near East, and the Indic and Germanic ideas of a pillar from the shamanistic cosmologies of the Finno-Ugric and other peoples of central and northern Asia."

=== Cosmogony ===
==== Reconstruction ====
There is no scholarly consensus as to which of the variants is the most accurate reconstruction of the Proto-Indo-European cosmogonic myth. Bruce Lincoln's reconstruction of the Proto-Indo-European motif known as "Twin and Man" is supported by a number of scholars such as Jaan Puhvel, J. P. Mallory, Douglas Q. Adams, David W. Anthony, and, in part, Martin L. West. Although some thematic parallels can be made with traditions of the Ancient Near East, and even Polynesian or South American legends, Lincoln argues that the linguistic correspondences found in descendant cognates of *Manu and *Yemo make it very likely that the myth has a Proto-Indo-European origin.

According to Edgar C. Polomé, "some elements of the [Scandinavian myth of Ymir] are distinctively Indo-European", but the reconstruction proposed by Lincoln "makes too [many] unprovable assumptions to account for the fundamental changes implied by the Scandinavian version". David A. Leeming also notes that the concept of the cosmic egg, symbolizing the primordial state from which the universe arises, is found in many Indo-European creation myths.

==== Creation myth ====
Lincoln reconstructs a creation myth involving twin brothers, *Manu ("Man") and *Yemo ("Twin"), as the progenitors of the world and humankind, and a hero named *Trito ("Third") who ensured the continuity of the original sacrifice. Regarding the primordial state that may have preceded the creation process, West notes that the Vedic, Norse and, at least partially, the Greek traditions give evidence of an era when the cosmological elements were absent, with similar formulae insisting on their non-existence: "neither non-being was nor being was at that time; there was not the air, nor the heaven beyond it" (Rigveda), "there was not sand nor sea nor the cool waves; earth was nowhere nor heaven above; Ginnungagap there was, but grass nowhere" (Völuspá), "there was Chasm and Night and dark Erebos at first, and broad Tartarus, but earth nor air nor heaven there was" (The Birds).

In the creation myth, the first man *Manu and his twin *Yemo are crossing the cosmos, accompanied by the giant primordial cow. To create the world, *Manu sacrifices his brother and, with the help of heavenly deities (the Sky-Father, the Storm-God and the Divine Twins), forges both the natural elements and human beings from his remains. *Manu thus becomes the first priest after initiating sacrifice as the primordial condition for the world order, and his deceased brother *Yemo the first king as social classes emerge from his anatomy. The priesthood emerges from his head, the warrior class from his breast and arms, and the commoners from his sexual organs and legs. Although the European and Indo-Iranian versions differ on this matter, Lincoln argues that the primeval cow was most likely sacrificed in the original myth, giving birth to the other animals and vegetables, since the pastoral way of life of Proto-Indo-Iranian speakers was closer to that of Proto-Indo-European speakers.

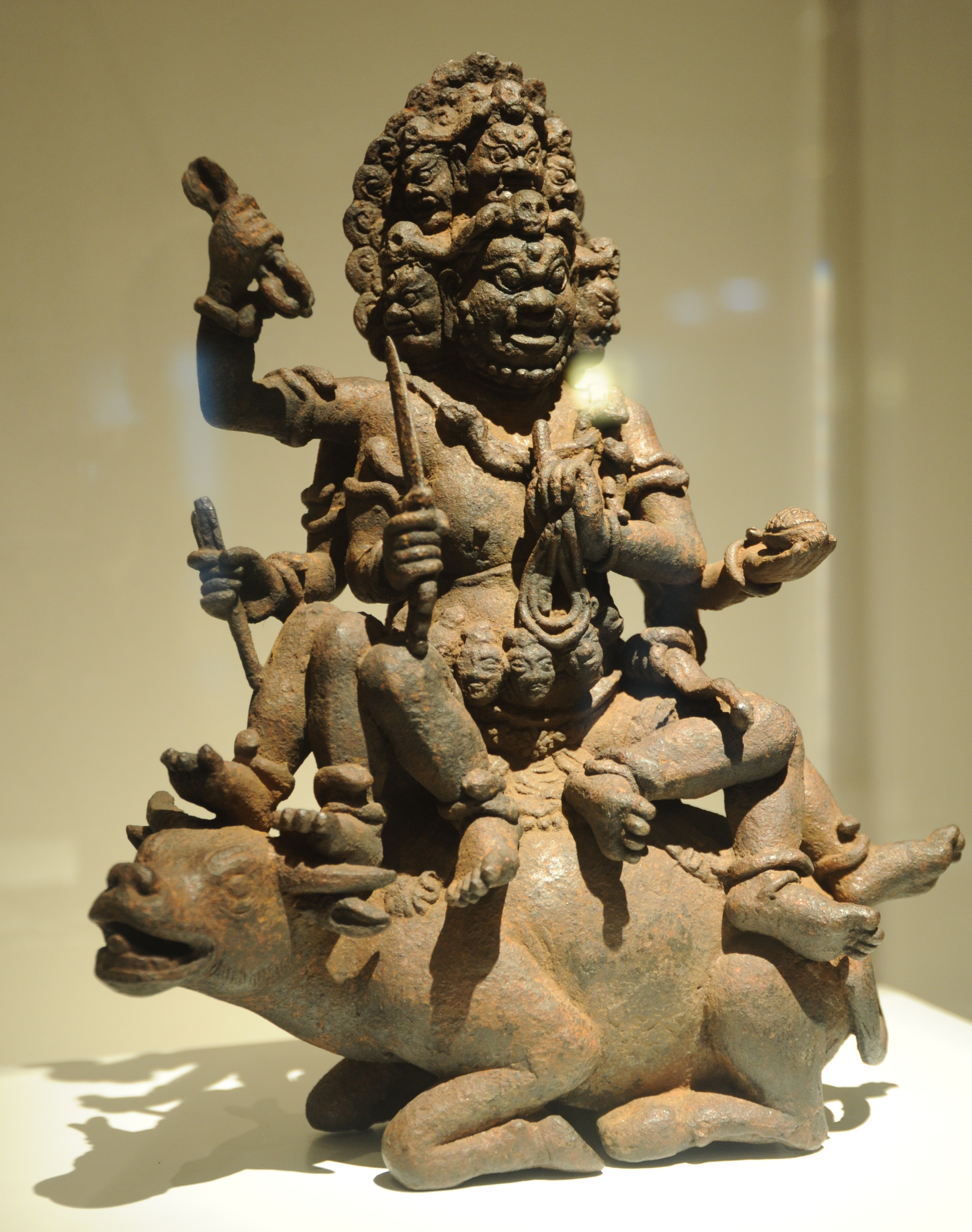
Yama, an Indic reflex of *Yemo, sitting on a water buffalo.

To the third man *Trito, the celestial gods then offer cattle as a divine gift, which is stolen by a three-headed serpent named *Ngʷhi ("serpent"). *Trito first suffers at his hands, but the hero eventually manages to overcome the monster, fortified by an intoxicating drink and aided by the Sky-Father. He eventually gives the recovered cattle back to a priest for it to be properly sacrificed. *Trito is now the first warrior, maintaining through his heroic actions the cycle of mutual giving between gods and mortals.

==== Interpretations ====
According to Lincoln, *Manu and *Yemo seem to be the protagonists of "a myth of the sovereign function, establishing the model for later priests and kings", while the legend of *Trito should be interpreted as "a myth of the warrior function, establishing the model for all later men of arms". The myth indeed recalls the Dumézilian tripartition of the cosmos between the priest (in both his magical and legal aspects), the warrior (the Third Man), and the herder (the cow).

The story of *Trito served as a model for later cattle raiding epic myths and most likely as a moral justification for the practice of raiding among Indo-European peoples. In the original legend, *Trito is only taking back what rightfully belongs to his people, those who sacrifice properly to the gods. The myth has been interpreted either as a cosmic conflict between the heavenly hero and the earthly serpent, or as an Indo-European victory over non-Indo-European people, the monster symbolizing the aboriginal thief or usurper.

Some scholars have proposed that the primeval being *Yemo was depicted as a two-fold hermaphrodite rather than a twin brother of *Manu, both forming indeed a pair of complementary beings entwined together. The Germanic names Ymir and Tuisto were understood as twin, bisexual or hermaphrodite, and some myths give a sister to the Vedic Yama, also called Twin and with whom incest is discussed. In this interpretation, the primordial being may have self-sacrificed, or have been divided in two, a male half and a female half, embodying a prototypal separation of the sexes.

==== Legacy ====
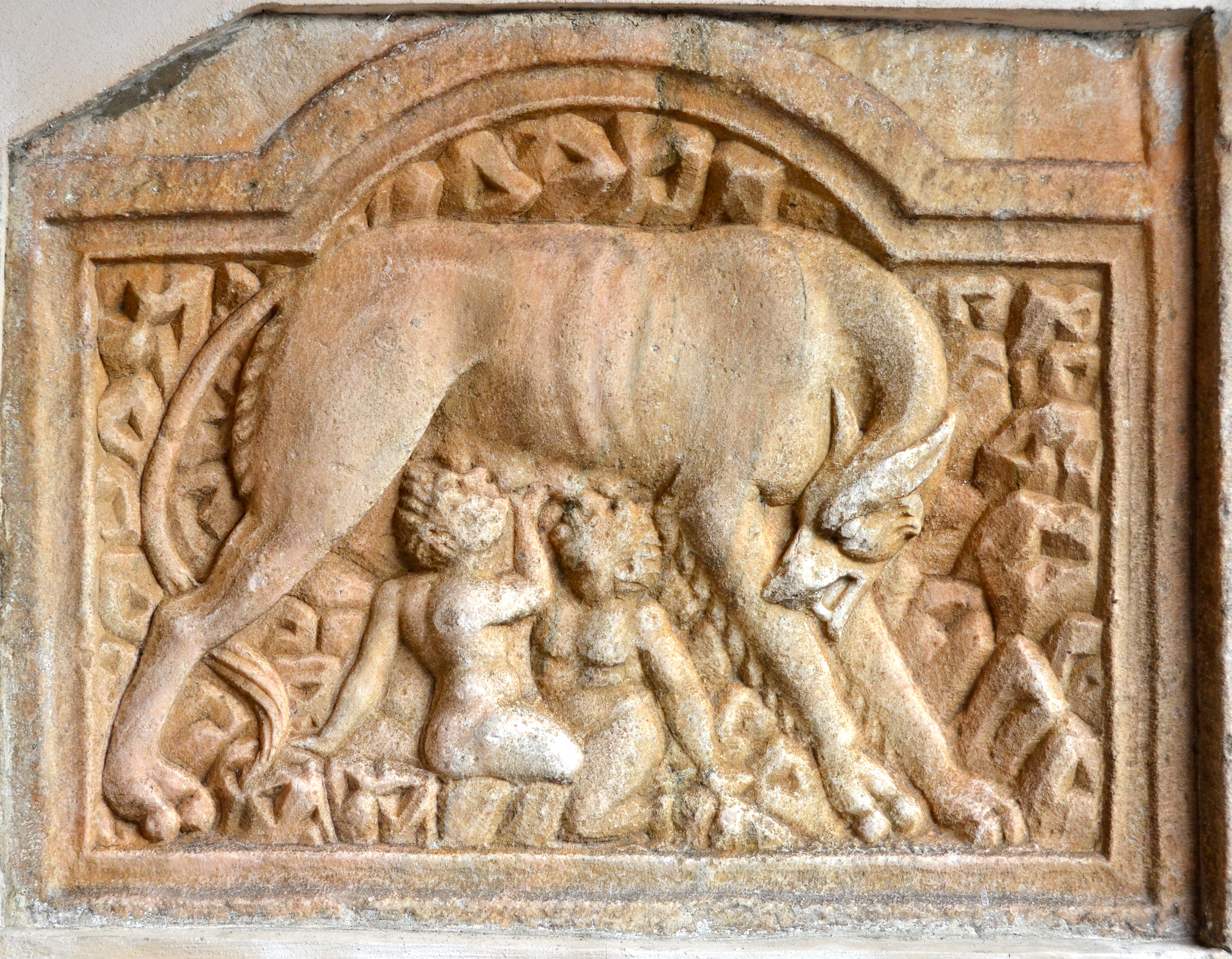
An Ancient Roman relief from the Cathedral of Maria Saal showing the infant twins Romulus and Remus being suckled by a she-wolf.

Cognates deriving from the Proto-Indo-European First Priest *Manu ("Man", "ancestor of mankind") include the Indic Manu, legendary first man in Hinduism, and Manāvī, his sacrificed wife; the Germanic Mannus (Proto-Germanic: *Mannaz), mythical ancestor of the West Germanic tribes; and the Persian Manūščihr (from Avestan Manūš.čiθra), a Zoroastrian high priest of the 9th century AD.

From the name of the sacrificed First King *Yemo ("Twin") derive the Indic Yama, god of death and the underworld; the Avestan Yima, king of the golden age and guardian of hell; the Norse Ymir (from Proto-Germanic *Jumijaz), ancestor of the giants (jötnar); and, most likely, Remus (from Proto-Latin *Yemos or *Yemonos, with the initial y- shifting to r- under the influence of Rōmulus), killed in the Roman foundation myth by his twin brother Romulus. Cognates stemming from the First Warrior *Trito ("Third") include the Vedic Trita, the Avestan Thrita, and the Norse þriði.

Many Indo-European beliefs explain the origin of natural elements as the result of the original dismemberment of *Yemo: his flesh usually becomes the earth, his hair grass, his bone yields stone, his blood water, his eyes the sun, his mind the moon, his brain the clouds, his breath the wind, and his head the heavens. The traditions of sacrificing an animal to disperse its parts according to socially established patterns, a custom found in Ancient Rome and India, has been interpreted as an attempt to restore the balance of the cosmos ruled by the original sacrifice.

The motif of *Manu and *Yemo has been influential throughout Eurasia following the Indo-European migrations. The Greek, Old Russian (Poem on the Dove King) and Jewish versions depend on the Iranian, and a Chinese version of the myth has been introduced from Ancient India. The Armenian version of the myth of the First Warrior *Trito depends on the Iranian, and the Roman reflexes were influenced by earlier Greek versions.

=== Cosmic order ===
Linguistic evidence has led scholars to reconstruct the concept of *h₂értus, denoting 'what is fitting, rightly ordered', and ultimately deriving from the verbal root *h₂er-, 'to fit'. Descendant cognates include Hittite āra ('right, proper'); Sanskrit ṛta ('divine/cosmic law, force of truth, or order'); Avestan arəta- ('order'); Greek artús ('arrangement'), possibly arete ('excellence') via the root *h₂erh₁ ('please, satisfy'); Latin artus ('joint'); Tocharian A ārtt- ('to praise, be pleased with'); Armenian ard ('ornament, shape'); Middle High German art ('innate feature, nature, fashion').

Interwoven with the root *h₂er- ('to fit') is the verbal root *dʰeh₁-, which means 'to put, lay down, establish', but also 'speak, say; bring back'. The Greek thémis and the Sanskrit dhāman both derive from the PIE noun for the 'Law', *dʰeh₁-men-, literally 'that which is established'. This notion of 'Law' includes an active principle, denoting an activity in obedience to the cosmic order *h₂értus, which in a social context is interpreted as a lawful conduct: in the Greek daughter culture, the titaness Themis personifies the cosmic order and the rules of lawful conduct which derived from it. The Vedic code of lawful conduct, the Dharma, can also be traced back to the PIE root *dʰeh₁-.

According to Martin L. West, the root *dʰeh₁- also denotes a divine or cosmic creation, as attested by the Hittite expression nēbis dēgan dāir ("established heaven (and) earth"), the Young Avestan formula kə huvāpå raocåscā dāt təmåscā? ("What skilful artificer made the regions of light and dark?"), the name of the Vedic creator god Dhātr, and possibly by the Greek nymph Thetis, presented as a demiurgical goddess in Alcman's poetry.

Another root *yew(e)s- appears to be connected with ritualistic laws, as suggested by the Latin iūs ('law, right, justice, duty'), Avestan yaož-dā- ('make ritually pure'), and Sanskrit śáṃca yóśca ('health and happiness'), with a derived adjective *yusi(iy)os seen in Old Irish uisse ('just right, fitting') and possibly Old Church Slavonic istǔ ('actual, true').

=== Otherworld ===
The realm of death was generally depicted as the Lower Darkness and the land of no return. Many Indo-European myths relate a journey across a river, guided by an old man (*ǵerh₂ont-), in order to reach the Otherworld. The Greek tradition of the dead being ferried across the river Styx by Charon is probably a reflex of this belief, and the idea of crossing a river to reach the Underworld is also present throughout Celtic mythologies. Several Vedic texts contain references to crossing a river (the Vaitarna) in order to reach the land of the dead, and the Latin word tarentum ("tomb") originally meant "crossing point".

In Norse mythology, Hermóðr must cross a bridge over the river Giöll in order to reach Hel and, in Latvian folk songs, the dead must cross a marsh rather than a river. Traditions of placing coins on the bodies of the deceased in order to pay the ferryman are attested in both ancient Greek and early modern Slavic funerary practices. The earliest coins date to the Iron Age. This may provide evidence of an ancient tradition of giving offerings to the ferryman.

In a recurrent motif, the Otherworld contains a gate, generally guarded by a multi-headed (sometimes multi-eyed) dog who could also serve as a guide and ensured that the ones who entered could not get out. The Greek Cerberus and the Hindu Śárvara most likely derive from the common noun *kérberos ("spotted"). Bruce Lincoln has proposed a third cognate in the Norse Garmr, although this has been debated as linguistically untenable. (Note: The name Garm also appears in the compound Managarmr ('Moon-Hound', 'Moon's dog'), another name for Hati Hróðvitnisson, the lupine pursuer of the moon in Scandinavian mythology.)

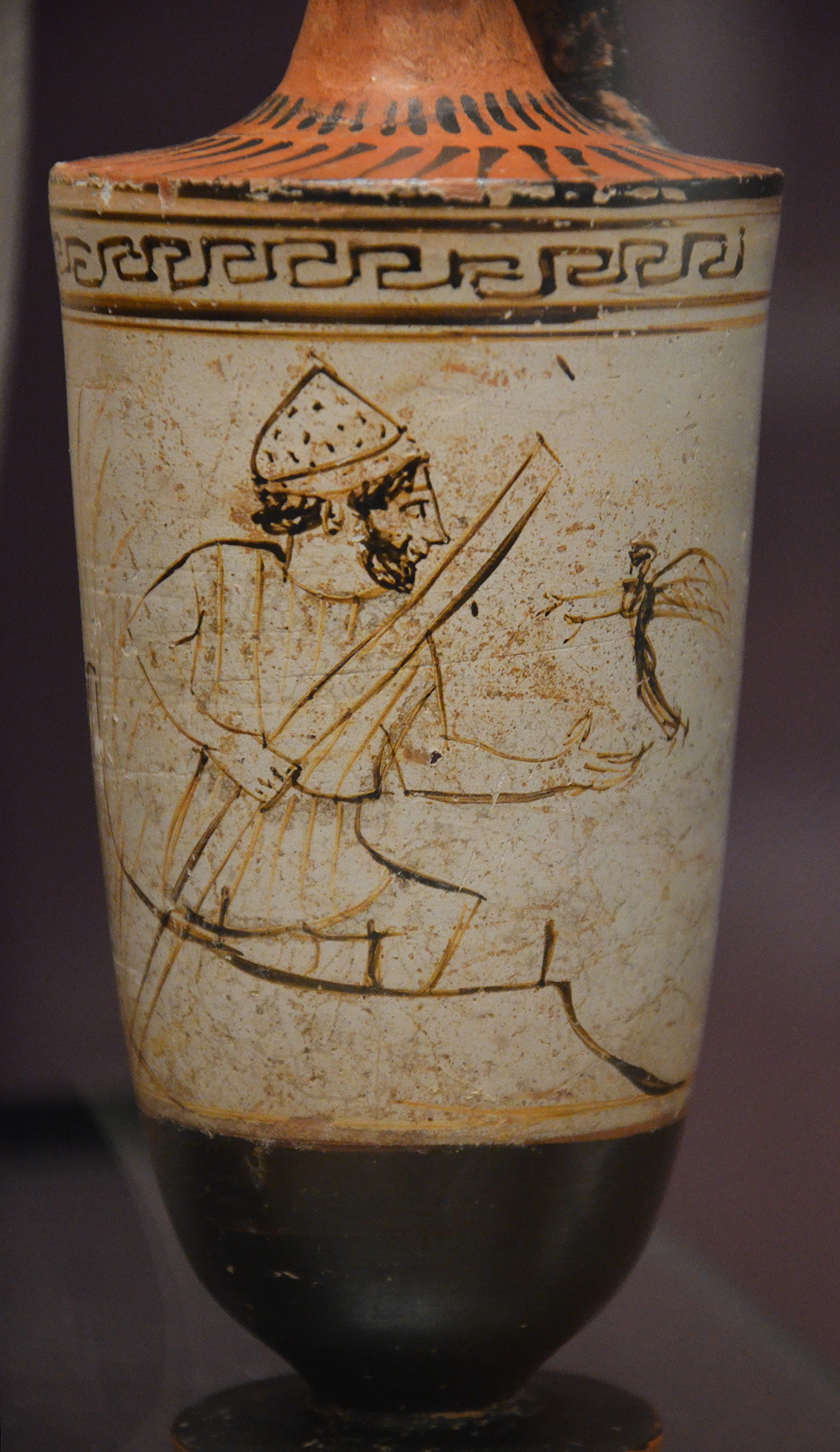
An Attic red-figure lekythos attributed to the Tymbos painter showing Charon welcoming a soul into his boat, c. 500–450 BC.

=== Eschatology ===
Several traditions reveal traces of a Proto-Indo-European eschatological myth that describes the end of the world following a cataclysmic battle. The story begins when an archdemon, usually coming from a different and inimical paternal line, assumes the position of authority among the community of the gods or heroes (Norse Loki, Roman Tarquin, Irish Bres). The subjects are treated unjustly by the new ruler, forced to erect fortifications while the archdemon instead favors outsiders, on whom his support relies. After a particularly heinous act, the archdemon is exiled by his subjects and takes refuge among his foreign relatives.

A new leader (Norse Víðarr, Roman Lucius Brutus, Old Irish Lug), known as the "silent one" and usually the nephew or grandson (*népōt) of the exiled archdemon, then springs up, and the two forces come together to annihilate each other in a cataclysmic battle. The myth ends with the interruption of the cosmic order and the conclusion of a temporal cyclic era. In the Norse and Iranian traditions, a cataclysmic "cosmic winter" precedes the final battle.

=== Other propositions ===
In the cosmological model proposed by Jean Haudry, the Proto-Indo-European sky is composed of three "heavens" (diurnal, nocturnal and liminal) rotating around an axis mundi, each having its own deities, social associations and colors (white, dark and red, respectively). Deities of the diurnal sky could not transgress the domain of the nocturnal sky, inhabited by its own sets of gods and by the spirits of the dead. For instance, Zeus cannot extend his power to the nightly sky in the Iliad. In this vision, the liminal or transitional sky embodies the gate or frontier (dawn and twilight) binding the two other heavens.

Proto-Indo-Europeans may have believed that the peripheral part of the Earth (the ends of the Earth) was inhabited by a people exempt from the hardships and pains that arise from the human condition. The common motif is suggested by the legends of the Indic Śvetadvīpam ("White Island"), whose inhabitants shine white like the Moon and need no food; the Greek Hyperborea ("Beyond the North Wind"), where the Sun shines all the time and the men know "neither disease nor bitter old age"; the Irish Tír na nÓg ("Land of the Young"), a mythical region located in the western sea where "happiness lasts forever and there is no satiety"; or the Germanic Ódáinsakr ("Glittering Plains"), a land situated beyond the Ocean where "no one is permitted to die".

== Deities ==
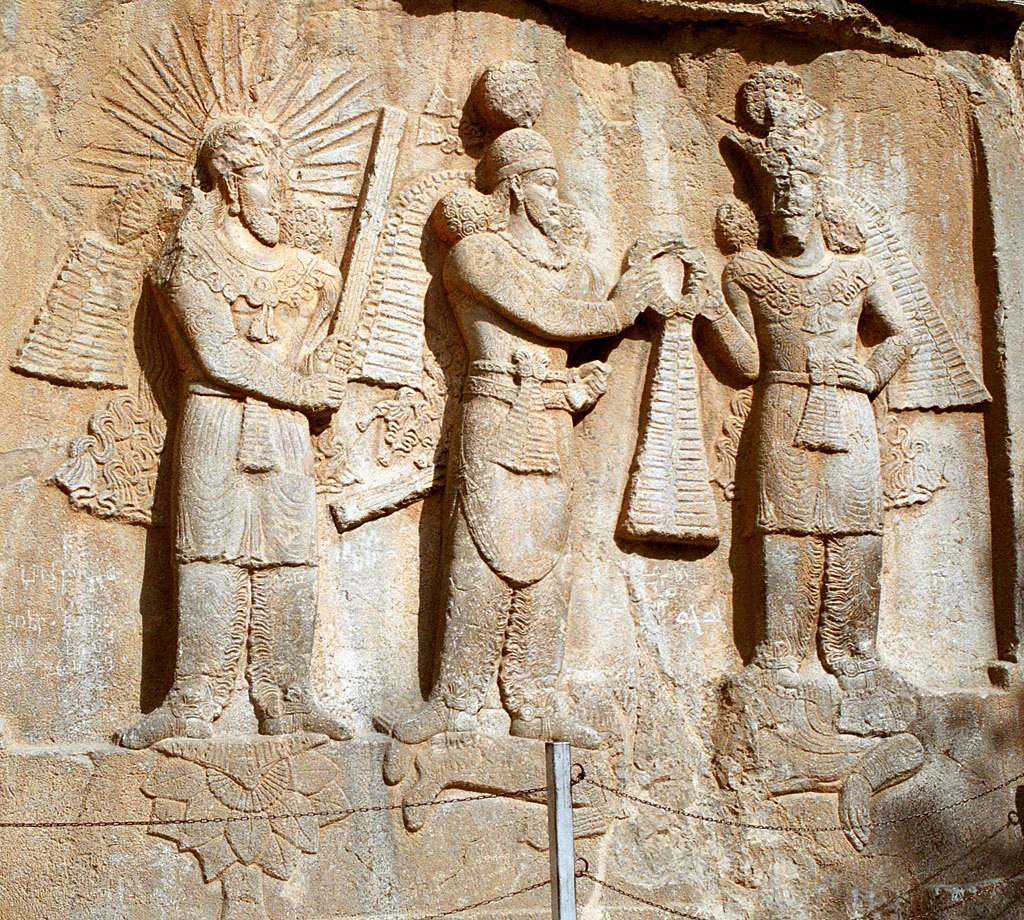
Zoroastrian deities Mithra (left) and Ahura Mazda (right) with king Ardashir II.

The archaic Proto-Indo-European language (4500–4000) (Note: "Classic" is defined by David W. Anthony as the proto-language spoken after the Anatolian split, and "Archaic" as the common ancestor of all Indo-European languages.) had a two-gender system which originally distinguished words between animate and inanimate, a system used to separate a common term from its deified synonym. For instance, fire as an active principle was *h₁n̥gʷnis (Latin ignis; Sanskrit Agní), while the inanimate, physical entity was *péh₂ur (Greek pyr; English fire). During this period, Proto-Indo-European beliefs were still animistic and their language did not yet make formal distinctions between masculine and feminine, although it is likely that each deity was already conceived as either male or female.

Most of the goddesses attested in later Indo-European mythologies come from pre-Indo-European deities eventually assimilated into the various pantheons following the migrations, like the Greek Athena, the Roman Juno, the Irish Medb, or the Iranian Anahita. Diversely personified, they were frequently seen as fulfilling multiple functions, while Proto-Indo-European goddesses shared a lack of personification and narrow functionalities as a general characteristic. The most well-attested female Indo-European deities include *H₂éwsōs, the Dawn, *Dʰéǵʰōm, the Earth, and *Seh₂ul, the Sun.

It is not probable that the Proto-Indo-Europeans had a fixed canon of deities or assigned a specific number to them. The term for "a god" was *deywós ("celestial"), derived from the root *dyew, which denoted the bright sky or the light of day. It has numerous reflexes in Latin deus, Old Norse Týr (< PGmc. *tīwaz), Sanskrit devá, Avestan daeva, Old Irish día, or Lithuanian Dievas. In contrast, human beings were synonymous of "mortals" and associated with the "earthly" (*dʰéǵʰōm), likewise the source of words for "man, human being" in various languages.

Proto-Indo-Europeans believed the gods to be exempt from death and disease because they were nourished by special aliments, usually not available to mortals: in the Chāndogya Upaniṣad, "the gods, of course, neither eat nor drink. They become sated by just looking at this nectar", while the Edda states that "on wine alone the weapon-lord Odin ever lives ... he needs no food; wine is to him both drink and meat". Sometimes concepts could also be deified, such as the Avestan mazdā ("wisdom"), worshipped as Ahura Mazdā ("Lord Wisdom"); the Greek god of war Ares (connected with ἀρή, "ruin, destruction"); or the Vedic protector of treaties Mitráh (from mitrám, "contract").

Gods had several titles, typically "the celebrated", "the highest", "king", or "shepherd", with the notion that deities had their own idiom and true names which might be kept secret from mortals in some circumstances. In Indo-European traditions, gods were seen as the "dispensers" or the "givers of good things" (*déh₃tōr h₁uesuom). Although certain individual deities were charged with the supervision of justice or contracts, in general the Indo-European gods did not have an ethical character. Their immense power, which they could exercise at their pleasure, necessitated rituals, sacrifices and praise songs from worshipers to ensure they would in return bestow prosperity to the community.

The idea that gods were in control of the nature was translated in the suffix *-nos (feminine *-nā), which signified "lord of". According to West, it is attested in Greek Ouranos ("lord of rain") and Helena ("mistress of sunlight"), Germanic *Wōðanaz ("lord of frenzy"), Gaulish Epona ("goddess of horses"), Lithuanian Perkūnas ("lord of oaks"), and in Roman Neptunus ("lord of waters"), Volcanus ("lord of fire-glare") and Silvanus ("lord of woods").

== Pantheon ==
Linguists have been able to reconstruct the names of some deities in the Proto-Indo-European language (PIE) from many types of sources. Some of the proposed deity names are more readily accepted among scholars than others. According to philologist Martin L. West, "the clearest cases are the cosmic and elemental deities: the Sky-god, his partner Earth, and his twin sons; the Sun, the Sun Maiden, and the Dawn; gods of storm, wind, water, fire; and terrestrial presences such as the Rivers, spring and forest nymphs, and a god of the wild who guards roads and herds".

=== Genealogy ===
The most securely reconstructed genealogy of the Proto-Indo-European gods (Götterfamilie) is given as follows:

	Dyēws; Daylight-Sky		Dhéǵhōm; Earth
The Divine Twins		The Sun Maiden		Hausōs; Dawn

An alternative genealogy has been proposed by P. Jackson (2002):

	Dyēws; Daylight-Sky		Diuōneh₂
The Divine Twins	The Sun Maiden	Perkwunos; The Oak-God	Dhéǵhōm; Earth	Hausōs; Dawn

=== Heavenly deities ===
==== Sky Father ====
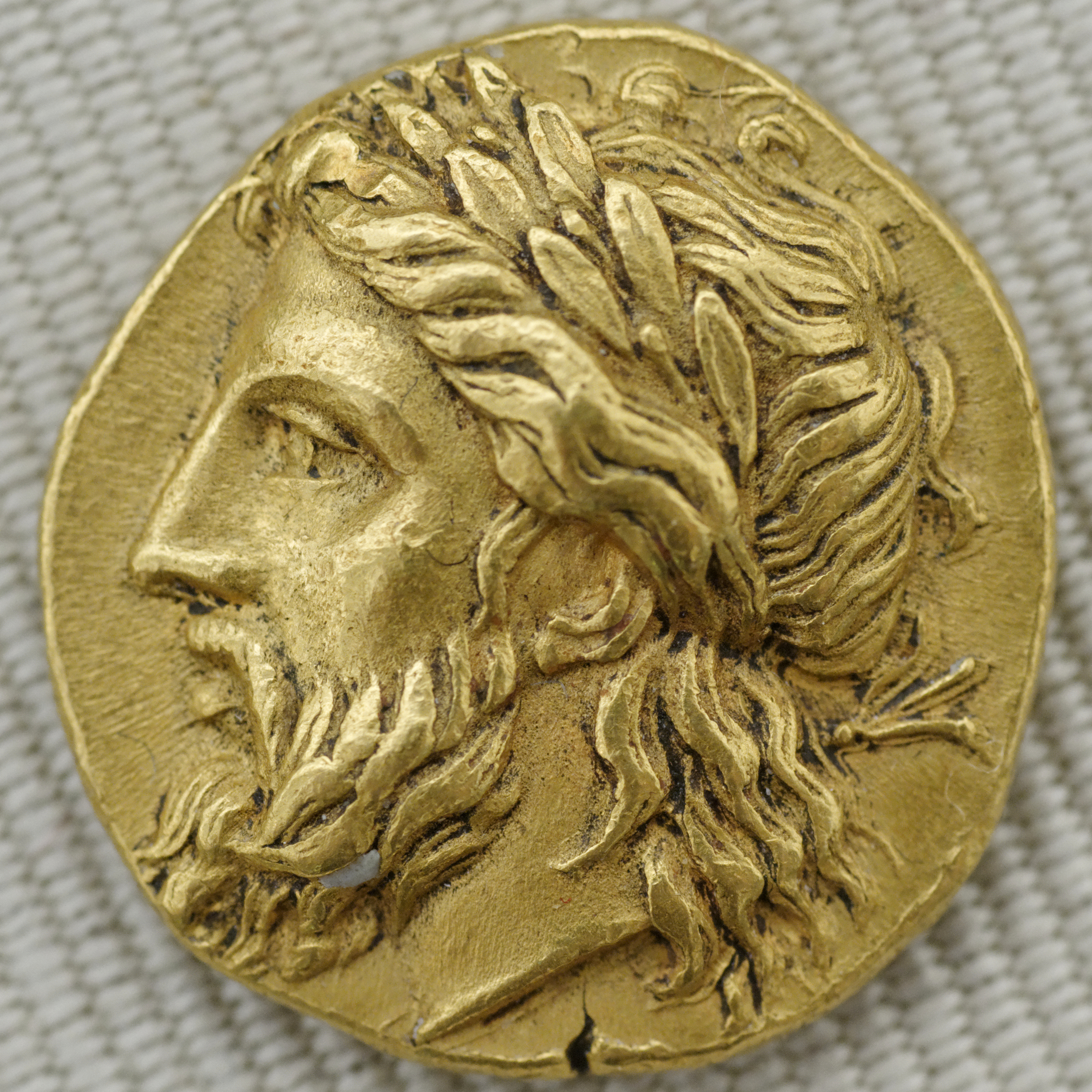
A laurel-wreathed head of Zeus on a gold stater from the Greek city of Lampsacus, c 360–340 BC.

The head deity of the Proto-Indo-European pantheon was the god *Dyḗws Ph₂tḗr, whose name literally means "Sky Father". Regarded as the Sky or Day conceived as a divine entity, and thus the dwelling of the gods, the Heaven,' Dyēws is, by far, the most well-attested of all the Proto-Indo-European deities. As the gateway to the gods and the father of both the Divine Twins and the goddess of the dawn (Hausos), Dyēws was a prominent deity in the pantheon. He was however likely not their ruler, or the holder of the supreme power like Zeus and Jupiter.

Due to his celestial nature, Dyēus is often described as "all-seeing", or "with wide vision" in Indo-European myths. It is unlikely however that he was in charge of the supervision of justice and righteousness, as it was the case for the Zeus or the Indo-Iranian Mithra–Varuna duo; but he was suited to serve at least as a witness to oaths and treaties.

The Greek god Zeus and the Roman god Jupiter both appear as the head gods of their respective pantheons. *Dyḗws Ph₂tḗr is also attested in the Rigveda as Dyáus Pitā, a minor ancestor figure mentioned in only a few hymns, and in the Illyrian god Dei-Pátrous, attested once by Hesychius of Alexandria. The ritual expressions Debess tēvs in Latvian and attas Isanus in Hittite are not exact descendants of the formula *Dyḗws Ph₂tḗr, but they do preserve its original structure.

==== Dawn Goddess ====
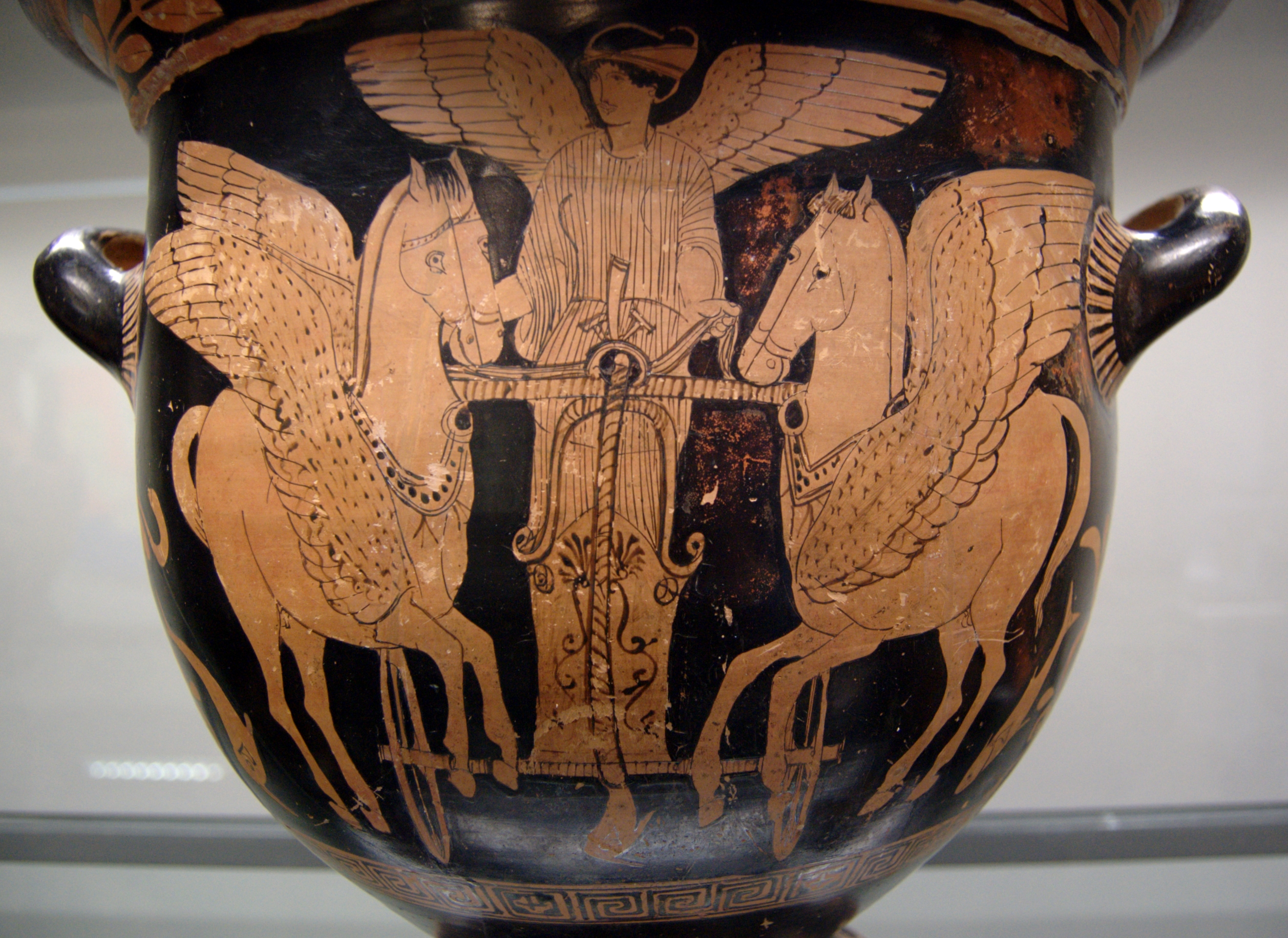
Eos in her chariot flying over the sea, red-figure krater from South Italy, 430–420 BC, Staatliche Antikensammlungen, Munich.

*H₂éusōs has been reconstructed as the Proto-Indo-European goddess of the dawn. In three traditions (Indic, Greek, Baltic), the Dawn is the "daughter of heaven", *Dyḗws. In these three branches plus a fourth (Italic), the reluctant dawn-goddess is chased or beaten from the scene for tarrying. An ancient epithet designating the Dawn appears to have been *Dʰuǵh₂tḗr Diwós, "Sky Daughter". Depicted as opening the gates of Heaven when she appears at the beginning of the day, Hausōs is generally seen as never-ageing or born again each morning. Associated with red or golden cloths, she is often portrayed as dancing.

Twenty-one hymns in the Rigveda are dedicated to the dawn goddess Uṣás and a single passage from the Avesta honors the dawn goddess Ušå. The dawn goddess Eos appears prominently in early Greek poetry and mythology. The Roman dawn goddess Aurora is a reflection of the Greek Eos, but the original Roman dawn goddess may have continued to be worshipped under the cultic title Mater Matuta.

The Anglo-Saxons worshipped the goddess Ēostre, who was associated with a festival in spring which later gave its name to a month, which gave its name to the Christian holiday of Easter in English. The name Ôstarmânôth in Old High German has been taken as an indication that a similar goddess was also worshipped in southern Germany. The Lithuanian dawn goddess Aušra was still acknowledged in the sixteenth century.

==== Sun and Moon ====
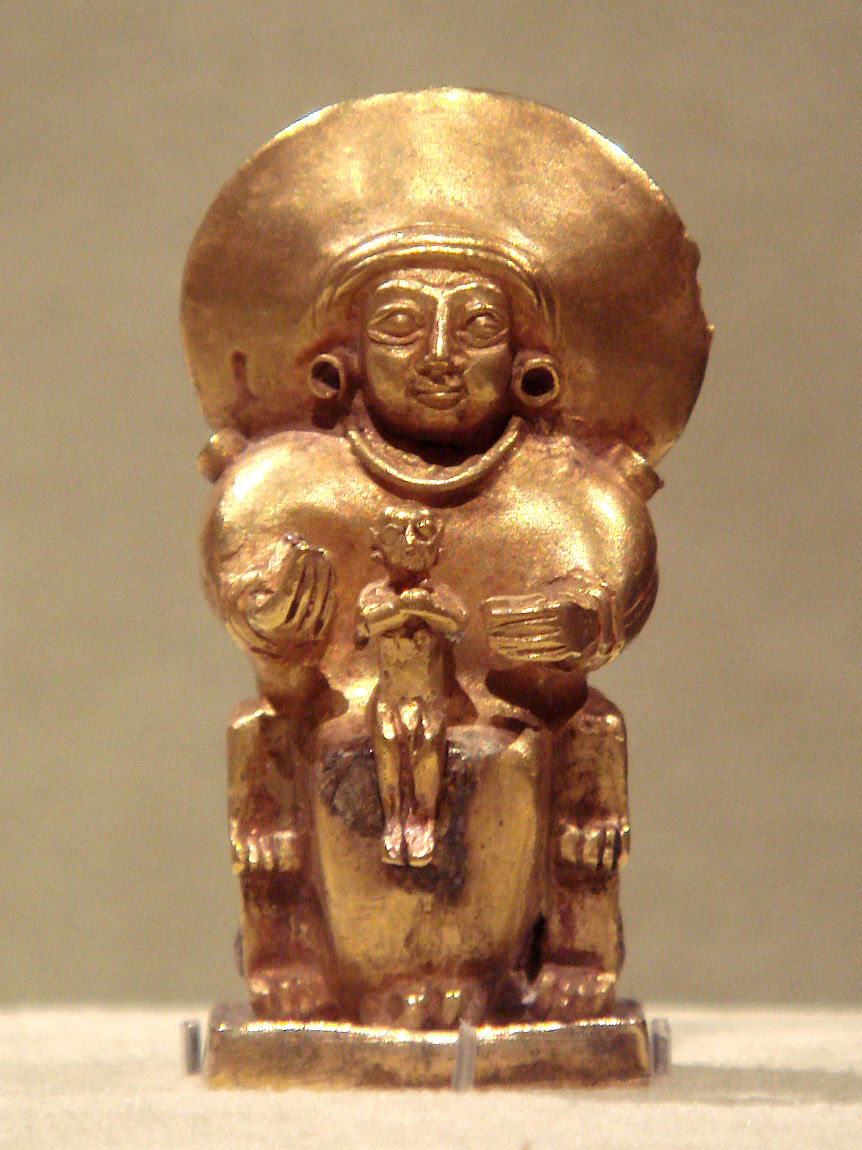
A possible depiction of the Hittite Sun goddess holding a child in her arms from between 1400 and 1200 BC.

*Seh₂ul and *Meh₁not are reconstructed as the Proto-Indo-European deity of the Sun and deity of the Moon respectively. Their gender varies according to the different mythologies of the Indo-European peoples.

The daily course of *Seh₂ul across the sky on a horse-driven chariot is a common motif among Indo-European myths. (Note: On a related note, the Pahlavi Bundahishn narrates that creator Ohrmazd fashioned the sun "whose horses were swift".) While it is probably inherited, the motif certainly appeared after the introduction of the wheel in the Pontic–Caspian steppe about 3500 BC, and is therefore a late addition to Proto-Indo-European culture.

Although the sun was personified as an independent deity, the Proto-Indo-Europeans also visualized the sun as the "lamp of Dyēws" or the "eye of Dyēws";

==== Divine Twins ====
The Horse Twins are a set of twin brothers found throughout nearly every Indo-European pantheon who usually have a name that means 'horse', *h₁éḱwos, although the names are not always cognate, and no Proto-Indo-European name for them can be reconstructed.

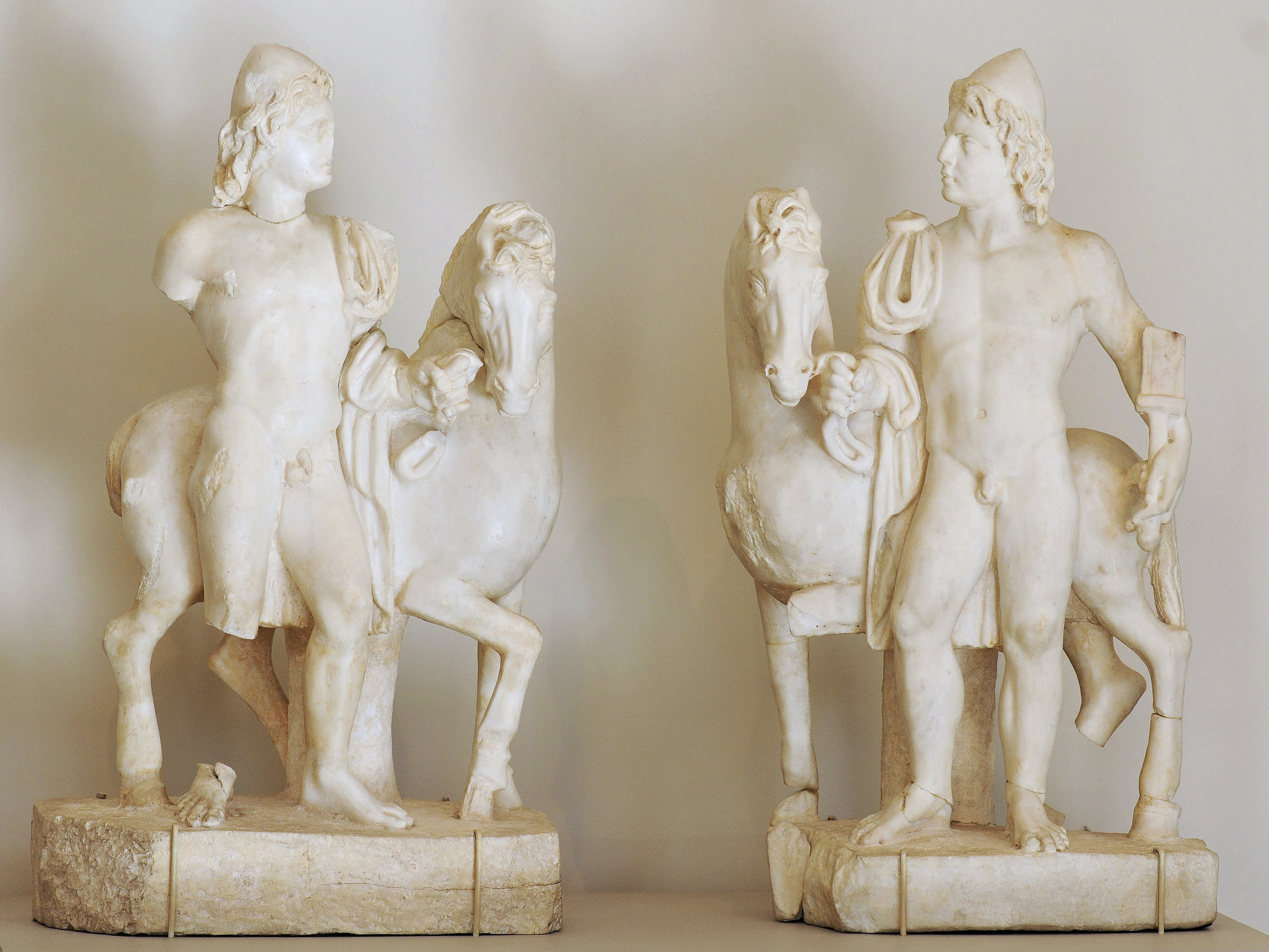
A pair of Roman statuettes from the third century AD depicting the Dioscuri as horsemen, with their characteristic skullcaps (Metropolitan Museum of Art, New York).

In most traditions, the Horse Twins are brothers of the Sun Maiden or Dawn goddess, and the sons of the sky god, *Dyḗws Ph₂tḗr. The Greek Dioscuri (Castor and Pollux) are the "sons of Zeus"; the Vedic Divó nápātā (Aśvins) are the "sons of Dyaús", the sky-god; the Lithuanian Dievo sūneliai (Ašvieniai) are the "sons of the God" (Dievas); and the Latvian Dieva dēli are likewise the "sons of the God" (Dievs).

Represented as young men and the steeds who pull the sun across the sky, the Divine Twins rode horses (sometimes they were depicted as horses themselves) and rescued men from mortal peril in battle or at sea. The Divine Twins are often differentiated: one is represented as a young warrior while the other is seen as a healer or concerned with domestic duties. In most tales where they appear, the Divine Twins rescue the Dawn from a watery peril, a theme that emerged from their role as the solar steeds. At night, the horses of the sun returned to the east in a golden boat, where they traversed the sea (Note: Probably the northern Black Sea or the Sea of Azov.) to bring back the Sun each morning. During the day, they crossed the sky in pursuit of their consort, the morning star.

Other reflexes may be found in the Anglo-Saxon Hengist and Horsa (whose names mean "stallion" and "horse"), the Celtic "Dioskouroi" said by Timaeus to be venerated by Atlantic Celts as a set of horse twins, the Germanic Alcis, a pair of young male brothers worshipped by the Naharvali, or the Welsh Brân and Manawydan. The horse twins could have been based on the morning and evening star (the planet Venus) and they often have stories about them in which they "accompany" the Sun goddess, because of the close orbit of the planet Venus to the sun.

==== Mitra-Varuna ====
Although the etymological association is often deemed untenable, some scholars (such as Georges Dumézil and S. K. Sen) have proposed *Worunos or *Werunos (also the eponymous god in the reconstructed dialogue The king and the god) as the nocturnal sky and benevolent counterpart of Dyēws, with possible cognates in Greek Ouranos and Vedic Varuna, from the PIE root *woru- ("to encompass, cover"). Worunos may have personified the firmament, or dwelled in the night sky. In both Greek and Vedic poetry, Ouranos and Varuna are portrayed as "wide-looking", bounding or seizing their victims, and having or being a heavenly "seat".

In the three-sky cosmological model, the celestial phenomena linking the nightly and daily skies is embodied by a "Binder-god": the Greek Kronos, a transitional deity between Ouranos and Zeus in Hesiod's Theogony, the Indic Savitṛ, associated with the rising and setting of the sun in the Vedas, and the Roman Saturnus, whose feast marked the period immediately preceding the winter solstice.

==== Other propositions ====
Some scholars have proposed a consort goddess named *Diwōnā or *Diuōneh₂, a spouse of Dyēws with a possible descendant in the Greek goddess Dione. A thematic echo may also occur in Vedic India, as both Indra's wife Indrānī and Zeus's consort Dione display a jealous and quarrelsome disposition under provocation. A second descendant may be found in Dia, a mortal said to unite with Zeus in a Greek myth. The story leads ultimately to the birth of the Centaurs after the mating of Dia's husband Ixion with the phantom of Hera, the spouse of Zeus. The reconstruction is only attested in those two traditions and therefore not secured.

The Greek Hera, the Roman Juno, the Germanic Frigg and the Indic Shakti are often depicted as the protectress of marriage and fertility, or as the bestower of the gift of prophecy. James P. Mallory and Douglas Q. Adams note that "these functions are much too generic to support the supposition of a distinct PIE 'consort goddess' and many of the 'consorts' probably represent assimilations of earlier goddesses who may have had nothing to do with marriage."

=== Nature deities ===
The substratum of Proto-Indo-European mythology is animistic. This native animism is still reflected in the Indo-European daughter cultures. In Norse mythology the Vættir are for instance reflexes of the native animistic nature spirits and deities. Trees have a central position in Indo-European daughter cultures, and are thought to be the abode of tree spirits.

In Indo-European tradition, the storm is deified as a highly active, assertive, and sometimes aggressive element; the fire and water are deified as cosmic elements that are also necessary for the functioning of the household; the deified earth is associated with fertility and growth on the one hand, and with death and the underworld on the other.

==== Earth Mother ====
The earth goddess, *Dʰéǵʰōm, is portrayed as the vast and dark house of mortals, in contrast with Dyēws, the bright sky and seat of the immortal gods. She is associated with fertility and growth, but also with death as the final dwelling of the deceased. She was likely the consort of the sky father, *Dyḗws Ph₂tḗr. The duality is associated with fertility, as the crop grows from her moist soil, nourished by the rain of Dyēws. The Earth is thus portrayed as the giver of good things: she is exhorted to become pregnant in an Old English prayer. Slavic peasants described Zemlja-matushka, Mother Earth, as a prophetess that shall offer favorable harvest to the community.

The unions of Zeus with Semele and Demeter is likewise associated with fertility and growth in Greek mythology. This pairing is further attested in the Vedic pairing of Dyáus Pitā and Prithvi Mater, the Greek pairing of Ouranos and Gaia, the Roman pairing of Jupiter and Tellus Mater from Macrobius's Saturnalia, and the Norse pairing of Odin and Jörð. Although Odin is not a reflex of *Dyḗws Ph₂tḗr, his cult may have subsumed aspects of an earlier chief deity who was. The Earth and Heaven couple is not at the origin of the other gods, as the Divine Twins and Hausos were probably conceived by Dyēws alone.

Cognates include the Albanian Dheu and Zonja e Dheut, Great Mother Earth and Earth Goddess, respectively; Žemyna, a Lithuanian goddess of earth celebrated as the bringer of flowers; the Avestan Zām, the Zoroastrian concept of 'earth'; Zemes Māte ("Mother Earth"), one of the goddesses of death in Latvian mythology; the Hittite Dagan-zipas ("Genius of the Earth"); the Slavic Mati Syra Zemlya ("Mother Moist Earth"); the Greek Chthôn (Χθών), the partner of Ouranos in Aeschylus' Danaids, and the chthonic deities of the underworld. The possibilities of a Thracian goddess Zemelā (*gʰem-elā) and a Messapic goddess Damatura (*dʰǵʰem-māter), at the origin of the Greek Semele and Demeter respectively, are less secured.

The commonest epithets attached to the Earth goddess are *Pleth₂-wih₁ (the "Broad One"), attested in the Vedic Pṛthvī, the Greek Plataia and Gaulish Litavis, and *Pleth₂-wih₁ Méh₂tēr ("Mother Broad One"), attested in the Vedic and Old English formulas Pṛthvī Mātā and Fīra Mōdor. Other frequent epithets include the "All-Bearing One", the one who bears all things or creatures, and the "mush-nourishing" or the "rich-pastured".

==== Weather deity ====
*Perkʷunos has been reconstructed as the Proto-Indo-European god of lightning and storms. It either meant "the Striker" or "the Lord of Oaks", and he was probably represented as holding a hammer or a similar weapon. Thunder and lightning had both a destructive and regenerative connotation: a lightning bolt can cleave a stone or a tree, but is often accompanied with fructifying rain. This likely explains the strong association between the thunder-god and oaks in some traditions (oak being among the densest of trees is most prone to lightning strikes). He is often portrayed in connection with stone and (wooded) mountains, probably because the mountainous forests were his realm. The striking of devils, demons or evildoers by Perkʷunos is a motif encountered in the myths surrounding the Lithuanian Perkūnas and the Vedic Parjanya, a possible cognate, but also in the Germanic Thor, a thematic echo of Perkʷunos.

The deities generally agreed to be cognates stemming from *Perkʷunos are confined to the European continent, and he could have been a motif developed later in Western Indo-European traditions. The evidence include the Norse goddess Fjǫrgyn (the mother of Thor), the Lithuanian god Perkūnas, the Slavic god Perúnú, and the Celtic Hercynian (Herkynío) mountains or forests. Perëndi, an Albanian thunder-god (from the stem per-en-, "to strike", attached to -di, "sky", from *dyews-) is also a probable cognate. The evidence could extend to the Vedic tradition if one adds the god of rain, thunder and lightning Parjánya, although Sanskrit sound laws rather predict a *parkūn(y)a form.

From another root *(s)tenh₂ ("thunder") stems a group of cognates found in the Germanic, Celtic and Roman thunder-gods Thor, Taranis, (Jupiter) Tonans and (Zeus) Keraunos. According to Jackson, "they may have arisen as the result of fossilisation of an original epithet or epiclesis", as the Vedic Parjanya is also called stanayitnú- ("Thunderer"). The Roman god Mars may be a thematic echo of Perkʷunos, since he originally had thunderer characteristics.

==== Fire deities ====
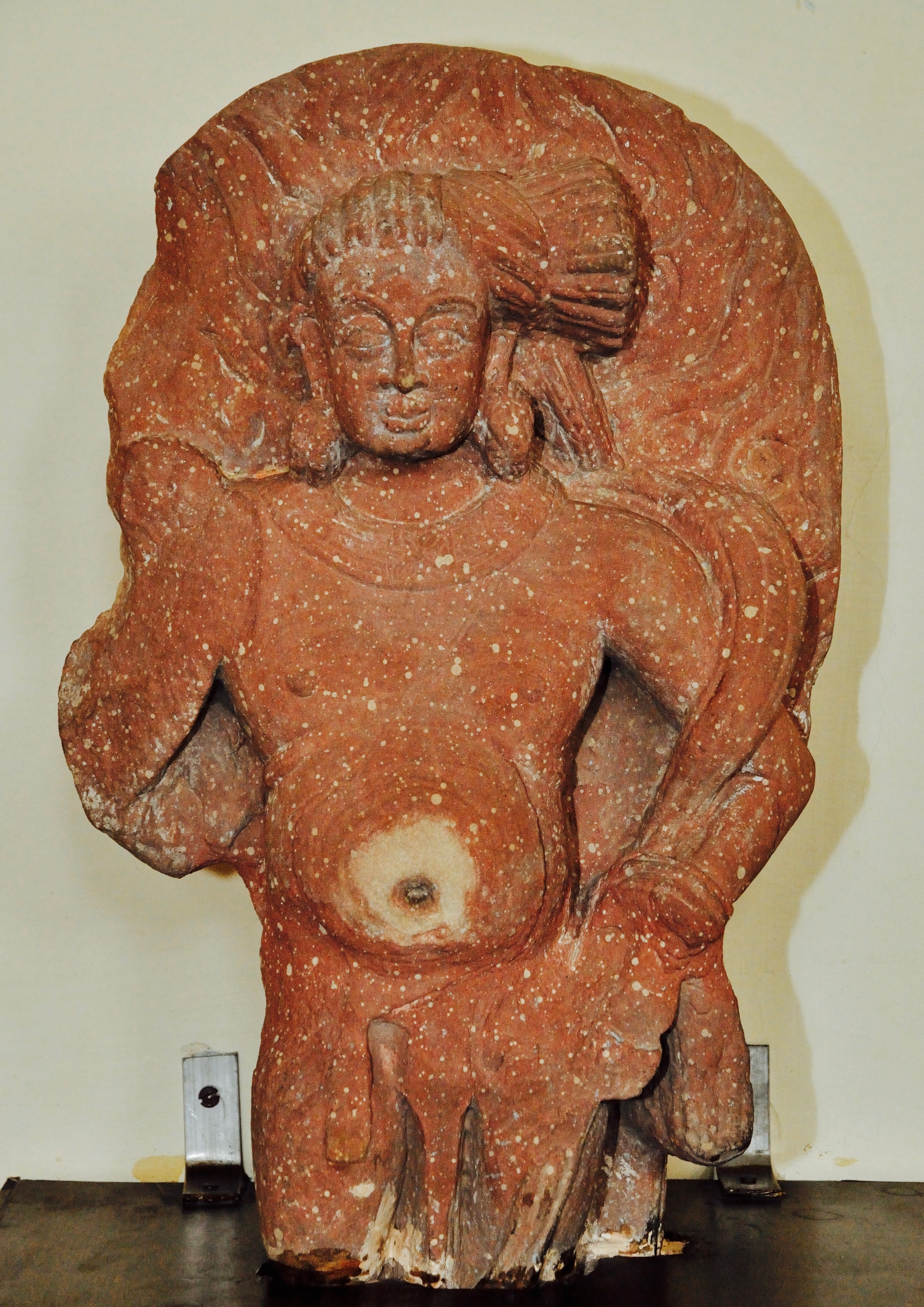
A pre-3rd century CE, Kushan Empire statue of Agni, the Vedic god of fire.

Linguistic evidence from Vedic and Balto-Slavic sources suggests that Proto-Indo-Europeans personified fire as a deity *h₁n̥gʷnis. The Vedic god Agni reflects this figure as the divine fire of heaven, earth, and ritual. Cognates in Balto-Slavic, such as Lithuanian Ugnis and Latvian Uguns, indicate a parallel tradition of sacred fire. Slavic veneration of fire is attested in medieval sources under names such as ogonĭ and the deity Svarožič. Albanian tradition preserves a likely reflex of h₁n̥gʷnis in the fire god Enji, whose name appears in the weekday e enjte ('Thursday'). Fire (zjarri) is deified in Albanian practice and associated with protection, purification, ancestral continuity, agricultural fertility, and the cults of the Sun (Dielli) and the hearth (vatër). In other traditions, as the sacral name of the dangerous fire may have become a word taboo, the reflexes of the Indo-European root *h₁n̥gʷnis served instead as an ordinary term for fire, as in the Latin ignis.

Scholars generally agree that the cult of the hearth dates back to Proto-Indo-European times. The domestic fire required care, offerings, and was ritually transferred when relocating. Indo-Iranian Ātar, Albanian Nëna e Vatrës ('Hearth Mother'), Scythian Tabiti, and the Greek and Roman hearth goddesses Hestia and Vesta all reflect this tradition. Hearth rituals, such as circular hearth-fires and the custom of circling the hearth during marriage or childbirth rites, are shared across Indo-European cultures.

==== Water deities ====
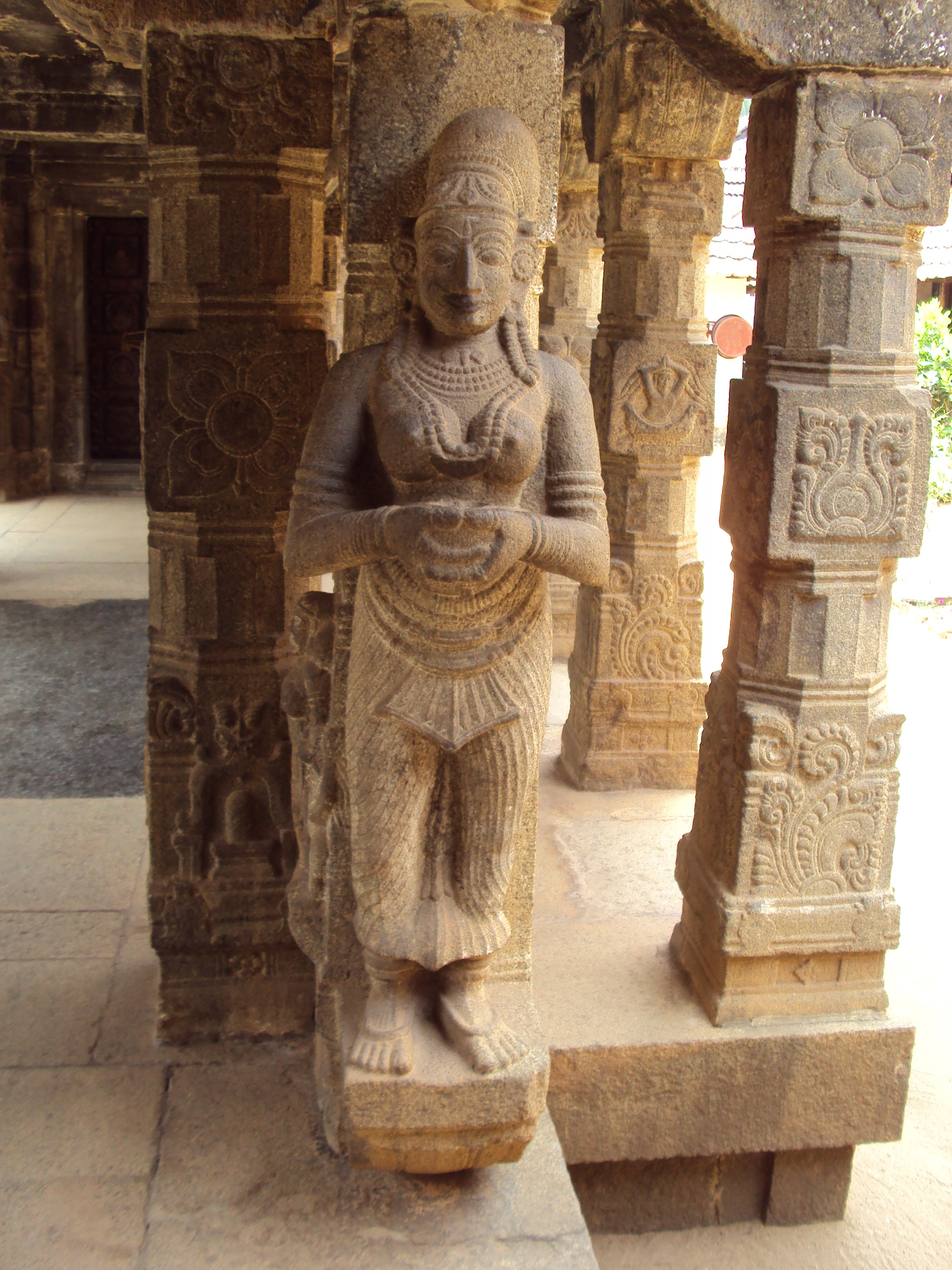
A stone sculpture of an Apsara in the Padmanabhapuran Palace, Kerala.

Based on the similarity of motifs attested over a wide geographical extent, it is very likely that Proto-Indo-European beliefs featured some sorts of beautiful and sometimes dangerous water goddesses who seduced mortal men, akin to the Greek naiads, the nymphs of fresh waters. The Vedic Apsarás are said to frequent forest lakes, rivers, trees, and mountains. They are of outstanding beauty, and Indra sends them to lure men. In Ossetic mythology, the waters are ruled by Donbettyr ("Water-Peter"), who has daughters of extraordinary beauty and with golden hair. In Armenian folklore, the Parik take the form of beautiful women who dance amid nature. The Slavonic water nymphs víly are also depicted as alluring maidens with long golden or green hair who like young men and can do harm if they feel offended. The Albanian mountain nymphs, Perit and Zana, are portrayed as beautiful but also dangerous creatures. Similar to the Baltic nymph-like Laumes, they have the habit of abducting children. The beautiful and long-haired Laumes also have sexual relations and short-lived marriages with men. The Breton Korrigans are irresistible creatures with golden hair wooing mortal men and causing them to perish for love. The Norse Huldra, Iranian Ahuraīnīs and Lycian Eliyãna can likewise be regarded as reflexes of the water nymphs.

A wide range of linguistic and cultural evidence attest the holy status of the terrestrial (potable) waters *h₂ep-, venerated collectively as "the Waters" or divided into "Rivers and Springs". The cults of fountains and rivers, which may have preceded Proto-Indo-European beliefs by tens of thousands of years, was also prevalent in their tradition. Some authors have proposed *Neptonos or *H₂epom Nepōts as the Proto-Indo-European god of the waters. The name literally means "Grandson [or Nephew] of the Waters". Linguists reconstruct his name from that of the Vedic god Apám Nápát, the Roman god Neptūnus, and the Old Irish god Nechtain. Although such a god has been solidly reconstructed in Proto-Indo-Iranian religion, Mallory and Adams nonetheless still reject him as a Proto-Indo-European deity on linguistic grounds.

A river goddess *Deh₂nu- has been proposed based on the Vedic goddess Danu, the Irish goddess Danu, the Welsh goddess Dôn and the names of the rivers Danu, Danube, Don, Dnieper, and Dniester. Mallory and Adams however note that while the lexical correspondence is probable, "there is really no evidence for a specific river goddess" in Proto-Indo-European mythology "other than the deification of the concept of 'river' in Indic tradition". Some have also proposed the reconstruction of a sea god named *Trih₂tōn based on the Greek god Triton and the Old Irish word trïath, meaning "sea". Mallory and Adams also reject this reconstruction as having no basis, asserting that the "lexical correspondence is only just possible and with no evidence of a cognate sea god in Irish."

==== Wind deities ====
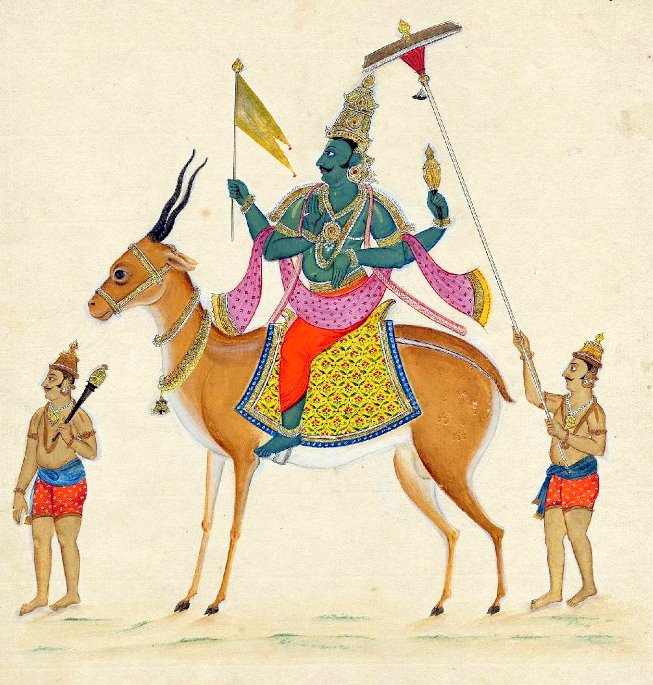
Vayu, Vedic god of the wind, shown upon his antelope vahana.

Evidence for the deification of the wind is found in most Indo-European traditions. The root *h₂weh₁ ("to blow") is at the origin of the two words for the wind: *H₂weh₁-yú- and *H₂w(e)h₁-nt-. The deity is indeed often depicted as a couple in the Indo-Iranian tradition. Vayu-Vāta is a dual divinity in the Avesta, Vāta being associated with the stormy winds and described as coming from everywhere ("from below, from above, from in front, from behind"). Similarly, the Vedic Vāyu, the lord of the winds, is connected in the Vedas with Indra—the king of Svarga Loka (also called Indraloka)—while the other deity Vāta represents a more violent sort of wind and is instead associated with Parjanya—the god of rain and thunder. Other cognates include Hitt. huwant-, Lith. vėjas, Toch. B yente, Lat. uentus, PGmc. *windaz, or Welsh gwynt. The Slavic Viy is another possible equivalent entity. Based on these different traditions, Yaroslav Vassilkov postulated a proto-Indo-European wind deity which "was probably marked by ambivalence, and combined in itself both positive and negative characteristics". This god is hypothesized to have been linked to life and death through giving and taking breath from people.

==== Guardian deity ====
The association between the Greek god Pan and the Vedic god Pūshan was first identified in 1924 by German linguist Hermann Collitz. Both were worshipped as pastoral deities, which led scholars to reconstruct *Péh₂usōn ("Protector") as a pastoral god guarding roads and herds. He may have had an unfortunate appearance, a bushy beard and a keen sight. He was also closely affiliated with goats or bucks: Pan has goat's legs while goats are said to pull the car of Pūshān (the animal was also sacrificed to him on occasion).

==== Cattle deity ====
Jaan Puhvel has proposed a cattle god called *Welnos which he links to the Slavic god Veles, the Lithuanian god Velnias, and less certainly to Old Norse Ullr.

==== Other propositions ====
In 1855, Adalbert Kuhn suggested that the Proto-Indo-Europeans may have believed in a set of helper deities, whom he reconstructed based on the Germanic elves and the Hindu ribhus. Although this proposal is often mentioned in academic writings, very few scholars actually accept it since the cognate relationship is linguistically difficult to justify. While stories of elves, satyrs, goblins and giants show recurrent traits in Indo-European traditions, West notes that "it is difficult to see so coherent an overall pattern as with the nymphs. It is unlikely that the Indo-Europeans had no concept of such creatures, but we cannot define with any sharpness of outline what their conceptions were." A wild god named *Rudlos has also been proposed, based on the Vedic Rudrá and the Old Russian Rŭglŭ. Problematic is whether the name derives from *rewd- ("rend, tear apart"; akin to Lat. rullus, "rustic"), or rather from *rew- ("howl").

Although the name of the divinities are not cognates, a horse goddess portrayed as bearing twins and in connection with fertility and marriage has been proposed based on the Gaulish Epona, Irish Macha and Welsh Rhiannon, with other thematic echos in the Greek and Indic traditions. Demeter transformed herself into a mare when she was raped by Poseidon appearing as a stallion, and she gave birth to a daughter and a horse, Areion. Similarly, the Indic tradition tells of Saranyu fleeing from her husband Vivásvat when she assumed the form of a mare. Vivásvat metamorphosed into a stallion and of their intercourse were born the twin horses, the Aśvins. The Irish goddess Macha gave birth to twins, a mare and a boy, and the Welsh figure Rhiannon bore a child who was reared along with a horse.

=== Societal deities ===
==== Fate goddesses ====
It is highly probable that the Proto-Indo-Europeans believed in three fate goddesses who spun the destinies of mankind. Although such fate goddesses are not directly attested in the Indo-Aryan tradition, the Atharvaveda does contain an allusion comparing fate to a warp. Furthermore, the three Fates appear in nearly every other Indo-European mythology. The earliest attested set of fate goddesses are the Gulses in Hittite mythology, who were said to preside over the individual destinies of human beings. They often appear in mythical narratives alongside the goddesses Papaya and Istustaya, who, in a ritual text for the foundation of a new temple, are described sitting holding mirrors and spindles, spinning the king's thread of life. In the Greek tradition, the Moirai ("Apportioners") are mentioned dispensing destiny in both the Iliad and the Odyssey, in which they are given the epithet Κλῶθες (Klothes, meaning "Spinners").

In Hesiod's Theogony, the Moirai are said to "give mortal men both good and ill" and their names are listed as Klotho ("Spinner"), Lachesis ("Apportioner"), and Atropos ("Inflexible"). In his Republic, Plato records that Klotho sings of the past, Lachesis of the present, and Atropos of the future. In Roman legend, the Parcae were three goddesses who presided over the births of children and whose names were Nona ("Ninth"), Decuma ("Tenth"), and Morta ("Death"). They too were said to spin destinies, although this may have been due to influence from Greek literature.

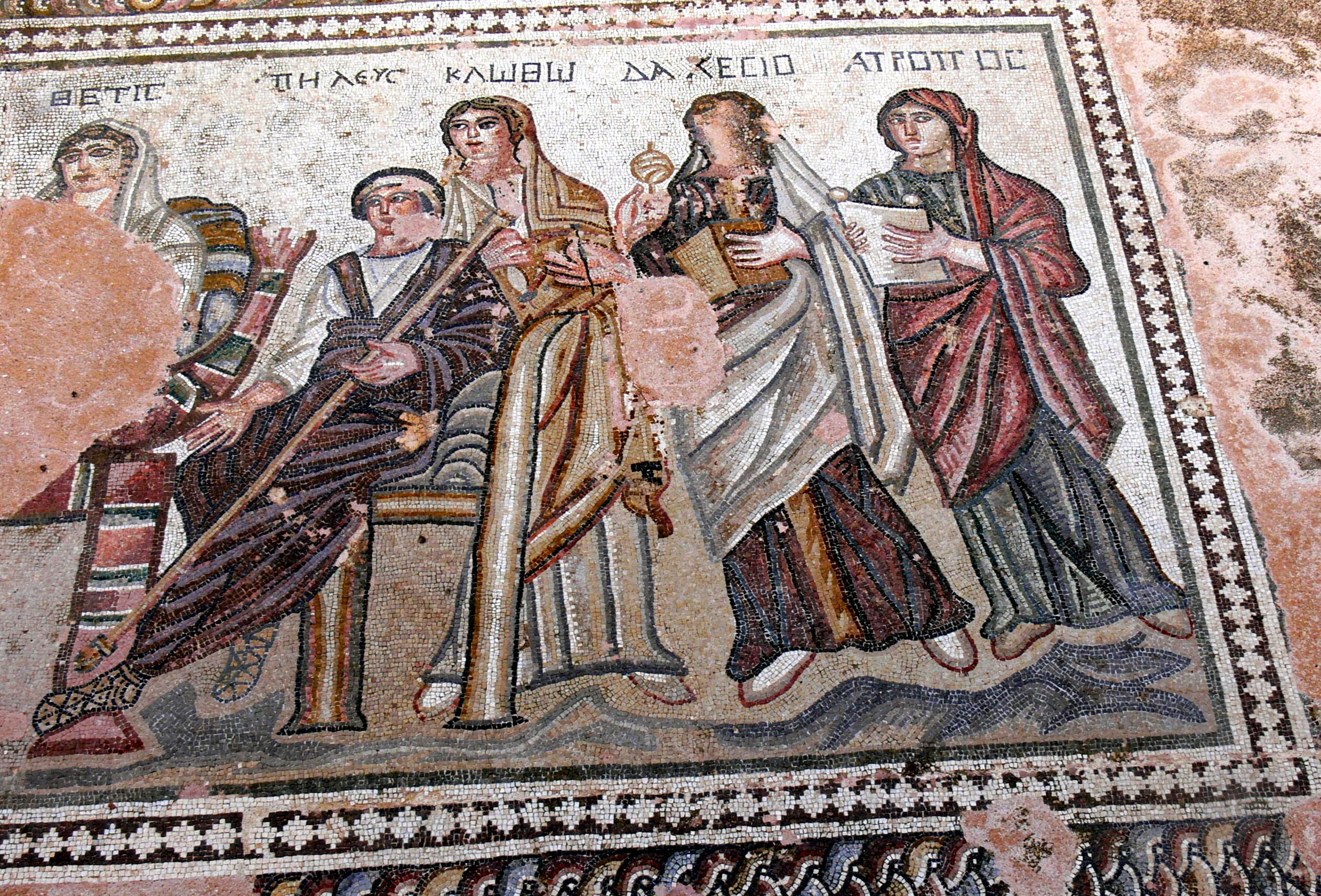
Late second-century AD Greek mosaic from the House of Theseus at Paphos Archaeological Park on Cyprus showing the three Moirai: Klotho, Lachesis, and Atropos, standing behind Peleus and Thetis, the parents of Achilles.

In the Old Norse Völuspá and Gylfaginning, the Norns are three cosmic goddesses of fate who are described sitting by the well of Urðr at the foot of the world tree Yggdrasil. (Note: The names of the individual Norns are given as Urðr ("Happened"), Verðandi ("Happening"), and Skuld ("Due"), but M. L. West notes that these names may be the result of classical influence from Plato.) In Old Norse texts, the Norns are frequently conflated with Valkyries, who are sometimes also described as spinning. Old English texts, such as Rhyme Poem 70, and Guthlac 1350 f., reference Wyrd as a singular power that "weaves" destinies.

Later texts mention the Wyrds as a group, with Geoffrey Chaucer referring to them as "the Werdys that we clepyn Destiné" in The Legend of Good Women. (Note: They also, most famously, appear as the Three Witches in William Shakespeare's Macbeth (c. 1606).) A goddess spinning appears in a bracteate from southwest Germany and a relief from Trier shows three mother goddesses, with two of them holding distaffs. Tenth-century German ecclesiastical writings denounce the popular belief in three sisters who determined the course of a man's life at his birth. An Old Irish hymn attests to seven goddesses who were believed to weave the thread of destiny, which demonstrates that these spinster fate-goddesses were present in Celtic mythology as well.

A Lithuanian folktale recorded in 1839 recounts that a man's fate is spun at his birth by seven goddesses known as the deivės valdytojos and used to hang a star in the sky; when he dies, his thread snaps and his star falls as a meteor. In Latvian folk songs, a goddess called the Láima is described as weaving a child's fate at its birth. Although she is usually only one goddess, the Láima sometimes appears as three. The three spinning fate goddesses appear in Slavic traditions in the forms of the Russian Rožanicy, the Czech and Slovak Sudičky, the Bulgarian Narenčnice or Urisnice, the Polish Rodzanice, the Croatian Rodjenice, the Serbian Sudjenice, and the Slovene Rojenice. Albanian folk tales speak of the Fatit, three old women who appear three days after a child is born and determine its fate, using language reminiscent of spinning.

==== Welfare god ====
A deity of welfare and the community, and/or connected to the building and maintenance of roads or pathways, and/or with healing and the institution of marriage may have existed. Its name may have derived from the noun *h₂eryos (a "member of one's own group", "one who belongs to the community", in contrast to an outsider), also at the origin of the Indo-Iranian *árya, "noble, hospitable", and the Celtic *aryo-, "free man" (Old Irish: aire, "noble, chief"; Gaulish: arios, "free man, lord"). The Vedic god Aryaman is frequently mentioned in the Vedas, and associated with social and marital ties. In the Gāthās, the Iranian god Airyaman seems to denote the wider tribal network or alliance, and is invoked in a prayer against illness, magic, and evil. In the mythical stories of the founding of the Irish nation, the hero Érimón became the first king of the Milesians (the mythical name of the Irish) after he helped conquer the island from the Tuatha Dé Danann. He also provided wives to the Cruithnig (the mythical Celtic Britons or Picts), a reflex of the marital functions of *h₂eryo-men. The Gaulish given name Ariomanus, possibly translated as "lord-spirited" and generally borne by Germanic chiefs, is also to be mentioned.

==== Smith god ====
Although the name of a particular smith god cannot be linguistically reconstructed, smith gods of various names are found in most Proto-Indo-European daughter languages. There is not a strong argument for a single mythic prototype. Mallory notes that "deities specifically concerned with particular craft specializations may be expected in any ideological system whose people have achieved an appropriate level of social complexity". Nonetheless, two motifs recur frequently in Indo-European traditions: the making of the chief god's distinctive weapon (Indra's and Zeus' bolt; Lugh's and Odin's spear and Thor's hammer) by a special artificer, and the craftsman god's association with the immortals' drinking.

==== Love goddess ====
Scholars have suggested a common root *Prëwyâ/*Prëwyos or ?*PriHtu_{8}, for the Sanskrit priya, Greek Aphrodite, Mycenaean Greek theonym pe-re-wa₂, likely related Pamphylian Πρεͷα (Prewa) and Common Germanic Frijjō, that would point to a Proto-Indo-European love god or goddess.

*PriH- is a root for beloved/friend, whereas *PriHyéh₂ means "wife" or "beloved wife" (Note: "The word *prihxeha- ‘wife’ is almost a term of endearment as it derives from *prihxós ‘be pleasing, one’s own’ (see above) and it provides the wife of the Germanic god Oðinn with a name, e.g. ON Frigg (cf. also ON frī ‘beloved, wife’; OE frēo ‘woman’; Skt priyā ‘wife’).") and has descendant forms in many Indo-European languages. It is ancestral to Sanskrit priya "dear, beloved" and Common Germanic Frijjō.

In Latin Venus takes her place. Her name is not cognate at all, but Norse descendants of *PriHyéh₂, Freyr and Freyja belong to the race of so-called Vanir, which comes from the same Proto-Indo-European root *wenh₁-. Freyja is possibly worshipped under the name Perun in southern Slavic-speaking areas. In Albanian she is Perendi, Christianized as St. Prendi. J. Grimm refers to an Old Bohemian form Příje, used as a gloss for Venus in Mater Verborum. Many of these goddesses give their name to the fifth day of the week, Friday. They are also very well known in lesser form such as the Germanic Elves and the Persian Peris, charming and seductive beings in folklore.

There are also masculine forms of this deity, Greek Priapos, borrowed into Latin as Priapus; and Old Norse Freyr.

==== Other propositions ====
The Proto-Indo-Europeans may also have had a goddess who presided over the trifunctional organization of society. Various epithets of the Iranian goddess Anahita and the Roman goddess Juno provide sufficient evidence to solidly attest that she was probably worshipped, but no specific name for her can be lexically reconstructed. Vague remnants of this goddess may also be preserved in the Greek goddess Athena. A decay goddess has also been proposed on the basis of the Vedic Nirṛti and the Roman Lūa Mater. Her names derive from the verbal roots "decay, rot", and they are both associated with the decomposition of human bodies.

Michael Estell has reconstructed a mythical craftsman named *H₃r̥bʰew based on the Greek Orpheus and the Vedic Ribhus. Both are the son of a cudgel-bearer or an archer, and both are known as "fashioners" (*tetḱ-). A mythical hero named *Promāth₂ew has also been proposed, from the Greek hero Prometheus ("the one who steals"), who took the heavenly fire away from the gods to bring it to mankind, and the Vedic Mātariśvan, the mythical bird who "robbed" (found in the myth as pra math-, "to steal") the hidden fire and gave it to the Bhrigus. A medical god has been reconstructed based on a thematic comparison between the Indic god Rudra and the Greek Apollo. Both inflict disease from afar thanks to their bows, both are known as healers, and both are specifically associated with rodents: Rudra's animal is the "rat mole" and Apollo was known as a "rat god".

Some scholars have proposed a war god named *Māwort- based on the Roman god Mars and the Vedic Marutás, the companions of the war-god Indra. Mallory and Adams reject this reconstruction on linguistic grounds. Likewise, some researchers have found it more plausible that Mars was originally a storm deity, while the same cannot be said of Ares.

== Myths ==
=== Serpent-slaying myth ===
One common myth found in nearly all Indo-European mythologies is a battle ending with a hero or god slaying a serpent or dragon of some sort. Although the details of the story often vary widely, several features remain remarkably the same in all iterations. The protagonist of the story is usually a thunder-god, or a hero somehow associated with thunder. His enemy the serpent is generally associated with water and depicted as multi-headed, or else "multiple" in some other way.

Indo-European myths often describe the creature as a "blocker of waters", and his many heads get eventually smashed by the thunder-god in an epic battle, releasing torrents of water that had previously been pent up. The original legend may have symbolized the Chaoskampf, a clash between forces of order and chaos. The dragon or serpent loses in every version of the story, although in some mythologies, such as the Norse Ragnarök myth, the hero or the god dies with his enemy during the confrontation. Historian Bruce Lincoln has proposed that the dragon-slaying tale and the creation myth of *Trito killing the serpent *h₂n̥gʷhis may actually belong to the same original story.

Reflexes of the Proto-Indo-European dragon-slaying myth appear in most Indo-European poetic traditions, where the myth has left traces of the formulaic sentence *(h₁e) gʷʰent h₁ógʷʰim, meaning "[he] slew the serpent".

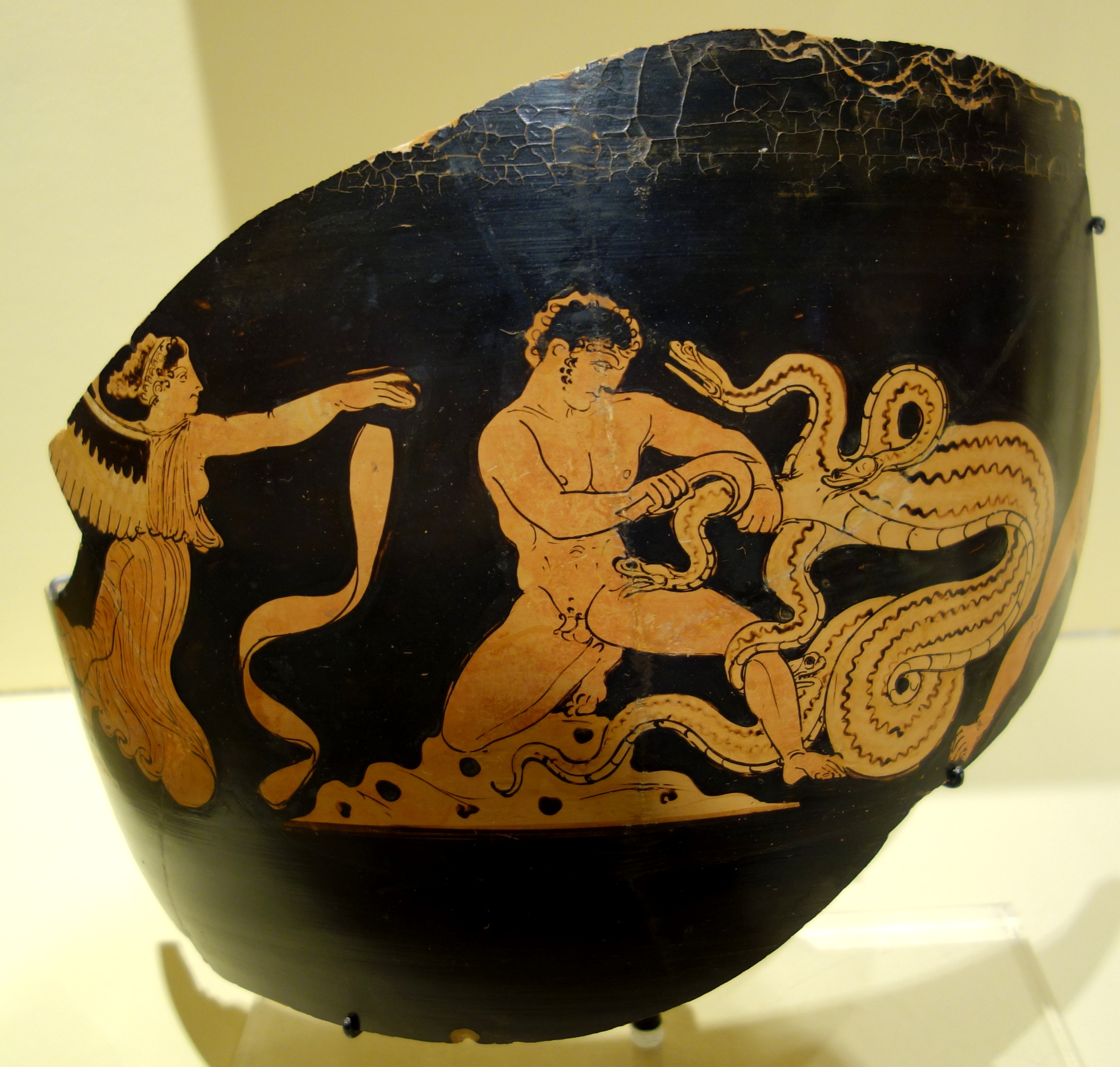
A Greek red-figure vase painting depicting Heracles slaying the Lernaean Hydra, c. 375–340 BC.

In Hittite mythology, the storm god Tarhunt slays the giant serpent Illuyanka, as does the Vedic god Indra the multi-headed serpent Vritra, which has been causing a drought by trapping the waters in his mountain lair. Several variations of the story are also found in Greek mythology. The original motif appears inherited in the legend of Zeus slaying the hundred-headed Typhon, as related by Hesiod in the Theogony, and possibly in the myth of Heracles slaying the nine-headed Lernaean Hydra and in the legend of Apollo slaying the earth-dragon Python. The story of Heracles's theft of the cattle of Geryon is probably also related. Although he is not usually thought of as a storm deity in the conventional sense, Heracles bears many attributes held by other Indo-European storm deities, including physical strength and a penchant for violence and gluttony.

The original motif is also reflected in Germanic mythology. The Norse god of thunder Thor slays the giant serpent Jörmungandr, which lived in the waters surrounding the realm of Midgard. In the Völsunga saga, Sigurd slays the dragon Fafnir and, in Beowulf, the eponymous hero slays a different dragon. The depiction of dragons hoarding a treasure (symbolizing the wealth of the community) in Germanic legends may also be a reflex of the original myth of the serpent holding waters.

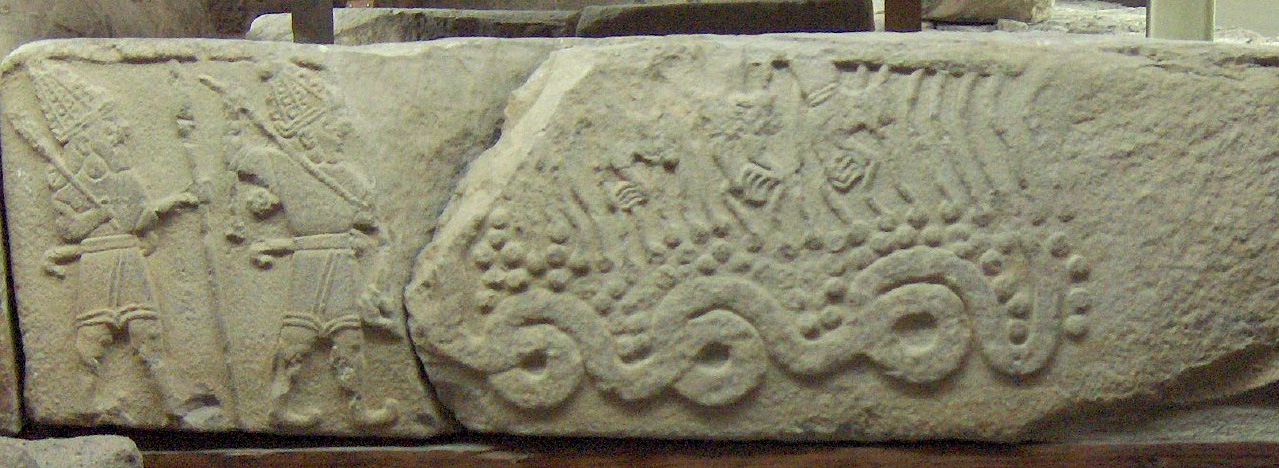
The Hittite god Tarhunt, followed by his son Sarruma, kills the dragon Illuyanka (Museum of Anatolian Civilizations, Ankara, Turkey).

In Vedic and Hindu mythology, the god Indra slays the human-like serpent Vritra in order to release the waters of the world. In later Hindu mythology, Krishna subdues and tames the many-head serpent Kaliya before banishing him and releasing the Yamuna river from the serpent's poison. In Zoroastrianism and in Persian mythology, Fereydun (and later Garshasp) slays the serpent Zahhak.

In Albanian mythology, the drangue, semi-human divine figures associated with thunders, slay the kulshedra, huge multi-headed fire-spitting serpents associated with water and storms. The Slavic god of storms Perun slays his enemy the dragon-god Veles, as does the bogatyr hero Dobrynya Nikitich to the three-headed dragon Zmey. A similar execution is performed by the Armenian god of thunders Vahagn to the dragon Vishap, by the Romanian knight hero Făt-Frumos to the fire-spitting monster Zmeu, and by the Celtic god of healing Dian Cecht to the serpent Meichi.

In Shinto, where Indo-European influences through Vedic religion can be seen in mythology, the storm god Susanoo slays the eight-headed serpent Yamata no Orochi.

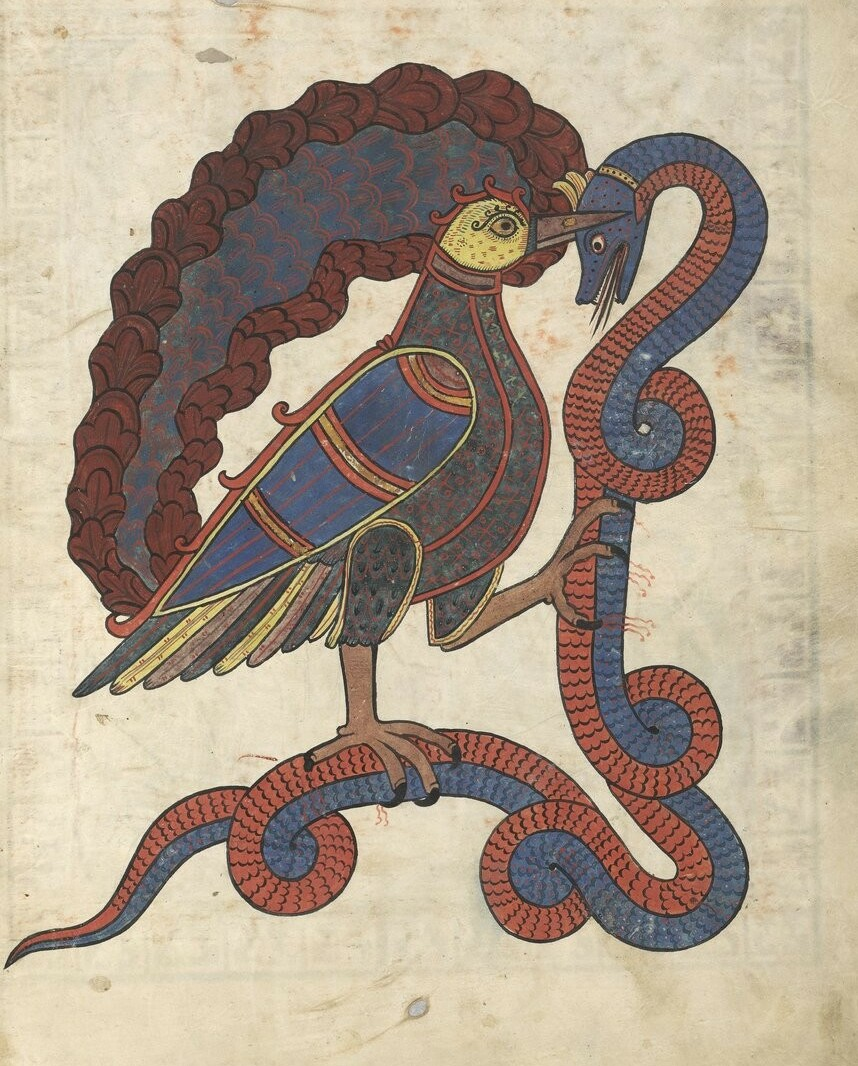
A bird (Christ) victorious over the Serpent (Satan), Saint-Sever Beatus, 11th C.

The Genesis narrative of Judaism and Christianity, as well as the dragon appearing in Revelation 12 can be interpreted as a retelling of the serpent-slaying myth. The Deep or Abyss from or on top of which God is said to make the world is translated from the Biblical Hebrew Tehom (Hebrew: תְּהוֹם). Tehom is a cognate of the Akkadian word tamtu and Ugaritic t-h-m which have similar meaning. As such it was equated with the earlier Babylonian serpent Tiamat.

Folklorist Andrew Lang suggests that the serpent-slaying myth morphed into a folktale motif of a frog or toad blocking the flow of waters.

=== Fire in water ===
Another reconstructed myth is the story of the fire in the waters. It depicts a fiery divine being named *H₂epom Nepōts ('Descendant of the Waters') who dwells in waters, and whose powers must be ritually gained or controlled by a hero who is the only one able to approach it. In the Rigveda, the god Varuna is envisioned as a form of fire residing in the waters. In Celtic mythology, a well belonging to the god Nechtain is said to blind all those who gaze into it.

In an old Armenian poem, a small reed in the middle of the sea spontaneously catches fire and the hero Vahagn springs forth from it with fiery hair and a fiery beard and eyes that blaze as suns. In a ninth-century Norwegian poem by the poet Thiodolf, the name sǣvar niþr, meaning "grandson of the sea", is used as a kenning for fire. Even the Greek tradition contains possible allusions to the myth of a fire-god dwelling deep beneath the sea. The phrase "νέποδες καλῆς Ἁλοσύδνης", meaning "descendants of the beautiful seas", is used in The Odyssey 4.404 as an epithet for the seals of Proteus.

=== King and Virgin ===
The legend of the King and Virgin involves a ruler saved by the offspring of his virgin daughter after seeing his future threatened by rebellious sons or male relatives. The virginity likely symbolizes in the myth the woman that has no loyalty to any man but her father. The child is likewise faithful only to his royal grandfather. The legends of the Indic king Yayāti, saved by his virgin daughter Mādhāvi; the Roman king Numitor, rescued by his chaste daughter Rhea Silvia; the Irish king Eochaid, father of the legendary queen Medb, and threatened by his sons the findemna; and the myth of the Norse virgin goddess Gefjun offering lands to Odin, are generally cited as possible reflexes of an inherited Proto-Indo-European motif. The Irish queen Medb could be cognate with the Indic Mādhāvi, whose name designates either a spring flower, rich in honey, or an intoxicating drink, both deriving from the root *medʰ- ("mead, intoxicating drink").

=== War of the Foundation ===
A myth of the War of the Foundation has also been proposed, involving a conflict between the first two functions (the priests and warriors) and the third function (fertility), which eventually make peace in order to form a fully integrated society. The Norse Ynglingasaga tells of a war between the Æsir (led by Oðinn and Thor) and the Vanir (led by Freyr, Freyja and Njörðr) that ends with the Vanir coming to live among the Æsir. Shortly after the mythical founding of Rome, Romulus fights his wealthy neighbours the Sabines, the Romans abducting their women to eventually incorporate the Sabines into the founding tribes of Rome.

In Vedic mythology, the Aśvins (representing the third function as the Divine Twins) are blocked from accessing the heavenly circle of power by Indra (the second function), who is eventually coerced into letting them in. The Trojan War has been interpreted as a reflex of the myth, with the wealthy Troy as the third function and the conquering Greeks as the first two functions.

=== Binding of evil ===
Jaan Puhvel notes similarities between the Norse myth in which the god Týr inserts his hand into the wolf Fenrir's mouth while the other gods bind him with Gleipnir, only for Fenrir to bite off Týr's hand when he discovers he cannot break his bindings, and the Iranian myth in which Jamshid rescues his brother's corpse from Ahriman's bowels by reaching his hand up Ahriman's anus and pulling out his brother's corpse, only for his hand to become infected with leprosy.

In both accounts, an authority figure forces the evil entity into submission by inserting his hand into the being's orifice, in Fenrir's case the mouth, in Ahriman's the anus, and losing or impairing it. Fenrir and Ahriman fulfill different roles in their own mythological traditions and are unlikely to be remnants of a Proto-Indo-European "evil god"; nonetheless, it is clear that the "binding myth" is of Proto-Indo-European origin.

=== Other propositions ===
==== Death of a son ====
The motif of the death of a son, killed by his father who is unaware of the relationship, is so common among the attested traditions that some scholars have ascribed it to Proto-Indo-European times. In the Ulster Cycle, Connla, son of the Irish hero Cú Chulainn, who was raised abroad in Scotland, unknowingly confronts his father and is killed in the combat. In Russian epic poems, Ilya Muromets must kill his own son, who was also raised apart. The Germanic hero Hildebrant inadvertently kills his son Hadubrant in the Hildebrandslied. The Iranian Rostam unknowingly confronts his son Sohrab in the eponymous epic of the Shāhnāmeh.

King Arthur is forced to kill his son Mordred in battle who was raised far away on the Orkney Islands. In Greek mythology, an intrigue leads the hero Theseus to kill his son Hippolytus. When the lie is finally exposed, Hippolytus is already dead. According to Mallory and Adams, the legend "places limitations on the achievement of warrior prowess, isolates the hero from time by cutting off his generational extension, and re-establishes the hero's typical adolescence by depriving him of a role, as father, in an adult world".

==== "Mead cycle" ====
Although the concept of elevation through intoxicating drink is a nearly universal motif, a Proto-Indo-European myth of the "cycle of the mead", originally proposed by Georges Dumézil and further developed by Jarich G. Oosten (1985), is based on the comparison of Indic and Norse mythologies. In both traditions, gods and demons must cooperate to find a sacred drink providing immortal life. The magical beverage is prepared from the sea, and a serpent, Vāsuki or Jörmungandr, is involved in the quest. The gods and demons eventually fight over the magical potion and the former, ultimately victorious, deprive their enemy of the elixir of life.

== Rituals ==
The Khvalynsk culture, associated with the archaic Proto-Indo-European language, had already shown archeological evidence for the sacrifice of domesticated animals.

=== Priesthood ===
Georges Dumézil suggested that the religious function was represented by a duality, one reflecting the magico-religious nature of priesthood, while the other is involved in religious sanction to human society (especially contracts), a theory supported by common features in Iranian, Roman, Scandinavian and Celtic traditions.

=== Sacrifices ===
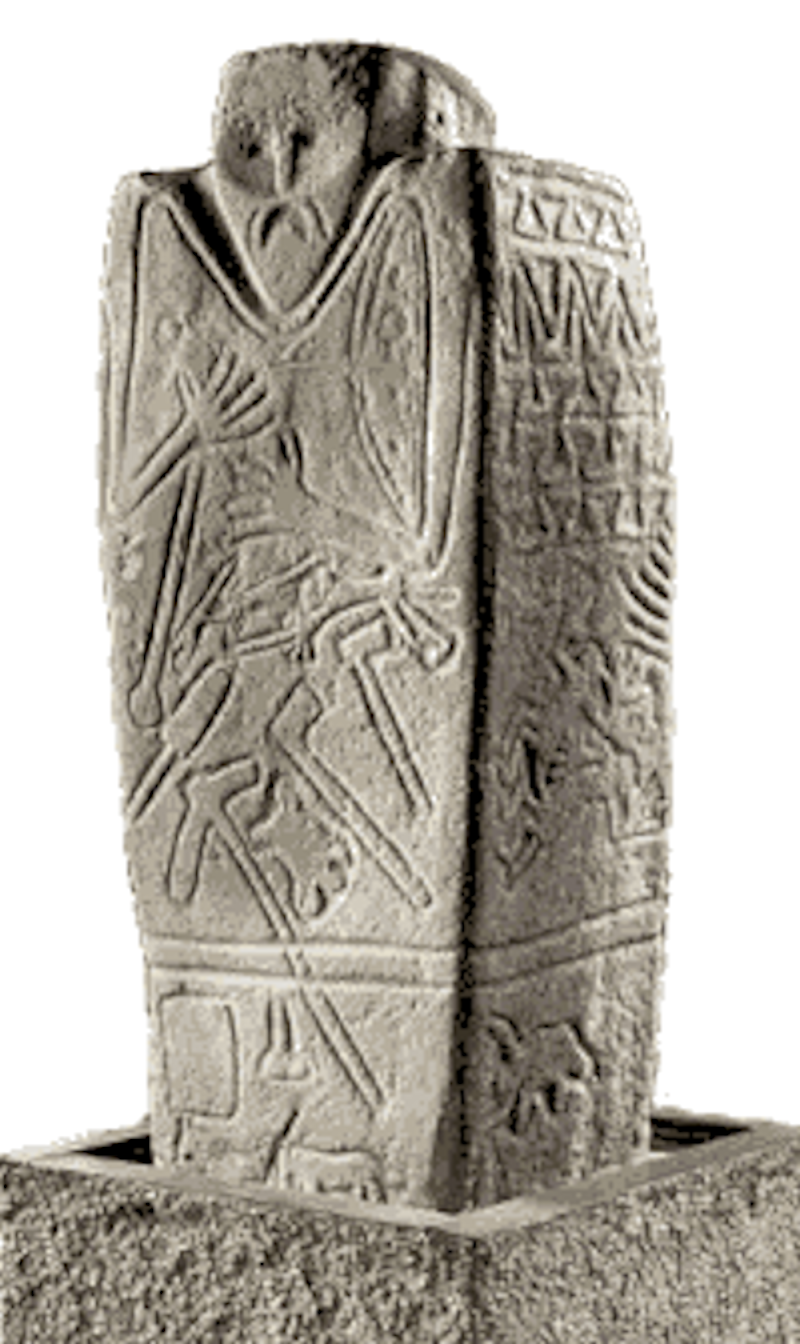
The Kernosovskiy idol, featuring a man with a belt, axes, and testicles to symbolize the warrior. Dated to the middle of the third millennium BC and associated with the late Yamnaya culture.

The reconstructed cosmology of the Proto-Indo-Europeans shows that ritual sacrifice of cattle, the cow in particular, was at the root of their beliefs, as the primordial condition of the world order. The myth of *Trito, the first warrior, involves the liberation of cattle stolen by a three-headed entity named *Ngʷʰi. After recovering the wealth of the people, Trito eventually offers the cattle to the priest in order to ensure the continuity of the cycle of giving between gods and humans. The word for "oath", *h₁óitos, derives from the verb *h₁ey- ("to go"), after the practice of walking between slaughtered animals as part of taking an oath.

Proto-Indo-Europeans likely had a sacred tradition of horse sacrifice for the renewal of kingship involving the ritual mating of a queen or king with a horse, which was then sacrificed and cut up for distribution to the other participants in the ritual. In both the Roman Equus October and the Indic Aśvamedhá, the horse sacrifice is performed on behalf of the warrior class or to a warrior deity, and the dismembered pieces of the animal eventually go to different locations or deities. Another reflex may be found in a medieval Irish tradition involving a king-designate from County Donegal copulating with a mare before bathing with the parts of the sacrificed animal.

The Indic ritual likewise involved the symbolic marriage of the queen to the dead stallion. If Hittite laws prohibited copulation with animals, they made an exception of horses or mules. In both the Celtic and Indic traditions, an intoxicating brewage played a part in the ritual, and the suffix in aśva-medhá could be related to the Old Indic word mad- ("boil, rejoice, get drunk"). Jaan Puhvel has also compared the Vedic name of the tradition with the Gaulish god Epomeduos, the "master of horses".

=== Cults ===
Scholars have reconstructed a Proto-Indo-European cult of the weapons, especially the dagger, which holds a central position in various customs and myths. In the Ossetic Nart saga, the sword of Batradz is dragged into the sea after his death, and the British King Arthur throws his legendary sword Excalibur back into the lake from which it initially came. The Indic Arjuna is also instructed to throw his bow Gandiva into the sea at the end of his career, and weapons were frequently thrown into lakes, rivers or bogs as a form of prestige offering in Bronze and Iron Age Europe.

Reflexes of an ancestral cult of the magical sword have been proposed in the legends of Excalibur and Durandal (the weapon of Roland, said to have been forged by the mythical Wayland the Smith). Among North Iranians, Herodotus described the Scythian practice of worshiping swords as manifestations of "Ares" in the 5th century BC, and Ammianus Marcellinus depicted the Alanic custom of thrusting swords into the earth and worshiping them as "Mars" in the 4th century AD.

== See also ==
- Interpretatio graeca, the comparison of Greek deities to Germanic, Roman, and Celtic deities
- Neolithic religion
- Proto-Indo-European society
