= Priya (given name) =

Priya or Pria
- Gender: Female
- Language: Gujarati; Hindi; Sanskrit; Punjabi; Tamil; Bengali; Thai; Marathi

Origin
- Meaning: "beloved" “favorite” "dear"
- Region of origin: India

Other names
- Alternative spelling: Pria, Priya, Preeya
- Variant forms: Pria, Priya
- Nickname: Pri
- Derived: Sanskrit
- Related names: Frigg

Priya or Pria (Sanskrit: प्रिया, lit. 'dear, beloved', IAST: Priyā) is a common given name in India which is also used in Nepal, Bangladesh, Sri Lanka and Thailand.

It is cognate to the name of the Germanic goddess Frigg; both descend from the Proto-Indo-European stem *priH-o-, meaning "beloved".

== People ==
- Priya A. S., Indian author
- Priya Abraham (born 1963), Indian scientist, medical doctor and virologist
- Priya Ahluwalia, British-Indian-Nigerian fashion designer
- Priya Anand (born 1986), Indian actress and model
- Priya Badlani (born 1986), Indian actress and model
- Priya Balasubramaniam (born 1974), Indian engineer
- Priya Banerjee (born 1991), Canadian actress
- Priya Bapat (born 1986), Indian actress
- Priya Basil (born 1977), British writer
- Priya Bathija (born 1985), Indian actress
- Priya Berde (born 1970), Indian actress
- Priya Bhavani Shankar (born 1989), Indian actress
- Priya Chaudhry, American lawyer
- Priya Cooper (born 1974), Australian swimmer
- Priya Davdra (born 1987), British actress
- Priya David (born 1974), American journalist
- Priya Dutt (born 1966), Indian politician
- Priya Gill (born 1977), Indian actress
- Priya Hassan, Indian actress, director and producer
- Priya Himesh (born 1982), Indian singer
- Priya Hiranandani-Vandrevala (born 1977), Indian entrepreneur and philanthropist
- Priya Kambli (born 1975), Indian photographer
- Priya Kansara (born 1995/1996), British actress
- Priya Kaur-Jones (born 1979), British newsreader and presenter
- Priya Krishna (journalist), Indian-American author and chef
- Priya Kumar (born 1974), Indian writer and motivational speaker
- Priya Lal (born 1993), British-Indian actress, dancer and singer
- Priya Malik (born 1999), Indian weightlifter
- Priya Marathe, Indian actress
- Priya Mishra (born 2004), Indian cricketer
- Priya Paul (born 1967), Indian businesswoman and entrepreneur
- Priya Prakash Varrier (born 1999), Indian actress
- Priya Punia (born 1996), Indian cricketer
- Priya P.V, Indian footballer and manager
- Priya Ragu (born 1986), Swiss singer
- Priya Raina (born 1988), Indian actress
- Priya Rajan (born 1993), Indian politician
- Priya Rajvansh (1937–2000), Indian actress
- Priya Ramani, Indian journalist, writer, and editor
- Priya Ramrakha (1935–1968), Kenyan photojournalist
- Priya Raman (born 1974), Indian actress and producer
- Priya Ranjan Dasmunsi (born 1945), Indian politician and member of the 14th Lok Sabha of India
- Priya Saroj (born 1998), Indian politician
- Priya Satia, American historian
- Priya Sharma (born 1971), British fantasy and horror short-story writer and novelist
- Priya Suriyasena (1952–2024), Sri Lankan singer
- Priya Tendulkar (1954–2002), Indian actress, social activist and writer
- Priya Wal (born 1985), Indian actress

== Fictional characters ==
- Priya Kapoor, from the Australian television soap opera Neighbours
- Priya Koothrappali, from The Big Bang Theory television series
- Priya Mangal, character from the 2022 Pixar film Turning Red
- Priya Nandra-Hart, fictional character from the BBC soap opera, EastEnders
- Priya Sharma, from the British soap opera Emmerdale
- Priya Tsetsang, the original identity of Sierra in the US television series Dollhouse
- Priya, protagonist of The Jasmine Throne by Tasha Suri
- Priya Ramaswami, character from The Sims 2: Seasons

== See also ==
- Preeya Kalidas (born 1980), British-Indian actress and singer
- Priyanka
- Supriya
