= *Péh₂usōn =

Proto-Indo-European pastoral god

Equivalents
- Greek: Hermes (most aspects), Pan (some aspects)
- Hindu: Pushan
- Roman: Mercury (most aspects), Faunus (some aspects)

*Péh₂usōn ("Protector") is a proposed Proto-Indo-European pastoral god associated with the protection of roads and herds.

Reconstructed attributes include a bushy beard and keen sight. The deity is also linked to goats or bucks: the Greek god Pan possesses goat-like features, and goats are described as drawing the chariot of the Vedic god Pūshān, to whom the animal was occasionally offered in sacrifice.

== Name and etymology ==
The Greek name Pan (Πάν) is often linked in scholarship with the Vedic theonym Pūṣan (पूषन्). The comparison is based on an assumed Indo-European ablaut paradigm built on the Proto-Indo-European (PIE) root *peh₂- ('to protect'). On this analysis, Pán would reflect a Proto-Greek form *pauh-on-, itself from a PIE stem *peh₂us-, while the Vedic form Pū́ṣan- would continue the zero-grade formation *ph₂us-. The Arcadian form Paoni (Πάονι) seems to have retained the -ao- vocalism expected from the Proto-Greek diphthong -au-, whereas the Attic–Ionic form Pán would reflect secondary contraction and phonological reduction.

Some scholars, however, including linguist Manfred Mayrhofer, have expressed doubts regarding this connection.

== Reconstruction ==
=== Graeco-Aryan comparison ===
The deity was first proposed on the basis of similarities noted between the Greek god Pan and the Vedic god Pūṣan, an analogy identified in 1924 by German linguist Hermann Collitz. The proposed identification relies on shared features in their pastoral functions, their association with roads and byways, and their common affinity with goats.

Pūṣan's chariot is drawn by goats, and goats were sacrificed to him on occasion. Pan is described as having goat's legs. Both are also portrayed with bushy beards and keen sight. Pūṣan surveys all things, while Pan roams mountains and high places to view the flocks. Pūṣan protects cattle and is a guardian of roads who shields travellers from wolves and brigands. Pan likewise presides over "the rocky tracks", and in Hellenistic Egypt he was worshipped as εὔοδος ("of good journeying").

According to philologist Martin L. West, the reflex may be at least of Graeco-Aryan origin: "Pūshān and Pan agree well enough in name and nature—especially when Hermes is seen as a hypostasis of Pan—to make it a reasonable conclusion that they are parallel reflexes of a prototypical god of ways and byways, a guide on the journey, a protector of flocks, a watcher of who and what goes where, one who can scamper up any slope with the ease of a goat."

=== Relationship with Hermes ===
Minor discrepancies between the two deities may be accounted for by the possibility that several of Pan's original attributes were transferred to Hermes. In some traditions Pan was regarded as Hermes' son, and it has been argued that the two were originally the same deity.

Pan is absent from Homeric and early Greek poetry and only becomes prominent in the 5th century BC, his worship previously seeming to have been limited to Arcadia. His Arcadian cult is often viewed as preserving archaic features of a pastoral mountain god. The Arcadian figure Paon appears to have preserved an older Graeco-Aryan name that elsewhere in Greece had been replaced, by the Mycenaean period, with the title herma-god (hermāhās, the earlier form of Hermēs, Ἑρμῆς). The term herma (ἕρμα) originally referred to an upright stone or cairn marking a path or boundary. Such markers were once associated with Pan, but over time he came to be remembered only as the herma-god (Hermes), and the pillar itself became identified with Hermes as the herm.

Hermes is portrayed as a good lookout, a god of roads, and a guardian of flocks and herds. His mastery of byways, his ability to find hidden objects, and his role as protector of travellers recall aspects of Pūṣan's role as patron of professional trackers who retrieve lost or stolen goods. Both gods are connected with gain, roads, and the safeguarding of property.

=== Other possible reflexes ===
Medieval Lithuanian sources preserve comparable traditions. The 16th-century chronicler Matys Stryjkowski mentions Kielu Dziewos der Reisegott (i.e. Kelių dievas, 'god of roads'), to whom travellers sacrificed before a journey.
