= Priya Chaudhry =

American lawyer

Priya Chaudhry is an American lawyer. She is known for representing Jen Shah, Paul Haggis, and Jonathan Majors. The Hollywood Reporter named Chaudhry one of the 25 "Power Lawyers" it recognized as "Hollywood’s Troubleshooters". Chambers and Partners has ranked Chaudhry for over five years and she has been named a "Super Lawyer" for over 15 years.

== Early life ==
Chaudhry's family moved from Delhi to Cleveland, Ohio, when she was one year old. Seeing how police treated her neighbors, who were largely poor people of color, inspired Chaudhry to become a defense lawyer.

Chaudhry studied pre-medical and earned a Juris Doctor degree from Northwestern University.

== Career ==
Chaudhry worked as a public defender in Seattle for two years, later moving to New York City and being hired by a boutique firm focused on white-collar crimes. She then ran her own practice for six years before becoming a partner at Harris, St. Laurent & Chaudhry. In 2019, she left to open Chaudhry Law, with a focus on criminal cases.

In 2022, Chaudhry represented The Real Housewives of Salt Lake City star Jen Shah in a telemarketing fraud case. Shah pleaded guilty in July 2022. In March 2023, Chaudhry said Shah owed her over $124,000 in legal fees.

In 2023, Chaudhry defended former Boston prosecutor and prominent criminal justice reform advocate Adam Foss against charges of rape and sexual abuse. The jury acquitted Foss on all charges.

Chaudhry represented actor Jonathan Majors in his trial for assaulting his former girlfriend Grace Jabbari. Due to her approach in cross-examining Jabbari, the judge ruled that the jurors could see previously sealed text messages from Majors. Majors was convicted of reckless misdemeanor assault of Jabbari, though the jury acquitted him of all intentional counts.

For nearly two decades, Chaudhry has taught trial advocacy at institutions such as the Benjamin N. Cardozo School of Law, Rutgers Law School, and the New Jersey Office of the Public Defender; she has also lectured as adjunct faculty at Columbia Law School and Fordham University School of Law.

In 2026, Chaudhry was hired to represent Yale University student Ari Shtein, who was charged with sexually assaulting a mother in front of her children on the New York City Subway.

== Personal life ==
Chaudhry is married to Andrew Bourke, a crisis communications expert.
