= Priyankara =

Priyankara is both a given name and a surname. Notable people with the name include:

- Priyankara Rathnayake (born 1964), Sri Lankan actor
- Priyankara Silva (born 1975), Sri Lankan cricketer
- Priyankara Wickramasinghe (born 1977), Sri Lankan cricketer
- Jagath Priyankara (born 1979), Sri Lankan politician
- Nuwan Priyankara (born 1976), Sri Lankan cricketer
