= Cicolluis =

Ancient Gaulish war god

Cicolluis (also Cicollus, dative Cicollui, reconstructed Gaulish *Cicolluos) was a Gaulish god identified with the Roman god Mars through the interpretatio romana and so usually named Mars Cicolluis. He was the tutelary god of the Lingones, a people of eastern Gaul in the region of modern Langres and Dijon. His cult is attested almost entirely within their territory, as well as by Lingones serving on the Rhine. In most of the dedications, he is paired with the Celtic earth-goddess Litavis.

== Name ==
The god is named in Latin as Cicolluis or Cicollus, occurring in the dedications in the dative Cicollui. The name is recorded only in dedications made by Lingones, which marks Cicolluis out as the particular god of that people.

The Gaulish theonym Cicolluos is generally taken as a compound of two Celtic elements. The first, cico-, means 'meat', flesh' or 'muscle' and, by metonymy, 'breast' (cf. Old Irish cích 'breast'). The second, -oll-, means 'great'. On this basis, Xavier Delamarre glosses it as 'Big-Muscle', Emily Lyle as 'Great-Breast', and Patrice Lajoye is 'the muscular one'. Bernhard Maier instead reads the name as 'the great protector', taking cích in the sense 'protection' and comparing the Gaulish divine name Anextlomarus, which has the same meaning.

As a divine name, Cicolluis is recorded only in dedications made by Lingones, which marks it out as the particular god of that people. The same form is also borne as a personal name on bronze objects from Vindonissa (Windisch) in Switzerland. Maier lists the Vindonissa piece among the dedications to the god, but Patrice Lajoye holds that it is uncertain whether the name is that of a deity or a person there.

== Interpretation ==
=== God of the Lingones ===
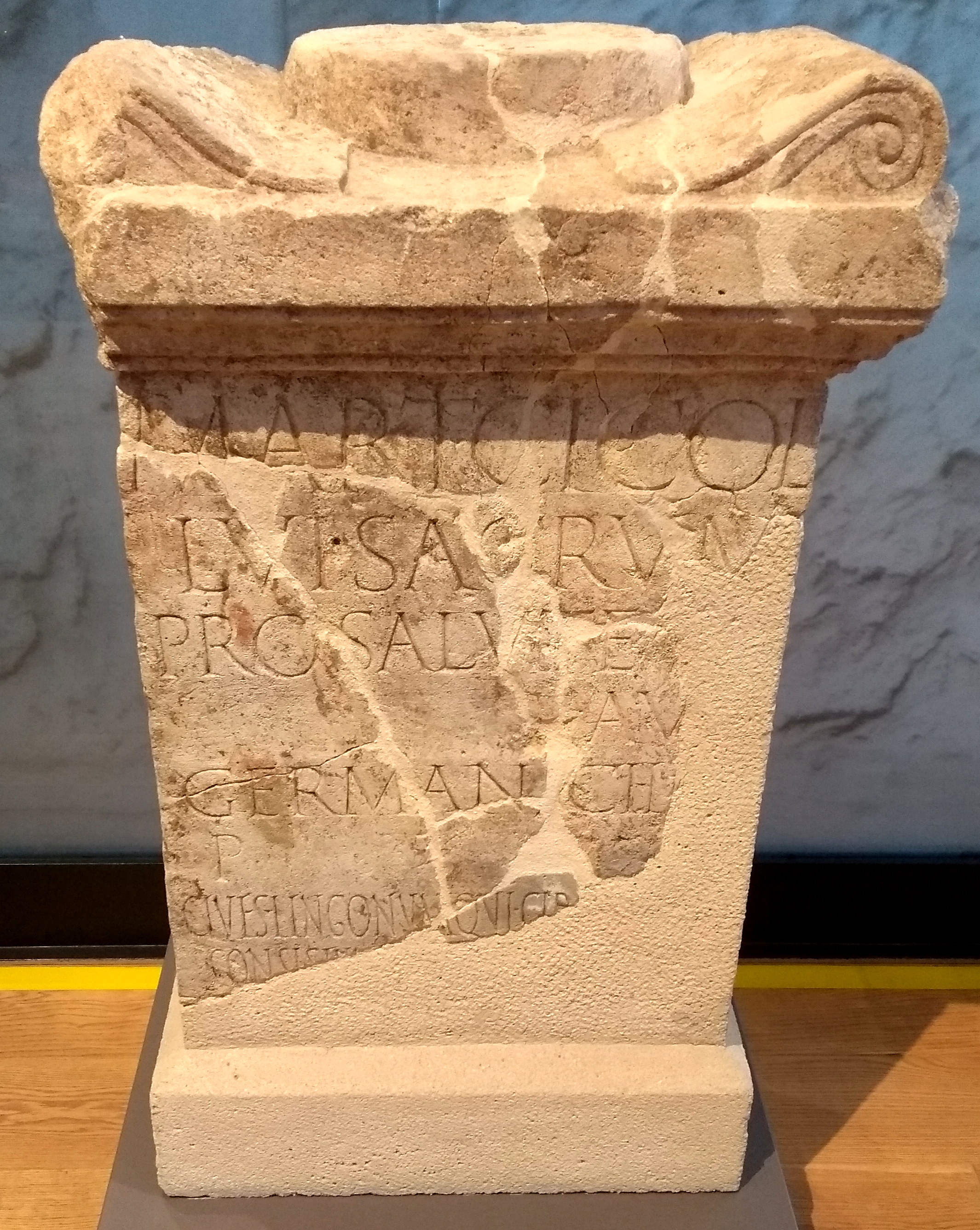
Altar for Mars Cicollus (AE 1981, 690)

Mars Cicolluis has long been recognised as the tutelary god of the Lingones. Marie-Thérèse Raepsaet-Charlier treats the equation of Cicolluis with Mars an official interpretatio romana rather than a slow fusion. On this view, it was not a gradual blending of two figures but as a deliberate choice of the local elite when the civitas was organised under Augustus. In her account the god is neither Gaulish nor Roman but Lingon, a status confirmed by his exclusive use among that people. Andreas Hofeneder likewise lists Cicolluis as the local Lingon equation of the god with Mars, similar to Camulus of the Remi and Caturix of the Helvetii.

The god appears to have had no temple in the civitas capital at Langres (Andematunnum). Raepsaet-Charlier connects this with Roman practice, in which the temple of Mars stood outside the city, in the same manner the Campus Martius lay beyond the pomerium of Rome. A large sanctuary of Mars and Bellona has in fact been found immediately south of Langres, while Mars Cicolluis and Litavis were honoured at the territorial sanctuary of Mâlain. The find-spots of these cults, at Mâlain and Aignay-le-Duc, mark out the edge of the Lingon territory, which for Raepsaet-Charlier shows how the community defined its land through its religious sites.

=== Consort ===
In most of the dedications Cicolluis is paired with the goddess Litavis, whose name derives from a Celtic word for the earth. John T. Koch describes Litavis as an earth-goddess and Cicolluis as her consort.

In one dedication from Mâlain the consort's native name is replaced by that of the Roman war-goddess Bellona. Venceslas Kruta notes that Bellona appears in Gaul as the companion of Mars Cicolluis in the Côte-d'Or. Andreas Hofeneder treats Litavis and Bellona as the native and the Latin name of the same figure. He cautions, however, that other dedications naming Mars and Bellona in Celtic territory may refer to the Roman deities rather than to Cicolluis and his consort.

In most of the dedications Cicolluis is paired with the goddess Litavis. Her name derives from a Celtic word for the earth, cognate with Sanskrit pṛthivī and Old English folde 'earth', from an Indo-European term meaning 'the broad one'. The same word gave a Celtic name for Brittany, surviving as Welsh Llydaw. John Koch describes Litavis as an earth-goddess and Cicolluis as her consort, and connects her name with the personal name Litaviccus, borne by an Aeduan leader in Caesar's account of the Gallic Wars. In one dedication from Mâlain the consort's native name is replaced by that of the Roman war-goddess Bellona, and Venceslas Kruta notes that Bellona appears in Gaul as the companion of Mars Cicolluis in the Côte-d'Or. Andreas Hofeneder treats Litavis and Bellona as the native and the Latin name of the same figure. He cautions, however, that other dedications naming Mars and Bellona in Celtic territory may refer to the Roman deities rather than to Cicolluis and his consort.

=== Irish comparison ===
Christian-Joseph Guyonvarc'h connected the god's name with that of the Irish Fomorian demon Cichol. Both names appear to mean 'the muscular one', and Patrice Lajoye treats them as exact linguistic equivalents. Despite this, Lajoye argues that the Cicolluis and the Cichol are joined by only very weak links, and that their identity is far from certain. He argues that the nature of the divine couple may nonetheless make such a link intelligible, and reads Litavis as the earth in a dark, chthonic aspect, while Cichol is a primordial being, named in Irish tradition as a contemporary of Partholón and so older than the Fomoire whom the Tuatha Dé Danann would later defeat. On this view Cicolluis and Litavis form a pair of chthonic and primordial deities, worshipped for the fertility of the land but also tied to death, a civic cult far removed from that of the celestial gods Grannus and Sirona.

The comparative use of medieval Irish material to interpret Gallo-Roman cults is, however, treated with caution by other scholars. Marie-Thérèse Raepsaet-Charlier regards it as resting on an unverified and improbable assumption of continuity, since the Irish narratives come from regions that were never under Roman rule.

== Epigraphy ==
Cicolluis is known from a small group of Latin votive inscriptions. Almost all come from the territory of the Lingones in the modern Côte-d'Or, and most name the god together with the goddess Litavis. The cult centres on the sanctuary of Mâlain, which has produced most of the dedications. Two further altars were set up by Lingones outside their own territory, one on the Rhine at Xanten and one on the Sequanian border at Mutigney. Patrice Lajoye lists a further, fragmentary dedication from Ruffey-lès-Echirey.

In most of the dedications the god is paired with Litavis, whose name is replaced in one Mâlain inscription by that of the Roman war-goddess Bellona. Two dedications link the god with the imperial cult, through the domus divina at Dijon and the formula Augusto sacrum at Aignay-le-Duc.

Text	Find-spot	Divine name(s)	Translation	Reference	Comments
Marti Ci/col(l)ui / Coelius Patri[an]us / pro salute / Patriani filii sui / v(otum) s(olvit) l(ibens) m(erito)	Mâlain, territory of the Lingones	Mars Cicolluis	To Mars Cicolluis, Coelius Patrianus, for the safety of his son Patrianus, fulfilled his vow willingly and deservedly.	CIL XIII, 5597	From the sanctuary of Mâlain, the main centre of the cult.
[Ma]rti Cic[ollui] / [e]t Bell[onae] / [...]	Mâlain, territory of the Lingones	Mars Cicolluis (with Bellona)	To Mars Cicolluis and to Bellona ...	CIL XIII, 5598	The only dedication in which the consort is named Bellona rather than Litavis.
Marti Ci/collui et / Litavi / [...]	Mâlain, territory of the Lingones	Mars Cicolluis (with Litavis)	To Mars Cicolluis and to Litavis ...	CIL XIII, 5599	
[Marti Cicollui] / et Lita[vi] / Cresce[ns] / Seni M[ar]/tialis [...]	Mâlain, territory of the Lingones	Mars Cicolluis (with Litavis)	To Mars Cicolluis and to Litavis, Crescens, son of Sennius Martialis ...	CIL XIII, 5600	Dated to the 2nd century AD.
[Mar]ti Ci/[co]llui et Li/tavi / L(ucius) Mattius / Aeternus / ex voto	Mâlain, territory of the Lingones	Mars Cicolluis (with Litavis)	To Mars Cicolluis and to Litavis, Lucius Mattius Aeternus, in fulfilment of a vow.	CIL XIII, 5601	
[Marti Cicollui] / et Litavi / ex voto / suscepto / v(otum) s(olvit) l(ibens) m(erito)	Mâlain, territory of the Lingones	Mars Cicolluis (with Litavis)	To Mars Cicolluis and to Litavis, the vow having been undertaken, fulfilled willingly and deservedly.	CIL XIII, 5602	
[...] Albinus [...] / [Marti] Cico[llui ...]	Mâlain, territory of the Lingones	Mars Cicolluis	... Albinus ... to Mars Cicolluis ...	CIL XIII, 5604	Fragmentary.
In h(onorem) d(omus) d(ivinae) / deo Marti / Cicollui / Pudens / Pudentiani / fil(ius)	Dijon (Divio), territory of the Lingones	Mars Cicolluis (with the imperial domus divina)	In honour of the divine house, to the god Mars Cicolluis, Pudens, son of Pudentianus (set this up).	CIL XIII, 5479	Dated to the 3rd century AD. Also published as ILS 4554.
Aug(usto) sac(rum) / deo Marti Ci/collui et Litavi / P(ublius) Attius Paterc[l]u[s] / v(otum) s(olvit) l(ibens) m(erito)	Aignay-le-Duc, territory of the Lingones	Mars Cicolluis (with Litavis)	Sacred to Augustus, to the god Mars Cicolluis and to Litavis, Publius Attius Paterclus fulfilled his vow willingly and deservedly.	CIL XIII, 2887	The dedication couples the god with the imperial cult through the formula Augusto sacrum. From near the frontier with the Mandubii. Also published as ILS 4555.
C(aius) Iul(ius) Tutillus C(ai) Iul(i) Tuti filius / sacerd(os) Augustor(um) statuam / ex testamento poni iussit / ex HS n(ummum) XXXXVIII(milibus) M(arti) Cicollui	Mutigney, on the Sequanian border	Mars Cicolluis	Caius Iulius Tutillus, son of Caius Iulius Tutus, priest of the emperors, ordered by his will that a statue be set up to Mars Cicolluis at a cost of 48,000 sesterces.	AE 2004, 998	Set up by a sacerdos Augustorum at a frontier sanctuary shared with the Sequani. Dated to the later 2nd century AD.
Marti Cicol/lui sacrum / pro salute ⟦Ne/ronis Caes(aris)⟧ Au[g(usti)] / German[i]ci I[mp(eratoris)] / p(atris) [p(atriae)] / cives Lingonum qui Cib[ernoduro] / consistun[t]	Xanten (Colonia Ulpia Traiana), Germania Inferior	Mars Cicolluis	Sacred to Mars Cicolluis. For the safety of Nero Caesar Augustus Germanicus Imperator, father of the fatherland, the citizens of the Lingones who reside at Cibernodurum (set this up).	AE 1981, 690	The earliest of the dedications, set up under Nero (AD 54 to 68) by citizens of the Lingones living on the Rhine at Cibernodurum. The emperor's name was erased after his damnatio memoriae. Like the contemporary altar to Mars Camulus at Rindern, it was dedicated for Nero's safety.
