= Litavis =

Gaulish goddess

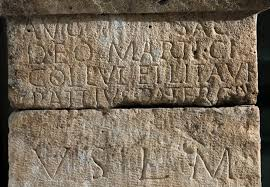
Roman-period dedication naming Litavis together with Mars Cicolluis (deo Marti Cicollui et Litavi, 'to the god Mars Cicolluis and Litavis')

Litavis (Gaulish: Litauī, 'Earth', literally 'the Broad One') is a Gaulish earth-goddess known from votive inscriptions of east-central Gaul. She is named only as the partner of a god equated with the Roman Mars: Cicolluis in the territory of the Lingones, and Menobus at the frontier of the Sequani. Her name comes from a Proto-Celtic adjective meaning 'broad' and is cognate with the name of the Vedic earth-goddess Pṛthivī. The same root produced the early medieval names for Brittany (Welsh Llydaw, Old Irish Letha).

== Name ==
The Latin dedications give the goddess in the dative, Litavi. The Gaulish nominative was Litauī, from Proto-Celtic *ɸlitawī, the feminine of the adjective *ɸlitano- ('broad'). A masculine theonym Cobledu-litavus is also recorded among the Petrocorii, taken by some as a god of springs and by others as an epithet of Apollo.

Cognates of Litauī survive in Old Irish lethan, Middle Welsh llydan and Old Breton litan, all meaning 'broad'. The Proto-Celtic form continues Proto-Indo-European *pl̥th₂wih₂ ('the broad one'), the feminine of the adjective *pl̥th₂u- ('broad'). The form *pl̥th₂wih₂ is commonly interpreted as an epithet of the Proto-Indo-European Earth-goddess *déʰǵʰōm. It underlies the name of the Vedic earth-goddess Pṛthivī, the Greek naiad Plataia, and ritual expressions such as Old Hittite palḫiš dankuiš daganzipaš ('broad dark earth-genius') and Young Avestan ząm pərəθβīm ('broad earth').

The Insular Celtic reflexes of an earlier *Litawia ('the land, the country') became the names for the Brittany Peninsula: Welsh Llydaw, Old Breton Letau, Old Irish Letha ('Armorica'), and the Latinised Letavia. Rudolf Thurneysen proposed that these forms reflect a semantic development from an ancient term meaning 'broad land, continent', later applied to the part of the European mainland nearest the British Islands.

The element litavi- is also productive in Gaulish personal names. Julius Caesar names two Aeduan nobles formed on it, Litaviccus, whose coinage reads Litavicos, and Convictolitavis. The name Litavicos is cognate with Welsh Llydewig ('pertaining to Brittany'), pointing to a shared Proto-Celtic personal name *Litauīkos ('possessor, or sovereign, of the land').

== Interpretation ==
The meaning of the name has led scholars to treat Litavis as an earth-goddess, that is the 'earth' seen as a deified entity.

Litavis is known only as the consort of a war-god, a pattern that recurs in Gaulish religion, where a goddess is joined to a god in a divine couple. In the surviving dedications the male partner carries the name of Mars: Mars Cicolluis in the Côte-d'Or texts and Mars Menobus at Dammartin-Marpain.

Marie-Thérèse Raepsaet-Charlier has argued that the cult of Mars Cicolluis and Litavis helped to mark out the territory of the Lingones, Mars Cicolluis being the chief god of that people. The pair was honoured at the territorial sanctuary of Mâlain, on the edge of the pagus of the Mandubii at Aignay-le-Duc, and at a border sanctuary towards the Sequani. On this reading the sites where the couple was worshipped trace the frontier of the Lingon territory.

The pair has also been interpreted as deities of the fertile and nourishing earth. André Buisson read Mars Cicolluis and Litavis as peaceful powers of agrarian plenty, worshipped at springs and river confluences. (Note: Buisson also glossed the name Cicolluis as 'the Nourisher' (from cico-, 'breast'), which he took to suit Litavis as an earth-goddess. The meaning of Cicolluis is disputed, however, and Bernhard Maier renders the same name 'great protector'.)

== Epigraphy ==
Litavis is attested only in inscriptions, always beside a god assimilated to Mars. Five dedications from the Côte-d'Or, in the land of the Lingones, name her with Mars Cicolluis: one from Aignay-le-Duc and four from Mâlain (ancient Mediolanum). (Note: John T. Koch counts four dedications from the Côte-d'Or, leaving aside the fragmentary CIL XIII, 5600, in which the god's name is restored.) A sixth, a bronze plaque from Dammartin-Marpain on the frontier with the Sequani, pairs her instead with a Mars called Menobus, an epithet not otherwise recorded.

The dedicants bear Roman or Gaulish names, and several identify themselves as citizens of the Lingones. At Aignay-le-Duc the text opens with the formula Augusto sacrum, which links the pair to the imperial cult.

| Text | Find-spot | Divine name | Translation | Reference | Comments |
|---|---|---|---|---|---|
| Aug(usto) sac(rum) deo Marti Cicollui et Litavi P(ublius) Attius Paterc[l]u[s] v(otum) s(olvit) l(ibens) m(erito) | Aignay-le-Duc | Mars Cicolluis, Litavis | Sacred to Augustus. To the god Mars Cicolluis and Litavis, Publius Attius Paterclus fulfilled his vow, willingly and deservedly. | CIL XIII, 2887 | The opening Augusto sacrum associates the pair with the imperial cult. |
| Marti Cicollui et Litavi [...] | Mâlain (Mediolanum) | Mars Cicolluis, Litavis | To Mars Cicolluis and Litavis ... | CIL XIII, 5599 | |
| [Marti Cicollui] et Lita[vi] Cresce[ns] Seni M[ar]tialis | Mâlain (Mediolanum) | Mars Cicolluis, Litavis | To Mars Cicolluis and Litavis, Crescens, of Senius Martialis ... | CIL XIII, 5600 | The reading is fragmentary. The name of Mars Cicolluis is entirely restored. |
| [Mar]ti Cicollui et Litavi L(ucius) Mattius Aeternus ex voto | Mâlain (Mediolanum) | Mars Cicolluis, Litavis | To Mars Cicolluis and Litavis, Lucius Mattius Aeternus, in fulfilment of a vow. | CIL XIII, 5601 | |
| [Marti Cicollui] et Litavi ex voto suscepto v(otum) s(olvit) l(ibens) m(erito) | Mâlain (Mediolanum) | Mars Cicolluis, Litavis | To Mars Cicolluis and Litavis, the vow having been undertaken, he fulfilled it willingly and deservedly. | CIL XIII, 5602 | |
| Titalatus Sesti filius civis Lingon(us) Marti Menobi et Litavi v(otum) s(olvit) l(ibens) m(erito) | Dammartin-Marpain | Mars Menobus, Litavis | Titalatus, son of Sestus, a citizen of the Lingones, to Mars Menobus and Litavis fulfilled his vow, willingly and deservedly. | AE 2010, 1066 | Bronze tabula ansata found in 2008. Here Litavis is paired with Mars under the epithet Menobus, otherwise unrecorded. |
