= Château de Rocheprise =

Château in Côte-d'Or, France

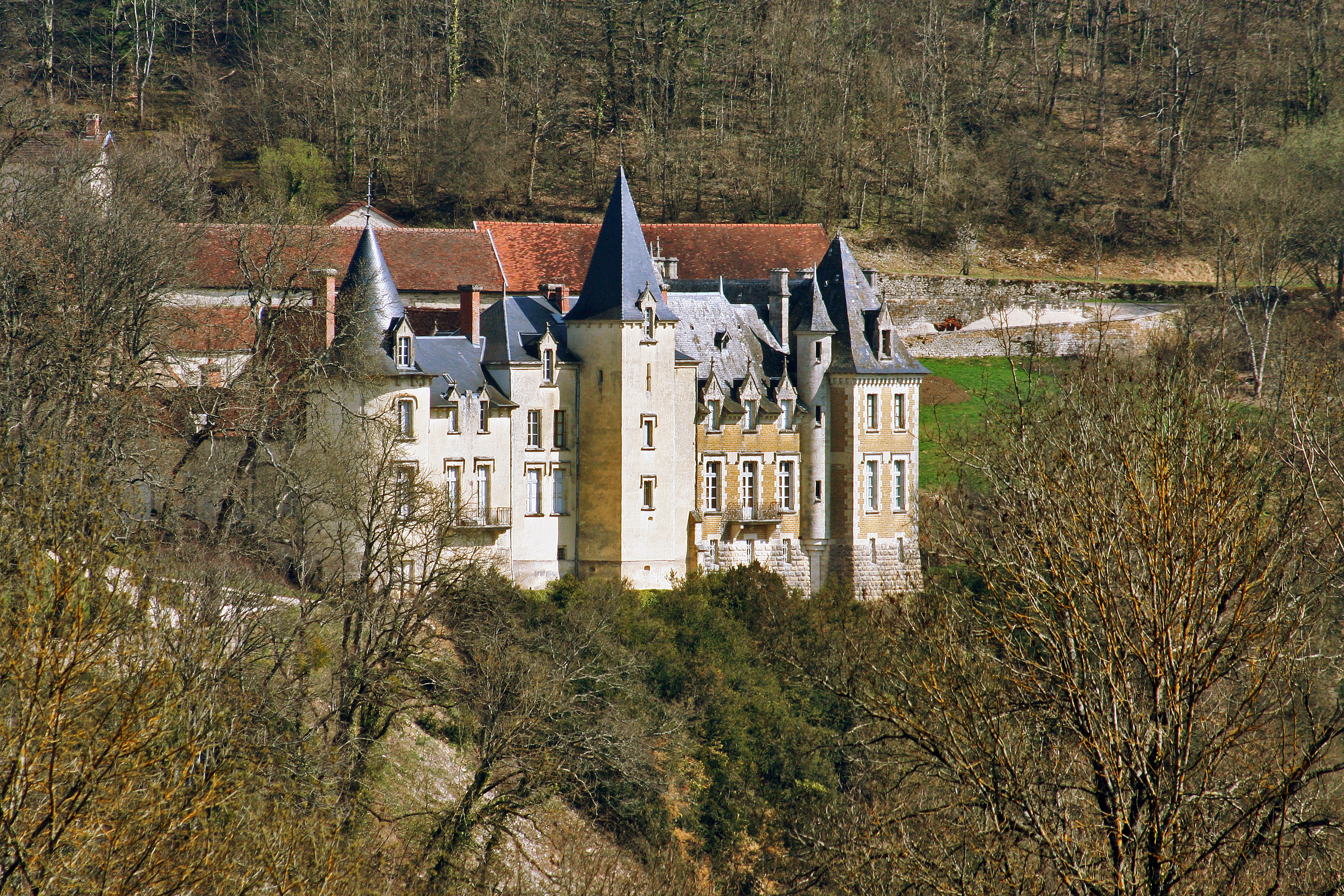
- Interactive map of the Château de Rocheprise area

General information
- Status: Extant
- Architectural style: French Renaissance
- Location: Brémur-et-Vaurois, France
- Coordinates: 47.7329°N 4.6031°E
- Construction started: 1551

The Château de Rocheprise is a French chateau, located in Bremur-et-Vaurois, in the French department of Côte-d'Or, on the right bank of the upper valley of the River Seine. Originally built in the mid 16th century, the chateau is an example of revival French Renaissance architecture. It remains in private ownership, and is not open to the public.

== Architecture ==
Though construction of the chateau began in 1551, Rocheprise has been altered substantially since. The drawbridge tower dates from the sixteenth century, as does the dovecote. However, the main towers were built in circa 1870.

The facades, the roof and the dovecote have been listed in the French inventory of historic monuments since 1975.

== History ==
In 1940, during the Second World War, German troops destroyed most of the furniture and vandalised the library.

Stage 7 of the 2017 Tour de France passed the chateau on 7 July.
