= Camulus =

Ancient Celtic war god

Camulus or Camulos (Gaulish: Camulos) was a god of Gaulish and Brittonic religion, generally identified with the Roman god Mars through the interpretatio romana. He is known chiefly from Latin votive inscriptions of the 1st to 3rd centuries AD, found in northern Gaul and the German provinces and as far afield as Britain and Dacia, and his cult was particularly associated with the Remi of the Reims region.

The same name is very widely attested as a personal name across the Celtic-speaking world, from Iberia to the Danube, which has prompted debate over its meaning and over whether some attestations name the god or serve as a secular personal name. The element also appears in place-names such as Camulodunum, the pre-Roman name of Colchester, and through it the name has been linked to the later Camelot.

== Name ==
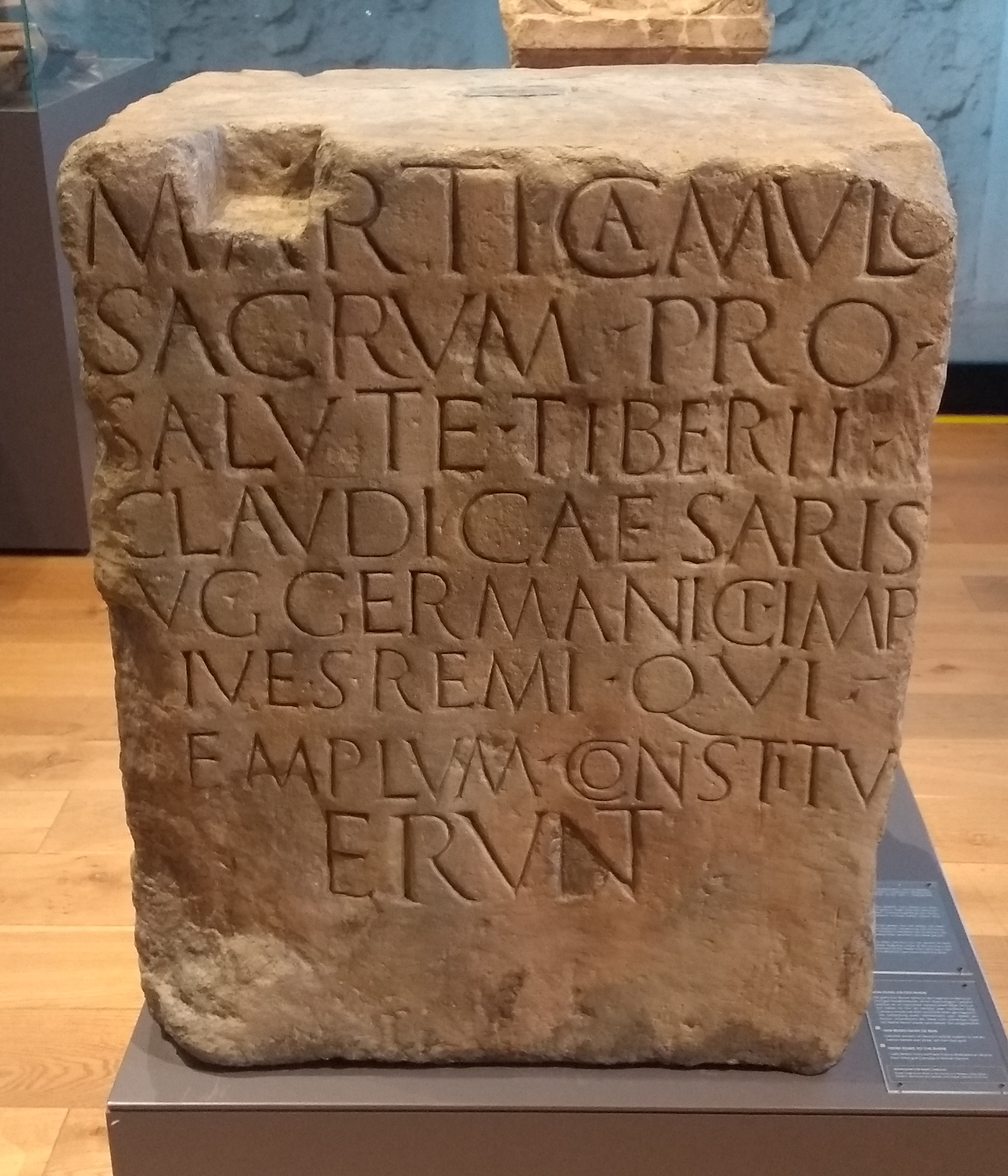
Altar dedicated to Mars Camulus (CIL XIII 8701).

The god's name appears in Latin as Camulus and, in the dative of the dedications, Camulo.

The etymology of the name is disputed. Xavier Delamarre glosses the element camulo- as 'champion' or 'servant', while stressing that the proposed etymologies are multiple, uncertain and contradictory. The comparison most often drawn is with the rare Old Irish word cumall ('champion'), whose sense suits the Gaulish name best. The related feminine cumal ('female slave, servant') comes from a root *kem(H)- ('to tire, take pains'), and Delamarre proposes for camulo- a general sense 'one who exerts himself', which would fit a champion as well as a servant. Bernhard Maier, for his part, treats the name as etymologically obscure.

The name is far more common as a personal name than as the name of a god. It occurs across the Celtic-speaking provinces, from Iberia to Pannonia and in Italy, as Camulus and Camula, and in a large family of derived and compound names such as Camulatus, Camulinus, Camulissius, Camulogenus and Camulognata. The compounds Camulorix and Camuloriga are themselves recorded as divine names. Julius Caesar names a Gaulish commander called Camulogenus, an Aulercan who led the Gauls against Caesar's legate Labienus in a battle on the Seine in 52 BC. The name Camulogenus ('descendant of the god Camulus') is generally read as evidence for the god. Bernhard Maier is sceptical: because Camulus is so widely used as an ordinary personal name, he judges it more likely that the name carried an appellative or honorific sense than that it points to a widely worshipped deity.

== Interpretation ==
In the inscriptions Camulus is regularly identified with Mars, and modern scholars group him among the Gaulish gods equated with the Roman war god. Andreas Hofeneder lists him, as the god of the Remi, among the principal such figures, alongside Segomo of the Sequani, Caturix of the Helvetii, Lenus of the Treveri, Mullo of the Cenomani and Redones, and Cicollus of the Lingones. His close association with the Remi, whose citizens built the temple at Rindern and set up the dedication at Rome, points to the role of a tribal protector.

Bernhard Maier places Camulus at the centre of a wider argument about Gaulish god-names. Many such names are also attested as personal names, which for Maier suggests that they were often understood as honorific epithets rather than as the names of individual deities. He treats Camulus, given how common it is as a personal name, as a leading example of such cases.

The Old Irish comparison with cumall has encouraged attempts to connect Camulus with Cumall, the father of the hero Finn. Luis García Moreno linked an Iberian group named by Diodorus Siculus, the Cemeleti, to the Hispanic name-element Camal-, taken by María Lourdes Albertos Firmat as a variant of Gaulish Camul-, and suggested that the Cemeleti were a people consecrated to Camulus, comparable to the Irish fíanna who followed Finn. Andreas Hofeneder rejects the proposal. He objects that Diodorus names a people called Kemeletoi rather than any form in Camul-, that the difference in vowel is left unexplained, and that the transmitted name is in any case doubtful.

== Epigraphy ==
Camulus is known almost entirely from Latin votive inscriptions. Most are altars set up in northern Gaul and the German provinces, in the region between the Seine and the Rhine, and the cult centres on Reims (Durocortorum), the capital of the Remi. On these dedications the god is regularly equated with Mars through the interpretatio romana. The one exception is a dedication from Rome, whose original text names Camulus on his own, in a list of gods, rather than as Mars Camulus.

Bernhard Maier and Andreas Hofeneder count six dedications to Mars Camulus, while the fuller survey by Simon Corcoran, Benet Salway and Peter Salway lists about ten, from Rome and Sarmizegetusa in Dacia to the Antonine Wall in Britain. Their list adds further dedications, including one from Worms (Borbetomagus), to the long-known group. Several of the dedicants are citizens of the Remi, among them the builders of the temple at Rindern and the soldier who set up the Roman altar.

Text	Find-spot	Divine name(s)	Translation	Reference	Comments
Marti Camulo / sacrum pro / salute ⟦Neronis⟧ Tiberii / Claudi Caesaris / Aug(usti) Germanici Imp(eratoris) / cives Remi qui / templum constituerunt	Rindern (Harenatium), Germania Inferior	Mars Camulus	Sacred to Mars Camulus. For the safety of the emperor Tiberius Claudius Caesar Augustus Germanicus, the citizens of the Remi, who built the temple, set this up.	CIL XIII, 8701	The earliest closely dated dedication. It was built by citizens of the Remi. The imperial name is re-cut: AE 1980, 656 reads an erased Neronis (Nero) replaced by Tiberii, dating the original dedication to about AD 66–68 and its alteration to after Nero's death, whereas the older CIL reading takes the text as a straightforward dedication to Claudius. The reverse carries an oak wreath with the formula ob cives servatos. Also published as ILS 235.
Marti / Camulo / sacrum / [...] // Fronto / T[...]oni f(ilius) / d(onum) d(edit)	Mainz (Mogontiacum), Germania Superior	Mars Camulus	Sacred to Mars Camulus ... Fronto, son of T[...], gave this gift.	CIL XIII, 11818	The stone is damaged and the dedicant's patronymic is incomplete. Dated to the 1st or 2nd century AD. Also published as AE 1910, 65.
[In] honor(em) [d(omus) d(ivinae)] [...] Martis Cam[uli ...] T(itus) Iucundiniu[s ... sac(erdos) Laur]entium Lavinat[ium ...]	Reims (Durocortorum), Gallia Belgica	Mars Camulus, with the imperial domus divina	In honour of the divine house ... of Mars Camulus ... Titus Iucundinius ..., priest of the Laurentes Lavinates ...	AE 1935, 64	A heavily restored honorific dedication at the capital of the Remi. The dedicant was a sacerdos Laurentium Lavinatium, a priesthood of Lavinium in Italy. Dated AD 171–250. Also published as ILTG 351 and AE 2016, 1062.
Marti / Camulo / Lellius / Settus / v(otum) [s(olvit)] / l(ibens) m(erito)	Arlon (Orolaunum), Gallia Belgica	Mars Camulus	To Mars Camulus, Lellius Settus discharged his vow willingly and deservedly.	CIL XIII, 3980	From the territory of the Treveri. Dated to the 2nd or 3rd century AD. Also published as ILS 4550.
Deo Marti Camulo / Verecundus Fructi / v(otum) s(olvit) l(ibens) m(erito)	Kruishoutem, Gallia Belgica	Mars Camulus	To the god Mars Camulus, Verecundus, son of Fructus, discharged his vow willingly and deservedly.	AE 1992, 1244	A bronze plaque from the territory of the Menapii. Also published as ILB 151.
Deo Mar(ti) / Camulo / [m]ilites coh(ortis) [I] / Hamioru[m] / [...]	Bar Hill (Antonine Wall), Britannia	Mars Camulus	To the god Mars Camulus, the soldiers of the First Cohort of Hamians set this up.	RIB 2166	Set up by the auxiliary cohors I Hamiorum, a unit of Syrian archers. Dated AD 142–161. The northernmost dedication to the god. Older reference CIL VII 1103.
Num(inibus) Aug(ustorum) / deo Marti Ca/mulo Tiberini/us Celerianus / c(ivis) Bell(ovacus) / moritix / Londiniensi/um / primus [...]	Southwark (Londinium), Britannia	Mars Camulus, with the numina of the emperors	To the divine spirits of the emperors and to the god Mars Camulus, Tiberinius Celerianus, a citizen of the Bellovaci, moritix of the Londoners, the first ...	RIB 3014	A marble plaque found at Tabard Square in 2002. Dated to the later 2nd century AD. The dedicant, a trader from the Bellovaci, calls himself moritix ('sea-trader'). Also published as AE 2002, 882.
Invicto / Mithrae / Marti Camulo / Mercurio / Rosmertae / Q(uintus) Axius Aeli/anus v(ir) e(gregius) / proc(urator) Aug(ustorum) / [...]	Sarmizegetusa, Dacia	Mars Camulus, with Mithras, Mercury and Rosmerta	To the unconquered Mithras, to Mars Camulus, to Mercury and to Rosmerta, Quintus Axius Aelianus, of equestrian rank, procurator of the emperors, ...	AE 1998, 1100	The dedicant was the equestrian procurator Quintus Axius Aelianus. Dated AD 235–238. Also published as ILD 277.
⟦Arduinnae⟧ ⟦Camulo⟧ Saturno Marti Iovi Mercurio Herculi / M(arcus) Quartinius M(arci) f(ilius) civis Sabinus Remus / miles coh(ortis) VII pr(aetoriae) Antoninianae P(iae) V(indicis) v(otum) l(ibens) s(olvit)	Rome, Italia	Camulus, with Arduinna; both later erased and replaced by Saturn and Mars	To Saturn and Mars, to Jupiter, Mercury and Hercules, cut over erased dedications to Arduinna and Camulus. Marcus Quartinius, son of Marcus, a citizen of the Remi, soldier of the Seventh Praetorian Cohort Antoniniana Pia Vindex, willingly discharged his vow.	CIL VI, 46	The only dedication in which Camulus is not joined to Mars, and the basis for Maier's statement to that effect. The two Celtic theonyms, Arduinna and Camulus, were later erased and Saturno Marti cut into the space. The dedicant was a praetorian. Dated AD 211–222. Also published as ILS 4633 and AE 1992, 76.

== Place-names and coinage ==
The name Camulus underlies several ancient place-names. The best known is Camulodunum, 'the fort of Camulus', the pre-Roman name of the great oppidum at modern Colchester, the chief seat of the Trinovantes and, from about AD 5, the capital of Cunobelinus of the Catuvellauni. A second Camulodunum lay in the territory of the Brigantes in northern Britain, where Ptolemy places it, and it has been identified with the Roman fort at Slack in Yorkshire. The same element appears in the British name Camulosessa and in several place-names on the Continent.

Camulodunum was the chief mint of Cunobelinus, and the abbreviated place-name appears on his coinage as CAM, CAMV, CAMVL and CAMVLODVN.

The name Camulodunum has been proposed as the ultimate source of Camelot, the seat of King Arthur in medieval romance, which is first attested in the late 12th century in the Lancelot of Chrétien de Troyes.
