= Château Fort Saint-Georges =

Castle in Bourgogne-Franche-Comté, France

Coordinates: 47°19′38″N 4°47′18″E

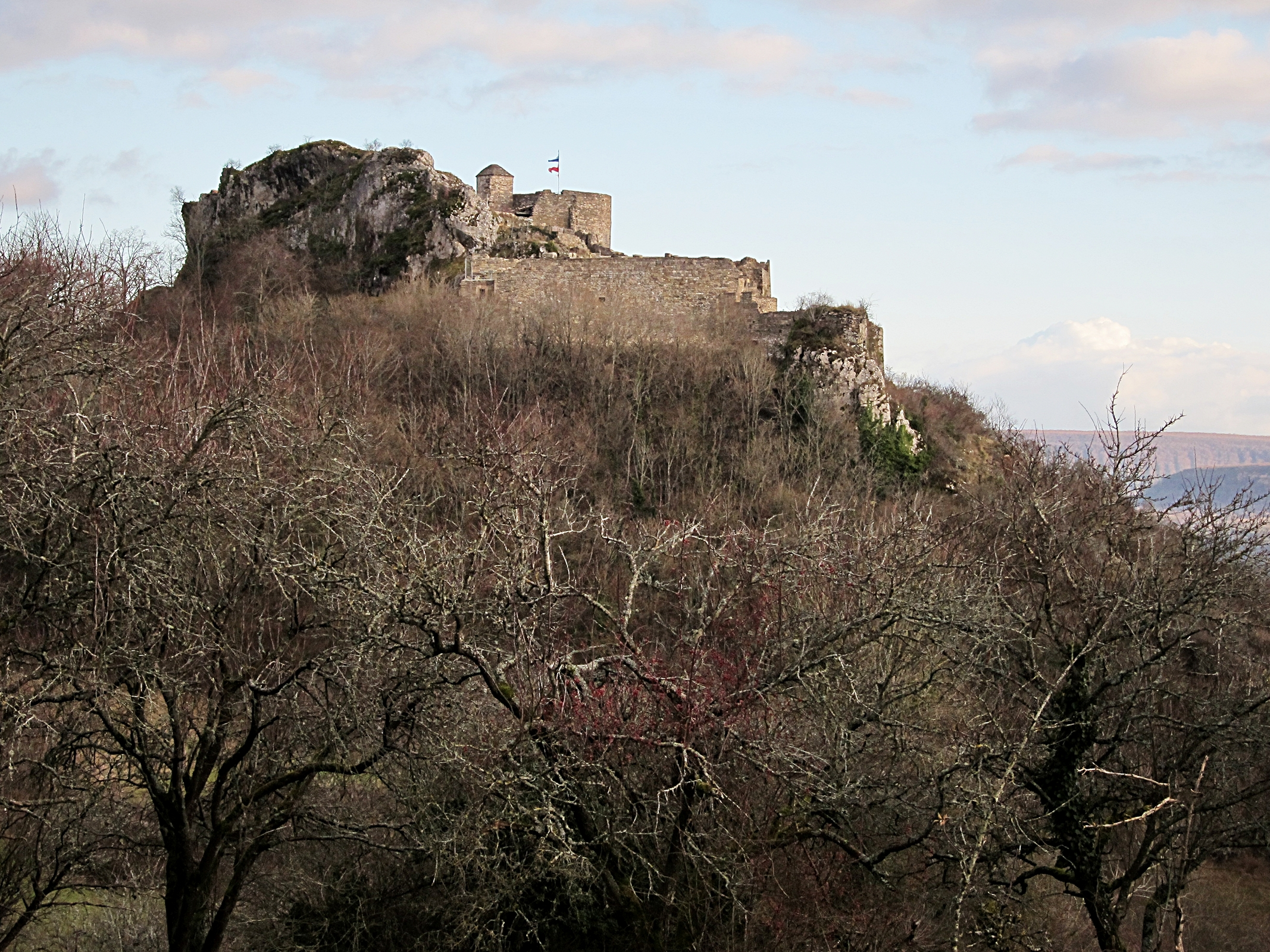
Château Fort Saint-Georges

The Château Fort Saint-Georges (or Château Fort de Mâlain) is a ruined castle in the commune of Mâlain in the Côte-d'Or département of France.

The castle's origins are from the 11th century, with major additions or alterations in the 14th, 15th and 16th centuries. In 1390, the Saint-Georges chapel was built for Pierre de Montaigu. The dovecote and annexes have been remodelled, certain parts of which date from the 15th and 16th centuries. At the end of the 18th century, the castle was already partially in ruins; the only remains are a part of the curtain wall, and remains of the keep and a corps de logis.

The castle was shared between two inheritors in the 15th century. It has been undergoing restoration by volunteers since 1985. Today, it belongs to the Mairie of Mâlain and the Groupe Archéologique du Mesmontois.

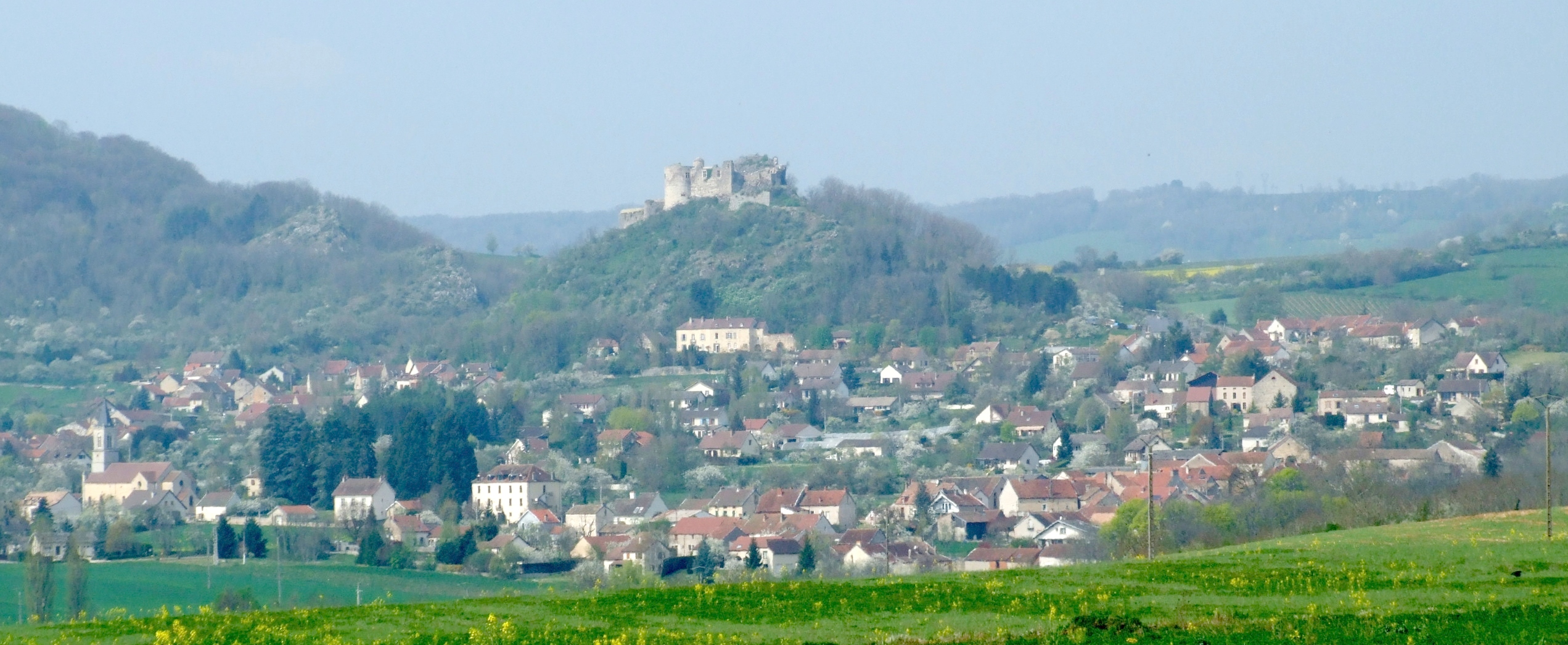
Panoramic view of Mâlain

== See also ==
- List of castles in France
