= Aignay-le-Duc =

- Commune
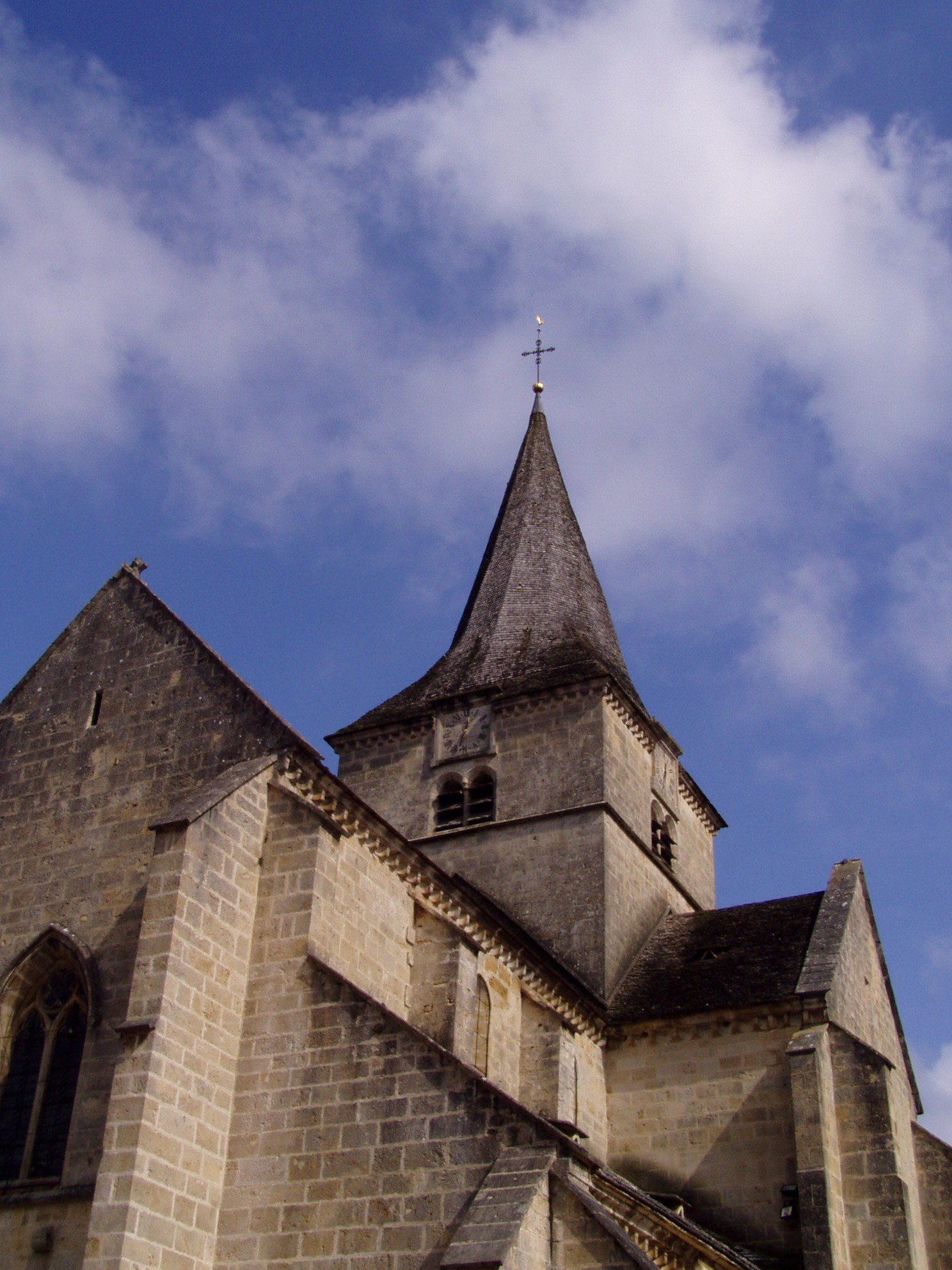
- The bell tower of the church in Aignay-le-Duc

- Coat of arms
- Location of Aignay-le-Duc
- Location within France Location within Bourgogne-Franche-Comté
- Coordinates: 47°39′59″N 4°44′08″E
- Country: France
- Region: Bourgogne-Franche-Comté
- Department: Côte-d'Or
- Arrondissement: Montbard
- Canton: Châtillon-sur-Seine
- Intercommunality: Pays Châtillonnais

Government
  - Mayor (2023–2026): Gilbert Changarnier
- Area^{1}: 24.86 km^{2} (9.60 sq mi)
- Elevation: 330 m (1,080 ft)
- Highest elevation: 443 m (1,453 ft)
- Lowest elevation: 310 m (1,020 ft)
- Population (2023): 257
  - Density: 10.3/km^{2} (26.8/sq mi)
- Time zone: UTC+01:00 (CET)
  - Summer (DST): UTC+02:00 (CEST)
- INSEE/Postal code: 21004 /21510
- ^{1} French Land Register data, which excludes lakes, ponds, glaciers > 1 km^{2} (0.386 sq mi or 247 acres) and river estuaries.

Aignay-le-Duc (French pronunciation: [ɛɲɛ lə dyk]) is a commune in the eastern French department of Côte-d'Or.

== Geography ==
The commune of Aignay-le-Duc is located some 30 km south-east of Châtillon-sur-Seine and some 30 km east of Montbard in a direct line. Access to the commune is by Highway D901 which enters on the north-west border, continues to the village and exits the south-east border. There is also Highway D101 linking the village to Étalante to the south-east. Highway D954 links the village through the eastern border to Saint-Broing-les-Moines. There is also Highway D112 which exits the commune in the north-east. There are extensive forests in the eastern part of the commune (Bois de Fort Fais, Bois du Bas des Soulers etc.) with about two thirds of the commune farmland. There are no villages other than Aignay-le-Duc.

The Coquille stream flows through the town and forming the eastern border is the Brevon stream. The Coquille flows to the Revinson stream which joins the Seine river. The Brevon flows north and eventually joins the Seine near Brémur-et-Vaurois.

== History ==
Aignay-le-Duc belonged to the territory of Lingons and had a Celtic population. Its name may come from the Celtic: Ann-iacum meaning "The location of the water source" ann- is a well known root name for rivers [e.g. l'Ain, Inn (Austria), Anio (Italy)]. The village is close to the source of the Coquille.

A yellow limestone used in the cemetery, dating from the late second century or early third century AD, is inscribed: Aug (ustis) sac (rum) deo Marti Cicolluis et Litavi P. Attius Paterc[l]u[s] [v(otum) s(olvit) l(ibens) m(erito)] which means: "To the august sacred deities, to the god Mars Cicolluis and Litavi, P. Attius Paterculus paid his vow willingly and deservedly".

An inscription was found on a bronze vase near Aignay in 1896 which, according to Chassenay, said: Aug(usto) sacr(um) deo Albio et Damonae Sext(us) Mart(ius) Cociliani f(ilius) ex jussu ejus [v(otum)] s(olvit) l(ibens) m(erito) meaning "It is sacred to Augustus, to the gods Albius and Damona, Sextus Martius, son of Cocilianus, in order to fulfill his vow.

During the revolutionary period of the National Convention (1792-1795), the town took the name of Aignay-Côte-d'Or abbreviated to Aignay.

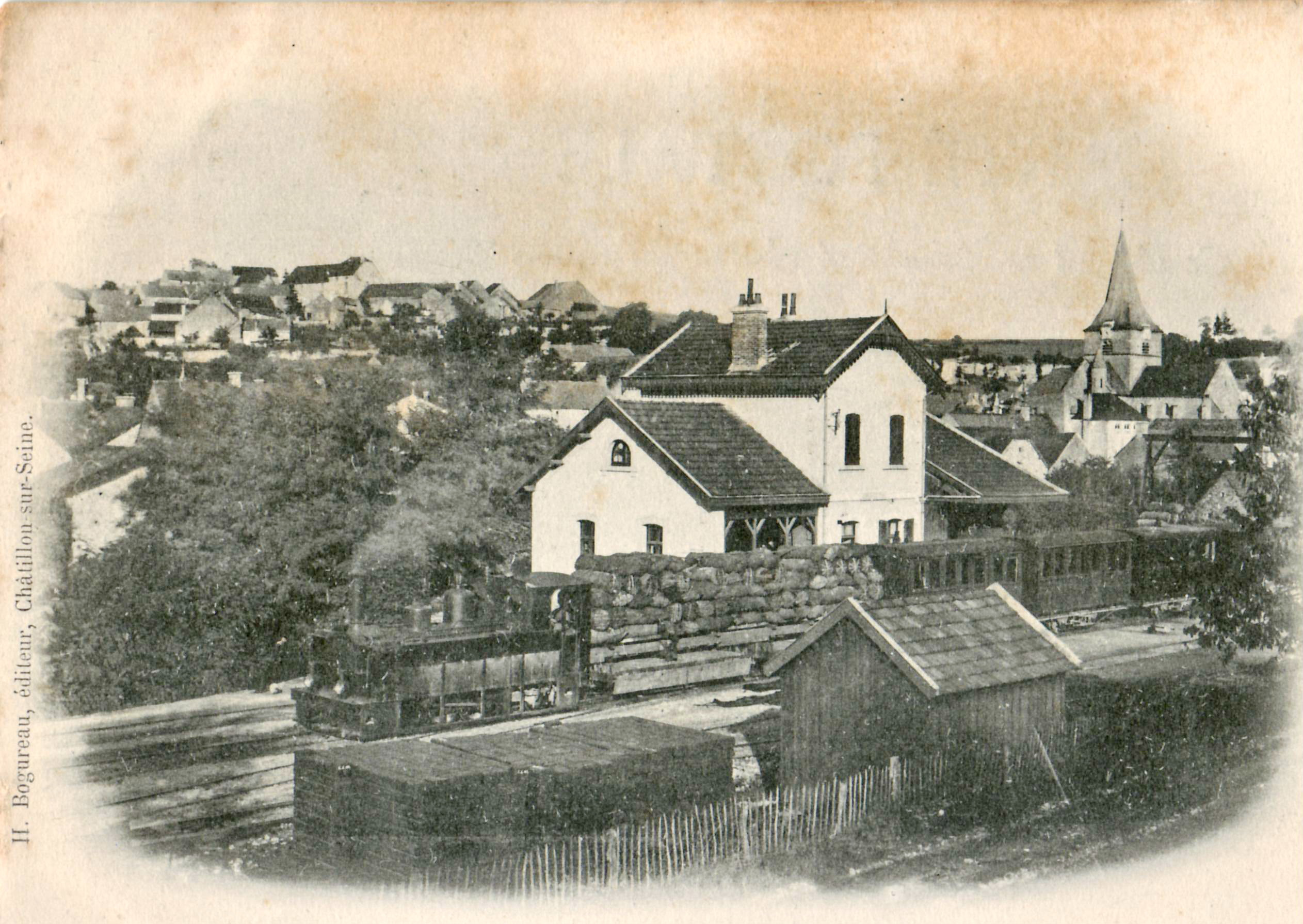
The village was served by a line of metre gauge light railway by the Railways Department of Côte-d'Or which linked Dijon-Porte-Neuve-Chatillon-sur-Seine from 1891 to 1948. Here is seen the station.

== Heraldry ==
Arms of Aignay-le-Duc	Blazon: Gules, six billets argent set 3, 2, 1.

== Administration ==
List of Successive Mayors of Aignay-le-Duc

From	To	Name	Party
1989	2008	Bernard Bonnuit	DVD
2008	2009	Alexandre Misset	SE
2014	2023	Frédéric Bourdenet	
2023	2026	Gilbert Changarnier	

== Population ==
The inhabitants of the commune are known as Aignacois or Aignacoises in French.

Historical population

Year	Pop.	±% p.a.
1793	766	—
1821	898	+0.57%
1846	880	−0.08%
1872	804	−0.35%
1901	765	−0.17%
1926	673	−0.51%
1946	629	−0.34%
1962	572	−0.59%
1968	630	+1.62%

Year	Pop.	±% p.a.
1975	534	−2.33%
1982	528	−0.16%
1990	455	−1.84%
1999	402	−1.37%
2007	365	−1.20%
2012	309	−3.28%
2017	282	−1.81%
2023	257	−1.54%

Source: EHESS and INSEE

== Culture and heritage ==
=== Civil heritage ===
The commune has a large number of Houses that are registered as historical monuments.

The commune also has many other buildings and structures that are registered as historical monuments:

- A Lavoir (Public laundry) at Rue de la Demoiselle (19th century)
- A Fountain at Rue de la Planchotte (18th century)
- A Barn at Rue de l'Ile (1790)
- A Bridge at Rue de l'Ile (19th century)
- The Lavoir de la Margelle (Public laundry) at Rue de la Margelle (18th century)
- A Railway worker refuge at RN 454 (19th century)
- A Lavoir (Public laundry) at Rue des Vieilles Halles (19th century)
- A Farmhouse at Grand Bois (17th century)
- The Pierre-Fiche Menhir (Prehistoric)
- A Commemorative Monument at Combe des Carrés (1839)
- The Covered Market (18th century)
- The Town Hall / School (1789)
- The Urban Area Fortification (15th century)

Other sites of interest

- Celtic Tumuli have been found including several burials from different periods, the most recent dating to the 5th century AD.

=== Religious heritage ===
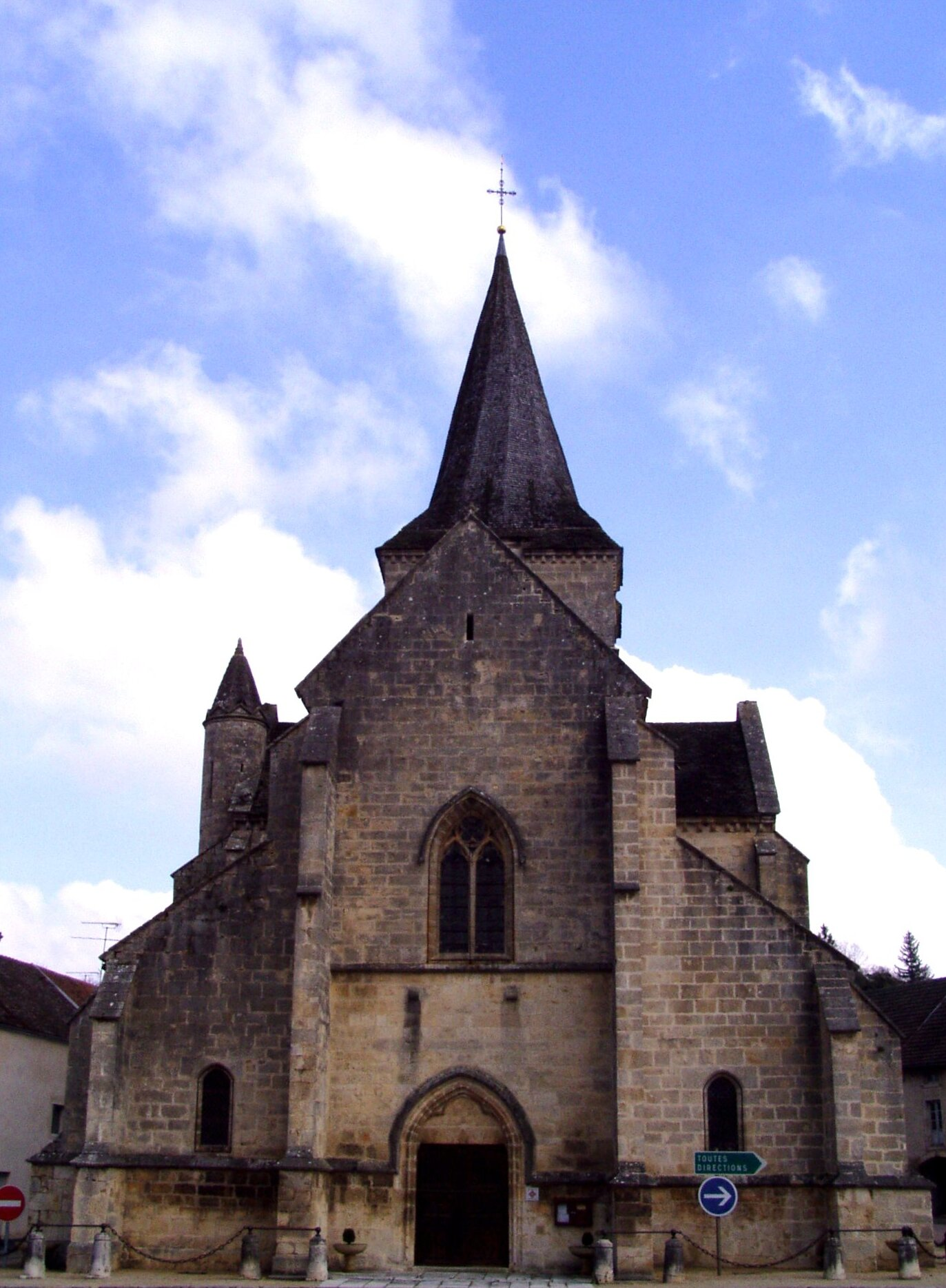
Church of Saint Peter and Saint Paul

The commune has several religious buildings and structures that are registered as historical monuments:

- A Wayside Cross at Chemin de Beaunotte (1831)
- A Wayside Cross at Chevigny Farm (17th century)
- A Wayside Cross at Rue des Granges (1674)
- The Croix Lannier Wayside Cross north of the village (1662)
- The Croix Mignard Wayside Cross north-east of the village (17th century)
- A Presbytery (19th century). The Presbytery contains several items that are registered as historical objects:
  - The Furniture in the Presbytery
  - A Processional Staff (18th century)
  - A Statue: Virgin and child (2) (19th century)
  - A Statue: Virgin and child (1) (17th century)
  - A Statue: Saint Eloi (17th century)
- A Wayside Cross at Grand Bois (16th century)
- A Monumental Cross at Saint-Michel (1637)
- A Tomb (19th century)
- A Cemetery Cross (1637)
- The Cemetery Portal (19th century)
- The Church of Saint Peter and Saint Paul (1170). The Church contains a very large number of items which are registered as historical objects.
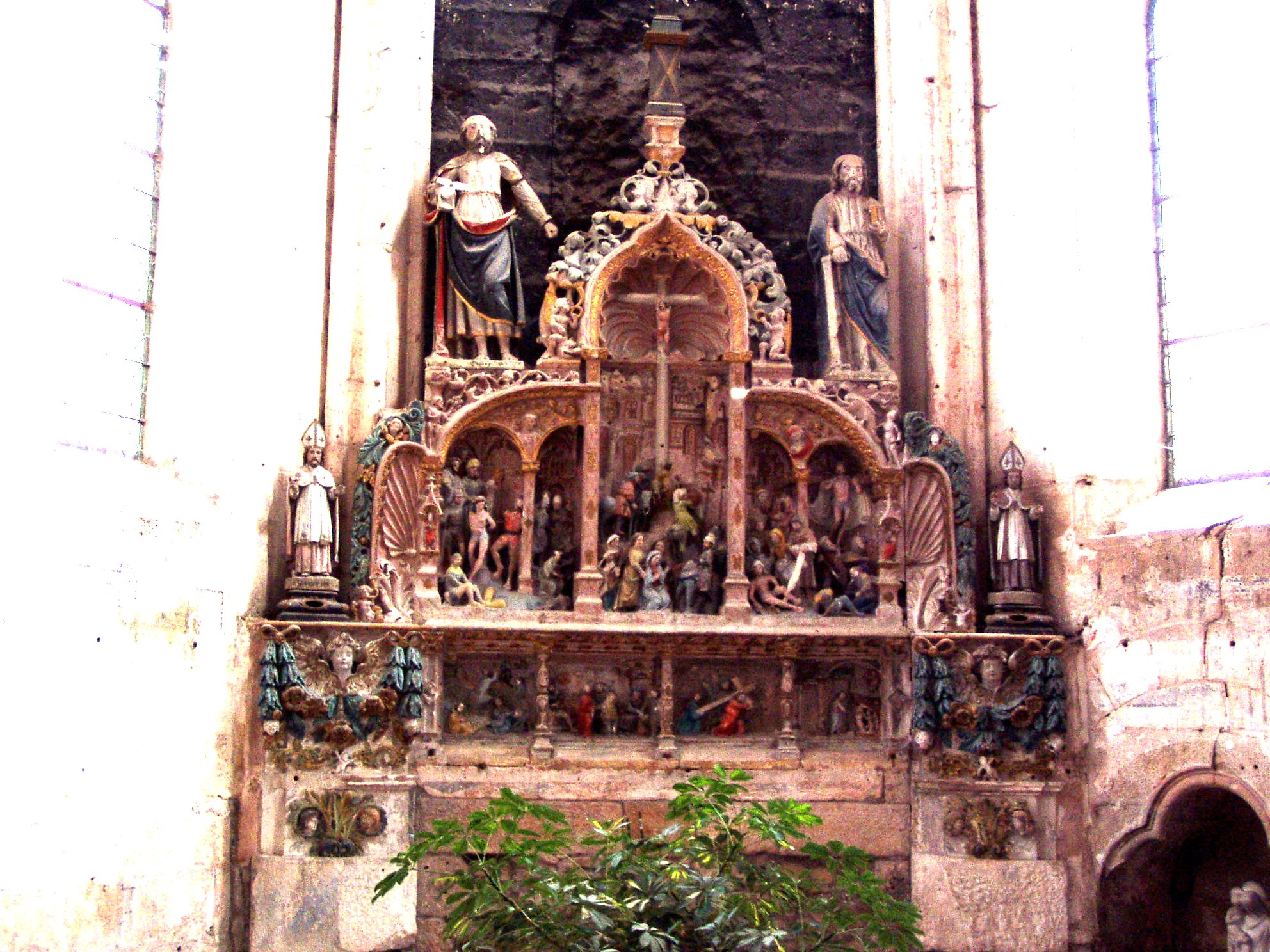
The Renaissance altarpiece

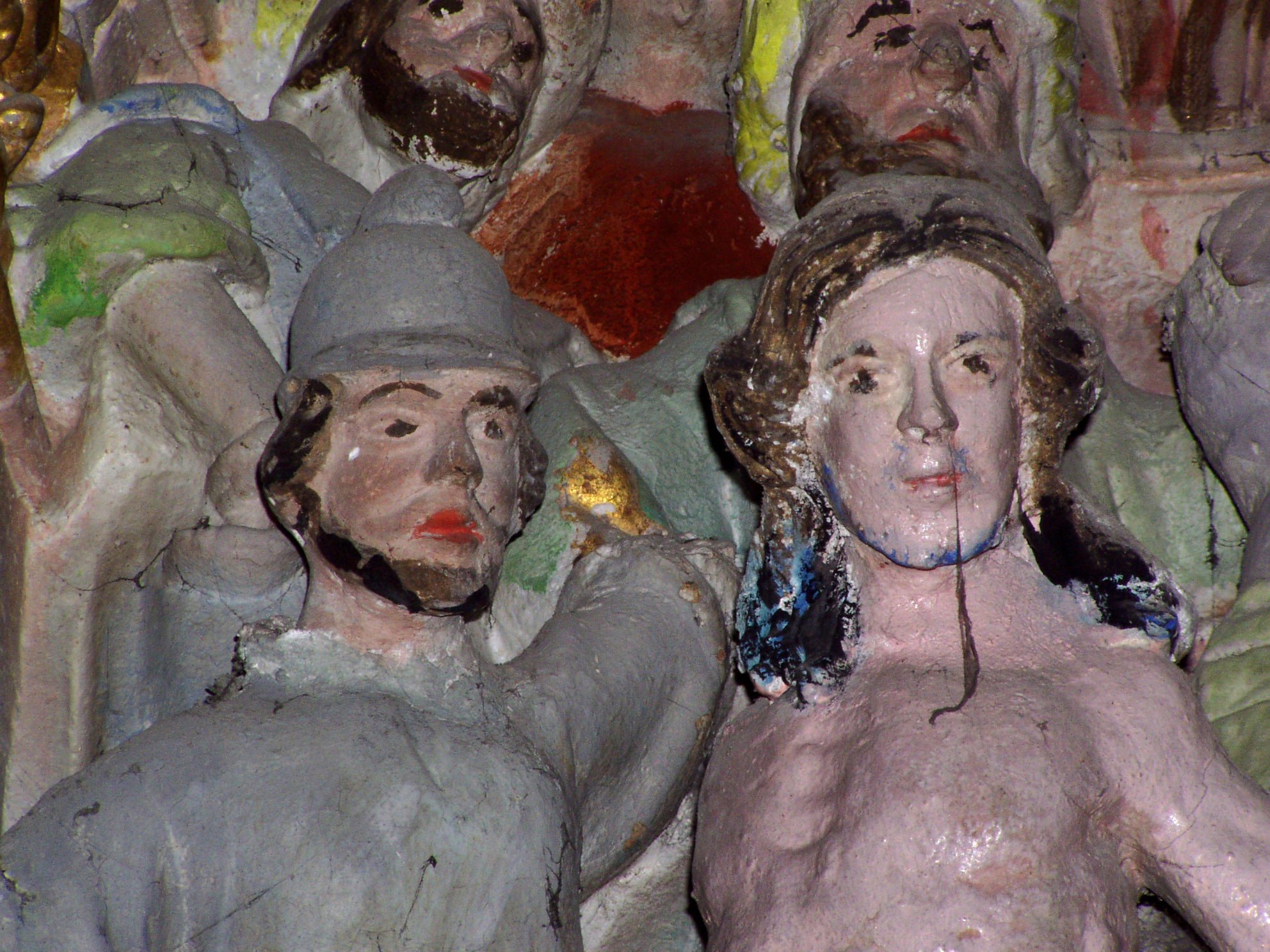
Detail of the altarpiece

== Notable people ==
- Claude-Auguste Petit de Beauverger (born Aignay-le-Duc, 7 October 1748 - died Paris, 6 September 1819)

== See also ==
- Communes of the Côte-d'Or department
