= Anextlomarus =

Ancient Celtic deity

Anextlomarus or Anextiomarus (Gaulish: Anextlomāros, 'Great Protector') is an ancient Celtic deity. On an inscription from Arbeia (modern South Shields, England), he appears as epithet of the Roman god Apollo. A feminine form of the name, Anextlomara, is attested in a Gallo-Roman dedication from Aventicum (now Avenches, Switzerland). He probably also appears in incomplete form in a fragmentary dedication found near Le Mans, France.

== Name ==
Bronze patera dedicated to Apollo Anextiomarus, found at Herd Sand, South Shields.

The Gaulish theonym Anextlomāros has been interpreted as 'great protector', 'of great protection', or '(he who is) great in protection'. It is a compound formed with the noun anextlo- ('protection'; cf. Old Irish anacul '[act of] protecting) attached to māros ('great'). The feminine form Anextlomarā, attested in Aventicum (modern Avenches), is translated as 'Great Protectress'.

Anextlomarus is also attested as a personal name at Langres.

== Epigraphy ==
Anextlomarus is equated with Apollo and is attested by a small group of Latin dedications in Roman Britain and Gaul, alongside a feminine counterpart, Anextlomara. The name is also borne by private individuals, as on one funerary inscription, which is not a dedication to the god. The single British attestation, a bronze patera from Arbeia (South Shields), spells the divine name Anextiomarus, its fourteenth letter read as I. The Gaulish texts and the feminine Anextlomara show Anextlo- instead, and the British spelling is usually taken as a variant or an error for it.

The dedication from Aventicum (Avenches), of the 1st to 3rd centuries AD, is addressed jointly to Anextlomara and to the reigning emperor. The dedicant's nomen, Publicius, marks him as a freed public slave serving Roman municipalities and colonies, and his Celtic cognomen, Aunus, points to an indigenous origin. Augustus is to be understood here as the generic title of the reigning emperor. Regula Frei-Stolba and Anne Bielman read the joint dedication as an attempt to attach the imperial cult to a local one, and note that the divine name is cut with an oversized X in the form of the Greek chi, a feature they connect with pre-conquest Gaulish epigraphy.

| Text | Find-spot | Divine name(s) | Translation | Reference | Comments |
|---|---|---|---|---|---|
| Apollini Anextiomaro M(arcus) A(...) Sab(inus?) | South Shields | Apollo Anextiomarus | To Apollo Anextiomarus, Marcus A(...) Sabinus (?) (dedicated this). | RIB II.2, 2415.55 | On a bronze patera, found on the Herd Sand in 1887. The name is spelt Anextio-, against the Gaulish Anextlo-, and some scholars propose to amended to emend it to Anextlomarus. Also published as ILS 4636. |
| [Apollin]i(?) Anex[tlomaro(?)] [...] sac(erdos) eius dei [aedem cum suis ornam]entis d(edit) | Le Mans | Apollo Anextlomarus (?) | To Apollo(?) Anextlomarus(?): [the dedicant], priest of that god, gave [a temple] with its fittings. | CIL XIII, 3190 | Heavily restored. Both divine names are conjectural. From the territory of the Aulerci Cenomani. |
| Anextlomarae et Aug(usto) Public(ius) Aunus [...] | Avenches | Anextlomara | To Anextlomara and to the Emperor, Publicius Aunus (set this up). | Finke 94 | The feminine form Anextlomara paired with the reigning emperor. Also AE 1916, 2; IAvenches 25. |
