= Patrice Lajoye =

French comparative mythologist

- Born: 26 July 1974 (age 52); Lisieux, Normandie

Academic background
- Education: Faculté ouverte des Religions et Humanismes Laïques (Charleroi)

Academic work
- Discipline: Religious studies, Literary studies
- Sub-discipline: Comparative mythology, Celtic and Slavic paganism, Russian fantasy and science-fiction literature
- Institutions: University of Caen; CNRS

Patrice Lajoye (born 26 July 1974) is a French religious studies scholar and comparative mythologist who specializes on the study of Celtic and Slavic paganism. The co-founder of the journal Nouvelle Mythologie comparée, he currently works for the CNRS at the Maison de la Recherche en Sciences Humaines of the University of Caen, and has served as the sub-editor of Histoire et Sociétés Rurales. Lajoye has also written studies on Russian fantasy and science-fiction literature, as well as translations, anthologies, and novels.

== Career ==
Born on 26 July 1974 in Lisieux, Normandie, Patrice Lajoye first worked as a volunteer on archaeological sites in northwestern France in the 1990s. He earned a Master in geography from the University of Caen in 1998, then a PhD in comparative mythology summa cum laude from the Faculté ouverte des Religions et Humanismes laïques de Charleroi (Belgium) in 2008, under the direction of Celtic scholar Claude Sterckx. He was the director of the journal Mythologie Française from 2003 to 2007. Between 2008 and 2010, he worked as an Associate Researcher at INRAP, studying the funerary rites of the Gallo-Roman Évreux necropolis. He also served as the sub-editor of the journal Gallia. Lajoye is a member of the Société historique de Lisieux.

His 2017 work Étoiles rouges: la littérature de science-fiction soviétique, co-written with his wife Viktoriya Lajoye, was awarded the Grand prix de l'Imaginaire for the best essay in 2018.

== Works ==
- Des dieux gaulois: petits essais de mythologie. Archaeolingua. 2008. ISBN 978-963-8046-92-5.
- Perun, dieu slave de l'orage: Archéologie, histoire, folklore. Lingva. 2015. ISBN 979-1094441251.
- L'arbre du monde : la cosmologie celte. CNRS Éditions. 2016. ISBN 978-2-271-08904-5.
- Étoiles rouges : la littérature de science-fiction soviétique. Piranha. 2017. ISBN 978-2-37119-074-0.
- New Researches on the Religion and Mythology of the Pagan Slavs. Lingva. 2019. ISBN 979-10-94441-46-6. (with Jirí Dynda and Alexander Ivanenko)
- La Grande anthologie du fantastique russe et ukrainien. Lingva. 2020. ISBN 979-10-94441-48-0.
- Mythologie et religion des Slaves païens. Les Belles Lettres. 2022. ISBN 978-2251453-12-5.
