= Dammartin-Marpain =

Commune in Bourgogne-Franche-Comté, France

- Commune
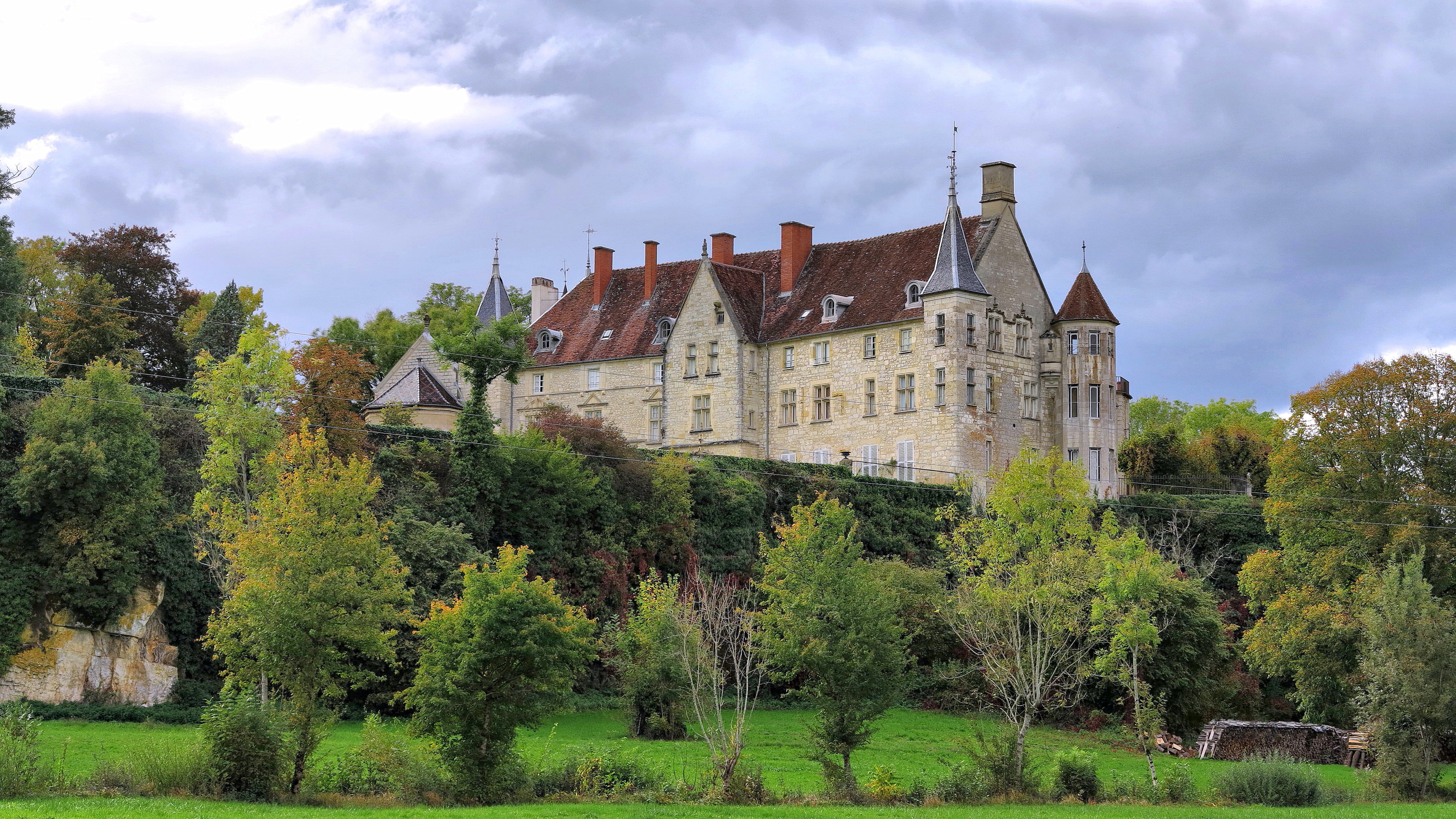
- The chateau of Montrambert in Dammartin-Marpain
- Location of Dammartin-Marpain
- Location within France Location within Bourgogne-Franche-Comté
- Coordinates: 47°15′27″N 5°32′43″E
- Country: France
- Region: Bourgogne-Franche-Comté
- Department: Jura
- Arrondissement: Dole
- Canton: Authume

Government
  - Mayor (2020–2026): Antony Bourcet
- Area^{1}: 11.32 km^{2} (4.37 sq mi)
- Highest elevation: 241 m (791 ft)
- Lowest elevation: 191 m (627 ft)
- Population (2023): 340
  - Density: 30/km^{2} (78/sq mi)
- Time zone: UTC+01:00 (CET)
  - Summer (DST): UTC+02:00 (CEST)
- INSEE/Postal code: 39188 /39290
- ^{1} French Land Register data, which excludes lakes, ponds, glaciers > 1 km^{2} (0.386 sq mi or 247 acres) and river estuaries.

Dammartin-Marpain (French pronunciation: [damaʁtɛ̃ maʁpɛ̃]) is a commune in the Jura department in Bourgogne-Franche-Comté in eastern France. It was created in 1973 by the merger of two former communes: Marpain and Dammartin.

== Population ==
Historical population
Year	Pop.	±% p.a.
1968	216	—
1975	193	−1.60%
1982	189	−0.30%
1990	175	−0.96%
1999	227	+2.93%
2007	246	+1.01%
2012	311	+4.80%
2017	342	+1.92%
2023	340	−0.10%
Source: INSEE

== See also ==
- Communes of the Jura department
