= Brémur-et-Vaurois =

- Commune
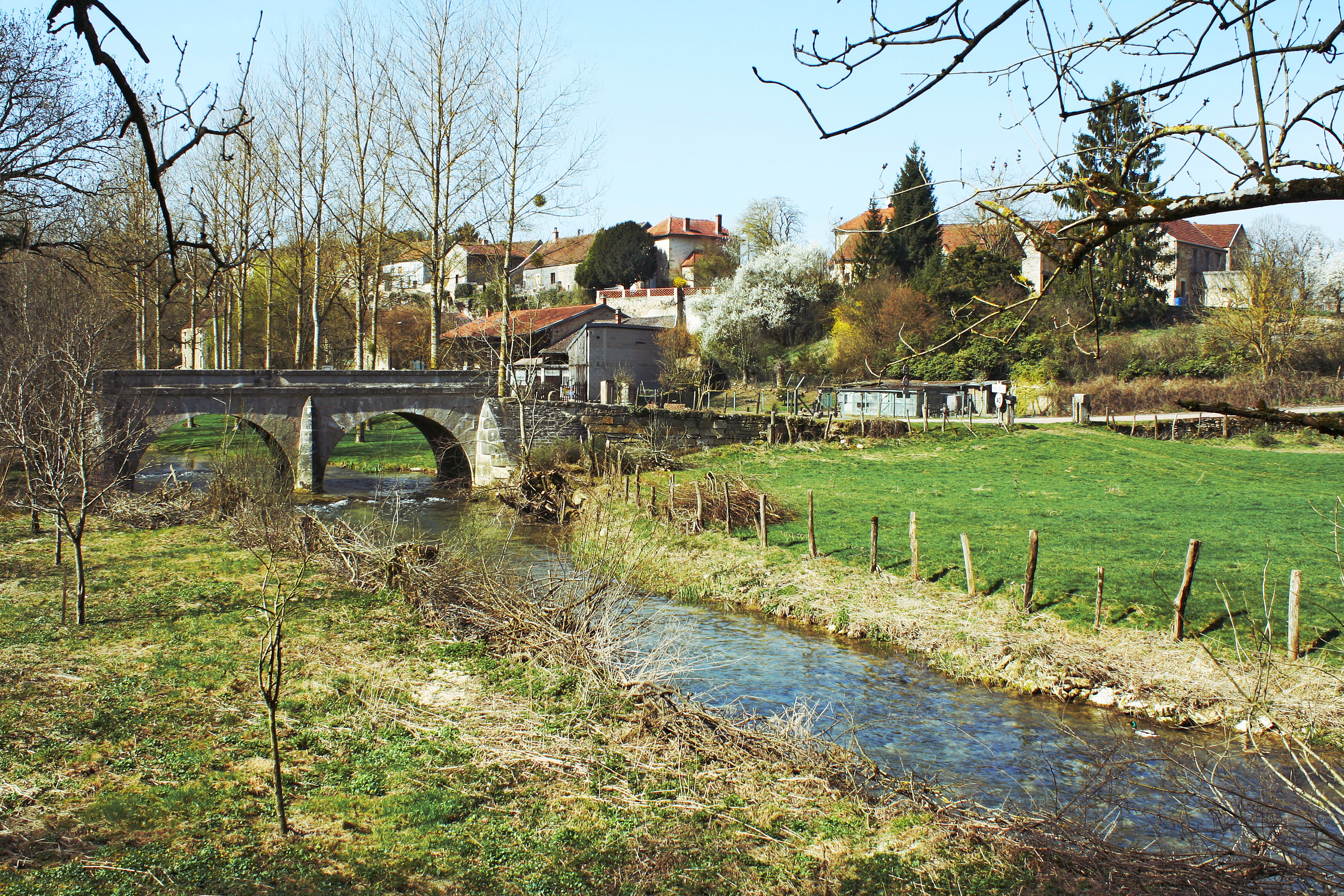
- The bridge over the River Seine in Brémur-et-Vaurois

- Coat of arms
- Location of Brémur-et-Vaurois
- Location within France Location within Bourgogne-Franche-Comté
- Coordinates: 47°44′03″N 4°36′19″E
- Country: France
- Region: Bourgogne-Franche-Comté
- Department: Côte-d'Or
- Arrondissement: Montbard
- Canton: Châtillon-sur-Seine
- Intercommunality: Pays Châtillonnais

Government
  - Mayor (2020–2026): Gérard Malnoury
- Area^{1}: 9.31 km^{2} (3.59 sq mi)
- Elevation: 385 m (1,263 ft)
- Highest elevation: 388 m (1,273 ft)
- Lowest elevation: 255 m (837 ft)
- Population (2023): 45
  - Density: 4.8/km^{2} (13/sq mi)
- Time zone: UTC+01:00 (CET)
  - Summer (DST): UTC+02:00 (CEST)
- INSEE/Postal code: 21104 /21400
- ^{1} French Land Register data, which excludes lakes, ponds, glaciers > 1 km^{2} (0.386 sq mi or 247 acres) and river estuaries.

Brémur-et-Vaurois (French pronunciation: [bʁemyʁ e voʁwa]) is a commune in the Côte-d'Or department in eastern France.

== Population ==
Historical population
Year	Pop.	±% p.a.
1968	124	—
1975	106	−2.22%
1982	115	+1.17%
1990	91	−2.88%
1999	78	−1.70%
2007	52	−4.94%
2012	66	+4.88%
2017	49	−5.78%
2023	45	−1.41%
Source: INSEE

== See also ==
- Communes of the Côte-d'Or department
