= Rindern =

Village in North Rhine-Westphalia, Germany

- Stadtteil of Kleve
- Interactive map of Rindern
- Location within Germany Location within North Rhine-Westphalia
- Coordinates: 51°48′40″N 6°7′21″E
- Country: Germany
- State: North Rhine-Westphalia
- District: Kleve
- Town: Kleve

Area
  - Total: 6.73 km^{2} (2.60 sq mi)

Population (2012-12-31)
  - Total: 2,840
  - Density: 422/km^{2} (1,090/sq mi)
- Time zone: UTC+01:00 (CET)
  - Summer (DST): UTC+02:00 (CEST)
- Postal codes: 47533

Rindern is a village in the Kleve (district) of Lower Rhine region of Germany. It is part of the town Kleve.

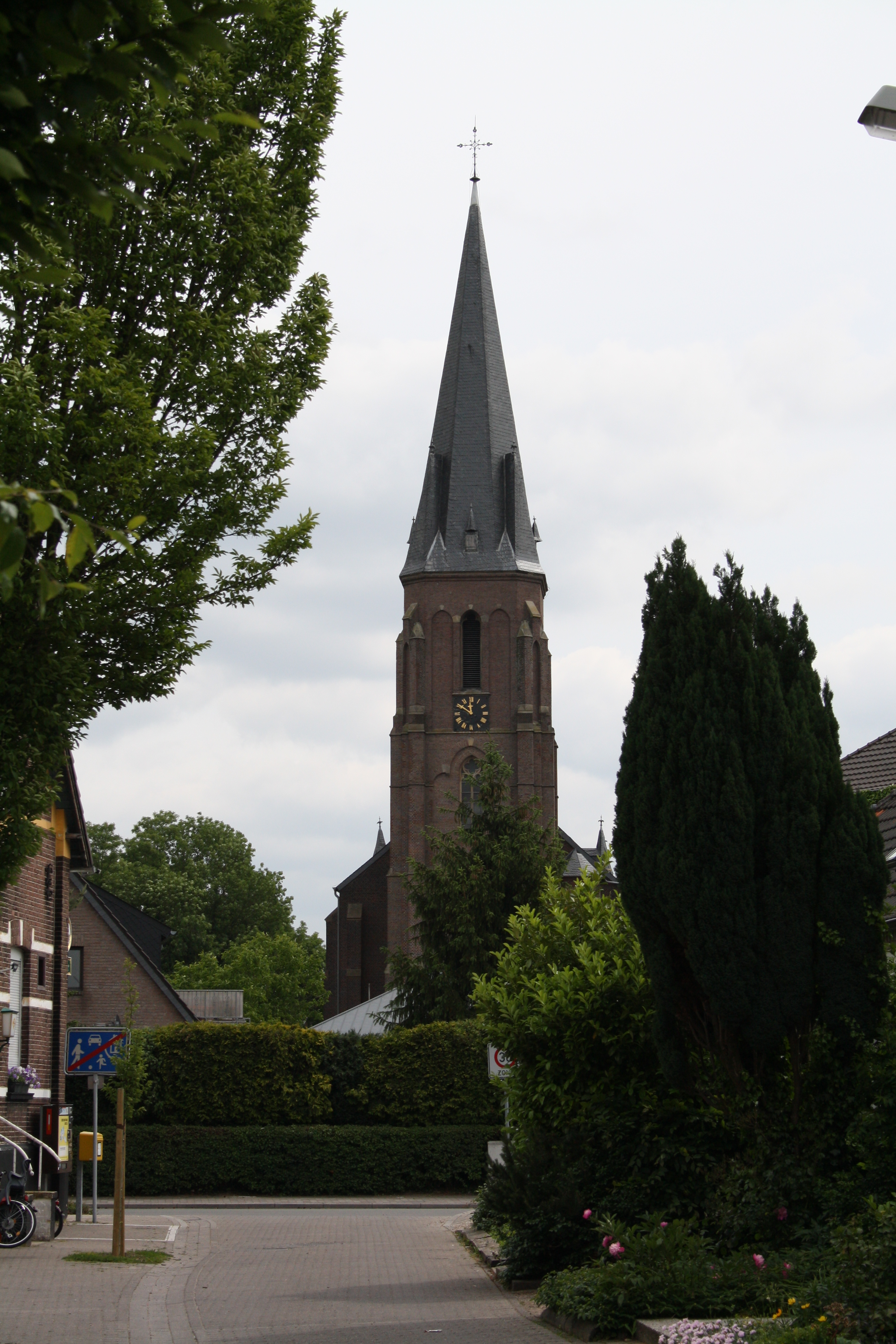
St. Willibrord's church

== History ==
The town is mentioned, by the name Rinharos, in the 8th century, when Count Ebroin, son of Oda, made a donation to its church.
