= Mâlain =

- Commune
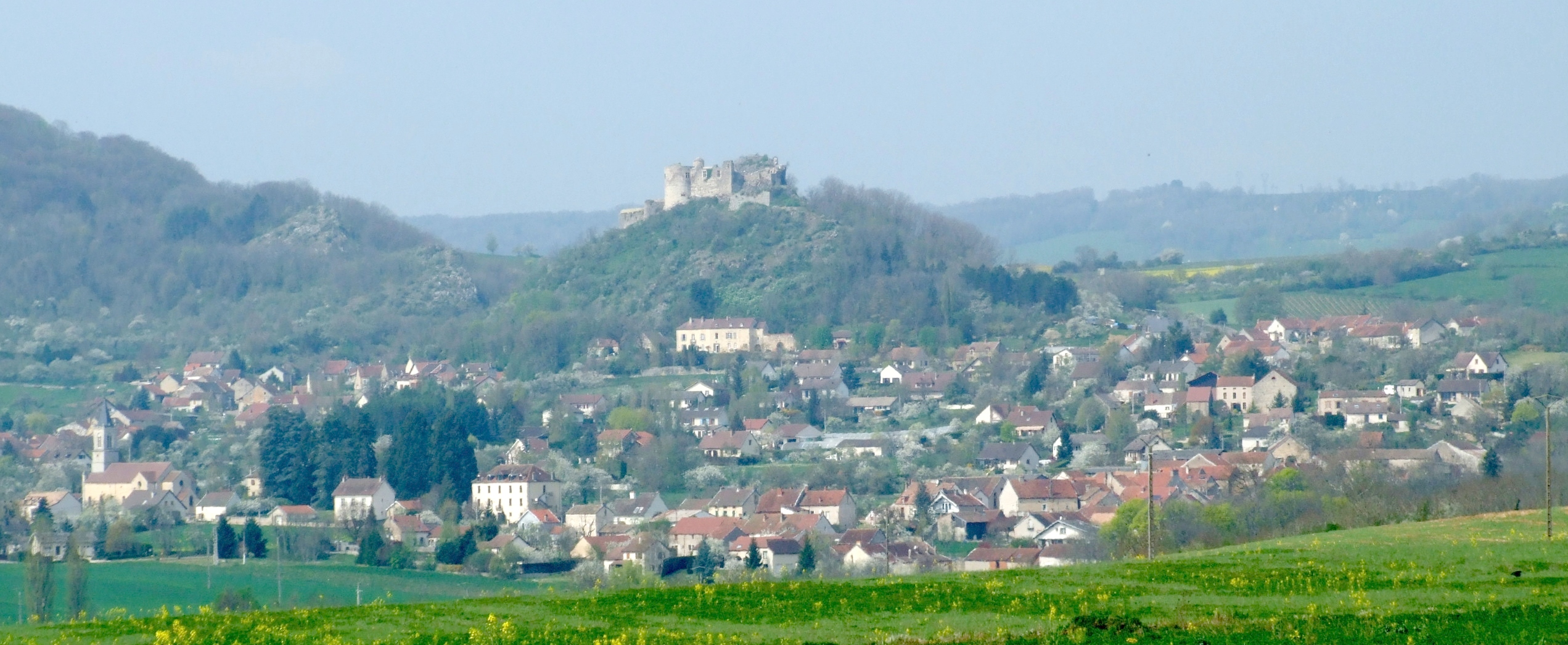
- A general view of Mâlain

- Coat of arms
- Location of Mâlain
- Location within France Location within Bourgogne-Franche-Comté
- Coordinates: 47°19′36″N 4°47′44″E
- Country: France
- Region: Bourgogne-Franche-Comté
- Department: Côte-d'Or
- Arrondissement: Dijon
- Canton: Talant

Government
  - Mayor (2020–2026): Nicolas Beneton
- Area^{1}: 11.24 km^{2} (4.34 sq mi)
- Highest elevation: 535 m (1,755 ft)
- Lowest elevation: 280 m (920 ft)
- Population (2023): 798
  - Density: 71.0/km^{2} (184/sq mi)
- Time zone: UTC+01:00 (CET)
  - Summer (DST): UTC+02:00 (CEST)
- INSEE/Postal code: 21373 /21410
- ^{1} French Land Register data, which excludes lakes, ponds, glaciers > 1 km^{2} (0.386 sq mi or 247 acres) and river estuaries.

Mâlain (French pronunciation: [malɛ̃]) is a commune in the Côte-d'Or department in eastern France.

== Population ==
Historical population
Year	Pop.	±% p.a.
1968	564	—
1975	510	−1.43%
1982	554	+1.19%
1990	660	+2.21%
1999	750	+1.43%
2007	691	−1.02%
2012	722	+0.88%
2017	747	+0.68%
2023	798	+1.11%
Source: INSEE

== Sights ==
- The Château Fort Saint-Georges, or Château Fort de Mâlain, is a ruined castle with origins from the 11th century.

== See also ==
- Communes of the Côte-d'Or department
