= Battle of Mieszko I against Wichmann the Younger and the Wolinians =

967 battle of the Polish–Veletian War

- Part of the Polish–Veletian War
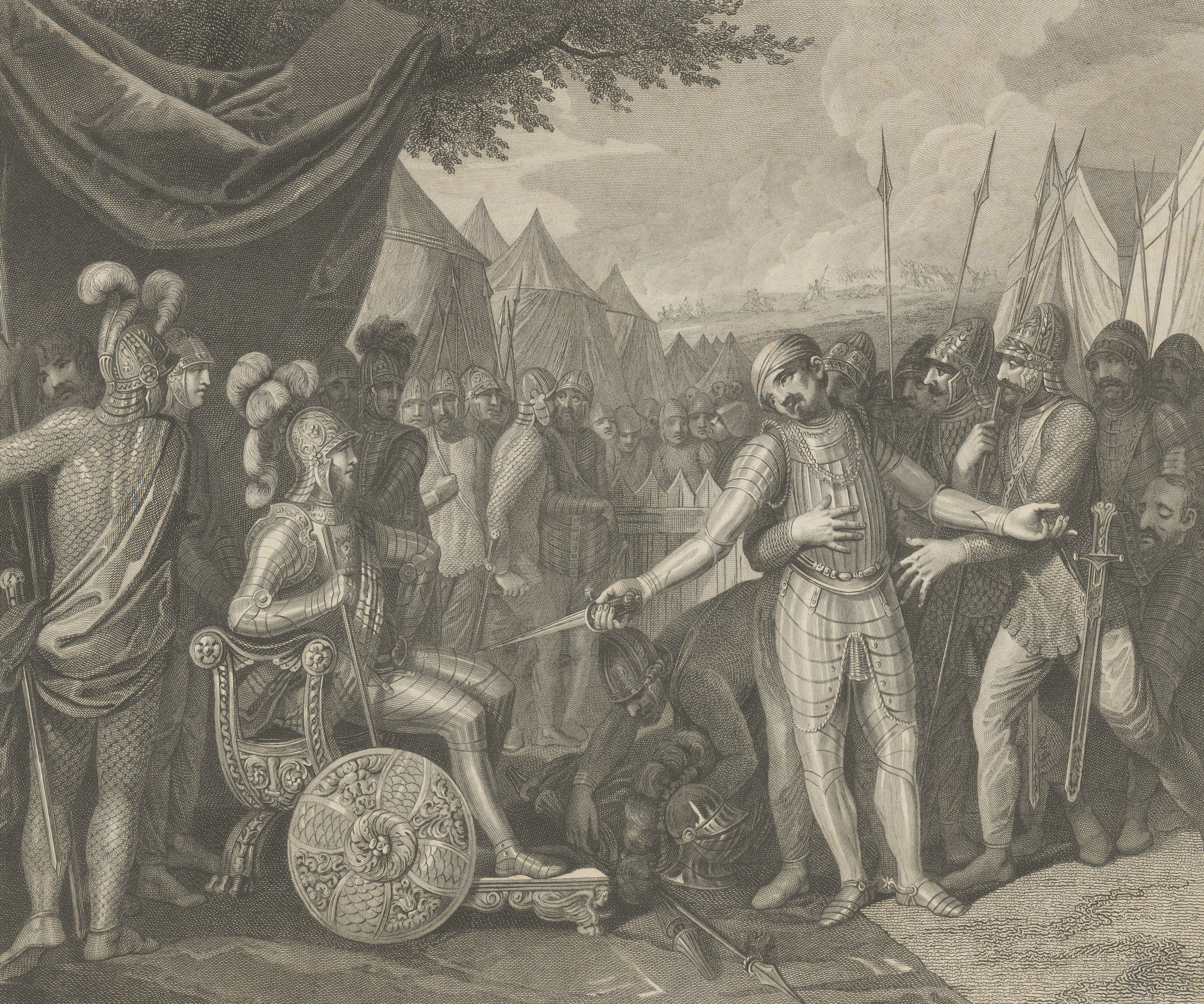
- The 1788 engraving by Franciszek Smuglewicz depicting Wichmann the Younger surrendering to Mieszko I following the battle.
Date	21/22 September 967
Location	Farther Pomerania
Result	Polish and Bohemian victory

Belligerents
Duchy of Poland; Duchy of Bohemia	Confederacy of the Veleti; Wolinians

Commanders and leaders
Mieszko I	Wichmann the Younger †

Strength
c. 4,000 Polish troops and armoured companions c. 100–300 Bohemian cavalry	c. 5,000–6,000 troops

Casualties and losses
Unknown	Heavy

The battle of Mieszko I against Wichmann the Younger and the Wolinians (Polish: Bitwa Mieszka I z Wichmanem Młodszym i Wolinianami; German: Schlacht von Mieszko I. gegen Wichmann den Jüngeren und die Wolliner) was fought during the Polish–Veletian War, on either 21 or 22 September 967, between the forces of the Duchy of Poland and the Duchy of Bohemia, led by duke Mieszko I, against the forces of the Confederacy of the Veleti and the tribe of Wolinians, led by count Wichmann the Younger. Ending with decisive Polish and Bohemian victory, and the death of Wichmann the Younger, it marked the end of the conflict, with the Duchy of Poland anexing the Farther Pomerania, including the island of Wolin. Fought somewhere in Farther Pomerania, the exact location of the battle remains unknown, with some historians theorising for it to take place near the village of Santok in modern Lubusz Voivodeship, Poland.

== Background ==
In 967, during the Polish–Veletian War, the forces of the Confederation of the Veleti, allied with the tribe of the Wolinian, attacked the Duchy of Poland from island of Wolin, heading south alongside the Oder river. Together they consisted of around five to six thousand warriors. The self-proclaimed leader of Vieleti, Wichmann the Younger, a nobleman and count from the House of Billung in the Duchy of Saxony, commanded a division of a cavalry. The forces under command of duke Mieszko I, the ruler of the Duchy of Poland, commanded around 4,000 Polish foot soldiers and armoured companions (medium cavalry) and 2 divisions of Bohemian cavalry, which consisted of between 100 and 300 cavalrymen.

With the aid from the tribe of the Prissani, which lived in the Duchy of Poland, the Polish and Bohemian forces traveled to the area near Szczecin and Wolin. Using scattered reconnaissance units, they had lured Veletian and Wolinian forces near the village of Santok (in modern Lubusz Voivodeship, Poland), waiting for a convenient moment to commerce the attack. On 20 September 967, both sides set up the camps. The battle was fought on either 21 or 22 September. The exact location of the battle remains unknown, though, it is theorizsed by some histories, that it could have taken place near Santok.

== Course of the battle ==
In the morning, the Veletiand and Wolinian forces noticed Polish foot soldiers set in the defensive formation. However, they were not aware of Polish armoured companions (middle calvary) and Bohemian cavalry, hidden on both sides of the field between both armies, setting a trap. Believing, that they outnumbered Polish forces, the Veletian and Wolinians left their fortified camp and formed offensive formations, made out of a few rows of troops, following which, they charged frontally onto Polish forces. During the first phase of the battle, Polish forces backed up under the attack of the enemy. It could have been an intentional maneuver ordered by Mieszko I, to lure Veletians and Wolinians deeper into his trap. As the battle progressed, Polish forces continued moving back. Eventually, the cavalry hidden on the sides attacked, surrounding the enemy and cutting them off from their camp. At the same time, Polish troops begun the frontal attack. Surrounded, the Veletian and Wolinians warriors suffered devastatingly high casualties. The battle ended with a decisive Polish and Bohemian victory.

== Aftermath ==
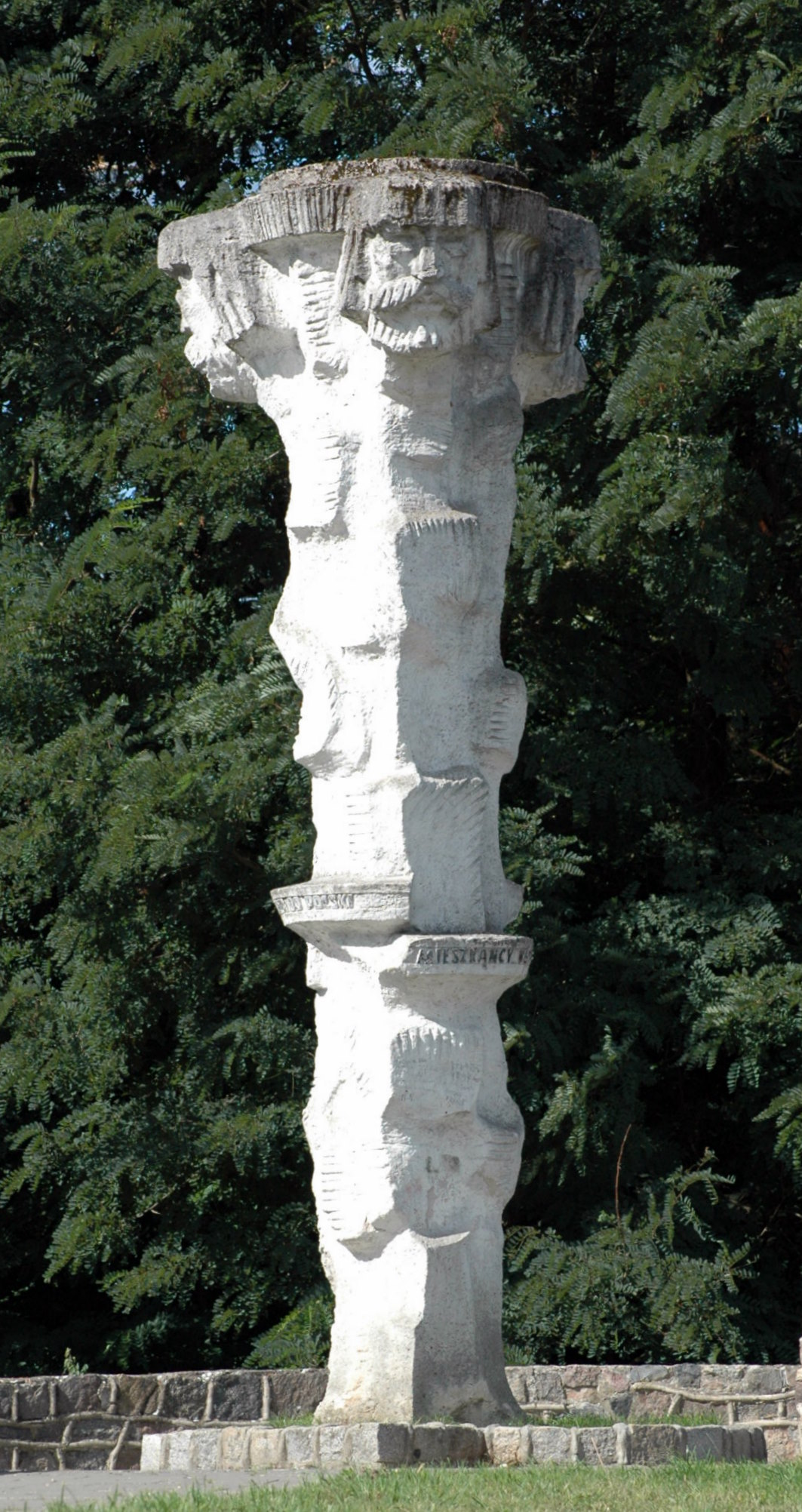
The statue of Triglav by Ryszard Chachulski, unveiled in 1967 in the town of Wolin in the commemoration of the one thousandth anniversary of the battle.

Wichmann the Younger, together with a small group of warriors managed to escape the battlefield, and was found and captured by Polish forces in the morning of the next day. There are two conflicting accounts of the following events. According to one version, after being surrounded by Polish troops, Wichmann surrounded himself to them. However, despite an agreement with Polish troops, he was killed by them in a fight. According to the second version, he died from the injuries he acquired in the battle. Following his death, Mieszko I given Wichmann's sword and armor to Otto I, the Holy Roman Emperor and the cousin of Wichmann. The battle marked the end of the Polish–Veletian War, with the Duchy of Poland annexing Farther Pomerania, including the island of Wolin. They remained within its boundaries until 1005.

== Commemoration ==
To commemorate the one thousandth anniversary of the battle, and the subsequent incorporation of the island of Wolin into Poland, the statue of Triglav have been unveiled in the town of Wolin in 1967. Sculptured by Ryszard Chachulski, the monument has a form of a vertical pillar three heads protruding from its top, alluding to the likeness of Triglav, a three-headed god from the Slavic pantheon, worshipped in the 12th century by Pomeranians in the area of Szczecin and Wolin, and possibly by Polabian Slavs in the area of Brandenburg an der Havel. The dedication of the monument was characterised as the commemoration of the "millennium of the incorporation of Pomerania into Poland".
