= Statue of Triglav =

Monument in Wolin, Poland

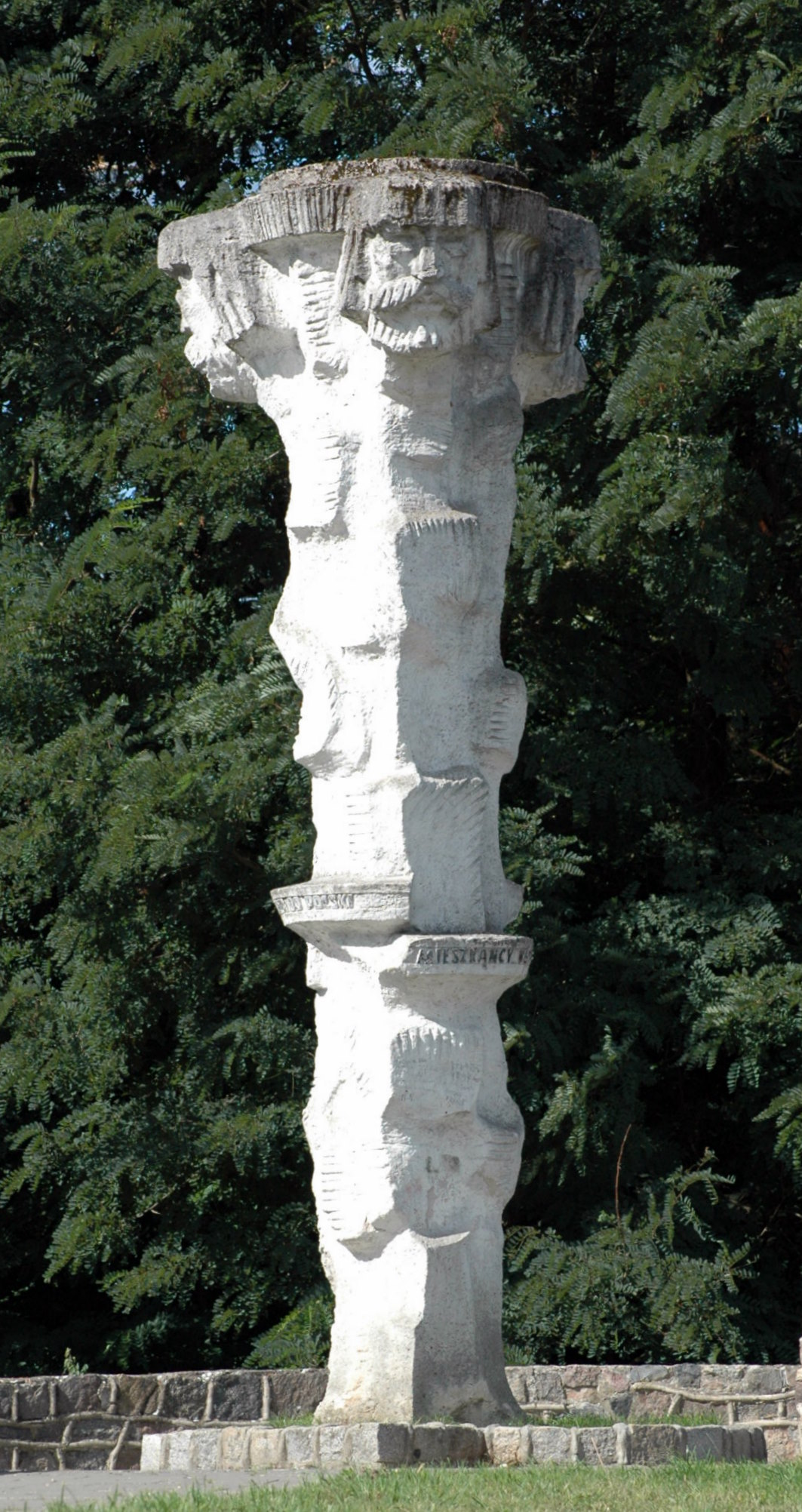
- The sculpture in 2009.
- Interactive map of Statue of Triglav
- Location: Municipal Park, Wolin, West Pomeranian Voivodeship, Poland
- Coordinates: 53°49′54.83″N 14°36′37.52″E
- Designer: Ryszard Chachulski
- Type: Sculpture
- Opening date: 1967
- Dedicated to: Triglav; Battle of Mieszko I against Wichmann the Younger and the Wolinians

The statue of Triglav (Polish: Posąg Trygława) is a concrete monument in the town of Wolin in West Pomeranian Voivodeship, Poland. It is placed on the Mieszko I Hill in the Municipal Park on Parkowa Street. The sculpture takes a form of a vertical pillar with three male heads protruding from its top, alluding to the likeness of Triglav, a three-headed god from the Slavic pantheon, worshipped in the 12th century by Pomeranians in the area of Szczecin and Wolin, and possibly by Polabian Slavs in the area of Brandenburg an der Havel. The monument was sculptured by Ryszard Chachulski, and unveiled in 1967. It commemoratedthe one thousandth anniversary of the battle of 967 in the Polish–Veletian War, in which forced of the Duchy of Poland and the Duchy of Bohemia, led by duke Mieszko I, have defeated the forces of the Confederation of the Veleti and Wolinians, led by Wichmann the Younger. The victory lead to the annexation of the Farther Pomerania, including the island of Wolin, into the Duchy of Poland, remaining under its control until 1005.

== History ==
The sculpture was created by Szczecin-based artist Ryszard Chachulski. It was unveiled in 1967, in the commemoration of the one thousandth anniversary of the battle of 967 in the Polish–Veletian War, in which forced of the Duchy of Poland and the Duchy of Bohemia, led by duke Mieszko I, have defeated the forces of the Confederation of the Veleti and Wolinians, led by Wichmann the Younger. It lead to the annexation of the Farther Pomerania, including the island of Wolin, into the Duchy of Poland, remaining under its control until 1005. The dedication of the monument was characterised as the commemoration of the "millennium of the incorporation of Pomerania into Poland". The sculpture itself takes a form of the likeness of Triglav, a three-headed god from the Slavic pantheon, worshipped in the 12th century by Pomeranians in the area of Szczecin and Wolin, and possibly by Polabian Slavs in the area of Brandenburg an der Havel.

The sculpture was renovated in 2024.

== Characteristics ==
The monument is placed on the Mieszko I Hill (Polish: Wzgórze Mieszka I) in the Municipal Park on Parkowa Street in Wolin. The sculpture takes a form of a vertical pillar with square base, with smaller circinate at the square base and widening towards the top, which is ended with a disk. It has a rough hewn texture, and it has three bearded male heads protruding from the top, being equally spaced out. At the middle of its height, the pillar features two protruding half-circles the middle of its height. They bare Polish-language inscriptions which read "Tysiąclecie włączenia Pomorza do Polski; mieszkańcy Wolina, and translate to "The milenium of the incorporation of Pomerania into Poland; the residents of Wolin". The sculpture alludes to the likeness of Triglav, a three-headed god from the Slavic pantheon, worshipped in the 12th century by Pomeranians in the area of Szczecin and Wolin, and possibly by Polabian Slavs in the area of Brandenburg an der Havel.
