= Polish–Veletian War =

10th-century war fought in Central Europe

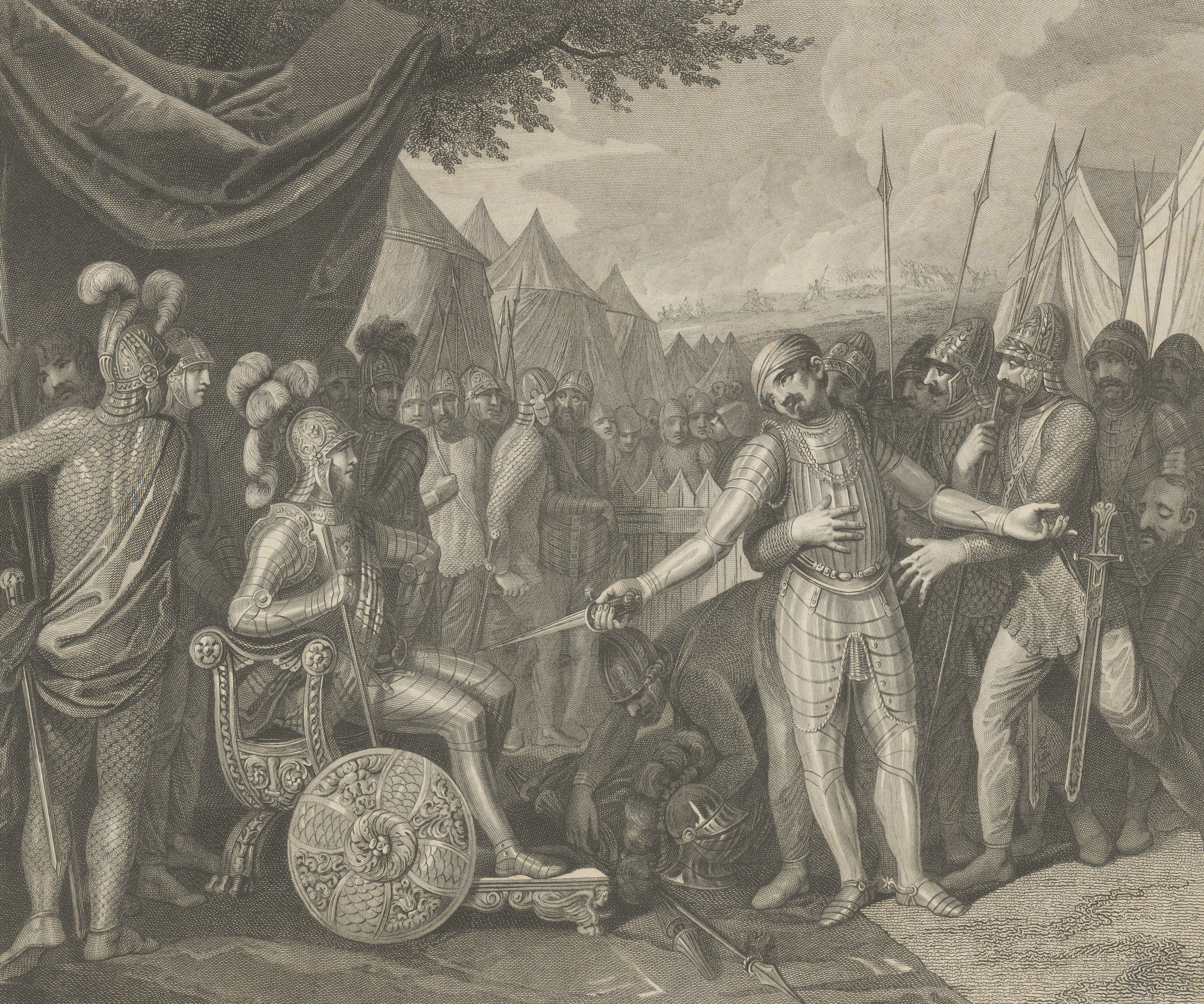
- Graphic by Franciszek Smuglewicz presenting Wichmann the Younger surrendering to Mieszko I after the final battle in 967.
Date	963–967
Location	Farther Pomerania
Result	Polish victory

Belligerents
Duchy of Poland; Duchy of Bohemia (967)	Confederacy of the Veleti; Wolinians (967); Supporters: Duchy of Bohemia (963–966)

Commanders and leaders
Mieszko I	Wichmann the Younger †

Polish–Veletian War (Note: Polish: Wojna polsko-wielecka; German: Polnisch-Wilzener Krieg) was a military conflict fought between 963 and 967, by the Duchy of Poland led by Mieszko I, with later aid of the Duchy of Bohemia against the Confederacy of the Veleti led by Wichmann the Younger, with later aid of Wolinians. The war consisted of 3 Veletian campaigns against Poland, the first two of which were won by Veleti, and the last one by Poland, ending the war and establishing Polish hegemony in the Farther Pomerania.

== War ==
=== 963–965 ===
The tribal Confederacy of the Veleti was at war with the Duchy of Poland since 963, organizing raids on its border regions. In 964, the tribe had allied with Wichmann the Younger, the exiled member of the Saxonian Billung dynasty. Under the command of Wichmann, they had organized 2 campaigns on Poland in 964, and 965. Both campaigns were victorious for Vieleti, who additionally got paid a tribute by Poland. During one of the campaigns, had died unknown by name brother of Mieszko I, duke of Poland. During their campaigns, they were supported by the Duchy of Bohemia.

=== 966 ===
In 966, in the event known at Christianization of Poland, Mieszko I had baptized himself, converting himself, and institutionally, his state, into Christianity. He made that in order to end Veleti–Bohemian alliance, and instead ally himself with Duchy of Bohemia.

=== 967 ===
In 967, the corps of Veletian, and, allied with them, Wolinian forces, had again attacked Poland, going from the north, from the island of Wolin, and heading to the south, alongside the Oder river. The forces of Veleti and Wolinains had consisted together of around 5 to 6 thousand soldiers. Self-proclaimed leader of Vieleti, Wichmann the Younger, had commanded a division of cavalry. Mieszko I had around 4 000 Polish troops and 2 divisions of Bohemian cavalry, that could count between 100 and 300 troops.

With the help of Prissani tribe that lived within Polish borders, Mieszko I had traveled with his forces to the area near Szczecin and Wolin. Using scattered reconnaissance units, he had lured enemy forces near Santok, waiting for a convenient moment to attack. On 20 September, both sides set up the camps. The decisive Battle between Mieszko I and Wichmann of the war was fought on 21 or 22 September. The exact location of the battle remains unknown, though, some historians assume that it happened near Santok. In the morning, Veleti had noticed Polish forces, set in the defensive formation. However, they were not aware of Polish armoured companions and Bohemian cavalry, hidden on both sides of the field between both armies, setting a trap. Believing, that they had outnumbered Polish forces, Veleti and Wolinians had left their fortified camp and formed offensive formations, made out of a few rows of troops, after what, they had charged frontally onto Polish forces. During the first phase of the battle, Polish forces had backed up under the attack of enemy forces. It could be an intentional move ordered by Mieszko I, to lure Veletians deeper into his trap. As the battle progressed, Polish forces continued moving back, in order to lure enemy forces further into the trap. Eventually, the cavalry hidden on the sides had attacked Veleti, surrounding them, and cutting their way to their camp. At the same time, the same time, Polish troops had stopped retreating, and begun the frontal attack. Surrounded, Veletian troops had started losing, receiving devastatingly high casualties. The battle ended with a decisive Polish victory.

Wichmann, together with a small group of soldiers, had managed to escape the battlefield, and was found and captured by Polish forces, in the morning of the next day. There are two versions of what happened to him next. According to one version, he got surrounded by Polish troops, following which he had surrendered himself to them, however, despite a previous agreement with Polish knights, he got killed by Polish soldiers in the fight. According to the second version, he had died from the injuries he had acquired in the battle. After his death, Mieszko, had given Wichmann's sword and armor to Otto I, the Holy Roman Emperor and the cousin of Wichmann. With the end of the battle, the war had ended. Poland had established the hegemony in the Farther Pomerania, gaining control over the region, including the island of Wolin.

== Notable battles ==
- Battle between Mieszko I and Wichmann

== Bibliography ==
- Tadeusz M. Nowak, Historia Oręża Polskiego 963–1795.
- Paweł Rochala, Cedynia 972, Bellona, Warsaw. 2002.
- Robert F. Barkowski, Bitwy Słowian, Bellona, Warsaw. 2018.
- Józef Dobosz. Monarchia i możni wobec Kościoła w Polsce do początku XIII wieku. Poznań. Wydawnictwo Poznańskie. 2002. ISBN 83-7177-110-X.
