= Pomerania in the Early Middle Ages =

Pomerania during the Early Middle Ages covers the History of Pomerania from the 7th to the 11th centuries.

The southward movement of Germanic tribes during the migration period had left territory later called Pomerania largely depopulated by the 7th century. Between 650 and 850 AD, West Slavic tribes settled in Pomerania. The tribes between the Oder and the Vistula were collectively known as Pomeranians, and those west of the Oder as Veleti and later Lutici. A distinct Slavic tribe, the Rani, was based on the island of Rügen and the adjacent mainland. In the 8th and 9th centuries, Slavic-Scandinavian emporia were set up along the coastline as powerful centers of craft and trade.

In 936, the Holy Roman Empire set up the Billung and Northern marches in Western Pomerania, divided by the Peene river. The Liutician federation regain independence in an uprising of 983 but succumbed to internal conflicts and disintegrated in the course of the 11th century. In the 960s, Poland integrated Pomerania from its eastern edge on the Vistula River to the mouth of the Oder River and the island of Wolin, and the short-lived Diocese of Kołobrzeg was installed in 1000 AD. Western Pomerania regained independence during the Pomeranian uprising of 1005.

During the first half of the 11th century, the Luticians participated in the Holy Roman Empire's wars against Piast Poland. The alliance broke off when Poland was defeated, and the Liutician federation broke apart in 1057 during a civil war. The Liutician capital was destroyed by the Germans in 1068/69, making way for the subsequent eastward expansion of their western neighbor, the Obodrite state. In 1093, the Luticians, Pomeranians and Rani had to pay tribute to Obodrite prince Henry.

== Migration period ==
The pattern of settlement in Pomerania started to change in the 3rd century. The prospering material cultures of the Roman Iron Age decayed. Only in some areas a continuity of these cultures is observed until the 5th and 6th centuries.

These changes are associated with the migration period, when Germanic tribes migrated towards the Roman Empire.

== Slavic Pomeranians ==
The 5th century marks the climax of an era that is characterized by a gap between the latest Germanic and the earliest Slavic archaeological findings in Pomerania, that researchers until today cannot explain sufficiently.

=== Origin debate ===
The origins of the Slavic tribes in Pomerania are subject to an ongoing debate. One school of thought, particularly popular among German researchers, sees the origins of these Slavs east of the Vistula and postulates a westward migration from there during the 6th and 7th centuries. It does not explain, however, the enormous increase in both the inhabited area and the numbers of the settlers. The second school of thought, popular among Polish researchers, seeks to prove an archaeological continuity from the cultures of the Roman Iron Age to the medieval Slavic culture. The third hypothesis postulates that parts of the Veneti were assimilated by the Germanic tribes while the rest became Slavs. No consensus on the subject has emerged.

=== First appearance of Slavic cultures ===
The first appearance of Slavs in the area is still unclear and is related to the question of the general ethnogenesis of the Slavs. According to German historiography, Slavic immigration took place between 650 and 850 AD, reaching first the southern parts of the mainland, Usedom and Wolin in the late 8th century, and Rügen in the 9th century. On the other hand, Polish historiography has stressed linkages between Roman-era cultures and later, clearly Slavic, populations.

The first archaeological records of Slavs in the Oder area are ceramics of the Sukow type dated back to the 6th or the beginning 7th century. The Sukow type is also known as Sukow-Szeligi group, Deez type, and Dziedzice type. These findings are associated with the first wave of immigrants from what is now southwestern Poland. For some areas, continuous settlement from the Roman to the Slavic era is suggested on the basis of analyses of pollen name transitions. Farther Pomerania and Pomerelia appear to have been unsettled in this period. Archaeological research in Pomerelia is less extensive than that of Farther Pomerania. It has been previously suggested that subsequent appearances of new material cultures were due to other waves of immigration, but it is presently interpreted as a mere technology transfer not involving mass migration.

Slavic Feldberg type ceramics, found in a region comprising the Oder area up to the Parsęta river, as well as Mecklenburg and Brandenburg, are dated back to the 7th and 8th century. Feldberg ceramics dominate west of the Oder since the mid-8th century, except for Northwestern Pomerania. This ceramic type is associated by some researchers with subsequent waves of migration from Silesia, Bohemia and Lesser Poland.

The Bavarian Geographer's anonymous medieval document, compiled in 830 in Regensburg, contains a list of the tribes in Central-Eastern Europe east of the Elbe. It mentions among others the Uuilci (Veleti) with 95 civitas, the Nortabtrezi (Obotrites) with 53 civitas, the Milzane (Milceni) with 30 civitas, and the Hehfeldi (Hevelli) with 14 civitas.

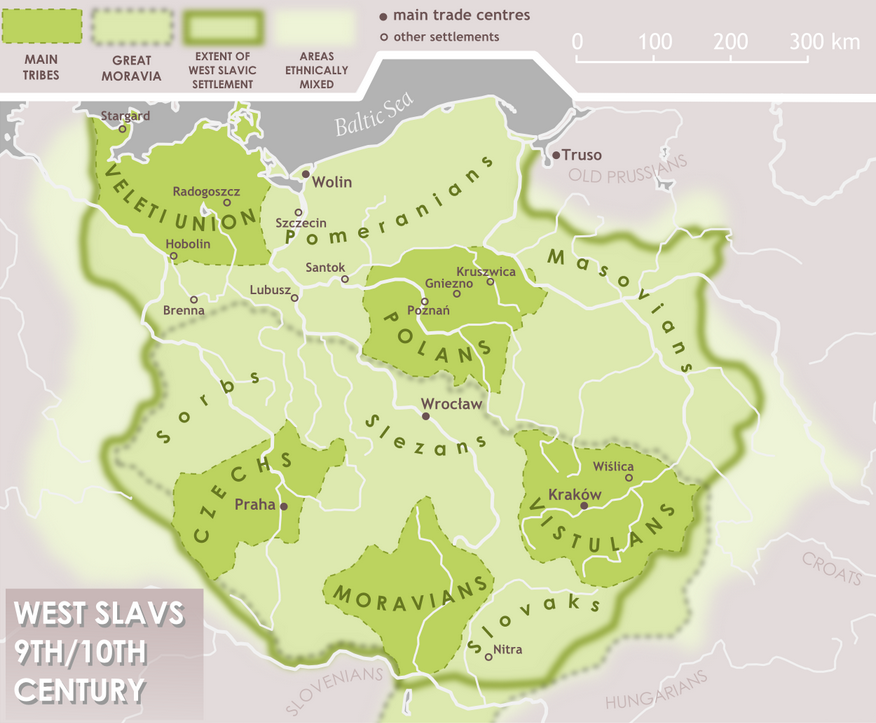
Distribution of Slavic tribes between the 9th–10th centuries

Pomerelia has also been settled by Slavs in the 7th and 8th century. Based on archaeological and linguistic findings, two hypotheses have been put forth: one posits that these settlers moved northward along the Vistula river, and another views them as the Veleti moving westward from the Vistula delta.

Slavic settlement extended to Western Pomerania in the 9th century and possibly as early as the 8th century. Dense Slavic settlement before the 9th century is especially unlikely for the northern areas, where findings of Feldberg ceramics are very rare. Freesendorf ceramics however, which became popular in the course of the 9th century, are found abundantly in northwestern Pomerania, too.

Soon after the Slavic settlement, Gords fortified with walls of wood and clay were built. One of the oldest gards is the stronghold of Dragovit, king of the Veleti, that was targeted by an expedition led by Charlemagne in 789 and is thought to be at modern Vorwerk near Demmin. The Slavs modeled their burghs and armament following West Central European standards, yet in the 8th and 9th century, the density of burghs in Mecklenburg and Pomerania became exceptionally high compared with other territories.

=== Tribal and territorial organization ===
Pomerania (Pomorze) as part of Poland under the Duke Mieszko I, 960-992

By the 9th to 11th century the region was recorded as inhabited by various tribes belonging to the Lechitic group of the West Slavs. The small tribes dwelling west of the Oder river were known collectively as "Veleti" (Wilzi), since the late 10th century as "Lutici" (Lutici), the tribes further east as "Pomeranians". Another distinct tribe, the Rani, lived on the island of Rügen and the adjacent mainland. These tribes spoke Polabian (Veleti, Rani) and closely related Pomeranian (Pomeranians) dialects. A Frankish document titled Bavarian Geographer (ca 845) mentions the tribes of Volinians (Velunzani), Pyritzans (Prissani), Ukrani (Ukri) and Veleti (Wiltzi) around the lower Oder.

From the 9th to the 11th century, at least ten Pomeranian tribes dwelled between the Oder and Vistula river. They are not known by name except for the Volinians and Pyritzans. It is not known if these tribes ever formed any kind of a tribal union. It is also possible that on the two sides of the river, the tribes were split from the beginning into eastern and western Pomeranian groups, with the latter possibly related to the Veleti.

The settlements of the distinct tribes were separated from each other and from their neighbors by vast woodlands. In 1124, it took Otto of Bamberg three days to cross the woods separating the Pomeranians from the neighboring Poles.

Among the various Pomeranian tribes, the territory of the Volinians was the smallest, but also the most densely settled, with about one settlement for every four square kilometers, around 1000 AD. In contrast, the other tribe explicitly mentioned in contemporary chronicles, was that of the Pyritzans, who inhabited the area around Pyrzyce and Stargard but whose settlements numbered roughly only one for every twenty kilometers. The center of the Volinian territory was a town located at the site of the modern town of Wolin on Wolin island. Russian, Saxon, and Scandinavian merchants lived in the town.

The Lutici tribes in 983 formed the Liutizian federation, comprising the Circipanes, Kessinians, Redarians, and Tollensians, probably also the Hevelli and Rani. The Volinians also played an important role. They were at various times both ally and military target of the Holy Roman Empire and Poland. The federation declined in the 1050s due to internal struggles (see below).

There are sparse records of dukes in this area, but no records about the extension of their duchies or any dynastic relations. The first written record of any local Pomeranian ruler is the 1046 mention of Zemuzil (in Polish literature also called Siemomysł) at an imperial meeting. A "dux Pomorie" is recorded for the year 997 in a 13th-century vitae of Adalbert of Prague, most probably seated in Gdańsk. Another chronicle written in 1113 by Gallus Anonymus mentions several dukes of Pomerania: Swantibor, Gniewomir, and an unnamed duke besieged in Kołobrzeg. A mention of a battle between the Pomeranians, Poles and Hungarians in the Gesta Hunnorum et Hungarorum, taken as historical by earlier historians, has been identified as medieval folklore, since the author Simon de Keza mixed up historical events with legends. This 13th-century chronicle reports that the later Hungarian king Bela I had fled to Mieszko II of Poland (mistaken for Casimir I), and defeated a Pomeranian duke ("Pomoranie ducem") in a duel. The Annals of Pegau (Annales Pegaviensis), written in 1150, mention a Wilk de Posduwc (Wolf of Pasewalk) as one of the grandfathers of the founder of Pegau Abbey and later margrave of Meissen, Wiprecht von Groitzsch, born 1050. The annals say that Wilk held a "Pomeranorum primatum". Since the oldest parts of these annals are regarded to resemble "legendary tales", it is uncertain whether Wilk is a historical or legendary figure. Pomeranian historian Adolf Hofmeister proposed that the record might nevertheless have a grain of truth in it, but in this case sees Wilk not as a universal ruler of Pomerania, but as a local or subordinate prince.

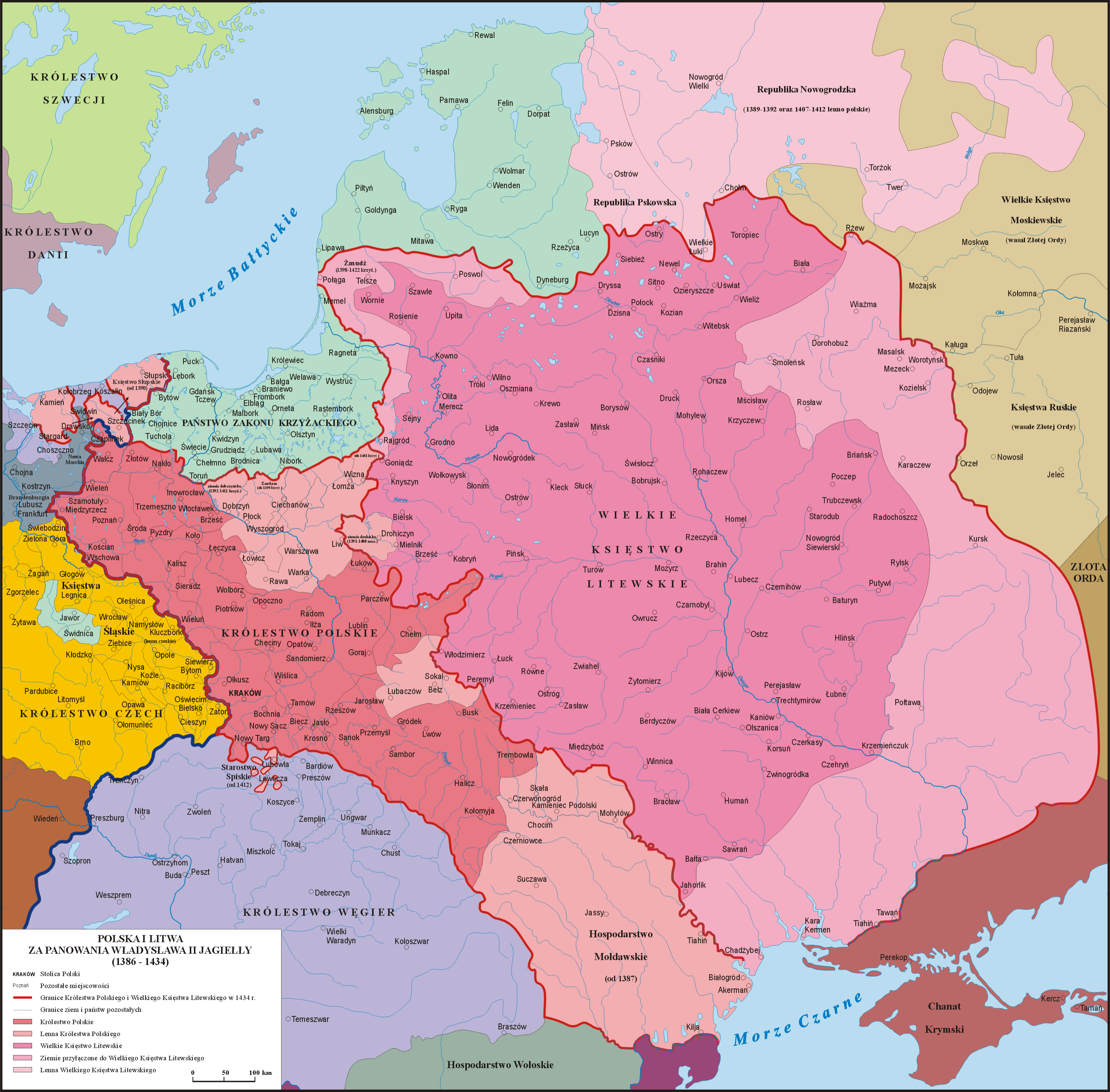
Duchy of Pomerania-Stolp (Słupsk) was fief of the Crown of the Polish Kingdom 1390-1446, 1466-1474

=== Languages ===
The western Slavs included the ancestors of the peoples known later as Poles, Pomeranians, Czechs, Slovaks and Polabians. The northern so-called Lechitic group includes, along with Polish, the dead Polabian and Pomeranian languages. The languages of the southern part of the Polabian area, preserved as relics today in Upper and Lower Lusatia, occupy a place between the Lechitic and Czecho-Slovak groups.

According to The Encyclopædia Britannica:

"Lekhitic languages, also spelled Lechitic, group of West Slavic languages composed of Polish, Kashubian and its archaic variant Slovincian, and the extinct Polabian language. All these languages except Polish are sometimes classified as a Pomeranian subgroup. In the early Middle Ages, before their speakers had become Germanized, Pomeranian languages and dialects were spoken along the Baltic in an area extending from the lower Vistula River to the lower Oder River. Kashubian and Slovincian survived into the 20th century; there were still a considerable number of native speakers of Kashubian in Poland and Canada in the 1990s. The extinct Polabian language, which bordered the Sorbian dialects in eastern Germany, was spoken by the Slavic population of the Elbe River region until the 17th or 18th century; a dictionary and some phrases written in the language exist".

=== Religion ===
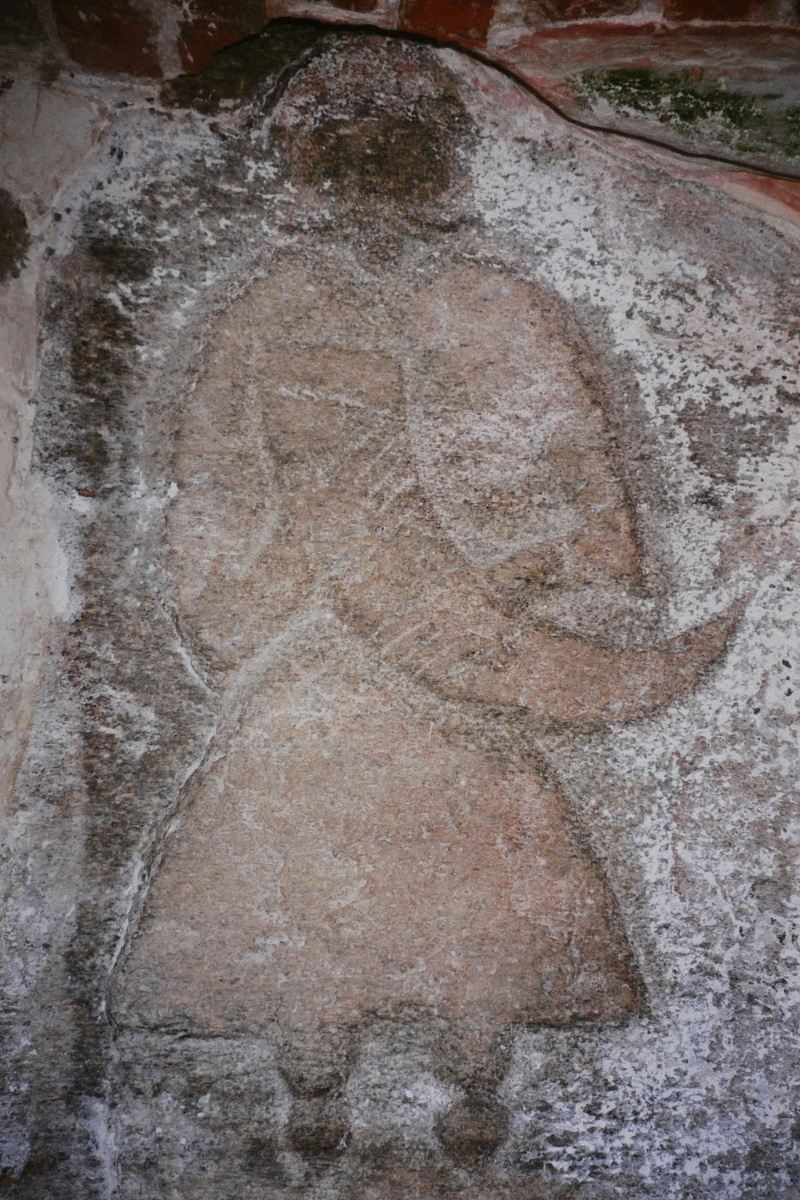
A priest of Svantevit depicted on a stone from Arkona, now in the church of Altenkirchen.

In the Middle Ages, Pomeranians, Liutizians and Rani worshipped gods of the Slavic mythology:

The gods were worshipped in temples, sacred groves, sacred trees and sacred springs. The priesthood was a powerful class of the society. The elders held their assemblies in the sacred places. Important decisions were made only after asking an oracle.

Among oracles were horse oracles in Szczecin and Arkona.

Major temple sites were:

- Arkona (Swantewit temple)
- Charenza (numerous temples, e.g. Porenut, Rugievit)
- Gützkow
- Wolgast (Jarovit temple)
- Wolin (worship an idol referred to as "The iron lance of Caesar")
- Szczecin, two to four temples, most notably the temple of Triglaw, a three-headed god and a sacred walnut tree

== Scandinavian settlements and emporia ==
Map showing area of Scandinavian settlement in the eighth (dark red), ninth (red), tenth (orange) and eleventh (yellow) centuries. Green denotes areas subjected to frequent Viking raids.

Viking Age Scandinavian settlements were set up along the southern coast of the Baltic Sea, primarily for trade purposes. Their appearance coincides with the settlement and consolidation of the Slavic tribes in the respective areas. Immigration going in both directions remains difficult to assess, but based on trade goods found within Slavic and Scandinavian settled areas belonging to both cultures, an exchange of population is hypothesized. It is known that Slavic and Scandinavian craftsmen had different processes in crafts and productions, as well as divergent boat-building traditions.

Their importance for trade with the Slavic world however was limited to the coastal regions and their hinterlands - while imported goods associated with Scandinavian trade have been found in the areas between Baltic coast, Mecklenburg Lake District and Pomeranian lake chain, evidence for contacts to distant Slavic areas further south is missing.

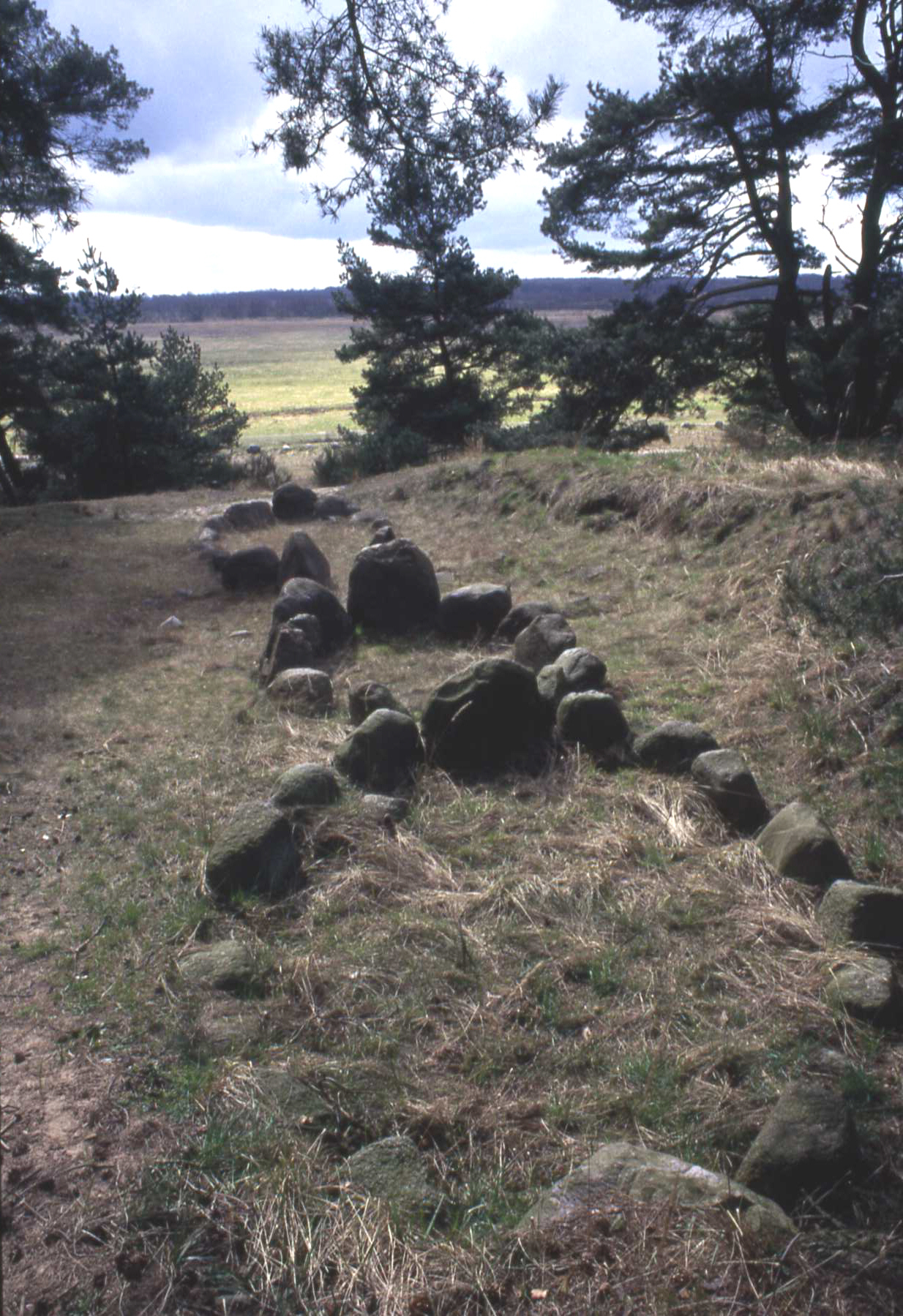
Stone ships at Altes Lager Menzlin

Scandinavian settlements at the Pomeranian coast include Wolin (on the isle of Wolin), Ralswiek (on the isle of Rügen), Altes Lager Menzlin (at the lower Peene river), and Bardy-Świelubie near modern Kołobrzeg. Menzlin was set up in the mid-8th century. In Wolin, seaside fortifications have been dated back to the beginning 10th century, yet remnants of older fortifications were also found, probably pointing to an earlier burgh with an adjacent open settlement. Wolin and Ralswiek began to prosper in the course of the 9th century.

Bardy-Świelubie differs from other emporia: The location is rather far from the coastline, and Bardy was built before 800, making it one of the earliest Slavic burghs in the coastal area. Archaeological findings indicate participation in Carolingian trade, but evidence of non-Slavic presence is missing. In the 9th century, Scandinavians (men and women) settled the site, as is evident from the adjacent Hügelgrab grave field in Świelubie. The exact site of the settlement, whether inside or close to the burgh, is not yet determined. A Slavic burgh as a predecessor for a Scandinavian settlement is not observed elsewhere, with the possible, but not yet evident exception of Wolin.

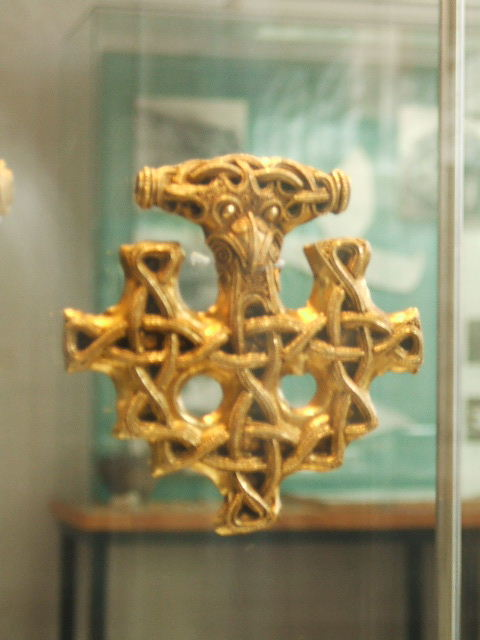
Viking jewelry, 10th century, found on Hiddensee

A merchants' settlement has also been suggested near Arkona, but no archaeological evidence supports this theory. Reric, formerly located at Rerik on the Fischland-Darß-Zingst peninsula in Western Pomerania, has recently been identified as Groß Strömkendorf on the eastern coast of Wismar Bay in Mecklenburg. Reric was set up around the year 700, but following later warfare between Obodrites and Danes, the merchants were resettled to Haithabu.

The exact ethnic composition of the settlements cannot be determined, it is thought that they had a multi-ethnic character - besides Scandinavians, a Slavic and Frisian presence has been suggested. Scandinavian presence is evident in artefacts, burial rites, and the type of houses.

Early emporia like Menzlin and Dierkow (just west of the Pomeranian border, near Rostock) reached their peak already in the 9th century, no imported goods are found from the 10th century. Bardy-Świelubie was vacated in the late 9th century, when the Slavic settlement of Kołobrzeg became the new center of the region. Ralswiek made it into the new millennium, but at the time when written chronicles reported the site in the 12th century it had lost all its importance. Wolin was destroyed by the Danes in the 12th century.

Scandinavian arrowheads from the 8th and 9th centuries were found between the coast and the lake chains in the Mecklenburgian and Pomeranian hinterlands, pointing at periods of warfare between the Scandinavians and Slavs.

=== Jomsvikings ===
Jomsborg (Jomsburg) was the name given by several medieval Scandinavian sources to a stronghold on the Pomeranian coast. It was set up by Danish king Harald Bluetooth and Styrbjörn in the course of Harald's internal struggles with his son, Sweyn Forkbeard, in the 970s or 980s, and housed a garrison of soldiers known as Jomsvikings. Jomsborg is believed today to be identical with Vineta, Jumne and Wolin. Harald is reported to have died in Jomsborg after he was wounded trying to regain his power with a Jomsviking and Norman fleet. Sweyn was captured by the Jomsvikings and held hostage in Jomsborg, until a peace was negotiated and Sweyn as well as Harald's body were sent back to Denmark.

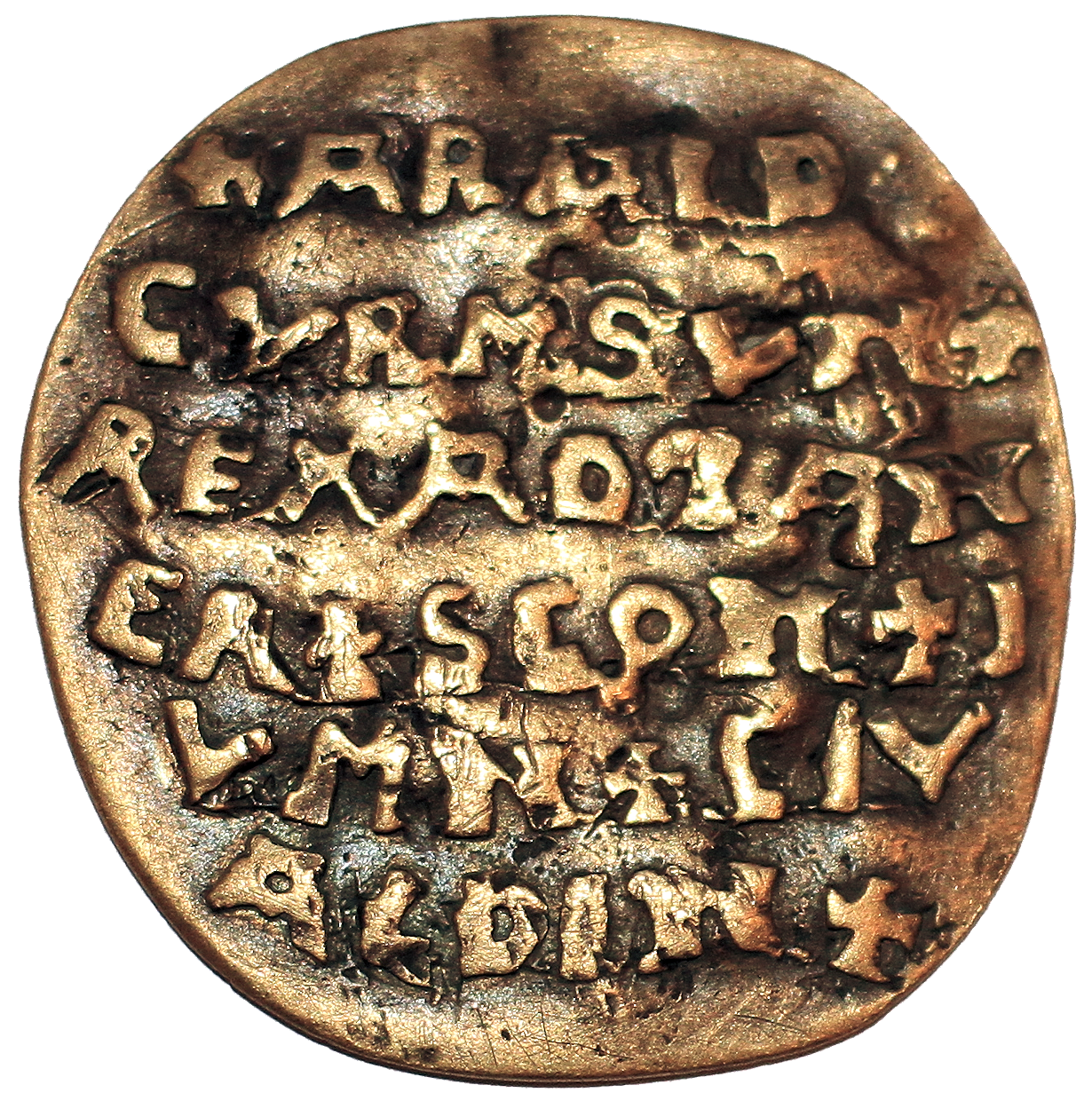
Curmsun Disc - Obverse, Jomsborg, 980s

== Trade, robbery, and piracy ==
Scandinavian emporia and major Slavic burghs were set up primarily at junctions of long-distance trade routes. Such trade routes ran along the Vistula river, reaching the coast at Truso and Gdańsk; along the western bank of the Oder, coming from the Danube area and Moravia and forking north of Schwedt with the eastern fork running through Szczecin and reaching the sea at Wolin, while the western fork ran through Menzlin and reached the sea at Wolgast and Usedom. Routes from Prague and the western parts of the Holy Roman Empire met at Magdeburg, which in turn was connected to Mecklenburg and Reric by a northern route, with Demmin and Menzlin by a northeastern route, and with the Oder route by an eastern route running through the Uckermark. Another trade route connected Mecklenburg and Reric with Usedom and Wolin, running through Werle, Lüchow, Dargun, Demmin and Menzlin.

Trade item	Cost in gramms of chopped silver
horse	150g-300g
sword	125g
lance	50g
spurs	20g
knife	2,8g
cow	100g
ox	125g
pig	30g
sheep	10g-15g
slave (male)	300g
slave (female)	200g

From the coastal emporia, these routes were connected to sea trade routes of the Baltic Sea. Vessels build for seafaring were also able to navigate in the lower Recknitz river, Peenestrom and lower Peene river up to Demmin, and Oder river up to Silesia. Already in the 9th century, wooden and waterproof containers were in use that were easy to transport by carriage as well as by ship.

Trade, robbery, and piracy did not exclude each other, but were then two sides of the same coin. Whether one traded or stole depended on one's own military strength or protection compared to the abilities of the encountered party. Slavic piracy, especially from Rügen and Wolin, climaxed in the 11th century. Denmark, being the major target, launched several expeditions to stop this piracy, such as an expedition directed at Wolin and the Oder estuary led by king Magnus in 1043, and several expeditions initiated by Eric Ejegod, father of Canute Lavard, in the late 11th century.

Major trade items were livestock, especially horses; wheat, honey, wax, and salt; grind and millstones; jewelry and luxury articles like pearls and items made from glass, semi-precious stones, gold, silver and amber; weapons, and slaves. Acquisition of loot and capture of people for slave trade were primary war aims in the many campaigns and expeditions of the Slavic tribes and invaders from outside Pomerania. Also, merchants' caravans did not only engage in slave trade, but also captured people to sell them as slaves.

If not exchanging goods with an equal value, one used linen, iron and silver for payment. Iron was cast to non-functional daggers, spades, and axes, while silver was either used minted to coins, or as chopped silver items (including jewelry and coins). Before 950, silver coins originated primarily in Arabia, after 950 these were used together with western European coins, which since the late 10th century largely replaced the Arabic ones. Also, coins minted in Haithabu were abundantly used in the western regions of Pomerania up to the lower Oder region.

== Billung and Northern marches (936–983) ==
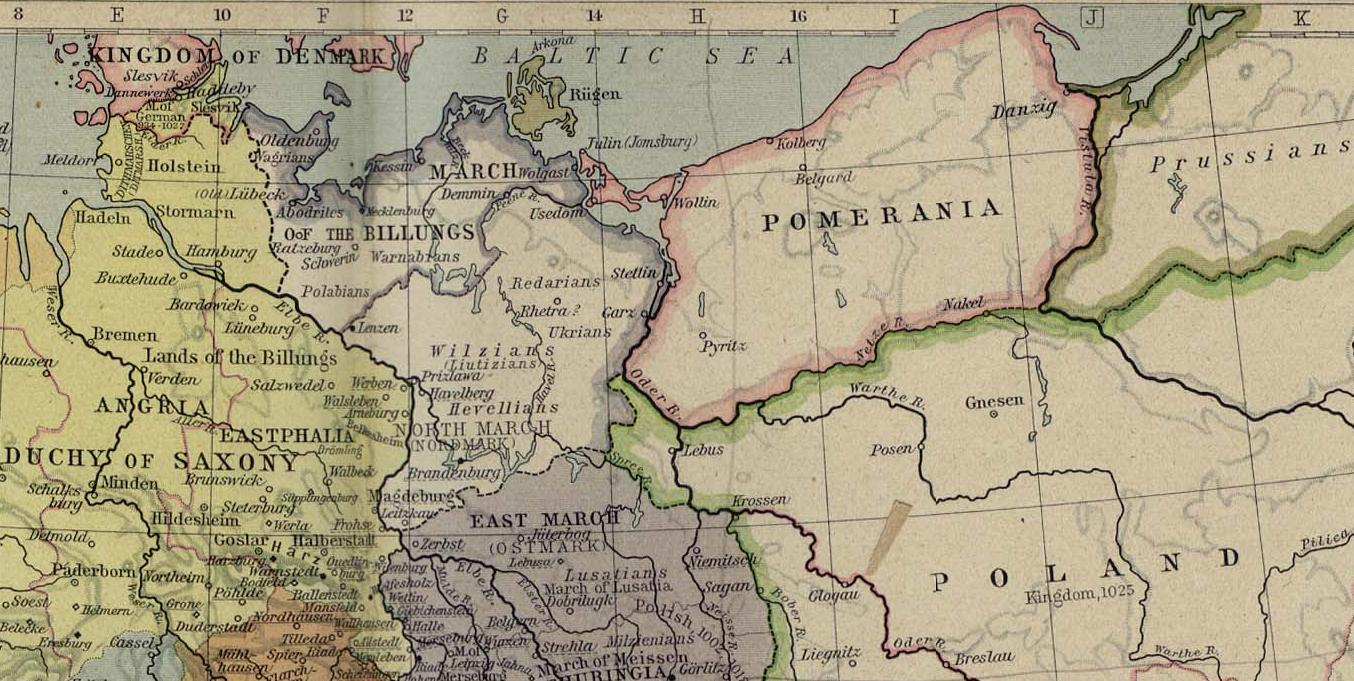
Northern Central Europe, 919-1125. March of the Billungs is indicated, Northern March is the area south of it (purple). Independent Pomeranian areas are indicated (rose)

In 936, the area west of the Oder River was incorporated in the March of the Billungs (north of the Peene River) and the Northern March (south of the Peene River) of the Holy Roman Empire. The respective bishoprics were the Diocese of Hamburg-Bremen and Diocese of Magdeburg. In the Battle of Recknitz ("Raxa") in 955, German and Rani forces commanded by Otto I of Germany suppressed an Obodrite revolt in the Billung march, instigated by Wichmann the Younger and his brother Egbert the One-Eyed In 983, the area regained independence in an uprising initiated by the Liutizian federation. The margraves and bishops upheld their claims, but were not able to reinforce them despite various expeditions. A similar pagan reaction in Denmark between 976 and 986, initiated by Sven Forkbeard, forced his father Harald Bluetooth to exile to Wolin.

== Pomerania as part of Poland and formation of the Diocese of Kołobrzeg ==
The first Polish duke Mieszko I included Eastern Pomerania within the emerging Polish state in c. 960, and then further captured Pomerania to the mouth of the Oder River and the Wolin island in the west by c. 967. The western border of Poland was possibly along the Rędowa River (Randow). He also fought the Volinians, but despite a won battle in 967, he did not succeed in expanding his Pomeranian gains. His son and successor Bolesław I continued to campaign in Pomerania, but also failed to subdue the Volinians and the lower Oder areas.

During the Congress of Gniezno in 1000, Bolesław created the first, yet short-lived bishopric in Pomerania Diocese of Kołobrzeg, subordinate to the Archdiocese of Gniezno, headed by Saxon bishop Reinbern, which was destroyed when Pomeranians revolted in 1005. Of all Luticians, the Volinians were especially devoted to participation in the wars between the Holy Roman Empire and Poland from 1002 to 1018 to prevent Bolesław I from reinstating his rule in Western Pomerania. All of Pomerania came under the ecclesiastical administration of the Archdiocese of Gniezno.

The stronghold of Gdańsk was founded during the rule of Mieszko I. Eastern Pomerania with the chief city of Gdańsk remained within Poland, and was Christianized.

== German-Lutician alliance ==
In the aftermath of the uprising of 983, Holy Roman Emperor Otto III sought to reinstate his marches and upheld good relations with Piast Poland, which was to be integrated in a reorganized empire ("renovatio imperii Romanorum"). These plans, reaching a climax with the Congress of Gniezno in 1000 AD, were thwarted by Otto's death in 1002, the subsequent rapid expansion of the Piast realm, and the resulting change in Polish politics. After conquering Bohemia, parts of Hungary and Kievan Rus', Bolesław I of Poland refused to give his oath to Otto's successor, Henry II, and instead allied with German dukes and margraves opposing Henry. Thus, Henry, for a tribute, offered an alliance to the Luticians when he met with their representatives at a Hoftag in Merseburg on March 28, 1003.

Parts of the German clergy and nobility however did not approve this alliance, because it thwarted their ambitions to reintegrate the Lutician territories in their marches and bishoprics. Among those who disapproved was Thietmar of Merseburg, a contemporary chronicler whom we own the reports of the subsequent events. During the expedition to Poland in 1005, the Christian German army was "shocked" when the pagan Luticians showed up carrying their idols with them. Many of the nobles now ordered by Henry to fight Bolesław were just years before involved with the German-Polish alliance by fighting the Luticians and arranging marriages with the House of Piast. In another expedition in 1017, when Hermann Billung commanded an army comprising several Lutician units, one of Billung's men threw a rock at an idol of a Lutician goddess, with the consequence that Henry had to pay the Luticians twelve punds of silver. Bolesław on the other hand prepared an anti-Lutician alliance which he termed "brotherhood in Christo", but at the same time tried to bribe the Luticians and have them carry out attacks on the empire. In 1007, Luticians reported a bribery case to Henry, while in 1010, Hevellian renegades were caught by Henry's troops, indicating that the German and Polish offers at least to some degree divided the Luticians.

In 1012, the German-Lutician alliance of 1003 was renewed in Amberg. In 1017, after an idol of a Lutician goddess got lost when German and Lutician units crossed the Mulde river during a flood, the Luticians left the expeditions and held an assembly on whether or not continue the alliance after this omen - though they eventually decided in favor of the alliance, an inner division of the Luticians in this case was evident again.

The alliance broke off, when Henry's successor, Konrad II managed to subdue Poland, then led by Bolesław's successor, Mieszko II. Starting in 1129, several imperial campaigns with Danish and Kievian participation resulted in the Peace of Merseburg, concluded in 1033. With the Polish threat, the primary precondition for the German-Lutician alliance was thus eliminated, and hostilities started the same year.

== Lutician decline and Obodrite expansion ==
In 1056/57, the Lutician federation fell apart during a civil war ("Lutizischer Bruderkrieg"). The expanding Obodrite state, then led by Gottschalk and supported by Danish Sven Estridson, Gottschalk's father-in-law, and Saxon duke Bernhard II, engaged in the Lutician war and incorporated the Kessinian territory and Circipania in 1057. While the Obodrite state was temporarily weakened by a revolt in 1066 that cost Gottschalk's life, Burchard I, bishop of Halberstadt invaded the Lutician area in the winter of 1067/68, raided their capital Rethra, captured the holy steed, Rethra's most important Svarozic oracle, and rode it to Halberstadt. In the winter of 1069, Henry IV, Holy Roman Emperor again raided and looted the area.

However, inner quarrels hindered the empire to pursue further conquests, and in 1073, Henry IV as well as his Saxon opponents offered alliances to the Luticians outbidding each other with favourable conditions and benefits. As a result, the Luticians allied with neither party, but instead started another civil war over which alliance they should conclude. In addition, Bolesław II of Poland also canvassed the Luticians for joining an anti-German coalition with Denmark. As a consequence, Lutician military power was completely exhausted in the course of the 11th century. In 1093, Helmold of Bosau reported that among others the Luticians, Pomeranians and Rani had to pay tribute to Obodrite prince Henry.

== Bibliography ==
- Werner Buchholz et al., Pommern, Siedler, 1999/2002, ISBN 3-88680-780-0, 576 pages; this book is part of the Deutsche Geschichte im Osten Europas series and primarily covers the history of the Duchy of Pomerania and Province of Pomerania from the 12th century to 1945, and Western Pomerania after 1945.
- Labuda, Gerard (1993). "Chrystianizacja Pomorza (X–XIII stulecie)". Studia Gdańskie (in Polish). Vol. IX. Gdańsk-Oliwa.
- Jan Maria Piskorski et al. (Werner Buchholz, Jörg Hackmann, Alina Hutnikiewicz, Norbert Kersken, Hans-Werner Rautenberg, Wlodzimierz Stepinski, Zygmunt Szultka, Bogdan Wachowiak, Edward Wlodarczyk), Pommern im Wandel der Zeiten, Zamek Ksiazat Pomorskich, 1999, ISBN 83-906184-8-6 OCLC 43087092. This book is a co-edition of several German and Polish experts on Pomeranian history and covers the history of Pomerania, except for Pomerelia, from the earliest appearance of humans in the area until the end of the second millennium. It is also available in a Polish version, ISBN 83-910291-0-7.
- Srokowski, Stanisław (1947). Pomorze Zachodnie. Studium geograficzne, gospodarcze i społeczne (in Polish). Instytut Bałtycki.
