= Cealadragus =

Prince of the Confederation of the Veleti, ruling in 823

Prince of the Veleti
- Reign: 823–?
- Predecessor: Milegast
- Successor: Unknown
- Father: Liub

Cealadragus (Latin pronunciation: [t͡ʃe.aˈlaː.dra.ɡus]; Polish: Całodróg, [t͡saˈwɔ.druk]; 8th/9th century) was a prince of the Confederation of the Veleti, a group of Polabian Slavic tribes in Western Pomerania in Central Europe. He was the second son of Liub. In 823, he replaced his brother on the throne, after the later was deposed in an uprising. The length of the Cealadragus's rule and his successor remains unknown.

== History ==
Cealadragus, born at the end of 8th century or in the beginning of the 9th century, was the youngest, second son of Liub, the prince of the Confederation of the Veleti, a group of Polabian Slavic tribes in Western Pomerania in Central Europe. He had an older brother, Milegast. He was a grandson of Dragovit.

His father died in 823, in the battle fought against the tribe of Obotrites. Following his death, he was succeeded on the throne by Milegast, becoming the ruler of the Confederation of the Veleti. He ruled against the tribal customs and attempted to strengthen his power and weaken the power of the tribal council. This led to an uprising in 823, in the result of which, he was deposed, and replaced by his brother, Cealadragus. In the same year, in the meeting in Frankfurt, emperor Louis the Pious, the ruler of the Carolingian Empire, validated Cealadragus's claim to the throne, ending the dispute between brothers. The length of the Cealadragus's rule and his successor remains unknown.
