= Wilzen =

Wilzen may refer to:

- the German exonym for the Veleti group of West Slavic tribes.
- the German exonym for the town of Vilce, Latvia.
