= Liub =

Grand prince of the Veleti
- Reign: 810–823
- Predecessor: Dragovit
- Successor: Milegast
- Died: 823
- Issue: Milegast; Cealadragus
- Father: Dragovit

Liub (died 823; Latin: Liubi), also known as Lub, was the grand prince of the Confederation of the Veleti, ruling from 810 to 823. He was the eldest son, and successor, of Dragovit. Liub rulled together with his brothers, holding the title of the grand prince, as the eldest sibling. He had two sons, Milegast, and Cealadragus. After his death, Milegast, as the eldest son, succeeded his throne in 823. Later that year, he was deposed in an uprising and replaced by the younger brother, Cealadragus.

== History ==
Liub was a son of Dragovit, the ruler of the Confederation of the Veleti, located in Western Pomerania in Central Europe. After the death of his father in 810, together with younger brothers (of which the number remains unknown), Liub inherited the throne of the tribe. As the eldest brother, he held the title of the grand prince. He continued leading his tribe in the war against the Carolingian Empire and the tribe of Obotrites, that his father fought before him. At this time, the Kingdom of Denmark, which was allied with Veleti, signed a peace treaty with Emperor Charlemagne, ruler of the Carolingian Empire. During the war, Liub led successful raids in the eastern Old Saxony.

Between 811 and 812, he led his army against the Carolingian forces. In the first campaign, Carolingian forces repelled Veletian attacks and recaptured fortresses in Old Saxony. In the second campaign, Liub's forces experienced a heavy defeat, resulting in him agreeing to release the prisoners of war, and obliged to pay a tribute to the Carolingian Empire.

At the same time, the conflicts with the tribe of Obotrites continued. In 822, Liub sent a message to the Emperor Louis the Pious, the ruler of the Carolingian Empire, complaining about Ceadrag, the ruler of Obotrites. In May 823, the war between Veleti and Obotrites broke out, with the latter being assisted by Carolingian troops. Liub died in 823, in the battle fought against the tribe.

Liub had two sons, Milegast, and Cealadragus. After his death, Milegast, as the eldest son, succeeded Liub's throne. Later that year, he was deposed in an uprising and replaced by his younger brother, Cealadragus.
