= Ukrani =

Ethnic group

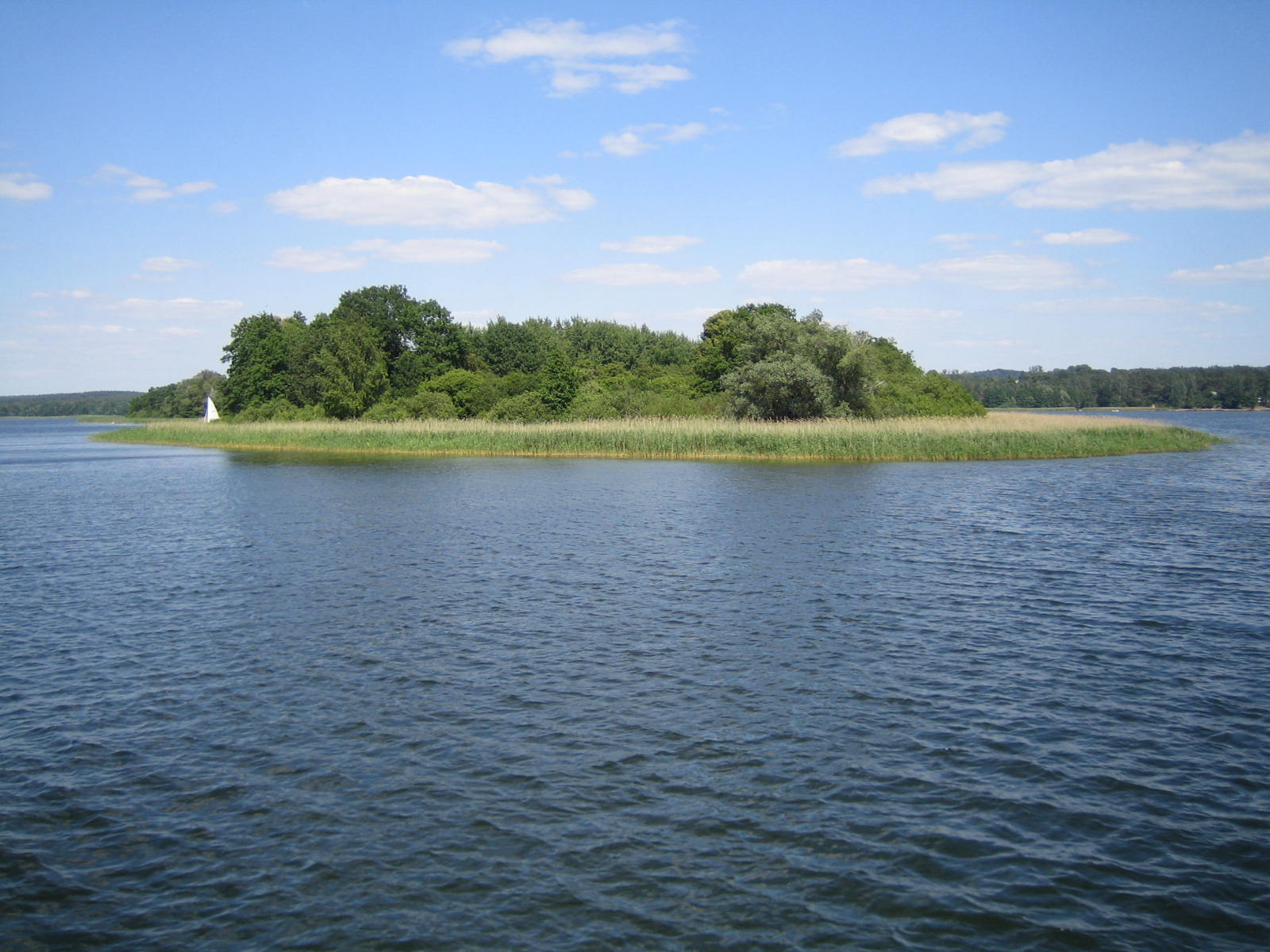
Burgwallinsel, a former Ukrian burgh on an isle in Lake Oberuckersee

The Ukrani or Ukrians (German: Ukranen, Ukrer, Vukraner, Polish: Wkrzanie) were a West Slavic Polabian tribe in the Uckermark (terra U(c)kera, Uckerland) from the 6th–12th centuries. Their settlement area was centered on the lakes Oberuckersee and Unteruckersee at the spring of the Uecker River. In this region, burghs with a proto-town suburbium were set up at Drense and on an isle in Lake Oberuckersee (near modern Prenzlau).

In 954, Margrave Gero of the Saxon Eastern March (the marca Geronis), aided by Holy Roman Emperor Otto I's son-in-law, Conrad of Lorraine, launched a successful campaign to subdue the Ukrians, who had come within reach of the Holy Roman Empire's Northern March after the 929 Battle of Lenzen. After the 983 revolt of the Obodrites and Lutici, the area became independent again, yet remained under permanent military pressure, especially from Poland and the Holy Roman Empire.

== See also ==
- Uckermark
- Ukranenland
- Pomerania during the Early Middle Ages
- List of medieval Slavic tribes
- Brandenburg
- Veleti
- Prissani
