= Dierkow =

Archaeological site in Germany

Coordinates: 54°07′N 12°10′E

Dierkow near Rostock, Mecklenburg, Germany, was a Viking Age Slavic-Scandinavian settlement at the southern Baltic coast in the late 8th and early 9th century. Neither the site itself, nor the adjacent Slavic burghs Kessin and Fresendorf have yet been sufficiently researched.

== See also ==
- Pomerania during the Early Middle Ages
- Viking Age
