= Milegast =

Prince of the Confederation of the Veleti, ruling in 823

Prince of the Veleti
- Reign: 823–823
- Predecessor: Liub
- Successor: Cealadragus
- Father: Liub

Milegast (8th/9th century; Latin: Milegastus; Polish: Miłogost) was a prince of the Confederation of the Veleti in Central Europe, ruling in 823. He was the eldest son, and successor, of Liub. He was deposed in an uprising in 823, and replaced with by younger brother, Cealadragus.

== History ==
Milegast, born at the end of 8th century, or at the beginning of the 9th century, was the eldest son of Liub, the ruler of the Confederation of the Veleti, located in Western Pomerania in Central Europe. He had a younger brother, Cealadragus.

His father died in 823, in the battle fought against the tribe of Obotrites. After his death, Milegast succeeded to the throne, becoming the ruler of the Confederation of the Veleti. He ruled against the tribal customs. He attempted to strengthen his ruling power and weaken the power of the tribal council. This led to an uprising in 823, in the result of which, he was deposed, and replaced by his brother, Cealadragus. In the same year, in the meeting in Frankfurt, Emperor Louis the Pious, the ruler of the Carolingian Empire, validated Cealadragus's claim to the throne, ending the dispute between the brothers.
