= Altes Lager (Menzlin) =

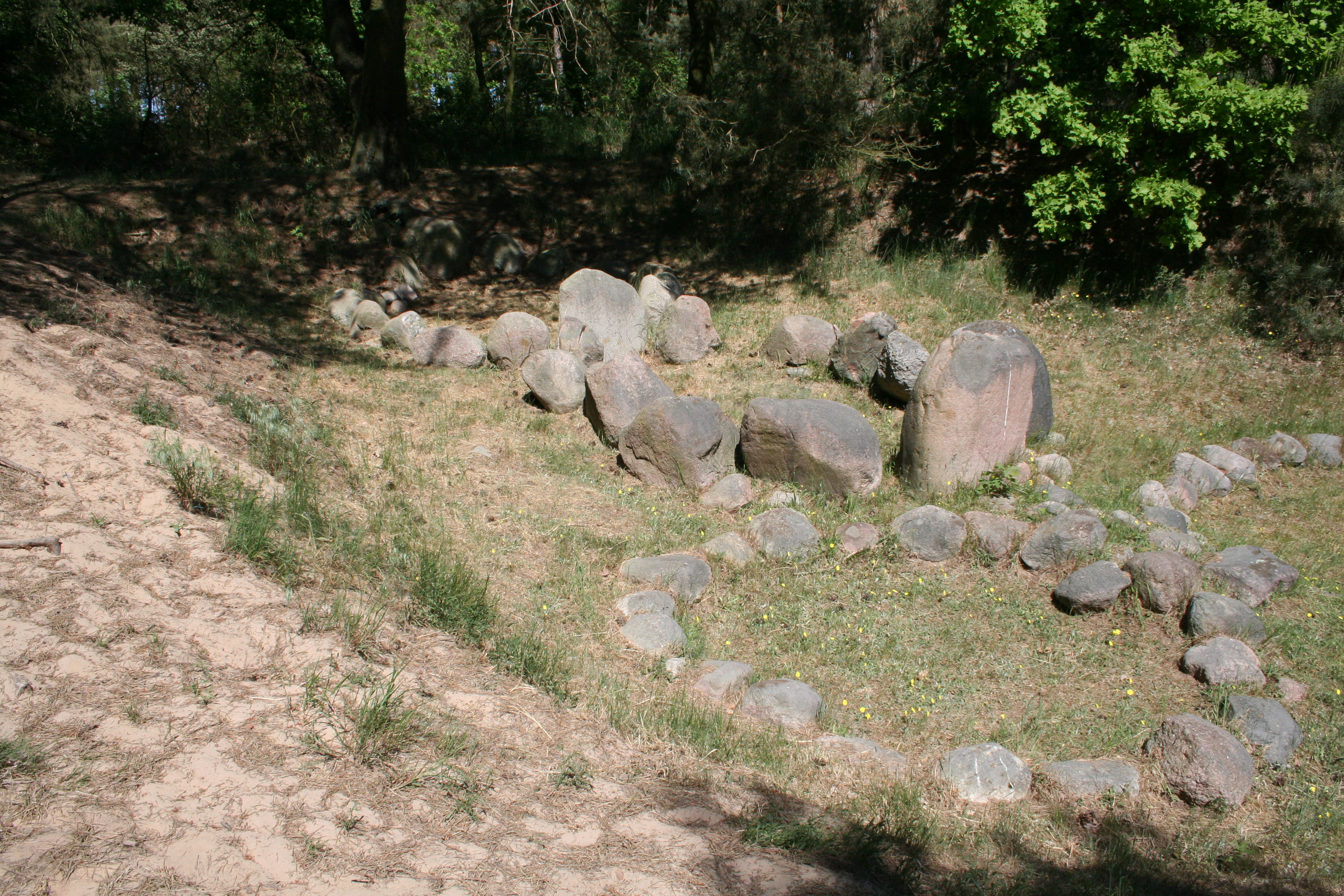
- Stone ships at Altes Lager Menzlin

- Location in Mecklenburg-Vorpommern
- 53°52′15″N 13°37′45″E
- Type: Settlement
- Location: Mecklenburg-Vorpommern, Germany

Site notes
- Condition: In ruins

Altes Lager (German for "Old Camp") is a site 1.5 kilometres (0.93 mi) south of the village of Menzlin near Anklam, Western Pomerania, Germany. The site, on the banks of the river Peene, was an important Viking trading-post during the Viking Age. At that time, Pomerania was inhabited by Slavic Wends, yet several Viking trading-posts were set up along the coast (the nearest were Ralswiek to the West and Jomsborg/Wollin to the east).

The settlement covered an area of approximately 18 hectares in the 9th century. Remnants of a bridge and a cemetery have been excavated. Some artifacts found in the graves originated in Ireland and in the lands east of the Baltic. Following Scandinavian customs, the dead were buried either in stone ships, i.e. ship-like graves, or within stone circles. The graves excavated so far have been found to be the tombs of women. Most findings date back to the 9th and 10th centuries.

== Name ==
The ancient name of the site is unknown. Altes Lager, the current name, dates back to Friedrich Wilhelm I of Brandenburg's 1676 siege of Anklam.

== Sources ==
- J. Hermann (Hrsg): Archäologie in der Deutschen Demokratischen Republik. Stuttgart 1989
- Ulrich Schoknecht: Menzlin: Ein frühgeschichtlicher Handelsplatz an der Peene. Beiträge zur Ur- und Frühgeschichte der Bezirke Rostock. Schwerin und Neubrandenburg 1977
- H. Keiling: Menzlin, frühstädtisches Zentrum der Slawen mit Niederlassung skandinavischer Händler. In: H.Keiling: Archäologische Freilichtmuseum Groß Raden. Museumskatalog 7, Museum für Ur- und Frühgeschichte Schwerin 1989

== See also ==
- Pomerania during the Early Middle Ages
