= Niedamir =

12th-century merchant

Niedamir (Polish: [ɲɛˈda.mir]; Latin: Nedamirus) was a 12th-century merchant and magnate, from the tribe of Wolinians, who lived in the settlement of Wolin. He was described by Catholic monk Ebo of Michelsberg, in his writings about the life of missionary Otto of Bamberg.

== Biography ==
Niedamir was mentioned by Catholic monk Ebo, in his writings about the life of missionary Otto of Bamberg. According to him, Niedamir was a wealthy merchant, from the tribe of Wolinians, who lived in the settlement of Wolin. He possessed considerable property and was highly respected among his tribe. In his youth, he lived at the Saxonian court, where he was baptized, and after returning to his homeland, he secretly continued to practice Christianity. He donated three ships from his merchant feet to the Christian missionary Otto of Bamberg when he arrived in Wolin, for him to use them in his travel to Szczecin.

== Legacy ==
In 2007, in the town of Kamień Pomorski, Poland, launched a project to build replicas of historical ships, used during the High Middle Ages, in the Szczecin Lagoon. It was titled Klucz Niedamir (translation from Polish: Niedamir Key), in his honor. One of the ships build during the project, was also named Niedamir.
