= Ukranenland =

Coordinates: 53°37′02″N 13°59′53″E

Ukranenland, Torgelow

Ukranenland is an archeological village-museum in Torgelow in north-east Germany. The name comes from an old Slavic tribe, the Ukrani.

== Gallery ==
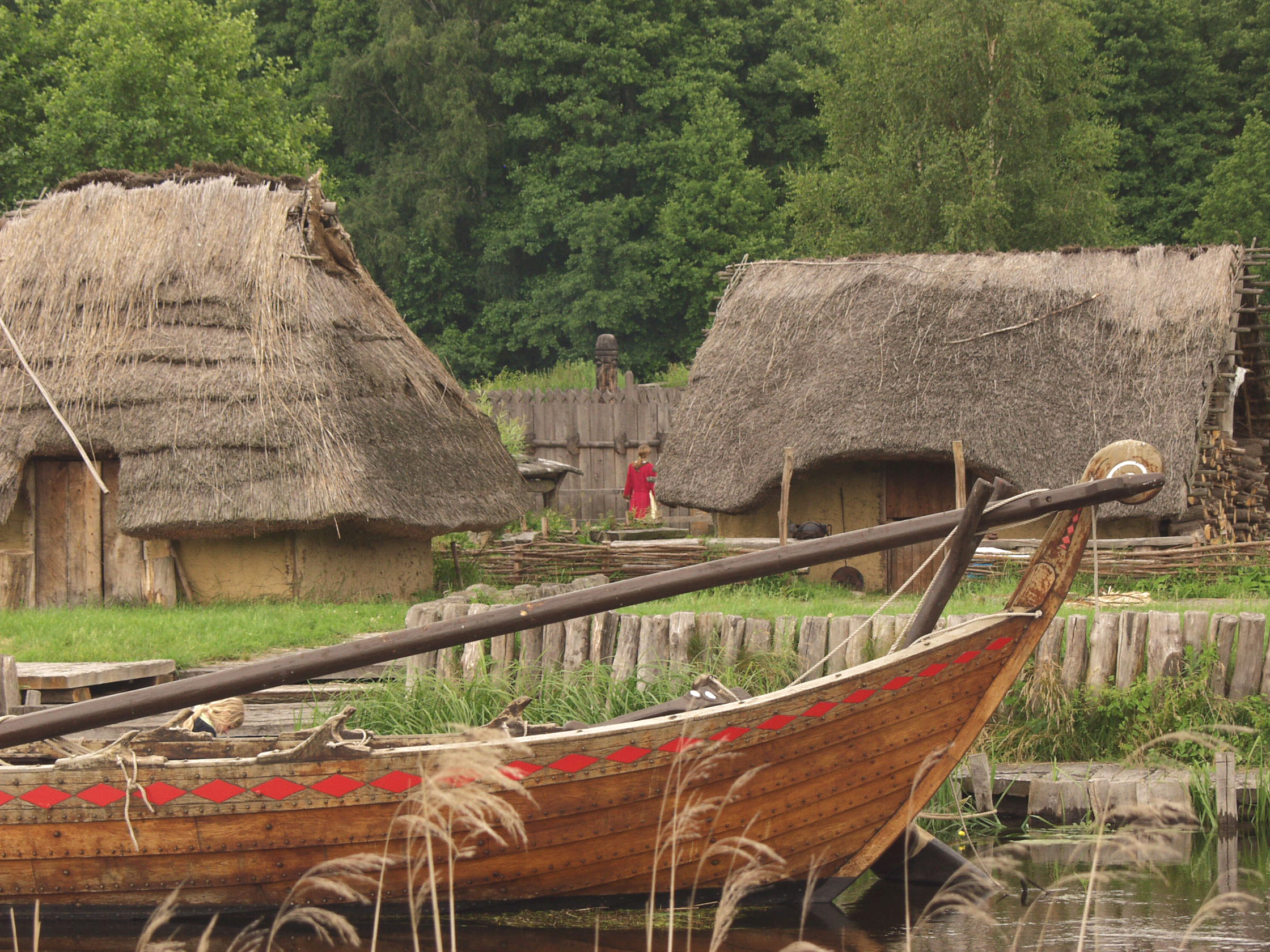
Scansen

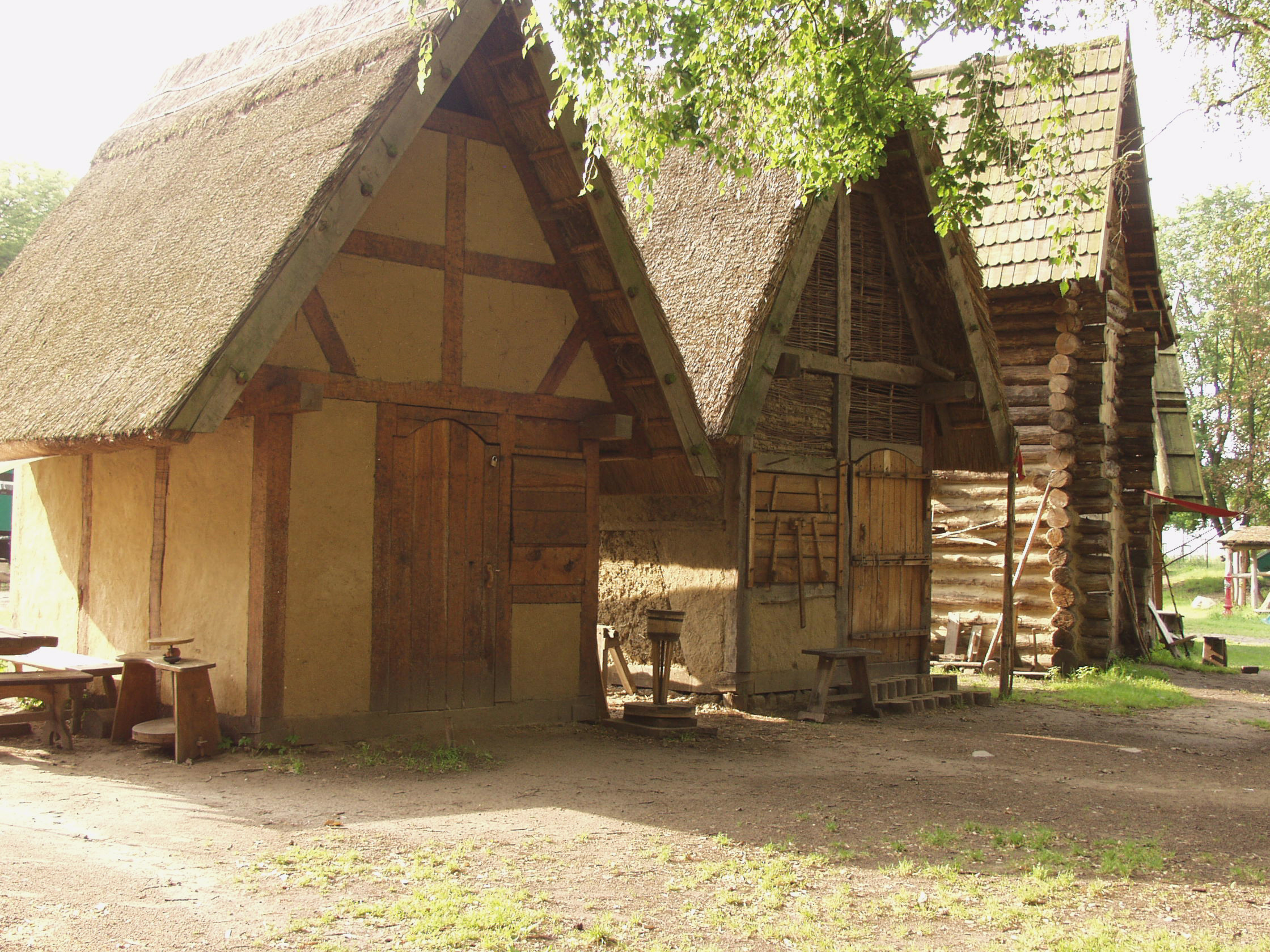
In the Middle Age center of Castrum Turglowe

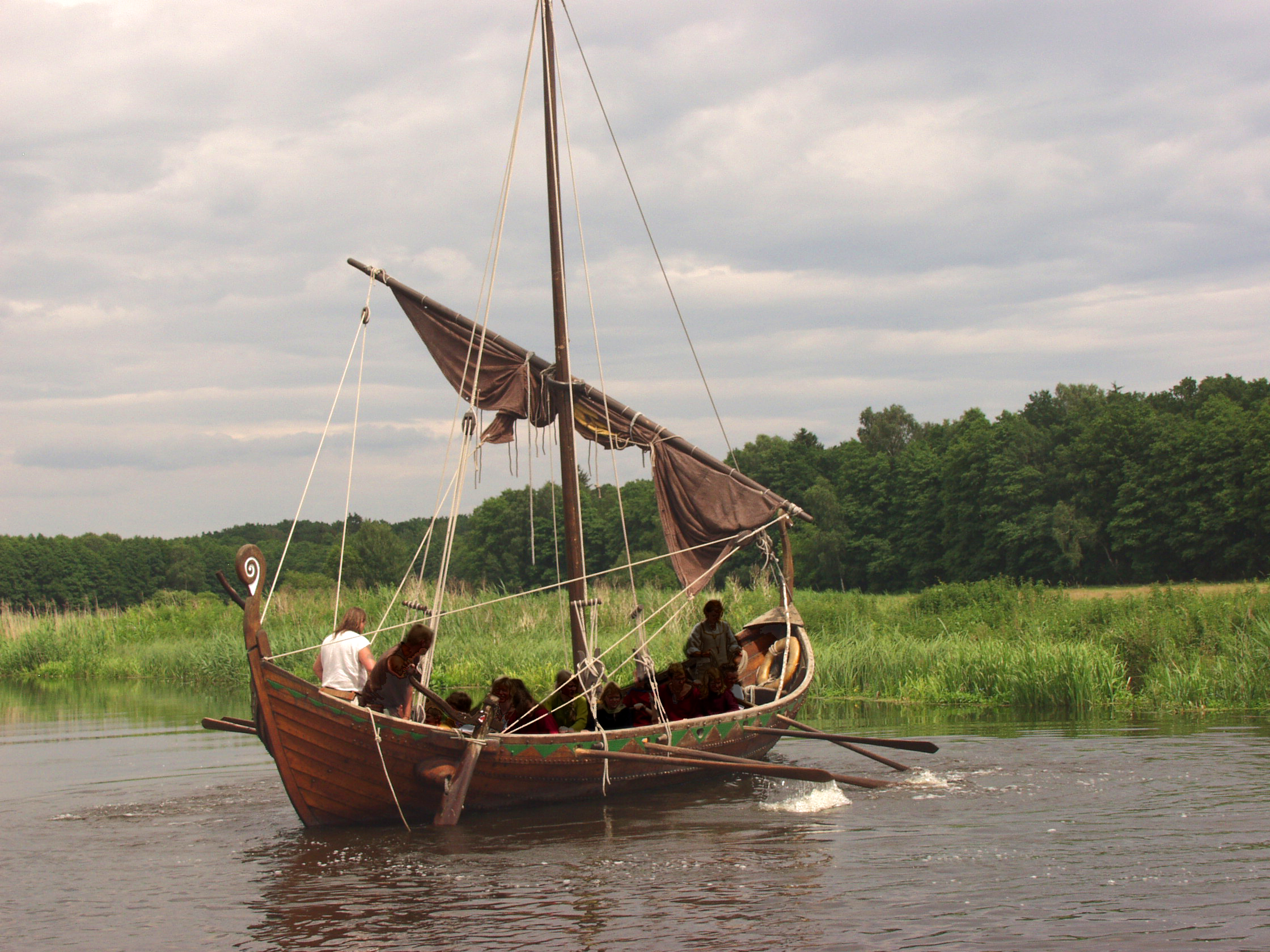
The early Middle Age Slavic ship "Svantevit"

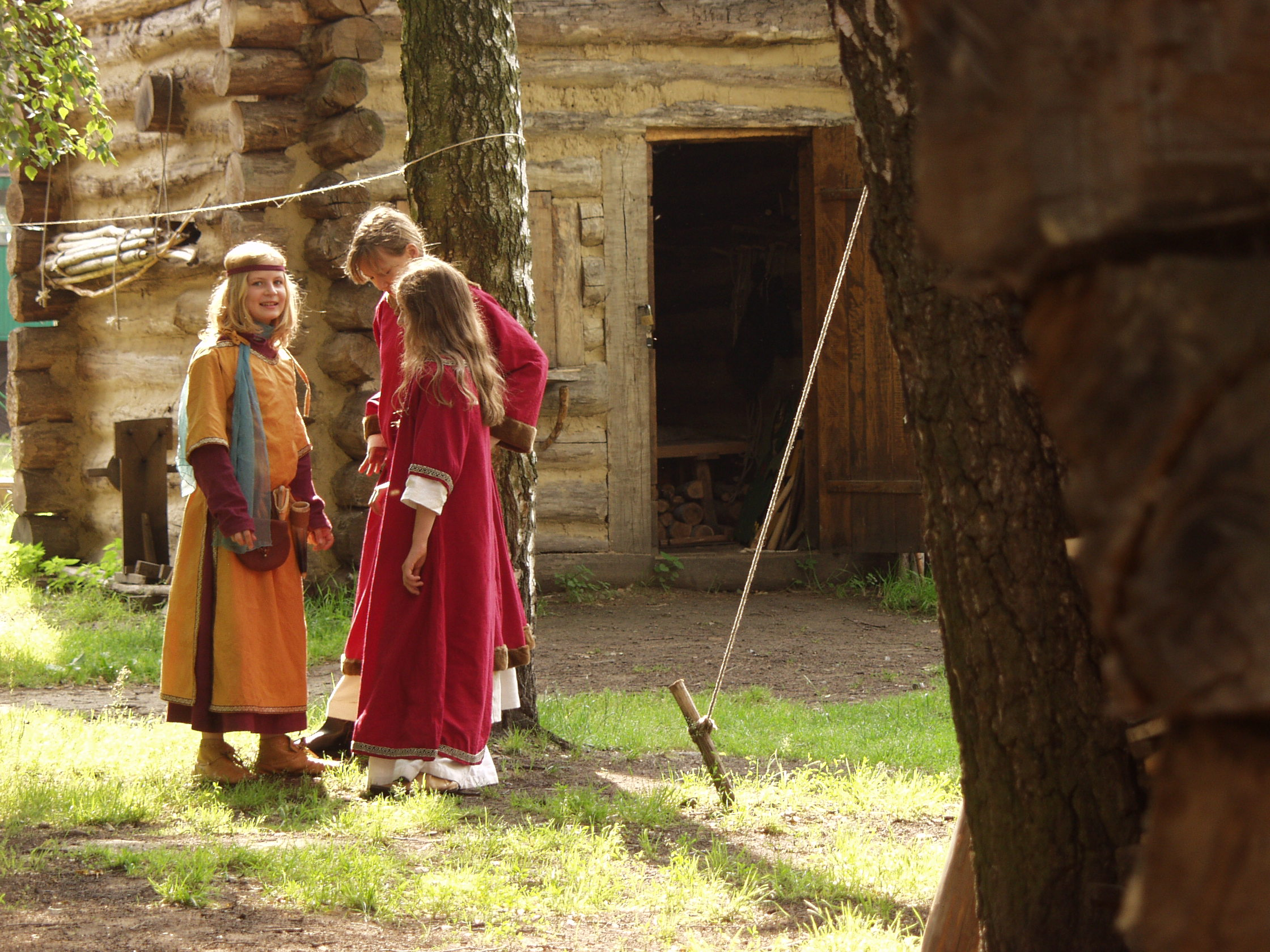
In Castrum Turglowe

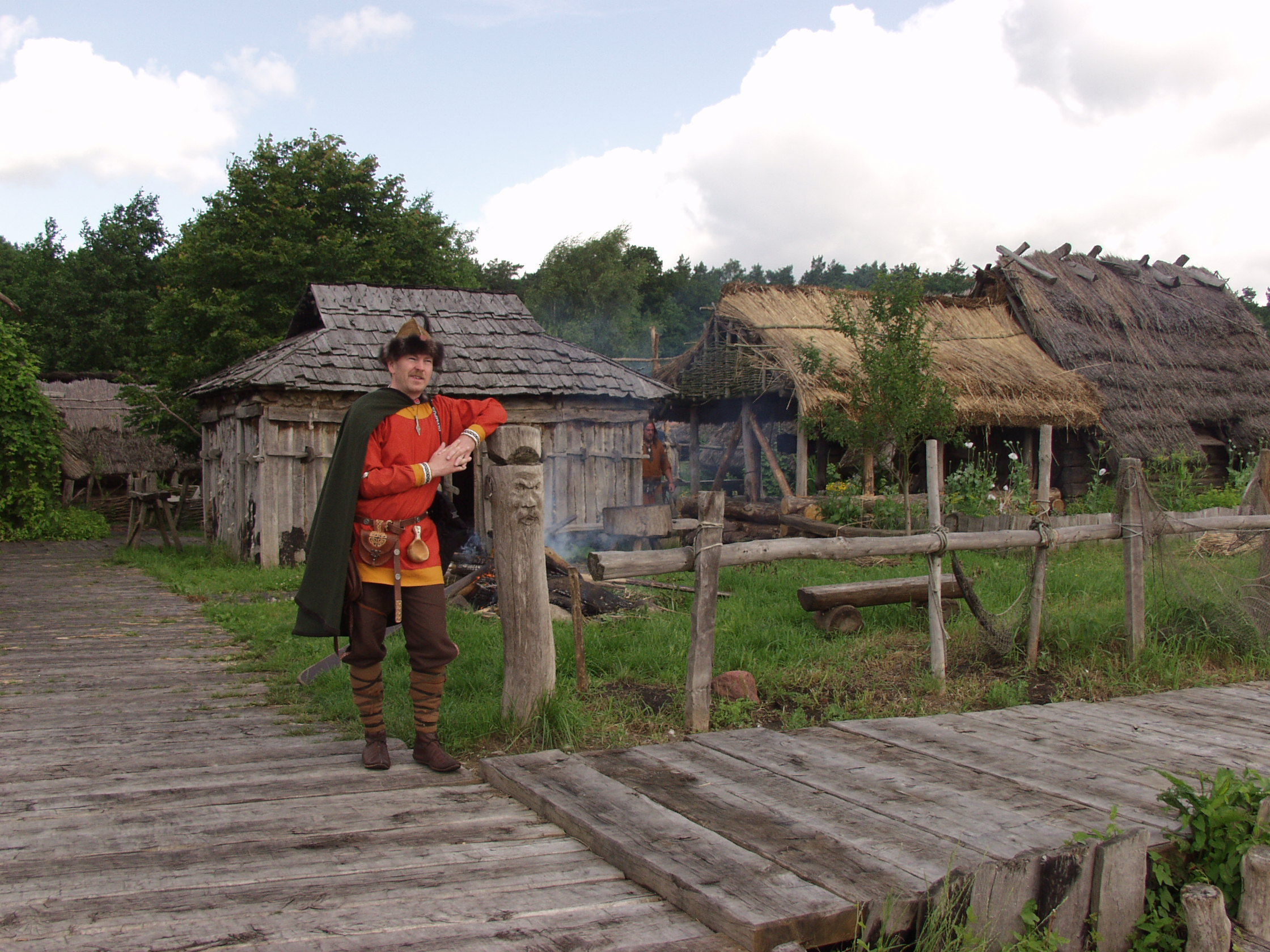
The Franks' visit

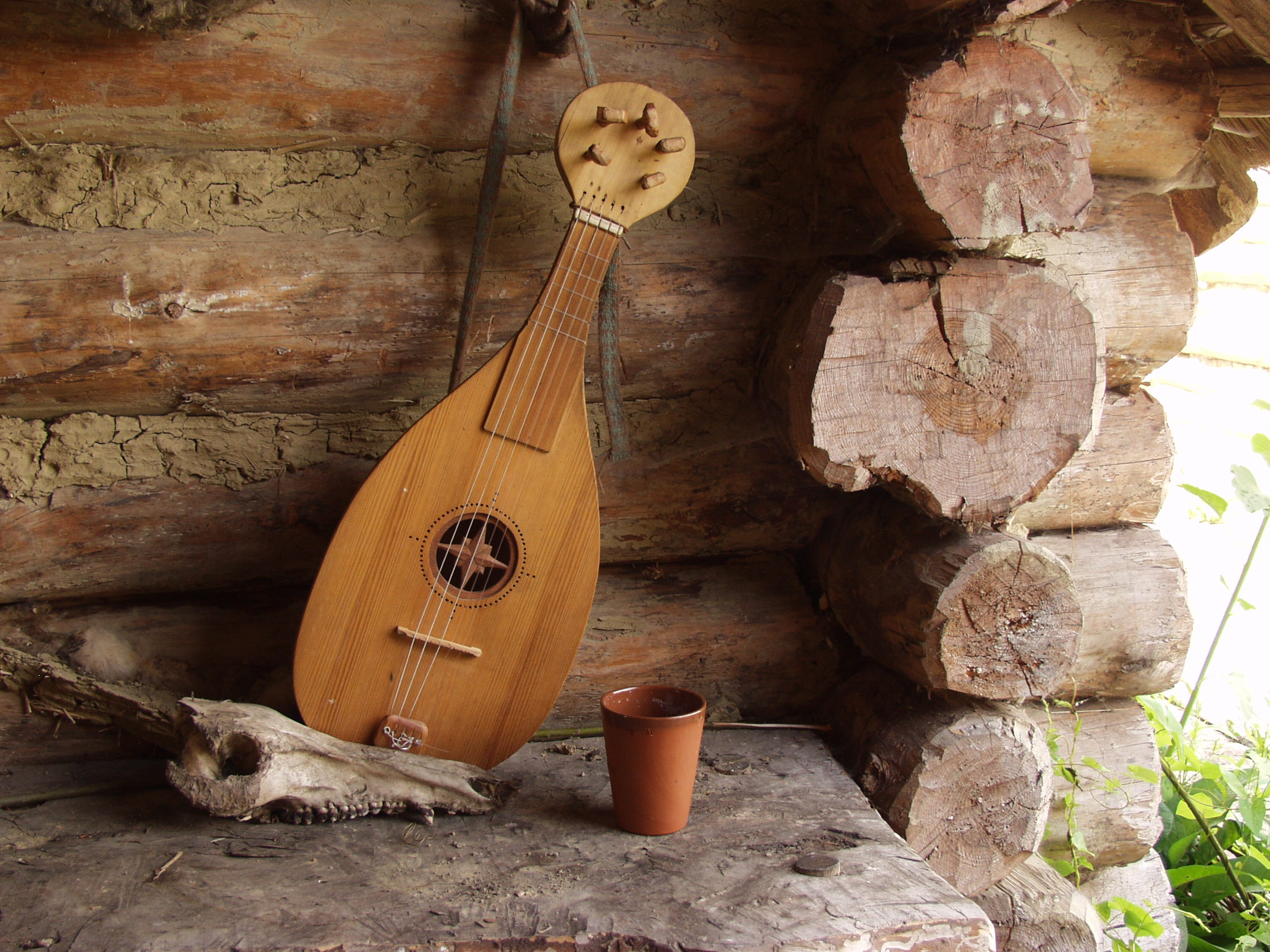
Still life

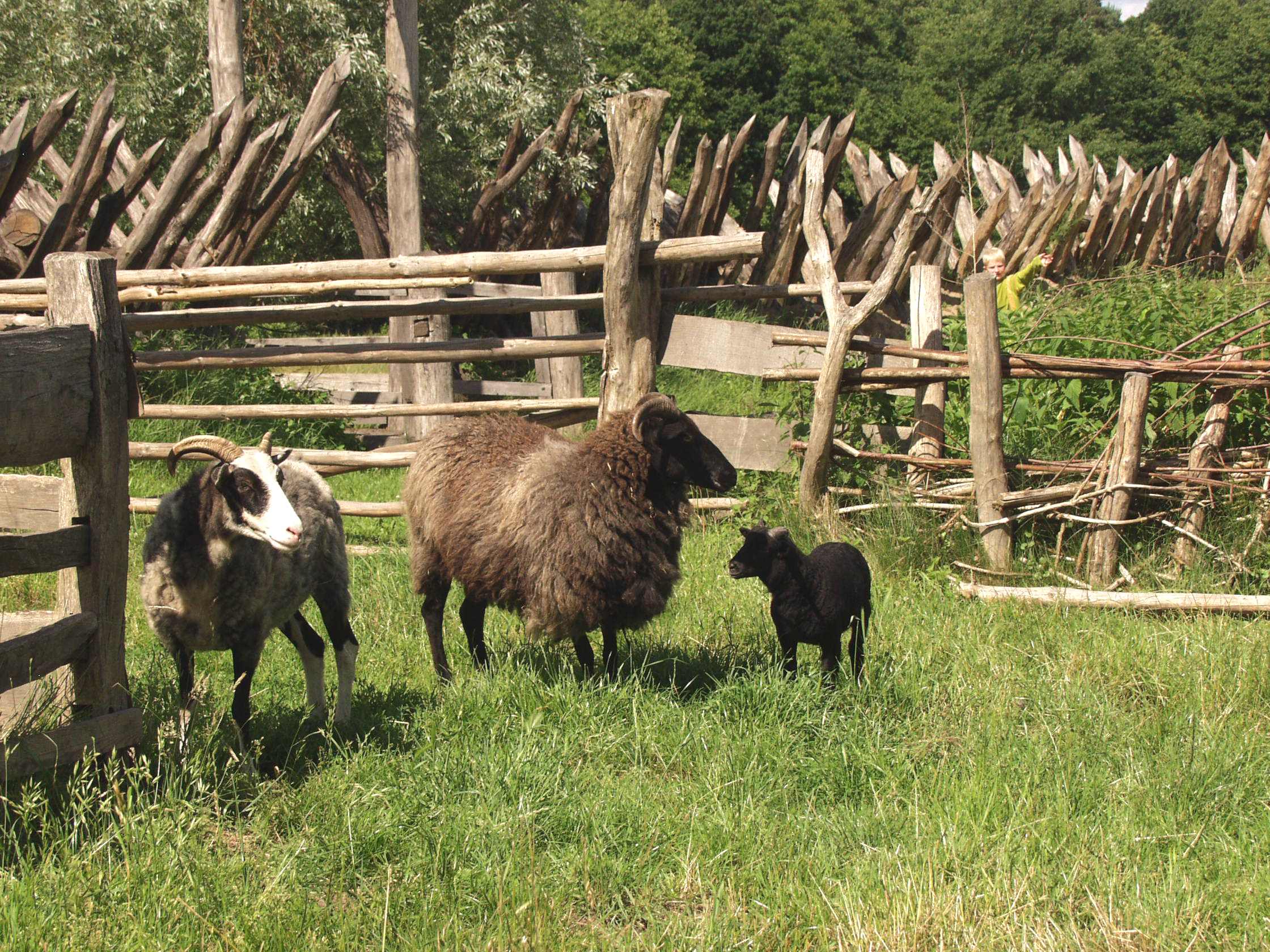
A flock of sheep

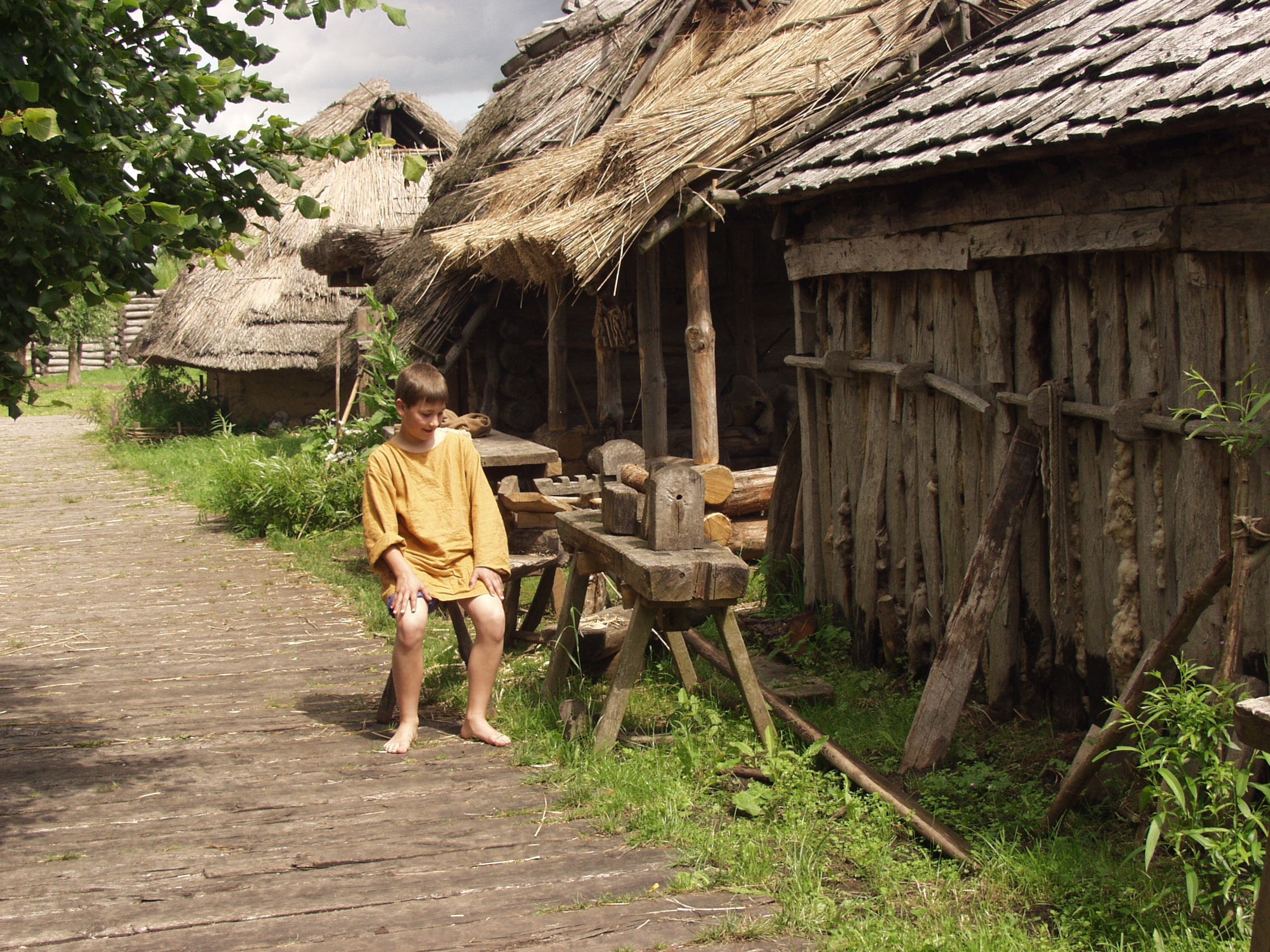
In Ukranenland

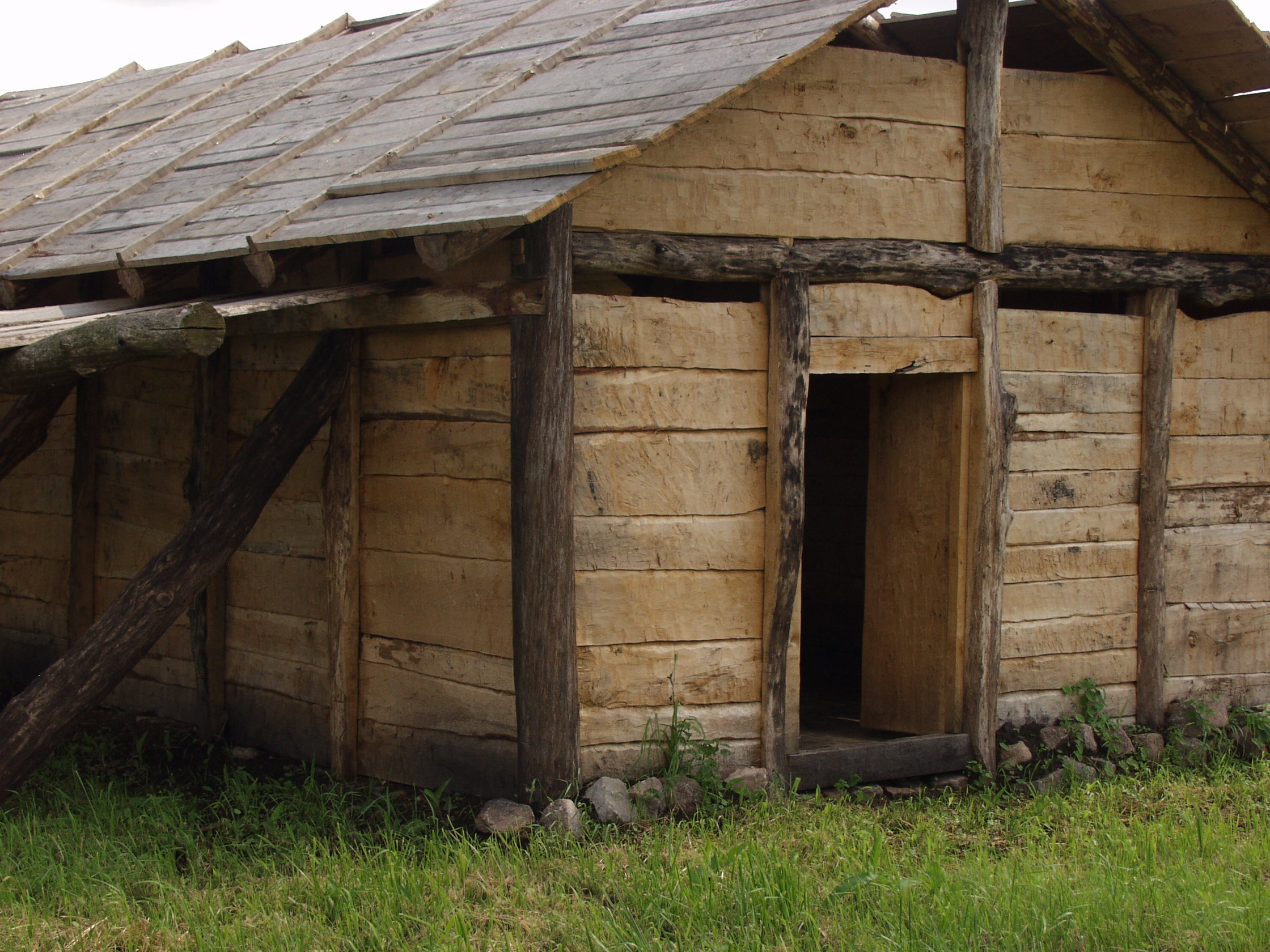
Incomplete huts

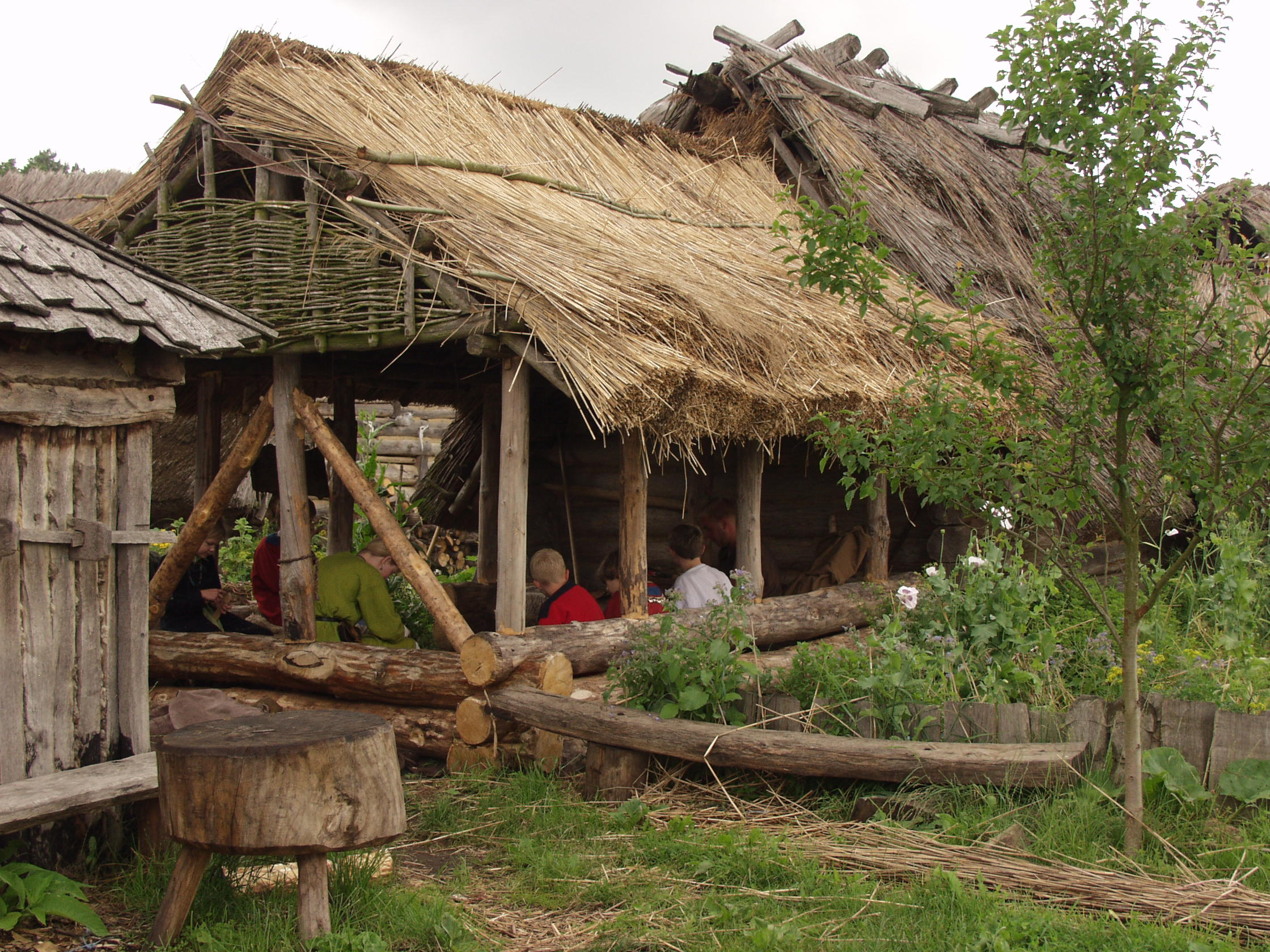
A house of a spoon carver

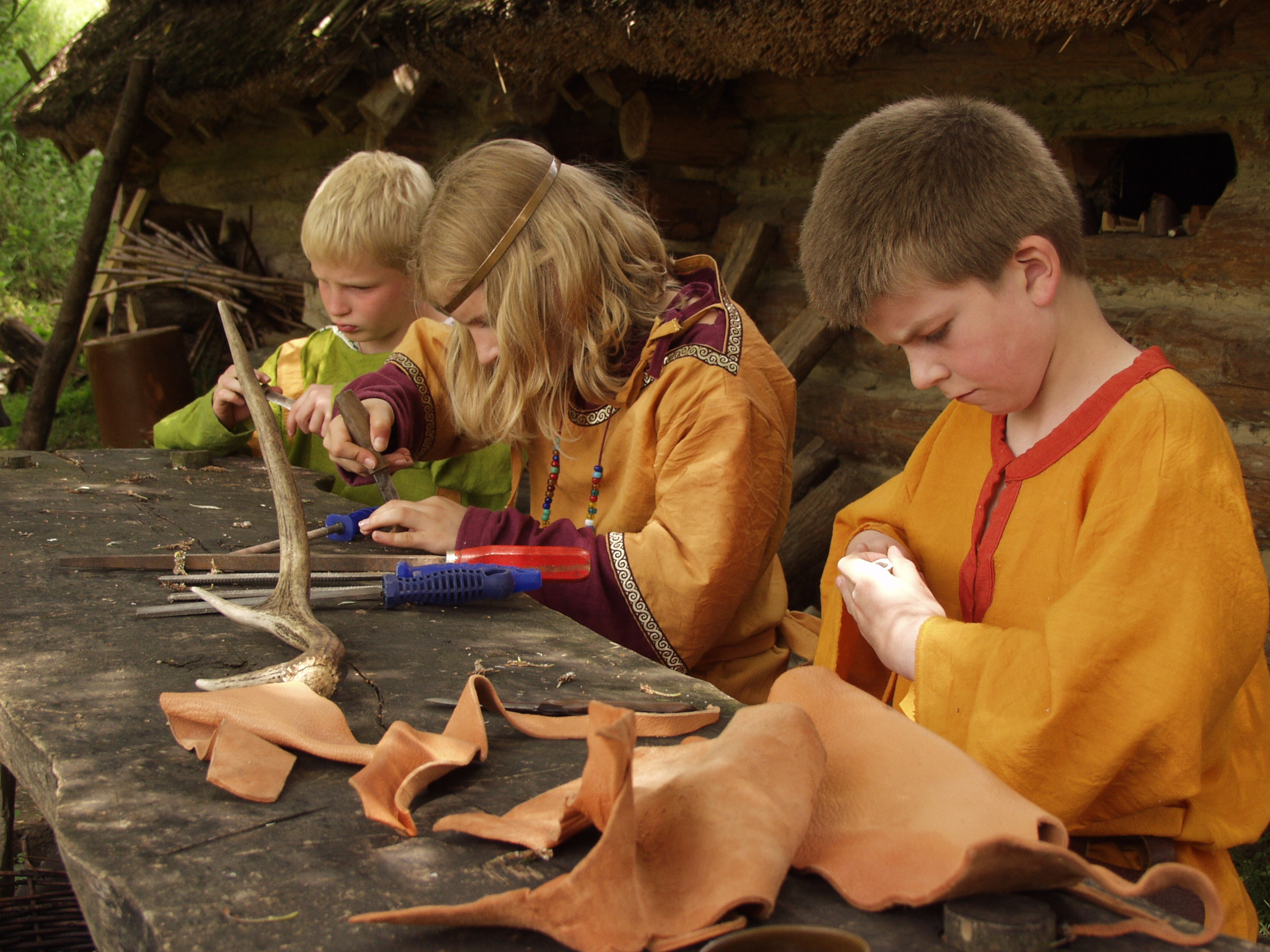
Bone carving

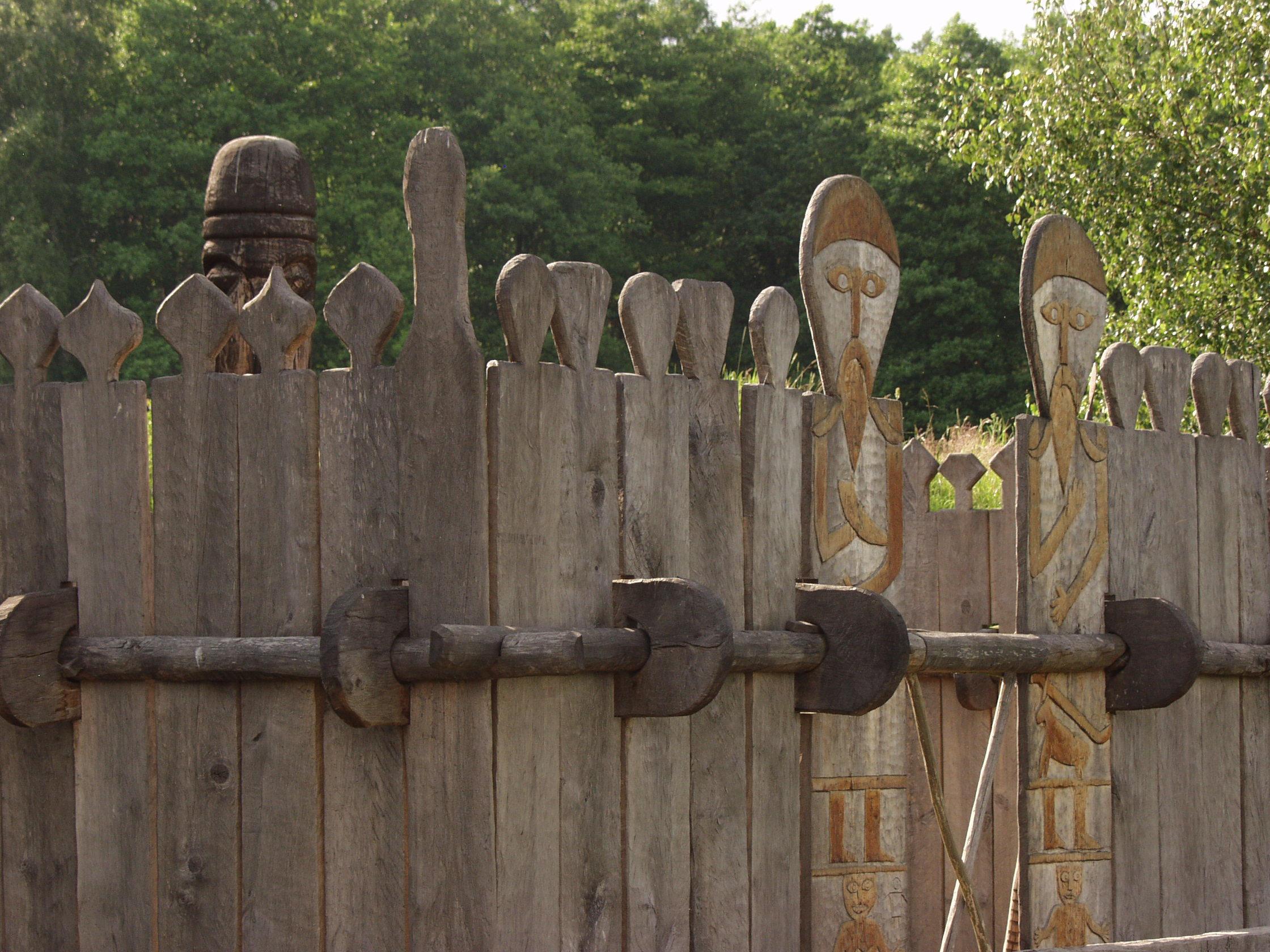
A temple of gods

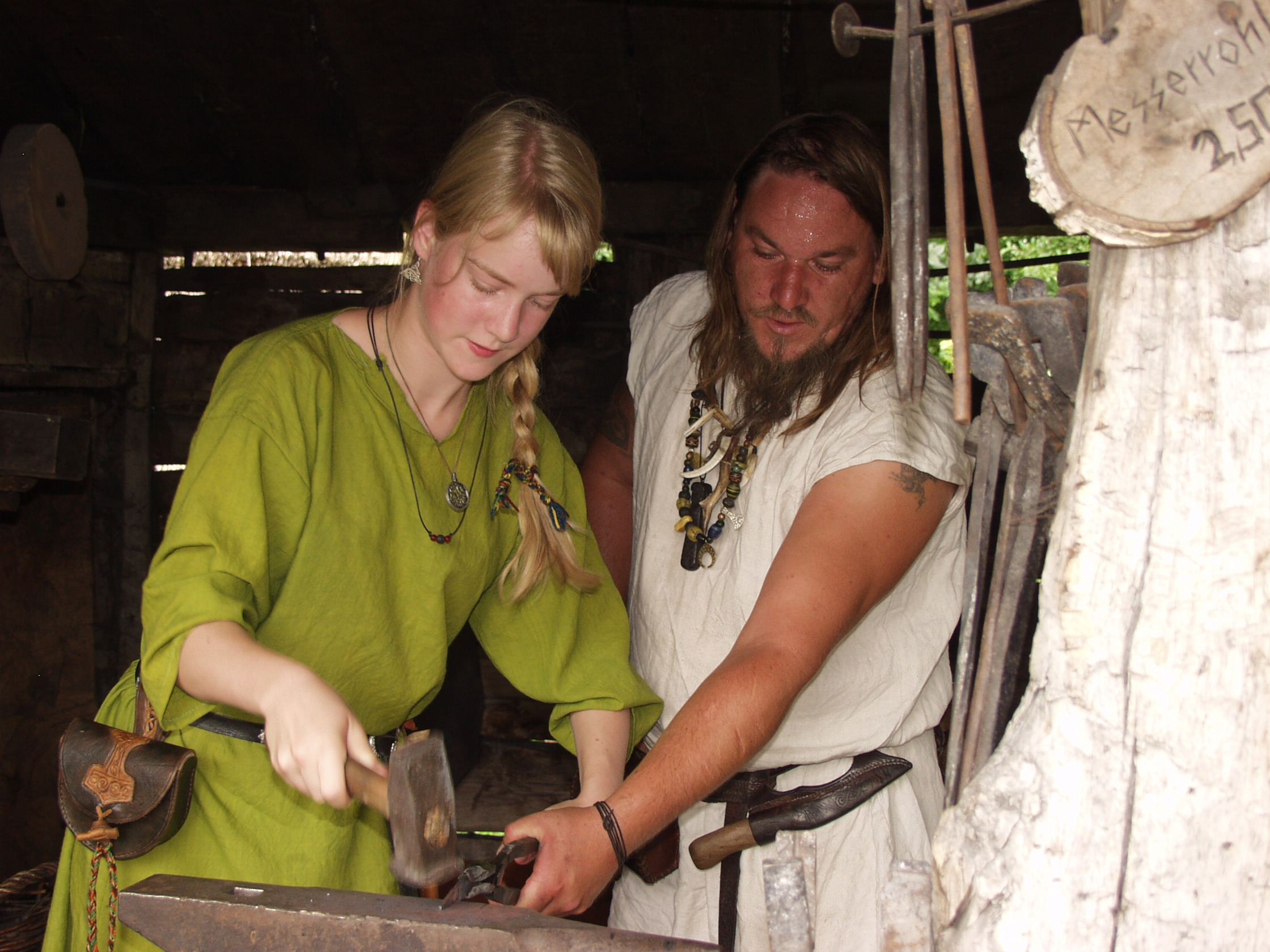
Forging

== See also ==
- Uckermark
- Ukrani
