= Prissani =

West Slavic tribe

The Prissani (Polish: Pyrzyczanie) were a medieval tribe in Pomerania. They were first mentioned as "Prissani" with 70 civitas by the Bavarian Geographer, ca. 845. They are associated with the Pomeranians, and were based in the lower Oder region around the modern town of Pyrzyce (Pyritz). The mention in the Bavarian Geographer is the only written record referring to the tribe.

In the late 10th century, the Polish dukes Mieszko I and Bolesław I Chrobry subdued parts of Pomerania, but did not succeed to subdue the lower Oder region. In 1121/22, the Polish duke Bolesław III Wrymouth conquered the area along with the Duchy of Pomerania under Wartislaw I. The tribe was subsequently Christianized, missionary Otto of Bamberg celebrated the first mass baptism in Pyrzyce. A separate tribal identity, if upheld so far, vanished when it was integrated in the Duchy of Pomerania.

== See also ==
- List of Medieval Slavic tribes
- Pomerania during the Early Middle Ages
- Pomeranians (Slavic tribe)
- Veleti
- Velunzani
- Ukrani
