= Wolinians =

Lechitic tribe in the Early to High Middle Ages

The Wolinians (Latin: Velunzani, Uelunzani, Polish: Wolinianie) were a Lechitic tribe in Early Middle Age Pomerania. They were first mentioned as "Velunzani" with 70 civitates by the Bavarian Geographer, ca. 845. Associated with both the Veleti (later Lutici) and the Pomeranians, they were based on the island of Wolin and the adjacent mainland. Compared to other tribes of these groups, the Wolinians' territory was relatively small but densely settled: in the 11th century, there was one settlement per four square kilometers. The Wolinians are described by Jan Maria Piskorski as the most powerful Pomeranian tribe. This position resulted from the multi-ethnic emporium at the site of the present-day town of Wolin (Wollin), then known as Jomsborg, Jumne, Julin or Vineta.

In the late 10th century, the Polish dukes Mieszko I and Bolesław I Chrobry subdued parts of Pomerania and also fought the Wolinians. Much of Wolin was destroyed in 1043 by Dano-Norwegian King Magnus the Good, who however failed to conquer its center. Also in the mid-11th century, export and wealth were greatly reduced, in part due to the breakdown of the Polish market. Yet the Wolinians retained their independence and continued to house refugees from the Danish opposition, causing Danish king Erik I Evergood to mount another campaign in 1098.

In 1121/22, the Polish duke Bolesław III Wrymouth conquered the area along with the Duchy of Pomerania under Wartislaw I. The inhabitants were subsequently Christianized, and lost their tribal identity when they were integrated into the Duchy of Pomerania. In 1173 and 1184, Wolin was finally destroyed by subsequent Danish campaigns, all of Pomerania was under Danish suzerainty for the next decades.

Today, the Wolinians together with the Polans and other Lechitic tribes, are regarded as one of the main tribes settled in an area of modern Poland.

== See also ==
- List of Medieval Slavic tribes
- Pomerania during the Early Middle Ages
- Pomeranians (Slavic tribe)
- Veleti
- Prissani
- Jomsvikings
- Niedamir
