= Dragovit =

Pagan ruler of the Veleti

Dragovit (Latin: Drogoviz; German: Dragowit; Polish: Drogowit; died in 810;) was a pagan ruler (prince or chief) of the Veleti (Latin: rex Wiltorum; "king of the Wiltzes"). It is thought that Dragovit began his rule c. 740.

Because of their constant hatred and hostility toward the Franks, in the late 8th century, Frankish king Charlemagne organised campaigns against the Veleti, and fellow Slavic tribe of the Linonen. With the aid of Frisian, Obodrite, (Note: Obodrites are also of Slavic stock) Saxon and Sorbian (Note: Sorbs are also of Slavic stock) reinforcements, Charlemagne managed to cross the Elbe River, advancing toward the Havel River into Veleti territory. Outnumbered, Dragovit, in 789, was forced to pledge loyalty to the Franks and surrender hostages. Among others, Dragovit was also forced to pay a tribute and accept the influence of Christian missionaries among his people.

His capital was a fortification known as civitas Dragowiti (City of Dragovit). Its location is hypothesised to be either at Brandenburg an der Havel or Demmin.
