= Wichmann the Younger =

Saxon noble (c.930–967)

Wichmann II the Younger (also spelled Wigmann or Wichman) (about 930 – 22 September 967) was a member of the Saxon House of Billung. He was a son of Count Wichmann the Elder and his wife Frederuna. The cousin of Emperor Otto I became known as a fierce enemy of the ruling Ottonian dynasty.

Wichmann was born at present-day Wichmannsburg, part of Bienenbüttel, at the residence of his father. Wichmann I the Elder, though the first-born of three Billung brothers and by his marriage related to King Otto I, was ignored at the enfeoffment with the Saxon Billung March, which in 936 fell to his younger brother Hermann. Wichmann the Elder at first rebelled against the king, joining the uprising of Duke Eberhard of Franconia, but gave up soon afterwards. Upon his father's death in 944, Wichmann the Younger remained under the tutelage of his uncle Hermann. When he came of age, he was only able to succeed to the rank of a count in Angria, though his county is unknown.

Raised at the court of King Otto I upon the early death of their mother, Wichmann made friends with the king's son Liudolf, duke of Swabia since 950. In 953, he participated in Liudolf's rebellion against King Otto, fighting the Saxon troops during the king's siege of Mainz, whereby he re-opened his father's feud with Hermann, his uncle, who meanwhile had been appointed princeps of Saxony. Wichmann was captured; Otto prevented him from being punished more severely, contrary to Hermann's wishes. He was released in 954, though he was not included in the general settlement that followed the revolt.

Wichmann and his brother Egbert the One-Eyed, still feeling deprived of their heritage, marauded through Saxony and in 955 arrived in the lands of the Slavic Obotrites at Liubice (Lübeck), where they instigated a revolt under Prince Nako that was suppressed by King Otto at the Battle of Recknitz. The young Billungs fled to the court of Duke Hugh the Great of France. When Hugh died the next year, Wichmann had to return to Germany; he was pardoned after he had sworn loyalty to King Otto. He remained an implacable opponent, attacking the lands of his uncle Hermann several times, until he had to retreat to the Slavic Lutici territories, where he was tolerated by Margrave Gero.

In 963, Wichmann was an outlaw leading a band of West Slavs (likely Pomeranians) in battle against Duke Mieszko I of Poland, defeating him twice and even exacting tribute. For a brief interlude, he was allowed to return to Germany and his wife's estates, but he was exiled once more by his uncle Hermann during Otto's second Italian campaign. In 967, he and the western Pomeranians were defeated at Wolin by an alliance of Mieszko and Duke Boleslaus I of Bohemia and Wichmann was killed in action. Wichmann's lands were confiscated by Otto and divided in two, half going to the monastery of Saint Michael founded by Hermann Billung at Lüneburg, and half going to found the convent of Keminada (near Bodenwerder) on the Weser.

== Marriage and issue ==
According to the Res gestae saxonicae, Wichmann was married. Certain scholars have interpreted a clause in the foundation charter of the Corvey Abbey as referring to Wichmann, his wife Hathwig, and his son Amelung, Count of Bikethop. Wichmann's daughters Imma and Frederuna were allowed to use their inheritance, on which Keminada was founded, throughout their lifetime.

== Sources ==
- Reuter, Timothy. Germany in the Early Middle Ages 800–1056. New York: Longman, 1991.
- Bernhardt, John W. Itinerant Kingship and Royal Monasteries in Early Medieval Germany, c. 936–1075. Cambridge: Cambridge University Press, 1993.
