= Veleti =

Lehitic ethnic group that formed around the 6th century

Confederation of the Veleti
- 8th century–10th century
- Map of the important tribes and settlements of Veleti, around year 1000.
- Status: Independent confederation of Polabian Slavic tribes
- Capital: none or unknown
- Common languages: Polabian Slavic
- Religion: Polabian (Note: Compared to the original old Slavic religion, the pagan religion of Polabian Slavs was "reformed" (improved) by wooden temples and priesthood as a high social class with political influence. Almost every Polabian tribe had its own pagan cult of a deity of military function or some version of the supreme god, whose high priests had sometimes military retinue and were equal to the chiefs or politically stronger. This made their pagan cults more organized and the Polabian Slavs more resistant to Christianization than other Slavic peoples who had less organized paganism and which was practiced as a folk religion. It also caused the creation of local theocracies.) Slavic paganism, the known major cults: Svarozhich/Radegast in Rethra-Radgosc; Triglav in Brennabor; Gerovit in Havelberg; Rugiewit with Porenut and Porewit in Charenza, Rügen; Svetovit in Arkona, Rügen; Chernoglav in Jasmund, Rügen; folk polytheism of minor cults (unnamed twins gods near Tollensesee etc); Chernobog according to Helmold
- Government: Confederal monarchy (Principality)
- Prince
- History
  - Formed: 8th century
  - Collapse of Veletian central rule: 789
  - Veleti tribes reorganized to the Lutician federation: 10th century
Preceded by	Succeeded by
Polabian Slavs	Lutician federation
- Today part of: Germany

The Veleti, (Note: German: Wilzen, Wilsen, Wilciken, Welataben; Polish: Wieleci, Wieletowie, Wilcy) also known as Veletians, Wilzi, Wielzians, and Wiltzes, were a group of medieval Lechitic tribes within the territory of Western Pomerania, related to Polabian Slavs. They had formed together the Confederation of the Veleti, also known as the Union of the Veleti, (Note: German: Wilzener Bund; Polish: Związek Wielecki) a loose monarchic confederation of the tribes. Said state existed between the 6th and 10th centuries, after which, it was succeeded by the Lutician Federation.

== Name ==
The name Veleti stems from the root vel- ('high, tall'). The Veleti were called by other names, probably given by their neighbours, such as Lutices, Ljutici, or Volki, Volčki. The latter means 'wolf', and the former probably 'fierce creature' based upon the comparison with the belarusian definition lyutyj zvěr. In common with other Slavic groups between the Elbe and Oder Rivers, they were often described by Germanic sources as Wends. In the late 10th century, they were continued by the Lutici. In Einhard's Vita Karoli Magni, the Wilzi are said to refer to themselves as Welatabians.

== Veleti tribes ==
The first mention of a tribe named Veltae is found in Ptolemy's second-century Geography, Book III, chapter V: "Back from the Ocean, near the Venedicus Bay [Baltic Sea], the Veltae dwell, above whom are the Ossi." The Bavarian Geographer's anonymous medieval document compiled in Regensburg in 830 contains a list of the tribes in Central Europe east of the Elbe. Among other tribes it also lists the Uuilci (Veleti), featuring 95 civitates.

The Veleti did not remain a unified tribe for long: local tribes developed, the most important being: the Kissini (Kessiner, Chizzinen, Kyzziner) along the lower Warnow and Rostock, named after their capital Kessin; the Circipani (Zirzipanen) along the Trebel and Peene Rivers, with their capital believed to be Teterow and strongholds in Demmin and probably even Güstrow; the Tollenser east and south of the Peene along the Tollense River; and the Redarier south and east of the Tollensesee on the upper Havel. The Hevelli living in the Havel area and, though more unlikely, the Rujanes of Rugia might once have been part of the Veletians. Even the Leitha region of Lower Austria may have been named for a tribe of Veleti, the Leithi.

This political splitting of the Veleti probably occurred due to the size of the inhabited area, with settlements grouped around rivers and forts and separated by large strips of woodlands. Also, the Veletian king Dragowit had been defeated and made a vassal by Charlemagne in the only expedition into Slavic territory led by Charlemagne himself, in 789, causing the central Veletian rule to collapse. The Veleti were invaded by the Franks during their continuous expeditions into Obodrite lands, with the Obodrites being allies of the Franks against the Saxons. Einhard made these claims in "Vita Karoli Magni" (Life of Charles the Great), a biography of Charlemagne, King of the Franks.

After the 10th century, the Veleti disappeared from written records, and were replaced by the Lutici who at least in part continued the Veleti tradition.

== Known leaders ==
- Dragovit (c. 740–810)
- Liub (810–823)
- Milegast (823–823)
- Cealadragus (823–?)

== See also ==
- Pomerania during the Early Middle Ages
- List of Medieval Slavic tribes

== Bibliography ==
- Christiansen, Erik (1997). The Northern Crusades. London: Penguin Books. p. 287. ISBN 0-14-026653-4.
- Herrmann, Joachim (1970). Die Slawen in Deutschland (in German). Berlin: Akademie-Verlag GmbH.
