= Zhrets =

Priest in Slavic religion

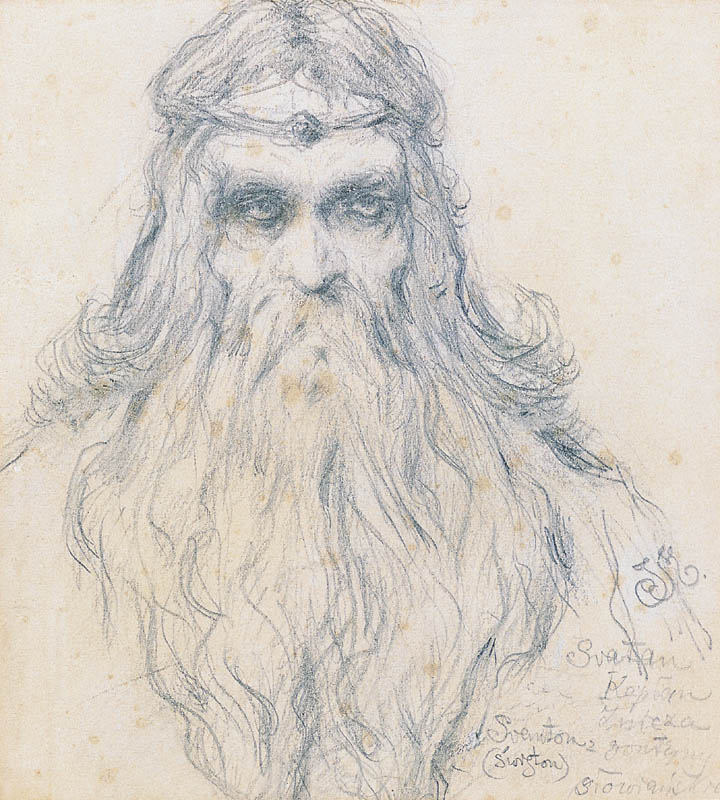
Slavic priest of fire, Jan Matejko, ca. 1870

A zhrets (Note: Scientific transliteration: žrec; Russian: жрец [ʐrʲets]; Ukrainian: жрець [ˈʒrɛtsʲ]; Polish: żerca [ˈʐɛrt͡sa].) is a priest in the Slavic religion whose name is reconstructed to mean "one who makes sacrifices". The name appears mainly in the East and South Slavic vocabulary, while in the West Slavs it is attested only in Polish. Most information about the Slavic priesthood comes from Latin texts about the paganism of the Polabian Slavs. The descriptions show that they were engaged in offering sacrifices to the gods, divination and determining the dates of festivals. They possessed cosmological knowledge and were a major source of resistance against Christianity.

== Etymology ==
The earliest attestation of the word is Old Church Slavonic жьрьць žĭrĭcĭ "priest". In other Slavic languages it occurs as Russian жрец zhrets, Belarusian жрэц zhrets, and Ukrainian жрець zhrets, all derived from Old East Slavic жрецъ žrecŭ, and Bulgarian and Macedonian жрец zhrets and Slovene žréc and all meaning "pagan priest". Czech žrec was borrowed from Old East Slavic, (Note: The Czech words žrec and žertva appearing in Mater Verborum are a forgery by Václav Hanka (Urbańczyk 1948).) as was Croatian žrec zhrets. The exception here is the Polish attestation żerca, which historically means "matchmaker". The Proto-Slavic form is reconstructed as *žьrьcь, which is an agent noun from the verb *žьrti "to consecrate, sacrifice", which is continued by OCS жрьти, жрѣти žrěti and Old East Slavic жерети žereti and it literally means "one who makes sacrifices". This verb is derived from the Proto-Indo-European root *gʷerH- "to praise" and is cognate to Lithuanian gìrt, Latvian dzir̃t, Old Prussian girtwei, Sanskrit गृणाति gṛṇā́ti "to praise", or Latin grātēs "gratitude". From this verb is also derived *žьrtva "sacrifice" continued by OCS жрьтва, ⰶⱃⱐⱅⰲⰰ žrĭtva, (Note: Vasmer considered Russian же́ртва žertva to be a loan from Old Church Slavonic due to the occurrence of е instead of the expected ё (Vasmer 1986, p. 50).) and other related words.

In Old Polish, zhrets appears in the forms żyrzec, żerzec, żyrca, żerca since the early 15th century to the 16th century in Polish translations of the New Testament (Note: It generally refers to the matchmaker at Cana of Galilee (Urbańczyk 1948).) as the equivalent of the Latin word architriclinus and means "matchmaker"; later it appears only in dictionaries, where it appears as a synonym of the Latin words pronubus and paranymphus, and the Polish swat, dziewosłąb, hochmistrz, marszałek weselny. In only one attestation word żyrcowie (plural from żyrca) was used to call all wedding guests. (Note: A similar shift in meaning from first person to all wedding guests has also occurred in the word swat → swatowie (Urbańczyk 1948).) In addition to these words, Samuel Linde's Dictionary also mentions the words żerecki from Budny, żertownik "sacrificial table" in tserkov from Pimina and Sakowicz, żertwa or żertwa and żertować, however, these words are considered to be loanwords from the Old Church Slavonic. For this reason, however, the word żyrzec should not be considered a borrowing from OCS, since in OCS texts the Latin word architriclinus was Slavicized as architriklinĭ or replaced by another word. In contrast to words in East Slavic languages, Polish words never meant "priest" but "matchmaker", which is explained by the fact that pagan priests, in addition to offering sacrifices to the gods, were also engaged in matchmaking. Marriage was out of the control of the Christian Churches for a long time and they used severe punishments before they were able to force church weddings on people. Research into the history of Polish marriages also suggests that the matchmaker had priestly qualities.

The basic form of the Polish word is considered to be żyrzec, because it is the oldest and most frequent, although on the basis of the Old Church Slavonic form žĭrĭcĭ one should expect the form żrzec, żerca. For this reason, Jan Łoś included this word in the group of words łyżka, dźwirze, chrzybiet, where ь was lengthened to i. The disruption of the word development may also have been caused by the words i.e. żyr, pożyrać "to devour": żerca turned into żyrca, and then when in all Polish words -ir- and -yr- turned into -er-, żerzec and żerca were formed.

== Description and functions ==
=== Genesis ===
The main informations on the Slavic priesthood concerns the priesthood of the Polabian Slavs. The genesis of the developed Polabian priesthood is unclear: Kazimierz Wachowski attributed to the rulers of the Veleti (Lutici) tribe the simultaneous position of high priests, and Leszek Paweł Słupecki, who expresses a similar view, adds that originally the prince-priest combined the spheres of sacrum and profanum, which later, among the Veleti, was separated. Many other researchers point to the connections between chieftainship and priesthood. Henryk Łowmiański expressed a different stance – he believed that the development of the West Slavic religion in the main points was modeled on Christianity. Ultimately, however, these views are speculation, because medieval sources do not indicate how the selection of priests proceeded.

=== Polabian Slavs ===
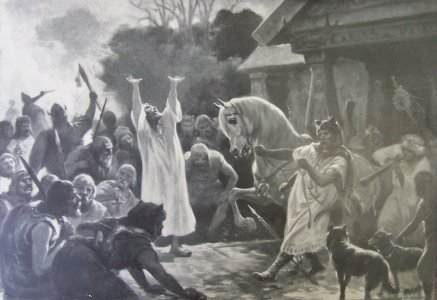
Divination before the battle, Józef Ryszkiewicz, 1890

Priests, unlike most Slavic men, had long hair and beards and wore long robes.

According to the descriptions, the Polabian priests were mainly engaged in divination. They divined mainly with the help of horses: Saxo Grammaticus states that among the Rani, a horse was led three times between a series of lances driven into the ground at an angle and connected to each other, and if the horse started walking with its right leg each time, it meant a good omen. According to Thietmar a similar divination, only in two stages, was carried out in Rethra, and Herbord describes that among the Pomeranians a priest led an armed horse three or four times over nine spears, and if the horse did not touch the lance with its foot, it meant a good omen. Henry of Latvia describes how the Slavs wanted to sacrifice a monk to the gods – whether the pagans should do so was to be decided by the behavior of the horse, and the end of the matter was to leave the monk alive, which clearly indicates the unpredictability of the oracle. The ruler of fate here is supposed to be the god, the horse is merely the transmitter, and the priest is the executor of the oracle.

Helmold described in his Chronicle that in the grove of the god Proue every Monday the people, the knyaz and the priest gathered to dispense justice. The main, separate part of the grove was only accessible to the priest, people who wanted to make a sacrifice, or people who were in danger. Saxo also describes that the horn, which was attached to the idol of Svetovit in Arkona, was also used by the priests for divination. Saxo also describes the ritual celebrated after the harvest: at the climax a large sacrificial kalach was brought, the size of which was similar to that of a man, which the priest placed between himself and the people gathered in front of the temple and asked "do you see me?", and when the answer was affirmative he said: "may you not be able to see me next year", which was supposed to be a wish for a more abundant harvest next year. Aleksander Gieysztor connected this Polabian ritual to an identical one performed by an Orthodox priest in Bulgaria.

The priests also knew cosmology (the priests of Szczecin explained the tripartite nature of the cosmos), determined the dates of holidays, and were a major source of resistance to Christianity.

=== Other Slavic peoples ===
Information about the Slavic priesthood concerning West Slavs outside the Polabian group, as well as East Slavs or South Slavs, is more scarce. In Old East Slavic texts, the role of priest-charmers is often played by Volkhvs.

== Political power ==
=== Veleti ===
The Lutici, the confederation of Redarians, Circipanians, Kessinians, and Tollensians, inhabited a wide area around the river Peene. From Thietmar's description of the system of this confederation, it can be inferred that the confederation had no centralized authority, no king or knyaz was recognized, and decisions were made collectively in assemblies. The lack of monarchical leadership may have led to the increased influence of the priests. According to Bernhard Guttmann, the political importance of the priesthood was influenced by the principle of unity among the priests of Rethra, which also gave it important political significance. The German historian Wolfgang H. Fritze also notes the significant role of the priests in politics, but points out that power was not constitutionally in the hands of the priests of Rethra. On the other hand, according to the Czech historian Libuša Hrabová, the priests of Rethra gained in importance as a result of Christian pressure, and the town of Rethra itself gained almost princely power, above all in matters of foreign policy. The historian Roderich Schmidt also adds that the uprising of the Polabian Slavs in 983 began with a gathering at Rethra and that the victory celebrations from the 1066 uprising were held there. Another historian, Joachim Herrmann, who also referred to these two events expressed the view that no war would have taken place without the initiative and consent of the priests and sees in the Lutici covenant a secret alliance organized by the priests of Rethra, while Manfred Hellmann took the opposite view and believed that the priesthood gained importance only after the victory of the uprising, as a result of which the Slavic people recognized the superiority of the Slavic gods over the Christian one. According to Anthony D. Smith, who divided societies into lateral (lateral-aristocratic), which are open and dynamic, and vertical (vertical-democratic), which emphasize their ethnic ties and separate themselves from the world, the Lutici should be assigned to the vertical group, and this community was created by experiencing wars together. The verticality of the tribe leads to the rejection of religious syncretism, cultural assimilation and exogamy. Typical of such societies is the existence of a specialized priestly class. This view is supported by Christian Lübke.

=== Rani ===
The main sources of information about the priesthood of the Rani are Saxo Grammaticus' Gesta Danorum and Helmold's Chronica Slavorum. In the case of this tribe, scholars point even more strongly than in the case of the Veleti to the dominant role of priests in society and politics. They generally point to Helmold's information that the Rani were the only Slavic tribe to have a king, but his authority was weak compared to that of the priest, or Saxo's information that the priests of Svetovit had 300 horses and as many horsemen. According to Sven Wichert, such a categorical interpretation is biased because most scholars in general overlook Helmold's first information about the priesthood, where, according to him, the king and the priest had an equal position. It also points to the fact that Saxo does not mention the role of priests during the negotiations after the surrender of Arkona to the Danes. More moderate views were propounded, for example, by Manfred Hellmann, who recognized the coexistence of princely and priestly power. Joachim Herrmann and Evamaria Engel, on the other hand, recognized that priests influenced political decisions with the help of oracles and their authority. They also point to a situation where a Rani priest, having seen that a Christian priest who had come with Saxon merchants to a market on Rügen was holding a Christian devotion there, summoned the king and the people and demanded the extradition of the Christian priest whom he wanted to sacrifice to the gods as reparation for promoting Christianity. This situation according to them proves that the priest had no executive power.

== See also ==
- Volkhv

== Bibliography ==
- Álvarez-Pedrosa, Juan Antonio (2021). Sources of Slavic Pre-Christian Religion. Leiden: Koninklijke Brill. ISBN 978-90-04-44138-5.
- Biloshtan, A. P.; Boyko, M. F.; Hradova, V. P.; Kolesnyk, H. M.; Petrovsʹka, O. P.; Yurchuk, L. A. (1971). "ЖРЕЦЬ" [Priest]. In Kostyantynovych, Bilodid Ivan; Dotsenko, P. P.; Yurchuk, L. A. (eds.). Словник української мови в 11 томах [Dictionary of Ukrainian Movies in 11 volumes]. Vol. 2. Наукова думка. p. 545.
- Derksen, Rick (2008). Etymological dictionary of the Slavic inherited lexicon. Leiden Indo-European Etymological Dictionary Series. Leiden: Brill. ISBN 978-900415504-6.
- Gieysztor, Aleksander (2006). Mitologia Słowian (in Polish). Warsaw: Wydawnictwa Uniwersytetu Warszawskiego. ISBN 978-83-235-0234-0.
- Martynau, Wiktar Uładzimierawicz (1985). "Жрэц". Этымалагічны слоўнік беларускай мовы (in Belarusian). Vol. 3. Minsk: Навука і тэхніка.
- Snoj, Marko (2016). "žrẹ̑c". Slovenski etimološki slovar (in Slovenian) (3rd ed.). Ljubljana: Založba ZRC. ISBN 978-961254886-5.
- Szyjewski, Andrzej (2003). Religia Słowian. Kraków: Wydawnictwo WAM. ISBN 83-7318-205-5.
- Urbańczyk, Stanisław (1948). "Przeżytek pogaństwa: stpol. żyrzec". Język Polski. 1948, (Maj/Czerwiec) (in Polish) (3). Polska Akademia Umiejętności (1919–1952). Komisja Języka Polskiego, Towarzystwo Miłośników Języka Polskiego: 68–72. ISSN 0021-6941.
- Vasmer, Max (1986). "жрец". Этимологический словарь русского языка (in Russian). Vol. 2. Translated by Trubachyov, Oleg (2nd ed.). Moscow: Progress.
- Wichert, Sven (2010). "Die politische Rolle der heidnischen Priester bei den Westslaven". Studia Mythologica Slavica (in German). 13: 33–42. doi:10.3986/sms.v13i0.1638. ISSN 1581-128X.
