= Dumar (prince) =

Historical Slavic prince

Dumar was a 12th-century Slavic prince and warrior in Western Pomerania. He was defeated while fighting against the raid organised by Lothair III, duke of Saxony, and Henry II, margrave of the Northern March in 1114. While it remains unknown from which tribe he came from, it is proposed that it could have been Kessinians, Pomeranians, Redari, or Tollensians.

== Biography ==
Dumar was described in writings of Annalista Saxo. According to them, he was Slavic prince and warrior in Western Pomerania, living at the beginning of the 12th century. He fought during the raid against the tribe of Lutici, organised by Lothair III, duke of Saxony, and Henry II, margrave of the Northern March in 1114. Following his defeat, he was forced to surrender his son as a hostage. A prince of Rani tribe attempted to help him, however he was also defeated.

It is unknown from which tribe Dumar came from. Some historians proposed that he was a prince of Kessinians, or a chief of Redari or Tollensians. Other propose that he could have came from a tribe of Pomeranians, living at the mouth of Oder river, and could have been the father of Wartislaw I, since, as a child, he was baptized while also being a captive of Saxons.
