= Radogost =

Radogost may refer to:

- Radogost (bishop) (12th century), Bosnian bishop
- Radogost (mythology), a theonym and epithet of Svarozhits
- Radogost (chieftain) (fl. 584–597), South Slavic chieftain also known as Ardagast
- A Slavic name meaning 'guest'

== See also ==
- Radagast
- Radogoszcz (disambiguation)
- Radegast (disambiguation)
