= Lutici =

10th to 12th century federation of West Slavic tribes

Lutician Federation
- 10th century–1168
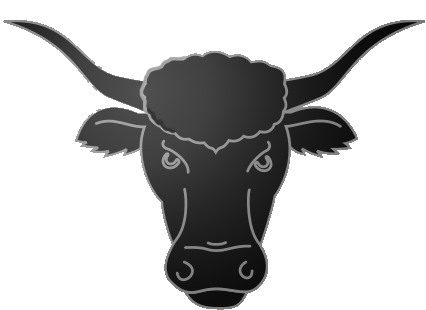
- A black bull's head, the symbol supposedly associated with the Redarians and their capital Rethra

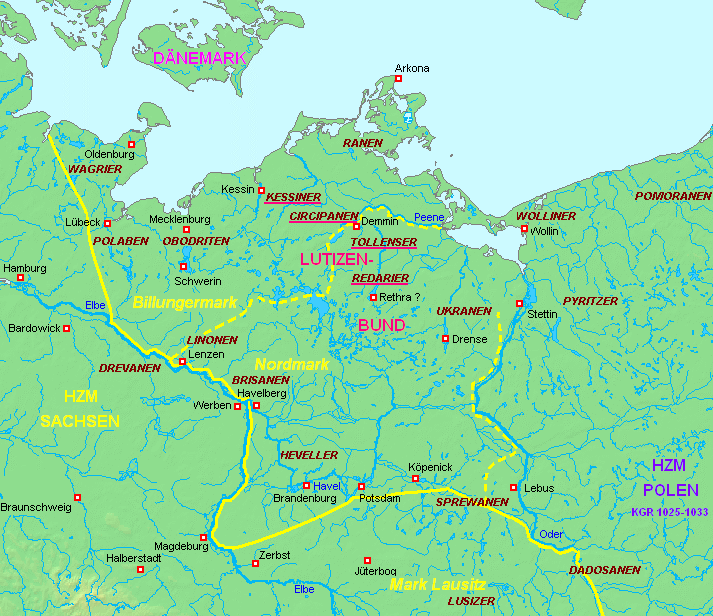
- Status: Independent federation of Polabian Slavic tribes
- Capital: none, only political/religious centre: Rethra or Radgosc (until 12th century); Arkona (since 12th century–1168)
- Common languages: Polabian Slavic
- Religion: Polabian (Note: Compared to the original old Slavic religion, the pagan religion of Polabian Slavs was "reformed" (improved) by wooden temples and priesthood as a high social class with political influence. Almost every Polabian tribe had its own pagan cult of a deity of military function or some version of the supreme god, whose high priests sometimes had a military retinue and were equal to the chiefs or politically stronger. This made pagan cults more organized and the Polabian Slavs more resistant to Christianization than other Slavic peoples, who had less organized paganism and practiced as a folk religion. It also caused the creation of a local theocracies.) Slavic paganism, the known major cults: Svarozhich/Radegast in Rethra-Radgosc; Svetovid in Arkona, Rügen; Gerovit in Havelberg; Rugiewit with Porenut and Porewit in Charenza, Rügen; Triglav in Brennabor; Chernoglav in Jasmund, Rügen; Pripegala (disputed); Folk polytheism of minor cults (unnamed twins gods near Tollensesee etc.); Chernobog according to Helmold; Roman Catholicism (missionaries, some nobles)
- Government: Petty monarchies and pagan theocracies
- no sole ruler/leader^{a}
- Legislature: Popular assembly of social elites
- History
  - Formed: 10th century
  - Conquest of Rethra, collapse: 12th century
  - Conquest of Arkona by Danes: 1168
Preceded by
Confederation of the Veleti
Billung March (Duchy of Saxony)
Succeeded by
Rani of Rügen
Holy Roman Empire
∟Northern March
∟March of Brandenburg
∟Duchy of Saxony
∟March of Lusatia
- Today part of: Germany
- 1. In addition to tribal princes/chiefs and pagan high priests as local rulers.

The Lutici or Liutizi (known by various spelling variants) were a federation of West Slavic Polabian tribes, who between the 10th and 12th centuries lived in what is now northeastern Germany. Four tribes made up the core of the federation: the Redarians (Redari, Redarii), Circipanians (Circipani), Kessinians (Kessini, Kycini, Chizzini) and Tollensians (Tholenzi). At least in part, the Lutici were a continuation of the Veleti. In contrast to the former and the neighboring peoples, the Lutici were not led by a Christian monarch or duke; power was asserted through consensus formed in central assemblies of the social elites, and the Lutici worshipped nature and several deities. The political and religious center was Radgosc (also referred to by several other names, e.g., Riedegost or Rethra).

The Lutici were first recorded by written sources in the context of the uprising of 983, by which they annihilated the rule of the Holy Roman Empire in the Billung and Northern Marches. Hostilities continued until 997. Thereafter, tensions with the empire eased, and in 1003 the Lutici entered an alliance with the emperor against Duke Bolesław I of Poland. However, by 1033 the alliance broke apart, and a German–Lutician war broke out that lasted until 1035, when the Lutici became tributaries of the empire again, but otherwise retained their independence. A civil war between the core tribes began the decline of the Lutici in 1056/1057. The neighboring Obodrites intervened and subdued the northwestern faction.

In 1066, the Lutici succeeded in stirring up a revolt against the Obodrite elites, in the course of which John, the bishop of Mecklenburg, was captured and sacrificed at Radgosc. As a consequence, the bishop of Halberstadt and the emperor sacked and destroyed Radgosc in subsequent campaigns, and its role as the leading pagan cult site was taken over by the Swantewit temple at Arkona. Another civil war in the 1070s led to a further decline of the Lutician federation, which was then unable to resist conquests and looting by its neighbors in the following decades.

During the first half of the 12th century, the settlement area of the Lutici was partitioned between Obodrite principalities, the later Duchy of Mecklenburg (west), the re-constituted Northern March, which became the Margraviate of Brandenburg (south), and the Duchy of Pomerania (east). The Lutici were converted to Christianity, and in the 13th century were assimilated by German settlers and became part of the German people during the Ostsiedlung.

== Veleti origins ==
At least in part, the Lutici were a continuation of the Veleti (Wilzi, Wilci), who are referred to by sources of the late 8th and first half of the 9th centuries as having inhabited the same region, and according to the Bavarian Geographer were likewise organized in four tribes (regiones). Whether the Lutici were ethnically identical with the Veleti remains unproven.

Contemporary chronicles sometimes connect the Lutici to the Veleti, e.g., Adam von Bremen (Gesta II,22) refers to them as "Leuticios, qui alio nomine Wilzi dicuntur", and Helmold von Bosau (Chronica Slavorum I,2) says "Hii quatuor populi a fortidudine Wilzi sive Lutici appellantur." Modern scholarship sometimes refers to both entities by a double name, e.g., "Wilzen-Lutizen" in German or "Wieleci-Lucice" in Polish.

In the second half of the 9th century, the Veleti disappeared from written records. Lutician tribes first appear in written records after this gap: the Redarii were mentioned first in 928 by Widukind of Corvey, who listed them in the context of Slavic tribes subdued by Henry I. Incidentally, this list also contains the first mention of the Veleti after beforementioned gap, and the Redarians are listed as a separate entity from the Veleti. In 955, the Tollensians and Circipanians are first mentioned in the annals of St. Gallen, likewise in addition to the Veleti, in the context of the Battle of Recknitz (Raxa).

This co-listing of Veleti with Redarians, Tollensians and/or Circipanians was however not repeated in subsequent records, e.g., the Ottonian documents do not mention the Veleti at all, while repeatedly referencing Redarians, Tollensians, Circipanes and other tribes in the respective area. Furthermore, there are only very few mentions of the Veleti in 10th century sources: in addition to the previously mentioned records, the Veleti are referenced only in the annals of St. Gallen in 995 and in the annals of Quedlinburg in 995 and 997.

According to Fritze (1982), this reflects the uncertain nomenclature after the Veleti's decline, at least as a political entity, in the mid-9th century. A variant of the designation "Lutici" was first recorded in the Annals of Hildesheim in 991, and starting in eastern Saxony, this name was gradually adopted by other chroniclers. The first mention of the Kessinians is an entry in Adam von Bremen's Gesta Hammaburgensis ecclesiae pontificum, referring to the year of 1056.

== Organisation ==
The Lutici were a federation of several smaller tribes between the Warnow and Mildenitz in the west, the Havel in the south and the Oder in the east, with the core formed by four tribes: Redarians, Tolensians, Kessinians and Circipanians. Within the federation, power was asserted by representatives of the clans and settlement communities (the "elders"). The highest political institution of both Veleti and Lutici was the assembly of the free, yet in contrast to the Veleti who were led by a prince, the Lutici were a "tribe without a ruler", meaning political power was asserted via discourse in an assembly.

This type of government had its roots in the Veleti period: since the mid-9th century, no Veleti princes or kings are recorded, and archaeology has revealed that in this period, many small strongholds were built in the area, in part on the ruins of the earlier, large strongholds. During the Lutician assemblies, decisions were made based on consensus, and once a decision had been made it was enforced by "severe punishment" of any violations. While similar types of government have been postulated for archaic Slavic societies, this was unusual for contemporary ones, who were usually led by a prince, duke or king asserting power via feudal dependencies.

Though missing a monarch, the Lutici had a social hierarchy. Political power was asserted by nobles, priests and free farmers. A reference to social differentiation is made by Thietmar (Chronicon VI, 25), who reported a progressive fine system imposing higher fines for offenses on persons with a higher social status.

Whether or not the Lutician tribes had a common ethnic identity remains speculative: The cultural differences to the neighboring tribes (Obodrites, Hevelli, Pomeranians) were minor, while differences with the Saxon and Christian culture and military pressure asserted by the Holy Roman Empire have most probably resulted in a common identity, evidently in mutual solidarity expressed by the common councils and combined military campaigns. Thietmar (VIII/5) refers to the resulting way of life as libertas more Liuticio.

The most important stronghold of the Lutici was Radgosc or Riedegost in the territory of the Redarii. After a period of dominance by the Hevelli, centered on the other important Wendish stronghold of Brenna (Brandenburg), the Redarii became a dominant regional power themselves after the 930s. This is documented by the amount of silver tribute the Redarii were to pay to the Holy Roman Empire, and the failure of the latter to permanently subdue the area despite multiple campaigns.

== Names and spelling variants ==
The name of the Lutici has survived in its many Latinized spelling variants used by contemporary chroniclers, most of which are still used in modern historiography in addition to their English, German and Polish renderings. The etymology of these terms is not sure, it has been proposed that they derive from the ur-Slavic root *ljutъ, meaning "severe, cruel, freezing, sharp, wild, or fierce" - used in the contemporary name of February in Belorusian, Bulgarian, Polish, Ukrainian, possibly an unfavorable nickname used by conflicted Slavic neighbors, or from the Slavic root *lutъ or its Latin equivalent lutum, meaning "swamp". The Polabian original might have been *L'utici.

Spelling variants of "Lutici"
Latinized form*	Anglicized form	Germanized form	Polonized form
Lutici	Luticians	-	Lucice
Leutici	Leuticians	-	-
Liutici	Liuticians	-	-
Lyutici	-	-	-
Lutitii	Lutitians	-	-
-	Liutitians	-	-
Lutizi	Lutizians	Lutizen	-
Leutizi	Leutizians	Leutizen	-
Liutizi	Liutizians	Liutizen	-

* as adopted from contemporary Latin sources by Anglo-Saxon historiography

The names of the four subtribes relate to their respective settlement areas: the Kessini around their main stronghold Kessin on the lower Warnow, the Circipani were centered on the upper Peene, the Tollensians on the Tollense, and the Redarians lived south of Lake Tollensesee around Radgosc. In the latter case though, it is unknown whether the name of the deity is the root of the stronghold's and the tribe's name or if it is the other way around (see section on Radgosc below), and alternative theories connect their name to a hypothetical river "Rada" or propose a translation as "red-haired people". Earlier theories translating "Redarii" as "farmers", "plowers" or "warriors" have been refuted.

The names of these tribes likewise survived in various spelling variants, including Tolensane and Tholenzi for the Tollensians; Circipani, Zcirizspani and Zerezpani for the Circipanians; as well as Riaderi, Redarii, and Rederi for the Redarians.

== History ==
=== Revolt of 983 ===
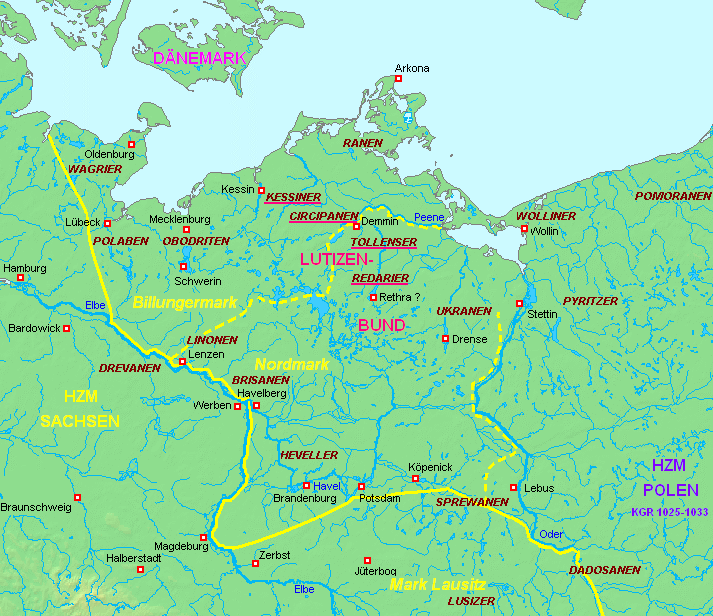
Lutician federation (983–1056/1057)

In 983, the Lutici initiated an open rebellion, and in the ensuing war (983–995) succeeded in revoking imperial control over most of the Northern and Billung marches, where the corresponding bishoprics of Brandenburg and Havelberg were de facto annihilated. The rebellion did not only affect Lutician territories, but also those of the neighboring Obodrites (also Abodriti) and Hevelli (also Stodorani). The strategically important Hevellian Brandenburg was sacked by Lutician forces and successfully defended against the Saxon margraves and Hevellian princes. Incidentally, the pagan Luticians appointed Kizo, a Saxon Christian, commander of the Brandenburg. Contemporary German chronicler Thietmar (VI, 25) blames the uprising on maltreatment of the Lutici by the margraves: "warriors, who used to be our servants, now free as a consequence of our injustices ["iniquitates"]."

In the Obodrite principality, the Luticians initiated a revolt aimed at the abolishment of feudal rule and Christianity, drawing on consideral support from the Obodrite populace. In part, the Obodrite revolt was successful: the princely family, though in part remaining Christian, dissolved Christian institutions, and the Bishop of Oldenburg had to abandon his bishopric. The Obodrite rebels destroyed the see in Oldenburg and also the see of the diocese, Hamburg. The ensuing war with the Saxons however culminated in the sack of the Obodrite stronghold of Mecklenburg by Otto III, Holy Roman Emperor, in 995.

The uprising had started when the Holy Roman Empire was weakened by the defeat emperor Otto II had suffered against the Saracens in the Battle of Stilo (982). Otto II died in Rome shortly after the rebellion started, and three weeks later, his three-year-old son Otto III was crowned and anointed king of the Germans by the archbishops of Mainz and Ravenna in Aachen (Aix-la-Chapelle) on Christmas 983.

The coronation was not undisputed: an oppositional group had formed in the empire supporting the kingship of Bavarian duke Henry the Quarrelsome, and the Christian West Slavic dukes Boleslaus II of Bohemia and Mieszko I of Poland as well as the Christian Obodrite prince Mstivoj were among the latter's supporters. All of them had accepted Henry's claim to the throne at the Quedlinburg Hoftag of Easter 984, and only at the Quedlinburg Hoftag of Easter 986 Otto III was accepted as king by the opposition, including the Bohemian and Polish dukes.

While neither Mstivoj (also Mistui, died between 992 and 995), nor his son and successor Mstislav were present at the 986 meeting, they continued to maintain close ties to the empire, despite their participation in campaigns into Saxon Nordalbingia and Altmark in the initial stage of the uprising.

Handling of the Lutician rebellion thus became a central objective for the young king, and several campaigns of the Lutici and Obodriti into the eastern Duchy of Saxony and German campaigns vice versa are recorded for nearly every year of his kingship. Thereby, the Saxons experienced several difficulties resulting from the de-central organization of the Lutici. Apart from the attempted reconquest of the lost sees of the bishoprics, the Saxon armies faced wide heaths, lake- and woodlands that lacked targets suitable to decide the war. According to the Annales Quedlinburgensis, the first Saxon campaign of 985 thus followed a tactic of scorched earth: "with fire and slaughter, they devastated the whole region" (Latin: totam terram illam incendiis et caedibus devastaverunt), a characterization that applied to the following campaigns as well. Following a hypothesis forwarded in modern historiography, e.g., by Gerd Althoff, these campaigns did not have the primary purpose of a reconquest, but rather the purpose of looting and taking revenge.

The first such campaign in which Otto III participated was in 986, when Otto was six years old. In 991, at the age of eleven, he participated in the temporary reconquest of Brandenburg, which was soon lost again due to the treason of a Saxon defector. In 992, he participated again in the subsequent siege of Brandenburg, where the Saxon army suffered heavy casualties before it was victorious in 993. In 994, however, the war's tide turned again.

Thus, Otto III organized a campaign involving an abundance of princes of the empire, which was also the first campaign he led as an independent ruler, since before 994/995 he had been under the tutelage of his mother Theophanu, and after her death, under the tutelage of his grandmother, Adelaide, and Willigis, archbishop of Mainz. Among the participants of the campaign were Bernard I of Saxony, his former rival Henry the Quarrelsome of Bavaria along with his son and later emperor Henry IV (II), also the bishops of Regensburg and Freising, the archbishop of Magdeburg (Giselher with his suffragan Eiko), of Meißen, as well as the margraves Gero and Liuthar, duke Mieszko's son Bolesław I of Poland, a son of duke Boleslaus II of Bohemia, and the latter's rival Soběslav, brother of Adalbert of Prague. While Henry the Quarrelsome died before the campaign started in 995, and his son Henry IV (II) thereupon returned to Bavaria to secure his succession, the participants' list and the assembled force distinguished this campaign from the mostly Saxon campaigns mounted to crush the rebellion before.

The 995 campaign also played a role in Bohemian history: Boleslaus II, against his promises, made use of the absence of his rival Soběslav, marched on the latter's stronghold in Libice and killed the members of his family, the opposing Slavnikids.

In early 996, Otto III left for Rome to receive the imperial crown from pope Gregory V. At the same time, Adalbert of Prague was also in Rome, and both Otto and Adalbert left – on different routes – in June 996, to meet again in Ingelheim and Mainz during the fall. Adalbert, who in Rome and with the pope's consent had agreed on going on a mission into pagan territory, yet he was still undecided on whether he should try to convert the Lutici or the Old Prussians. Eventually he settled for a mission to the Prussians, who killed him on 23 April 997. Also in 997, Otto III mounted a last campaign into the areas held by the Lutici, targeting the Hevelli. Afterwards, Otto III instead focused on plans to reorganise the Holy Roman Empire.

=== German–Lutician alliance against Poland ===
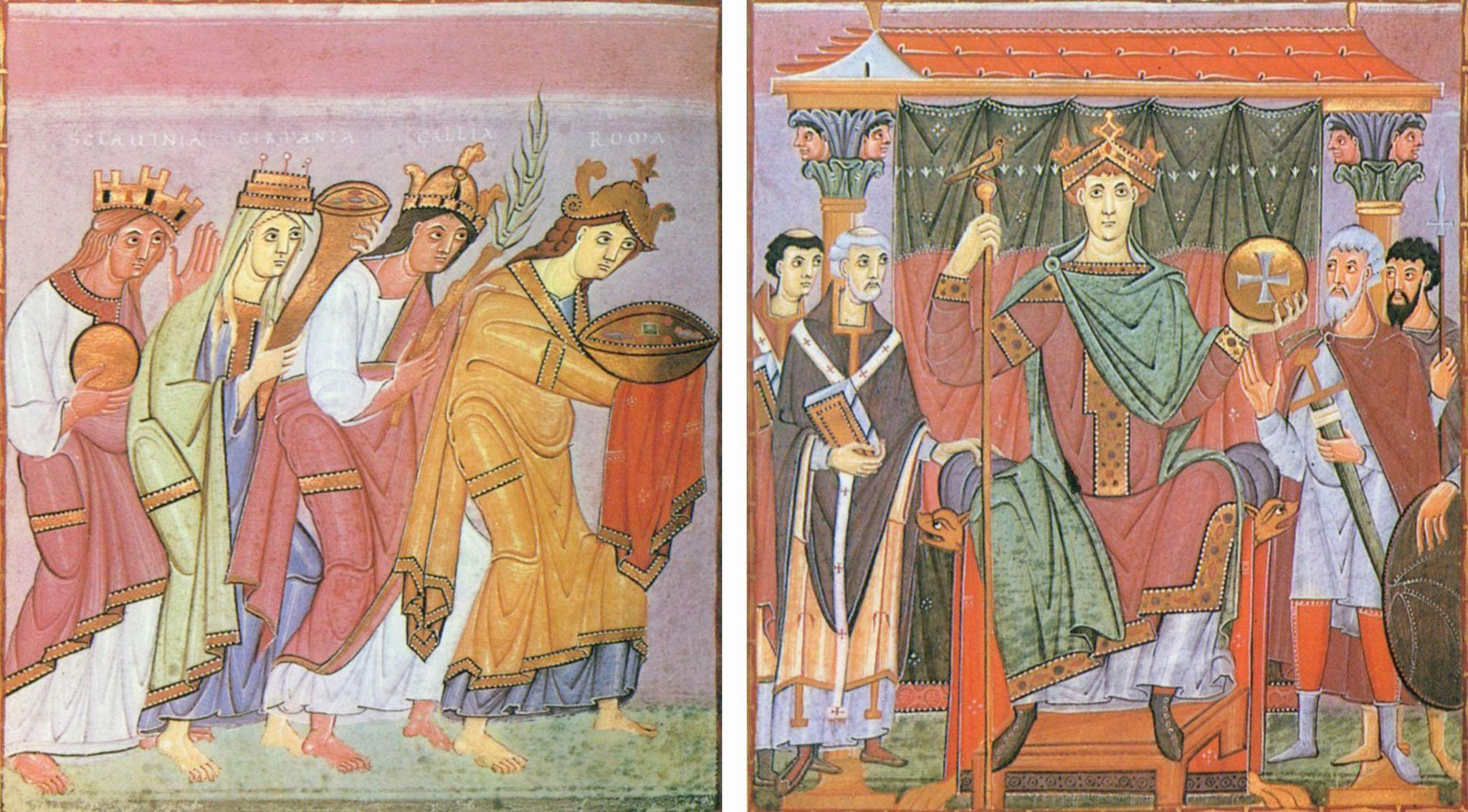
"Sclavinia", "Germania", "Gallia" and "Roma" with presents for Otto III (c. 1000)

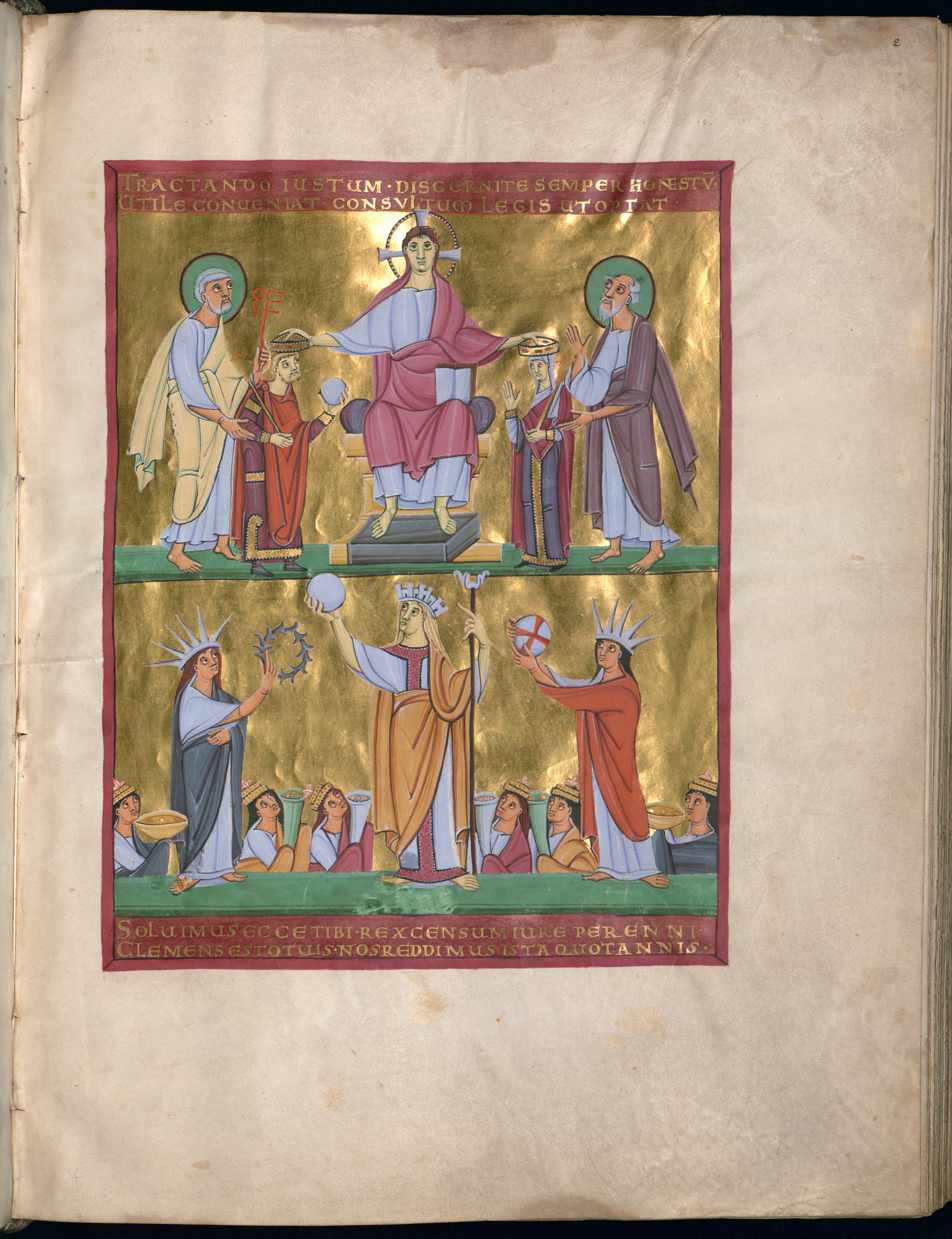
"Germania", "Gallia" and "Roma" pay hommage to Henry II (between 1007 and 1012)

Contemporary illustrations of the personalized provinces of the Holy Roman Empire paying hommage to the emperors Otto III (above) and Henry II (below). "Sclavinia", symbolizing the Slavic lands, is depicted in the above, but missing in the below illustration.

After the Lutici gained independence, Otto III allied against them with Mieszko I of Poland, whom he wanted to integrate in his renovatio imperii Romani. Mieszko's successor Bolesław I Chrobry however expanded his realm and denied Otto's successor Henry II homage for Bohemia, conquered in 1003. Furthermore, Bolesław supported the inner-German opposition to Henry. This led Henry to abandon the reconquest of the Lutician areas, and instead offer them an alliance against Bolesław, first recorded at a meeting in Quedlinburg on 28 March 1003. Since the Lutici remained pagan, this policy was widely criticised in the empire, especially by the clergy. By 1004, Henry had expelled Bolesław from Bohemia and adjacent territories in Lusatia, and by 1005 mounted a counteroffensive.

The Lutici, who participated in the campaign, caused dismay among the Christian army when carrying idols of their deities with them. Thietmar of Merseburg blames delays that prevented the imperial army from decisively defeating Bolesław on the Lutici, and obviously it was not in the Lutician interest to eliminate Bolesław's threat to Henry as this was the basis for the German-Lutician alliance preventing the resumption of German campaigns into Lutician territory. On the other hand, the delays were caused also by corrupt guides and several Saxon nobles, who also opposed campaigns against Christian Bolesław and rather supported re-establishing control and mission of the pagan Lutici. The campaign was aborted near Poznań when Bolesław's envoys negotiated a peace.

Afterwards, Bolesław negotiated an anti-Lutician alliance "in Christo" with unknown nobles at Magdeburg, while "with words and money" trying to instigate Lutician and Bohemian campaigns against Henry at the same time, according to the testimony of Lutician and Bohemian envoys at Regensburg (Easter 1007). The Lutician and Bohemian envoys demanded a prompt attack on Bolesław, yet Henry faced considerable opposition of several nobles against a renewed war. The war (1007–1013) was then started by Bolesław, and sources do not mention Lutician participation. The next record of the Lutici in the sources is of negotiations in Amberg in November 1012, confirming the alliance of 1003. Considerable Lutician forces participated in the two following campaigns of Henry II against Bolesław in 1015 and 1017.

In 1017, however, two incidents led to the temporary departure of the Lutici from the campaign. First, a stone's throw from a compagnon of margrave Hermann Billung damaged a Lutician idol, and Henry II had to reconcile them with twelve pounds of silver. Secondly, they lost fifty warriors and an idol of a female deity in a flood while crossing the Mulde river, near Wurzen. The Lutici interpreted these incidents as bad omen, and departed determined to break the alliance with the emperor. Yet, an assembly was convoked where it was decided to re-enter the war on the emperor's side, and two Lutician armies again attacked Bolesław later in 1017. One Lutician army joined the emperor's forces in the siege of Glogau (Thietmar VII, 59), while the other attacked another stronghold of Bolesław and devastated the surrounding region once they had lost 100 men in an unsuccessful attempt to take it (Thietmar VII, 61). Günther, an eremite from Magdeburg, tried to mission in the Lutician lands during the same year without success.

The Peace of Bautzen (1018) ended the war between Henry and Bolesław, and the Lutici attacked their western neighbors, the Obodrite dukes, during the same year. They justified the attack with the fact that the Obodrites had not participated in the war. The Lutici were supported by part of the Obodrites, and the resulting revolt expelled Obodrite duke Mstislav to Saxony and destroyed the see in Oldenburg. This caused the Danish king Canute the Great to intervene in 1019, and the duke of Saxony and the bishop of Bremen, previously in a dispute about influence in the Obodrite areas, combined their forces in 1020 and ended the revolt in 1021.

When Henry II died, Bolesław I of Poland used the power vacuum in the empire to crown himself king in 1025. While he died in the same year, his son and successor Mieszko II also took on the royal title, denied paying homage to the successor of Henry II, emperor Conrad II, and coveted the Lutici territories. Conrad renewed the German–Lutician alliance. In 1028, Mieszko invaded and devastated the area east of the Saale river in a campaign which also affected the Lutician associate tribe of the Hevelli. Thus, in the same year, Lutician delegates asked Conrad for help against "tyrant Mieszko" at a synode in Pöhlde; Conrad's answer, however, is not recorded. From 1029 to 1032, the emperor mounted several campaigns against Miesko II, utterly defeating him and forcing him into the disadvantageous Peace of Merseburg in 1033. Whether Lutician forces participated in the campaigns is not known. With Poland defeated and disintegrating in a civil war, the German–Lutician alliance had lost its basis, and a new war began.

=== German–Lutician war ===
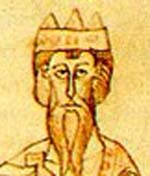
Conrad II

In 1033, a Lutician army repeatedly attacked the fortress of Werben on the Elbe. A Saxon relief army was defeated, whereby 42 knights were killed. Emperor Conrad II however focussed on securing succession in Burgundy and thus refrained from immediate retaliation. In 1035, the Lutici sacked Werben after an act of treason and killed most of the defendants. Conrad II, supported by Bretislav of Bohemia, retaliated with a large-scale campaign into the Lutician territories. The result was inconclusive, with both sides suffering heavy casualties.

A subsequent campaign mounted primarily by Saxon nobles resulted in the defeat of the Lutici, who had to agree to a high tribute and provide hostages. Despite the defeat, the Lutici retained their autonomy, and the bishoprics of Brandenburg and Havelberg were not reinstated.

=== Civil wars and Obodrite rule ===
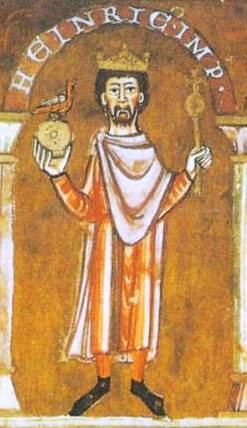
Henry IV

In 1056/1057, the Lutician federation disintegrated in a civil war. Kessini and Circipani fought against Tollensians and Redarii. The dispute was decided by an intervention of the Obodrite prince Gottschalk, son-in-law of the Danish jarl Sven Estridson. After Obodrite ruler Ratibor and his sons had been killed in battle in 1043, Gottschalk had established himself as the new ruler of the Obodrite and part of the Lutician realm with the support of Sven Estridson and Bernard II, Duke of Saxony. According to Adam of Bremen (Gesta II, 79), Gottschalk went to the "Slavic lands with a mighty force, attacked everybody and caused great fear among the pagans". In 1057, again with the support of Bernard II and Sven Estridson, Gottschalk subdued the Kessini and Circipani and integrated them into his realm.

In 1066, the Lutici were involved in the Obodrite revolt, in the course of which Gottschalk was slain, his wife and her abigails were chased out of Mecklenburg naked, and a monk, Ansvar, and others were stoned to death in Ratzeburg. Adam of Bremen (III, 51) further recorded the capture of the elderly Mecklenburg bishop "Iohannes" (Johann, John Scotus), who was carried to Radgosc, where his severed head was sacrificed to Redigost. However, Halberstadt bishop Burchard sacked Radgosc in the winter of 1067/1068, and as a symbol of his victory rode home on the temple's sacred horse. In the winter of 1069, king and later emperor Henry IV led a follow-up campaign into the Lutician territories, looting and pillaging the area.

In 1073, however, Henry IV sought to win the Lutici as allies against a Saxon opposition led by Otto of Northeim. According to Bruno of Querfurt, Henry IV offered the Lutici the chance of conquering as much Saxon land as they desired. The Saxon nobles then tried to also win the Lutici as allies against Henry IV: Among the Lutici, another civil war broke out between the factions supporting either Otto or Henry, resulting in a high death toll. As a consequence, the Lutici were unable to attack either Henry or Otto. However, due to the emerging Investiture Controversy, Henry IV had to shift his focus away from the Lutician areas, so the remaining Lutici retained their independence. In 1090, the Obodrite prince Henry had consolidated the Obodrite realm with Danish and Saxon support, and killed his rival Kruto. After an Obodrite revolt was quelled in 1093, Henry expanded eastward in several campaigns, and subdued all Lutician areas north of the Havel river. In 1100/1101, Henry's combined Obodrite and Saxon forces sieged Havelberg to quell a revolt of the Hevelli and Brisani, while his son Mistue looted the territory of the nearby Linoni with 300 Slavs and 200 Saxons.

=== Division and conversion of the Lutician areas ===
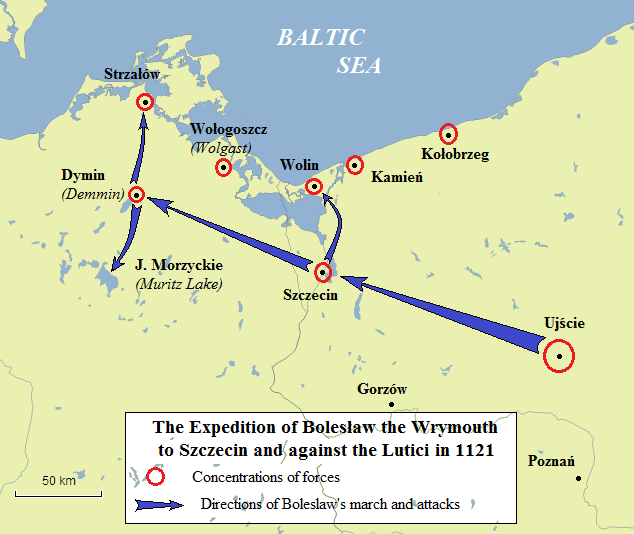
The expedition of Bolesław III Wrymouth, Duke of Poland, to Szczecin and east of the Oder to subjugate the Slavic Lutici, in 1121.

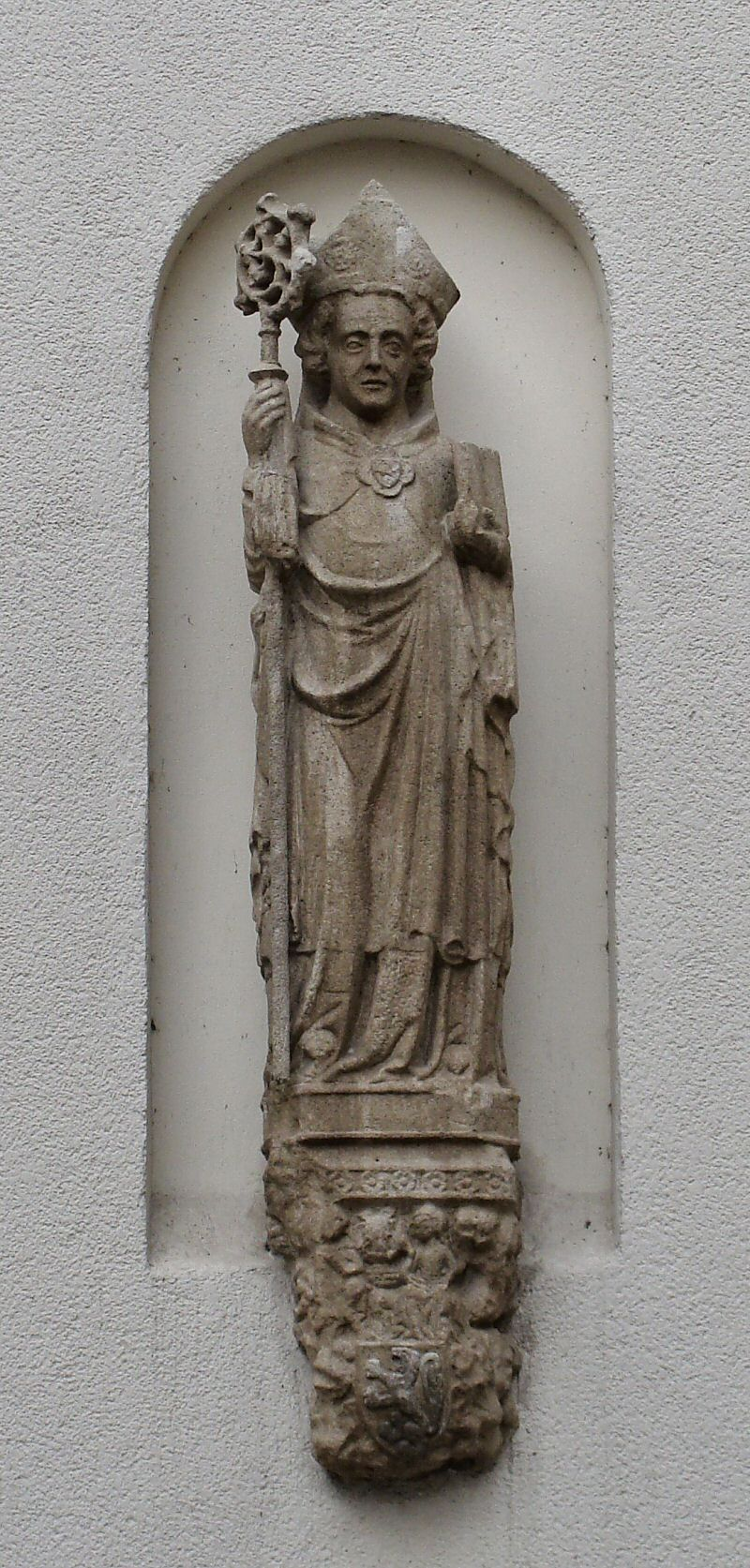
Statue of Otto of Bamberg at the Ducal Castle, Szczecin

In 1110, upon getting news of the defeat of the Holy Roman Emperor Henry V in the German-Polish War of 1109, the Dołężanie and the Redarians rebelled against German authority. The uprising was quelled by Lothair of Supplinburg, who had recently been made Duke of Saxony by Henry. However, Lothair and Henry became engaged in a struggle of their own. When in 1115 Lothair defeated Henry in the Battle of Welfesholz, the emperor's influence in Saxony and the Wendish territories had virtually disappeared. On the other hand, Lothair then followed an expansionist policy himself. Among the tribes he campaigned against, regardless of whether they were within the Obodrite sphere of interest, were also the Kessini, whose prince Dumar was subdued, along with his sons, in 1114. This campaign was supported by the (nominal) margrave of the Northern March, whose army included 300 Circipanian cavalry. Several subsequent campaigns of Lothair into the Lutician areas followed between 1115 and 1127.

In 1121, Lothair mounted another successful campaign against the Kessini, this time sacking their main stronghold Kessin and subduing their prince Sventipolk. In the same year, Bolesław III Wrymouth advanced from the lower Oder region deep into Lutician territory, reaching and devastating the Müritz region. According to Maleczynski (1939), Bolesław thereby "most likely took Demmin and Gützkow" and, with reference to the 1121 campaign of Lothair of Supplinburg, "German and Polish expansion met at Müritz lake and the upper Peene river, and probably in the vicinity of today's Stralsund." Enders (1986) says that during the same campaign, Bolesław destroyed the Ukrian stronghold of Nadam, following a thesis that Nadam was located near today's Nieden.

Herrmann (1968) proposed that Bolesław's campaign followed a fork of the Magdeburg–Malchow route, which ran from Lake Müritz to Szczecin, via Nieden. In 1127, a campaign of Lothair was also targeted at the Gützkow area. With his campaigns, Lothair renewed the German claim to the areas lost in 983.

In 1127, Kessin was again sacked, along with Werle, this time by Obodrite prince Sventipolk. A son of Henry (deceased 1125), Sventipolk struggled for his father's heritage against his brother Knud. In his campaign against the Kessini he was supported by Adolf I, Count of Schauenburg. However, Sventipolk, his son Swinike and his brother Knud were all murdered in 1128, and in 1129 Lothair (king of the Germans since 1125) gave the "kingdom of the Obodrites" to Danish Knud Lavard, who was however murdered by a relative in 1131. His successor in the eastern Obodrite realm, up to the Peene river, was Niklot.

The eastern Lutician areas between the Peene, Tollense, Uecker and Oder rivers had by then been subdued by the Pomeranian duke Wartislaw I, and the Lutician primores of this area converted to Christianity in 1128. Thence the Pomeranian dukes occasionally styled themselves dux Liuticiorum. The conversion of the Lutici was accomplished by Otto of Bamberg, who had also missioned the Pomeranians (Slavic tribe) and the tribes on the lower Oder (Prissani and Wolinians, all under Wartislaw's rule) in 1124/1125. Bolesław III of Poland had subdued Wartislaw after his abovementioned Lutician campaign, and in 1127 was on the verge of attacking Wartislaw again because of the latter's Lutician conquests, which had considerably strengthened Wartislaw's position. When Otto of Bamberg waited for Wartislaw I in Demmin in 1128 to convert the Lutici, the Pomeranian duke appeared with two armies, and according to Otto's biographer Herbod, looted and burned the surrounding areas before he held talks with Otto about the conversion.

Wartislaw had also convened a meeting of the Lutician nobles at Usedom, where they accepted Christianity upon Otto's and Wartislaw's appearance. Otto then destroyed the pagan temples at Wolgast and Gützkow, before he mediated in the dispute between Wartislaw I and Bolesław III. Bolesław aborted his preparations for war, and in turn Wartislaw accepted Bolesław's superiority for his territories east of the Oder, while for the Lutician areas his superior was Lothair. When the pope crowned Lothair Holy Roman Emperor at Rome on 6 June 1133, he also issued a document addressed at bishop Norbert of Magdeburg listing a "Bishopric of Szczecin" for the Lutician areas between Elbe and Oder, and a Pomeranian bishopric for the areas east of the Oder. These bishoprics, however, never materialised; instead, the Bishopric of Wolin was founded in 1140 for the areas then ruled by Wartislaw.

In 1134, Lothair gave the Northern March, i.e. the area south of the Peene river, to Albrecht the Bear of the House of Ascania. The Wendish Crusade of 1147 targeted the Obodrite and Lutician areas. After a period of Danish rule in the northern part, the Holy Roman Empire's duchies of Pomerania and Mecklenburg (successor of the Obodrite state) as well as the Margraviate of Brandenburg (successor of the Northern March) had consolidated in the former Lutician areas. In the course of the Ostsiedlung in the 13th century, the Lutici were assimilated by German settlers, ultimately becoming part of the German people.

== Religion ==
Traditionally, the Lutici worshipped nature in sacred groves or at springs, lakes, and rivers. There, worship and sacrificing were done in the open without the support of priests. In addition, the Lutici maintained several cult sites. The density of Lutician temples was the highest in the whole Slavic settlement area. As of 2002, about twenty such cult sites have been identified, with Radgosc being the most important one before the Svantevit temple at Arkona took over the leading role after Radgosc's destruction. Cult sites such as Radgosc were maintained by priests, and since in Lutician society, politics was closely tied to religious beliefs and not ruled by a secular monarch, the Radgosc priests were extremely influential. According to Thietmar (VI, 25), every Lutician region had its own temple, each home to a special idol.

The maintenance of temple sites marks the transition from the worship of nature to the worship of idols representing personalized deities, a trend that in historiography is interpreted as resulting from contacts to Christianity. While the erection of cult sites flourished since the 10th century, an idol dating to the 7th to 8th century has been found in Feldberg, and a cult site surrounded by planks was found in the fortress of Groß Raden, dating to the second half of the 9th century.

=== Radgosc (Rethra) ===
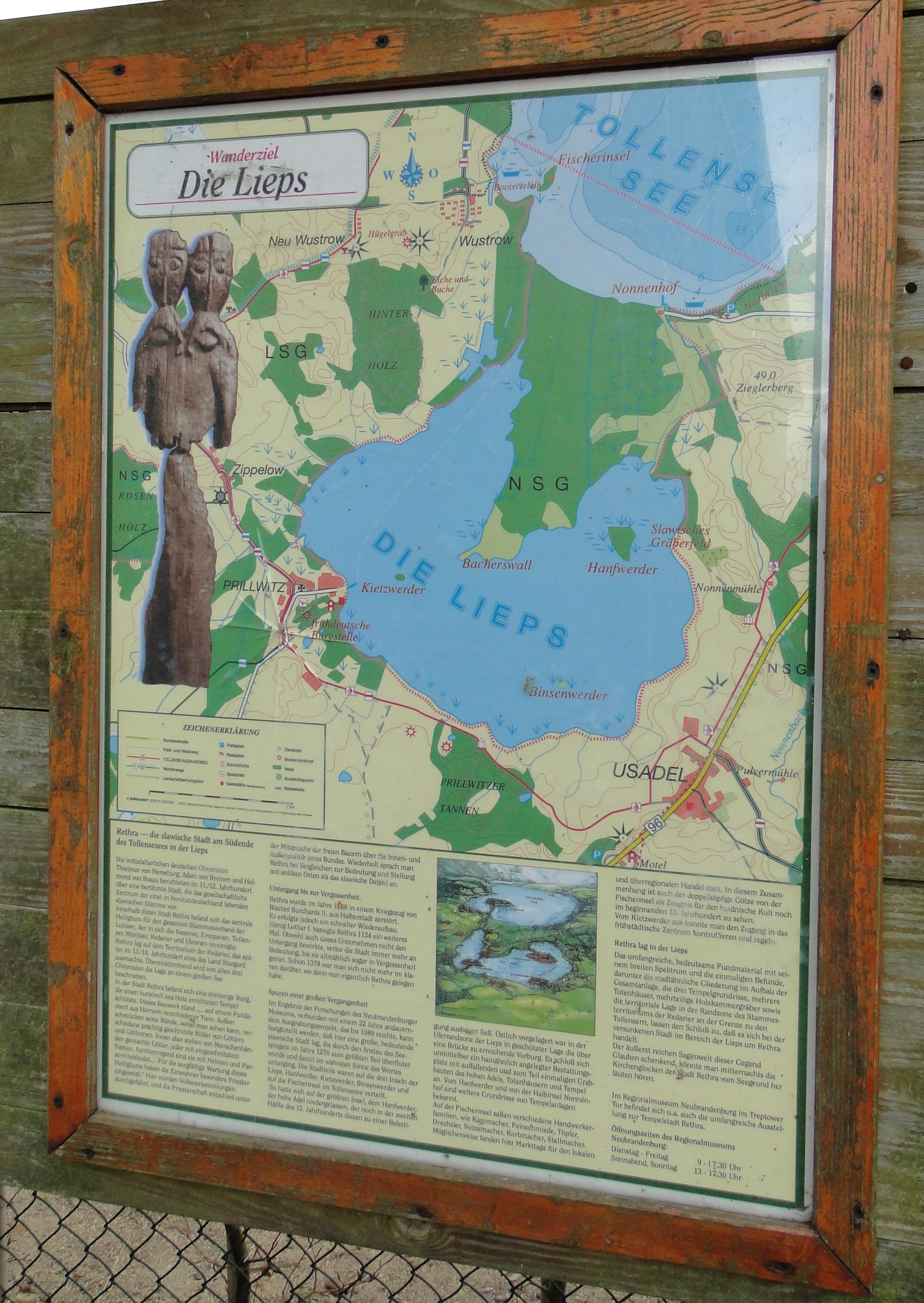
Information board near the lake Lieps, claiming to be the site of Radgosc (Rethra). However, a scholarly consensus on the temple's location has not yet been established, and various theories have been forwarded and refuted.

The main deity worshipped in Radgosc was reported as Zuarasici by Thietmar (VI, 23), and as Redigost (Redigast, Riedegost) by Adam of Bremen (II, 21; III, 51) and Helmold (I, 2). This is interpreted by historians and linguists in different ways: probably, the different names mark the transition from an appellativum related with the Iranian root xvar, "sun", to a distinct personalized deity with the name Riedegost. This could then have been adopted as the name of the temple (Radgosc) and as the name of the tribe settling there (Redarii). Following the alternative hypothesis, it was the other way around: Adam of Bremen and Helmold mistakenly adopted the name of the temple site as the name of the deity, which was correctly identified by Thietmar and corresponds with Svarožič or Svarog. According to a third theory, Riedegost was the second name of Thietmar's Zuarasici.

Thietmar (VI, 25) details Radgosc's elevated position as follows: "To [Rethra], they bid farewell when they go to war, [Rethra] is honoured with due gift upon their fortunate return, and it is carefully determined [...] by lot and horse [oracle], what sacrifices the priests have to make to the deities. When in their unspeakable wrath, however, they are comforted with the blood of animals and humans."

According to Helmold of Bosau, the revolt of 983 was started after a meeting at the civitas Rethre, and the successful beginning of the revolt of 1066 was according to Adam of Bremen celebrated in Radgosc by the ritual decapitation of captured bishop Johann of Mecklenburg and the sacrifice of his head, stuck on a lance, to Riedegost. The last historical record of "Rheda" is an entry in the Annals of Augsburg for the year 1068, describing its capture by bishop Burchard and the abduction of its sacred horse. It is assumed that Radgosc was destroyed either in this or one of the following campaigns, probably it was destroyed and rebuilt several times since Ebo's Vita Ottonis episcopi Bambergensis (III, 5) mentions the destruction of "the Lutician civitas and temple" by king Lothair of Supplinburg in 1126/1127, without specifying its name.

Thietmar (VI, 23) described Radgosc as a castle (urbs) with three horns (tricornis) and three gates (tres in se continens portas), two of which could be reached by land, while the third and smallest one faced a lake (mare) to the east, supposedly a terrifying sight (horribile visu). The castle was surrounded by woodland (silva). Inside the castle, there was a wooden temple grounded on animal horns, and in this temple there were idols of several deities, who each had a name engraved and wore a helmet and armor, with Zuarasici being the highest deity. Guidons (vexilla) of these deities were stored inside the temple and were only to leave the room during a war. Thietmar wrote this when the Lutici were allies of the emperor, an alliance he opposed, and included his Radgosc report with the purpose of advising the Germans against it. He also explicitly turned to the reader and advised them not to follow the Lutician cult, but instead adhere to the Holy Bible.

Adam of Bremen wrote his Gesta Hammaburgensis ecclesiae pontificum when Radgosc was already in decline, and gave a somewhat differing account: according to him, Radgosc, "seat of the idols" (sedes ydolatriae) was surrounded by a deep lake and had nine gates. He described Redigast as the superior deity in a large, demonic temple (templum ibi magnum constructum est demonibus, princeps est Redigast), which could be reached by a wooden bridge by those who wanted to sacrifice or ask the oracle. 12th century chronicler Helmold largely followed Adam's version. The difference in the numbers used by Thietmar ("three", tricornis) and Adam ("nine") might be explained by the symbolic use of these numbers, meant not to accurately describe Radgosc, but rather to connect it to the underworld. The boar, who according to Thietmar came out of the lake prior to a war to take pleasure in the mud, thereby "terribly shaking and appearing to many", might likewise be a symbol Thietmar used for the devil rather than an actual oracle, in contrast to the horse oracle.

The location of the former temple of Radgosc is still unknown. Theories that Radgosc might have been at Feldberg, Wanzka Abbey or Gnoien were refuted. Most theories focus on the area of Mecklenburg-Strelitz, and the Tollensesee in particular.

== 12th century burial site at Sanzkow ==
Archaeological records suggest an average life expectancy of 20 to 30 years, primarily due to a high infant and child mortality. Excavations in the Sanzkow burial site near Demmin revealed that 25.8% of the buried children were under the age of 6 years, another 4.4% under the age of 12 years, adding to an estimated infant mortality of 20%. For those who reached adulthood, the average death age was 40.7 years (males) and 34.1 years (females), and only 4.4%, primarily men, reached the age of 60 years. The lower life expectancy of women results from puerperal mortality: An average woman gave birth to three to four children in intervals of three to four years. The average heights of adult males was 1.70 m (5 ft 7 in) and 1.60 m (5 ft 3 in) for adult women. Medical research of teeth revealed a healthy diet with sufficient protein and low carbohydrate shares and a two-year breastfeeding period. Serious pathological deformations of bones were found in 28% of the adult Sanzkow skeletons, less serious ones in 44%. Most adults suffered from spondylosis deformans, especially men above the age of twenty years, but also women above the age of thirty years. Combined with high rates of osteoarthritis, likewise primarily affecting males, and other skeletal deformations, this points to high physical strain, especially of the male population. An extraordinarily high rate of bone fractures (15% of the adult population, primarily men) indicates massive involvement in battles and accidents. Skull injuries from strokes, swords and arrows were also common. Two bodies at Sanzkow were buried as vampires. For one of those, there is evidence for a head injury that might have resulted in brain dysfunctions: this man was buried with three large rocks placed on his face, breast and legs. One woman had a denture, and there is also evidence for trepanations.

== See also ==
- List of medieval Slavic tribes
- Obotrites
- Polabian Slavs
- Veleti
- Wends

== Bibliography ==
- Brather, Sebastian (2001). Archäologie der westlichen Slawen. Siedlung, Wirtschaft und Gesellschaft im früh- und hochmittelalterlichen Ostmitteleuropa. Ergänzungsbände zum Reallexikon der germanischen Altertumskunde (in German). Vol. 30. Walter de Gruyter. ISBN 3-11-017061-2.
- Fritze, Wolfgang H. (1982). "Beobachtungen zu Entstehung und Wesen des Lutizenbundes". In Kuchenbuch, Ludolf; Schich, Winfried (eds.). Frühzeit zwischen Ostsee und Donau. Germania Slavica III (in German). Vol. 6. Friedrich-Meinecke-Institut der Freien Universität Berlin. pp. 130–166. ISBN 3-428-05151-3.
- Garipzanov, Ildar H. (2008). Franks, Northmen, and Slavs. Identities and state formation in early medieval Europe. Cursor mundi. Vol. 5. Geary, Patrick J.; Urbańczyk, Przemysław. Brepols. ISBN 978-2-503-52615-7.
- Hengst, Karlheinz (2005). ""Es gibt keine bösen Völker - nur böse Menschen". Beobachtungen zum Slawenbild im Mittelalter. Die Slawen als Nachbarn der Deutschen aus Sicht eines Bischofs in Mitteldeutschland vor 1000 Jahren". In Kersten, Sandra (ed.). Spiegelungen. Entwürfe zu Identität und Alterität. Festschrift für Elke Mehnert (in German). Frank & Timme. pp. 453–514. ISBN 3-86596-015-4.
- Herrmann, Joachim (1985). Die Slawen in Deutschland: Geschichte und Kultur der slawischen Stämme westlich von Oder und Neiße vom 6. bis 12. Jahrhundert. Berlin: Akademie-Verlag. ISBN 978-0-376-08338-8.
- Lübke, Christian (2001). "Lutizen. Historisches". In Beck, Heinrich; et al. (eds.). RGA (in German). Vol. 19 (2 ed.). de Gruyter. pp. 51–53. ISBN 3-11-017163-5.
- Lübke, Christian (2002). "Zwischen Polen und dem Reich. Elbslawen und Gentilreligion". In Borgolte, Michael (ed.). Polen und Deutschland vor 1000 Jahren. Die Berliner Tagung über den "Akt von Gnesen". Europa im Mittelalter. Abhandlungen und Beiträge zur historischen Komparatistik (in German). Vol. 5. Berlin: Akademie Verlag. pp. 91–110. ISBN 3-05-003749-0.
- Müller-Wille, Michael (1991). Starigard/Oldenburg. Ein slawischer Herrschersitz des frühen Mittelalters in Ostholstein (in German). Wachholtz.
- Petersohn, Jürgen (2003). "König Otto III und die Slawen an Ostsee, Oder und Elbe um das Jahr 995". Frühmittelalterliche Studien (in German). 37 (37). Münster/Berlin: Walter de Gruyter. doi:10.1515/9783110179149.99. ISSN 0071-9706. S2CID 184121112.
- Schmidt, Roderich (2009). Das historische Pommern. Personen, Orte, Ereignisse. Veröffentlichungen der Historischen Kommission für Pommern (in German). Vol. 41 (2 ed.). Köln/Weimar: Böhlau. ISBN 978-3-412-20436-5.
- Schultze, Johannes (1964). Forschungen zur brandenburgischen und preußischen Geschichte. Veröffentlichungen der Historischen Kommission zu Berlin beim Friedrich-Meinecke-Institut der Freien Universität Berlin (in German). Vol. 13. Walter de Gruyter. ISBN 3-11-000457-7.
- Stülzebach, Annett (1998). "Vampir- und Wiedergängererscheinungen aus volkskundlicher und archäologischer Sicht" (PDF). Concilium Medii Aevi (in German) (1): 97–121.
