= Radhošť (disambiguation) =

Radhošť is a mountain in the Beskydy mountains of the Czech Republic.

Radhošť may also refer to:

- Radhošť (Ústí nad Orlicí District), a village in the Czech Republic
- Radhost, volumes of Czech articles and essays by František Palacký published 1871–1873

== See also ==
- Rethra (also known as Radagoszcz, Radegost, Radigast, Redigast, Radgosc and other forms)
- Radegast (disambiguation)
