= Warnabi =

West Slavic ethnic group

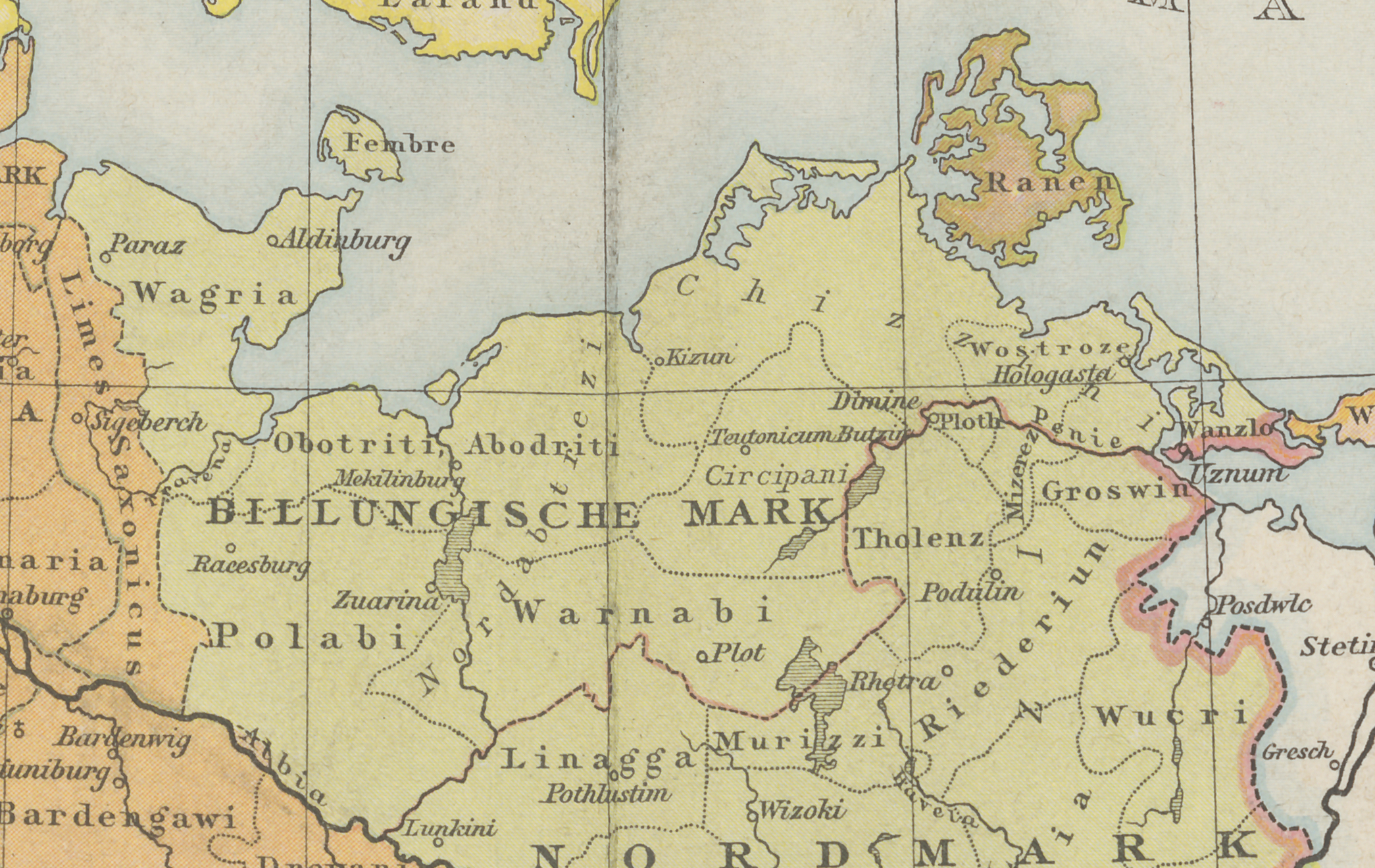
A map of the Billung March showing the location of the Warnabi.

The Warnabi, Warnavi, Warnahi, Wranovi, Wranefzi, Wrani, Varnes, or Warnower were a West Slavic tribe of the Obotrite confederation in the ninth through eleventh centuries. They were one of the minor tribes of the confederation living in the Billung Mark on the eastern frontier of the Holy Roman Empire. They were first mentioned by Adam of Bremen.

Etymologically their name is related to the river, the Warnow (also Warnof, Wrana, or Wranava), along which they settled in the region of Mecklenburg. It may have meant "crow river" or "black river" in their Slavic language, or been derived from the name of the Warni (from earlier warjan), a Germanic people who had previously lived in the same area. The name Warnabi may be a combination of Warni and Abodriti. In Lithuanian language Varna -Varnas, Varnai - Varnos (plural) means Crow.

In the second half of the ninth century the chief town of the Warnabi was on an island in Lake Sternberg at the site of the castle of Gross Raden. The centre of their culture was near the present towns Sternberg and Malchow. From 1171, 1185, and 1186 there are references to the land of the Warnabi: the Warnowe. In 1189 it is called the Warnonwe and by 1222 this was called the Wornawe.

== See also ==
- List of medieval Slavic tribes

== Sources ==
- Howorth, H. H. "The Spread of the Slaves. Part III. The Northern Serbs or Sorabians and the Obodriti." The Journal of the Anthropological Institute of Great Britain and Ireland, Vol. 9. (1880), pp 181–232.
- WARNOWER at Lexikon des Mittelaters.
