= Slavic revolt of 983 =

Late 10th-century uprising of ethnic Slavs in the Holy Roman Empire

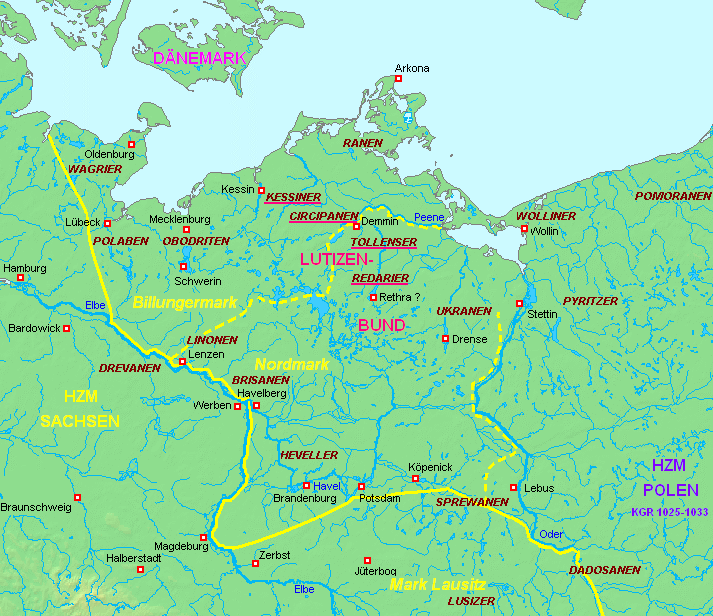
Territory of Lutici federation after 983, beyond the eastern border of the German kingdom (outlined in yellow)

In the Slavic revolt of 983, Polabian Slavs, Wends, Lutici and Obotrite tribes, that lived east of the Elbe River in modern north-east Germany overthrew an assumed Ottonian rule over the Slavic lands and rejected Christianization under Emperor Otto I.

== Background ==
The Slavic peoples between the Elbe and the Baltic coast had been conquered and nominally converted to Christianity in the campaigns of the German king Henry the Fowler and his son Otto I, who in 962 was crowned Holy Roman emperor. Otto had most recently defeated an alliance of Obotrite and Circipani tribes at the 955 Battle on the Raxa. The conquered area east of the German Duchy of Saxony was initially organized within the vast Saxon Eastern March under Margrave Gero, but divided into smaller marches upon his death in 965.

In order to stabilize his rule, Otto promoted the conversion of the Slavic population, establishing the bishoprics of Havelberg and Brandenburg in 948, followed by the Archbishopric of Magdeburg in 968, which in particular carried out active missionary work.

== Uprising ==
In 981 Archbishop Adalbert of Magdeburg, the Apostle of the Slavs, died and his successor Gisilher had to struggle with the resistance by the Magdeburg chapter. He was backed by Emperor Otto II, who, however, was on campaign in Italy, where he suffered a disastrous defeat against the Sicilian Kalbids in the 982 Battle of Stilo and died the next year without having returned to Germany, leaving his minor son Otto III under the tutelage of the Empresses Theophanu and Adelaide.

While there was internal dissention in the Holy Roman Empire, Slavic forces led by the Lutici revolted and drove out the political and religious representatives of the Empire. Starting from the Slavic sanctuary at Rethra, the bishops' seat of Havelberg on 29 June 983 was occupied and plundered, followed by Brandenburg three days later and numerous settlements up to the Tanger River in the west. According to the contemporary chronicler Thietmar of Merseburg, the Obotrites joined the Lutici, devastated a St Lawrence monastery in Kalbe, the bishopric of Oldenburg and even assaulted Hamburg.

A hastily assembled Saxon army was only able to retain the Slavs behind the Elbe. The Northern March and the Billung March were lost. The March of Lusatia as well as the adjacent marches of Zeitz, Merseburg and the Meissen in the south did not take part in the uprising.

== Aftermath ==
From 985, several princes of the Empire carried out annual campaigns together with the Christian Polish princes Mieszko I and Bolesław the Brave to subjugate the area, however these campaigns were unsuccessful. In 1003 King Henry II of Germany tried a different approach: he allied himself with the Lutici and waged war against Bolesław. This stabilized the independence of the Lutici and ensured that the area remained ruled by Polabian Slavs and unchristianized into the 12th century.

The immediate consequences of the uprising were an almost complete stop on further German eastward expansion for the next 200 years. For most of the time, the dioceses of Brandenburg and Havelberg existed in titular form only, with the bishops residing at the royal court. Only in the 12th century after the Wendish Crusade of 1147 and the establishment of the Margraviate of Brandenburg under the Ascanian prince Albert the Bear in 1157, the settlements east of the Elbe were resumed; followed by the northern lands of Mecklenburg, where after several years of fighting against the Obotrite prince Niklot, his son Pribislav in 1167 declared himself a vassal of the Saxon Duke Henry the Lion.

== Bibliography ==
- Wolfgang Fritze: Der slawische Aufstand von 983 - eine Schicksalswende in der Geschichte Mitteleuropas. In: Eckart Henning, Werner Vogel (ed.): Festschrift der landesgeschichtlichen Vereinigung für die Mark Brandenburg zu ihrem hundertjährigen Bestehen 1884–1984. Berlin 1984, pp. 9–55.
- Herbert Ludat: An Elbe und Oder um das Jahr 1000. Skizzen zur Politik des Ottonenreiches und der slawischen Mächte in Mitteleuropa. Cologne 1971, ISBN 3-412-07271-0.
- Christian Lübke: Slawenaufstand. In: Lexikon des Mittelalters. vol. 7, col. 2003f.
- Lutz Partenheimer: Die Entstehung der Mark Brandenburg. Mit einem lateinisch-deutschen Quellenanhang. Cologne/Weimar/Vienna 2007 (with sources material on the Slav Rising pp. 98–103), ISBN 3-412-17106-9.
