= Radegast =

Radegast may also refer to:

- Radegast, Saxony-Anhalt, a small town in Germany
- Radegast (god), a Slavic god
- Radegast (medieval settlement), also known as Radgosc or Rethra, an ancient Slavic town in Mecklenburg
- Radegast (beer), a Czech beer
- Radegast (Stepenitz), a river of Mecklenburg-Vorpommern, Germany
- Radegast train station, a former train station which has been transformed into a Holocaust memorial, located in the Polish city of Łódź

== See also ==
- Radgosc, a historical Lutician city
- Radagast, a fictional character in The Hobbit and The Lord of the Rings
- Radagaisus, a Gothic king, sometimes spelled Rhadagast
- Radhošť (disambiguation)
