= Billung March =

Frontier region of the Duchy of Saxony (936–983)

Territorial scope of the Billung March (red) as proposed by the traditional 19th century historiography

The Billung March (German: Billunger Mark) or March of the Billungs (Mark der Billunger) is a historiographical term, derived from the name of the House of Billung, a prominent German noble family from Saxony, whose members held highest offices in the Duchy of Saxony from the first half of the 10th century up to the beginning of the 12th century. The term Billung March was coined in later historiography, as a descriptive designation for a proposed march (frontier region) that existed in the middle of the 10th century, as assumed by various scholars, in regions to the northeast of the Saxon duchy, across the lower Elbe river, encompassing various territories of Polabian Slavs, and headed by Hermann Billung (d. 973) as a margrave. Newer scholarly analyses have shown that such assumptions were lacking confirmation in reliable primary sources, since Hermann Billung was the royal governor of the Duchy of Saxony and a military commander who was entrusted with the defense of Saxon eastern regions and borders towards the neighboring Slavic tribes, but sources on his occasional endeavors in those Slavic lands do not support the claim that an effective frontier province (march) was created at that time.

== Traditional views ==
The march reached from the Elbe River to the Baltic Sea and from the Limes Saxoniae to the Peene River in the east, roughly the territory of present-day eastern Holstein, Mecklenburg, and parts of Western Pomerania. German expansion into the region of the Billung March was "natural" and the settlement "true colonisation." This can be contrasted with the military occupation of the Marca Geronis, the great march of Gero to the south of the Billungs.

The Billung March was formed in 936, when Otto II, Duke of Saxony and King of East Francia, made Hermann Billung princeps militiae (margrave, literally "prince of the militia"), granting him control of the border with rule over the West Slavic Obotrite tribes, including the Polabians, Warnabi and Wagri, as well as the Redarii, Circipani, and Kissini tribes of the Veleti confederation, and the Danes, who had repeatedly campaigned the territory. Major parts of the land of the Liutizi and the Hevelli lay beyond Hermann's sphere in the Marca Geronis.

The Slavs of this region were often mutually hostile and so no organised resistance was met. Nevertheless, in 955 the Obotrite chief Nako took the chance and allied with Hermann's nephews, the Saxon counts Wichmann the Younger and Egbert the One-Eyed in their domestic quarrel with their uncle. Their open revolt culminated in the Battle on the Recknitz, where the Obotrites were completely defeated by King Otto's troops.

Hermann was given a great deal of autonomy in his march and he is sometimes called the "Duke of Saxony", a title which was actually held by Otto, because of the great deal of authority the king delegated to him as his deputy. The disjointedness of the Germanisation of the eastern marches led to many centuries of warfare; the Roman Catholic Church, however, "more foresighted than the crown ... made use of the tithe in the colonial lands from the very beginning."

Like the adjacent Northern March, the March of Billung was finally abandoned following the uprising of the Obotrites and Veleti in 983.

== See also ==
- Duchy of Saxony
- Polabian Slavs

== Sources ==
- Bachrach, Bernard S.; Bachrach, David S., eds. (2014). Widukind of Corvey: Deeds of the Saxons. Washington: The Catholic University of America Press.
- Rotter, Ekkehart; Schneidmüller, Bernd, eds. (1981). Widukind von Corvey: Res gestae Saxonicae: Die Sachsengeschichte. Stuttgart: Reclam.
- Stieldorf, Andrea (2026) [2012]. Marken und Markgrafen: Studien zur Grenzsicherung durch die fränkisch-deutschen Herrscher (2nd ed.). Wiesbaden: Harrassowitz Verlag.
- Thompson, James Westfall. Feudal Germany, Volume II: New East Frontier Colonial Germany. New York: Frederick Ungar, 1928.
- Trillmich, Werner, ed. (1957). Thietmar von Merseburg: Chronik. Darmstadt: Wissenschaftliche Buchgesellschaf.
- Warner, David A., ed. (2001). Ottonian Germany: The Chronicon of Thietmar of Merseburg. Manchester and New York: Manchester University Press.
