= Slavic rebellion of 1066 =

The Slavic rebellion of 1066 was a pagan reaction to the spread of Christianity among the Obodrites. It was the third of three major pagan uprisings among the West Slavs against Christianity and its German supporters after the revolt of 983 and that of 1018. It was the most effective of the three.

It began with the assassination of Prince Gottschalk on 7 June 1066. This took place in Lenzen. According to Adam of Bremen, a priest named Yppo was "sacrificed on the altar". Several other clergy and laity were also killed. At Ratzeburg on 15 July, a monk named Ansver was stoned to death. Gottschalk's widow, Sigrid, was forced out of Mecklenburg naked along with the other Christians. She and her son, Henry, took refuge at the court of her father, Sven Estridsen.

Bishop John of Mecklenburg was captured in that city and held for a special triumph. He was beaten and led through various cities to be mocked before, in Rethra, his hands, feet and head were cut off. According to Adam, his body was thrown into the street or perhaps into the square in front of the temple. His head was affixed to a pole and offered to the god Radigast on 10 November 1066. According to Adam, the pagan Blusso, who was married to Gottschalk's sister, was responsible for much of the rebellion.

The rebels rejected Gottschalk's eldest son, Budivoj, as prince and chose instead Kruto. Budivoj regained his throne with the help of the Saxon duke Ordulf.

== Bibliography ==
=== Primary sources ===
- Adam of Bremen (2002) [1959]. History of the Archbishops of Hamburg-Bremen. Translated by Francis J. Tschan. Columbia University Press.
- Helmold of Bosau (1966) [1935]. The Chronicle of the Slavs. Translated by Francis J. Tschan. Octagon Books. Originally published by Columbia University Press.

=== Secondary sources ===
- Rosik, Stanisław (2020). The Slavic Religion in the Light of 11th- and 12th-Century German Chronicles (Thietmar of Merseburg, Adam of Bremen, Helmold of Bosau): Studies on the Christian Interpretation of Pre-Christian Cults and Beliefs in the Middle Ages. Translated by Anna Tyszkiewicz. Brill. doi:10.1163/9789004331488.
- Stone, Gerald (2016). Slav Outposts in Central European History: The Wends, Sorbs and Kashubs. Bloomsbury.
- Thompson, James Westfall (1928). Feudal Germany, Volume II: New East Frontier Colonial Germany. Frederick Ungar.
