= West Slavs =

Subgroup of Slavic peoples

Słowianie zachodni (Polish) Západní Slované (Czech) Západní Slovania (Slovak) Западни Слованя (Pannonian Rusyn) Zôpôdni Słowiónie (Kashubian) Pódwjacorne Słowjany (Lower Sorbian) Zapadni Słowjenjo (Upper Sorbian) Zachodniy Słowjońe (Silesian)
- Countries where a West Slavic language is the national language Countries where other Slavic languages are the national language

Total population
- c. 80 million

Regions with significant populations
- Majority: Czech Republic, Poland, Slovakia; Minority: Austria, Balkan states, Baltic states, Belarus, Germany, Russia, Ukraine

Religion
- Catholicism (majority among Poles, Slovaks, Silesians, Kashubians, Moravians, and Sorbs and minority among Czechs); Protestantism (minority among Slovaks and Sorbs); Irreligion (majority among Czechs); Eastern Orthodoxy (minority among Czechs, Poles and Slovaks)

Related ethnic groups
- Other Slavs

The West Slavs are Slavic peoples who speak the West Slavic languages. They separated from the common Slavic group around the 7th century, and established independent polities in Central Europe by the 8th to 9th centuries. The West Slavic languages diversified into their historically attested forms over the 10th to 14th centuries.

Today, groups which speak West Slavic languages include the Poles, Czechs, Slovaks, Silesians, Kashubians, and Sorbs. From the ninth century onwards, most West Slavs converted to Roman Catholicism, thus coming under the cultural influence of the Latin Church, adopting the Latin alphabet, and tending to be more closely integrated into cultural and intellectual developments in western Europe than the East Slavs, who converted to Eastern Orthodox Christianity and adopted the Cyrillic alphabet.

Linguistically, the West Slavic group can be divided into three subgroups: Lechitic, including Polish, Silesian, Kashubian, and the extinct Polabian and Pomeranian languages; Sorbian in the region of Lusatia; and Czecho–Slovak in the Czech lands.

== History ==
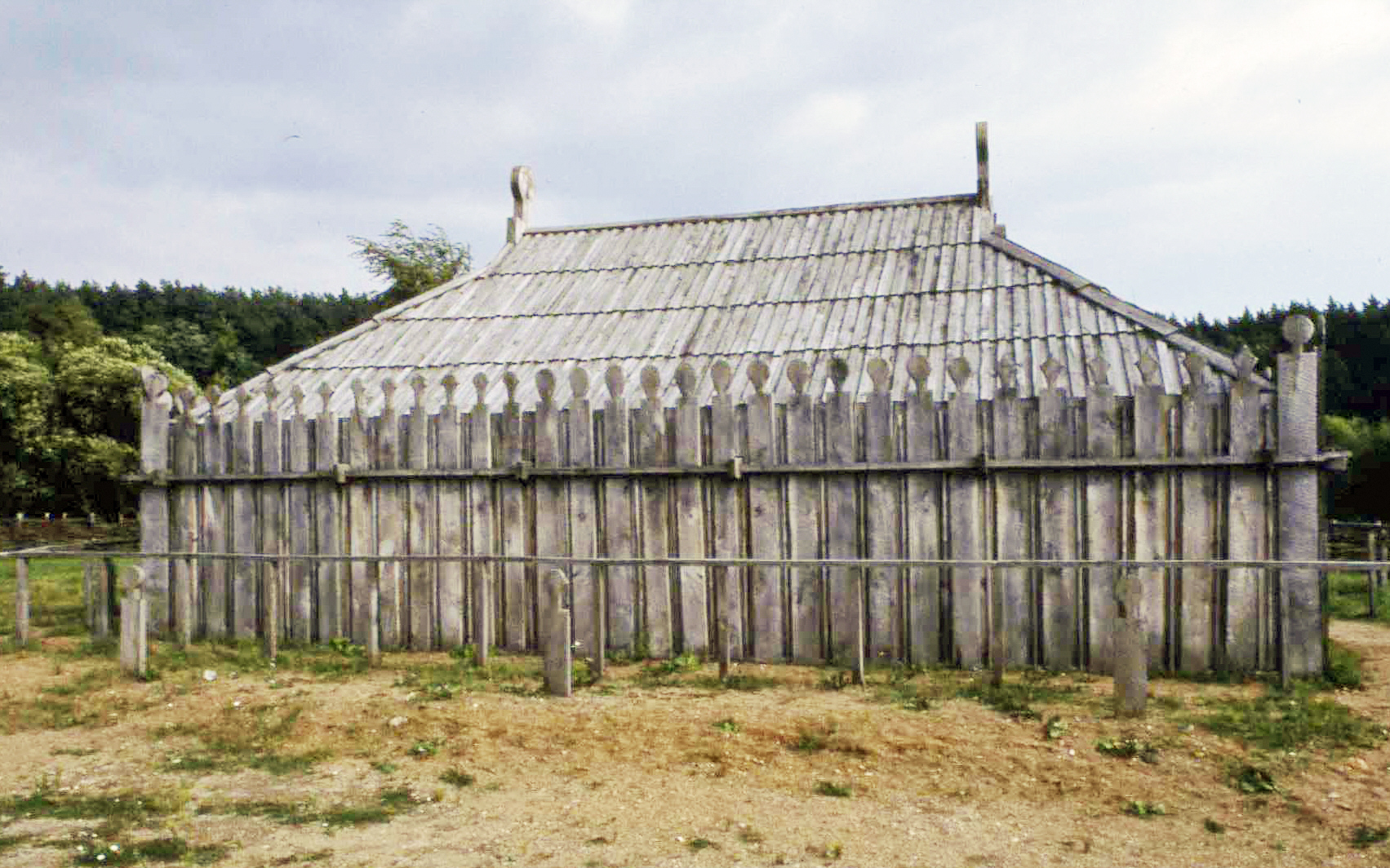
Reconstruction of the Slavic temple in Groß Raden

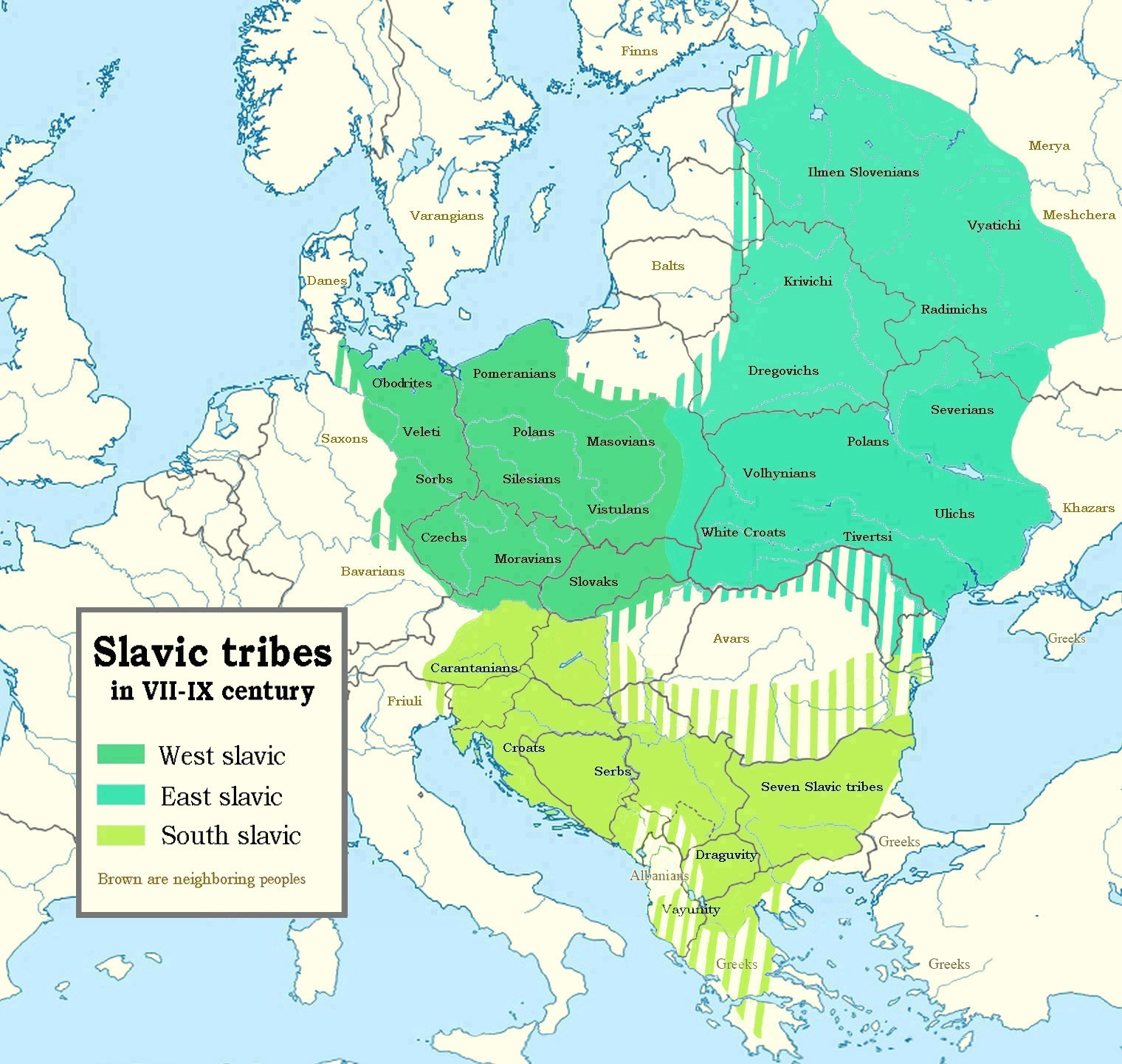
Slavic tribes from the 7th to 9th centuries AD in Europe

In the Early Middle Ages, the name "Wends" (probably derived from the Roman-era Veneti) may have applied to Slavic peoples. However, sources such as the Chronicle of Fredegar and Paul the Deacon are neither clear nor consistent in their ethnographic terminology, and whether "Wends" or "Veneti" refer to Slavic people, pre-Slavic people, or to a territory rather than a population, is a matter of scholarly debate.

The early Slavic expansion reached Central Europe in the 7th century, and the West Slavic dialects diverged from common Slavic over the following centuries. The West Slavic tribes settled on the eastern fringes of the Carolingian Empire, along the Limes Saxoniae. Prior to the Magyar invasion of Pannonia in the 890s, the West Slavic polity of Great Moravia spanned much of Central Europe between what is now Eastern Germany and Western Romania. In the high medieval period, the West Slavic tribes were again pushed to the east by the incipient German Ostsiedlung, decisively so following the Wendish Crusade in the 11th century.

The early Slavic expansion began in the 5th century, and by the 6th century the groups that would become the West, East, and South Slavic groups had probably become geographically separated. One of the distinguishing features of the West Slavic tribes was manifested in the structure of the Pagan sanctuaries of the closed (long) type, while the East Slavic sanctuaries had a round (most often open) shape (see also: Peryn). Early modern historiographers, such as Penzel (1777) and Palacky (1827) have claimed Samo's Empire to be first independent Slavic state in history by taking Fredegar's Wendish account at face value. Curta (1997) argued that the text is not as straightforward: according to Fredegar, Wends were a gens, Sclavini merely a genus, and there was no "Slavic" gens. He further states that "Wends occur particularly in political contexts: the Wends, not the Slavs, made Samo their king."

Other such alleged early West Slavic states include the Principality of Moravia (8th century–833), the Principality of Nitra (8th century–833), and Great Moravia (833–c. 907). Christiansen (1997) identified the following West Slav tribes in the 11th century from "the coastlands and hinterland from the aby of Kiel to the Vistula, including the islands of Fehmarn, Poel, Rügen, Usedom and Wollin", namely the Wagrians, Obodrites (or Abotrites), the Polabians, the Liutizians or Wilzians, the Rugians or Rani, the Sorbs, the Lusatians, the Poles, and the Pomeranians (later divided into Pomerelians and Cassubians). They came under the domination of the Holy Roman Empire after the Wendish Crusade in the Middle Ages and had been strongly assimilated by Germans at the end of the 19th century. The Polabian language survived until the beginning of the 19th century in what is now the German state of Lower Saxony.

== Groupings ==
Various attempts have been made to group the West Slavs into subgroups according to various criteria, including geography, historical tribes, and linguistics.

=== Bavarian Geographer grouping ===
In 845 the Bavarian Geographer made a list of West Slavic tribes who lived in the areas of modern-day Poland, Czech Republic, Germany and Denmark:

Pos.	Latin name in 845	English name	no. of gords
1	Nortabtrezi	North Obotrites	53
2	Uuilci	Veleti	95
7	Hehfeldi	Hevellians	8
14	Osterabtrezi	East Obotrites	100
15	Miloxi	Milceni	67
16	Phesnuzi	Besunzane	70
17	Thadesi	Dadosesani	200
18	Glopeani	Goplans	400
33	Lendizi	Lendians	98
34	Thafnezi	/	257
36	Prissani	Prissani	70
37	Uelunzani	Wolinians	70
38	Bruzi		/
48	Uuislane	Vistulans	/
49	Sleenzane	Silesians	15
50	Lunsizi	Sorbs	30
51	Dadosesani	Thadesi	20
52	Milzane	Milceni	30
53	Besunzane	Phesnuzi	2
56	Lupiglaa	Łupigoła	30
57	Opolini	Opolans	20
58	Golensizi	Golensizi	5

=== Tribal grouping ===
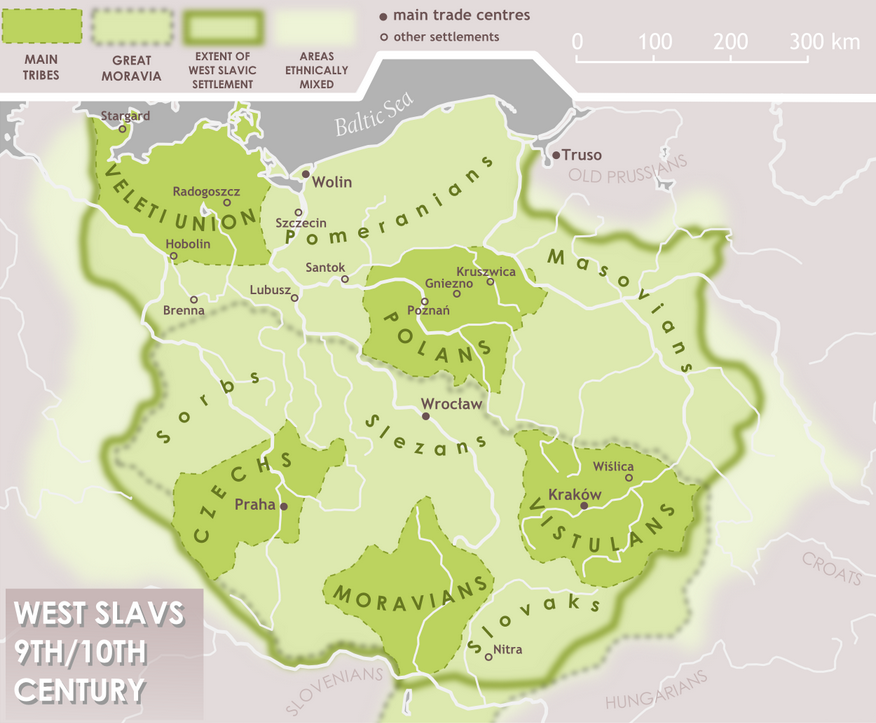
West Slav tribes in the 9th and 10th centuries

- Lechitic group
  - Poles
  - Masovians
  - Polans
  - Lendians
  - Vistulans
  - Silesians
  - Pomeranians
    - Slovincians
    - Kashubians
  - Polabians
    - Obodrites/Abodrites
      - Obotrites proper
      - Wagrians
      - Warnower
      - Polabians proper
      - Linonen
      - Travnjane
      - Drevani
    - Veleti (Wilzi), succeeded by Lutici (Liutici)
      - Kissini (Kessiner, Chizzinen, Kyzziner)
      - Circipani (Zirzipanen)
      - Tollensians
      - Redarier
    - Ucri (Ukr(an)i, Ukranen)
    - Rani (Rujani)
    - Hevelli (Stodorani)
    - Volinians (Velunzani)
    - Pyritzans (Prissani)
- Czech–Slovak group
  - Czechs
  - Moravians
  - Slovaks
- Sorbian group
  - Milceni (Upper Sorbs)
  - Lusatian Sorbs (Lower Sorbs)

=== Linguistic grouping ===
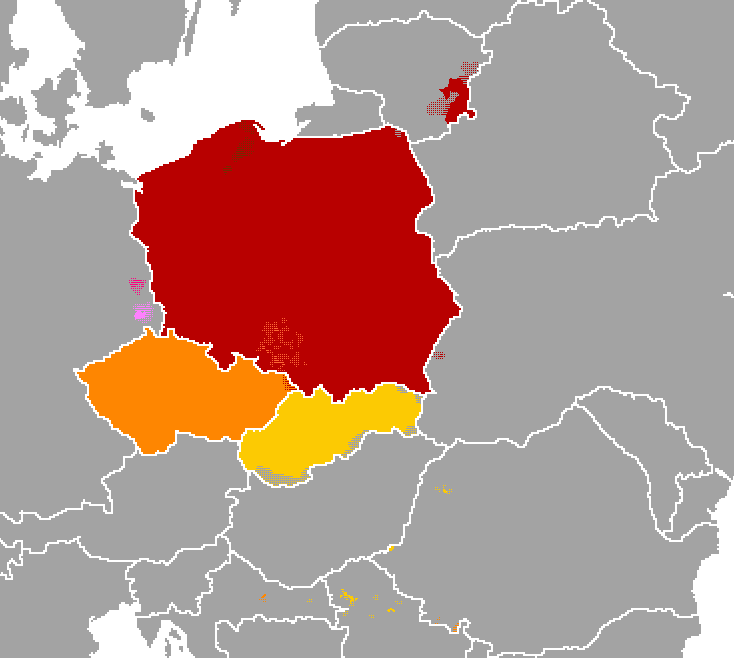
West Slavic Languages

- Lechitic group
  - Polans
  - Lendians
  - Silesians
  - Wends
  - Sorbs
  - Vistulans
  - Polabians
  - Obodrites
  - Slovincians
  - Kashubians
  - Gorals
- Czech–Slovak group
  - Czechs
    - Bohemians
    - Moravians
  - Slovaks

== See also ==
- Slavic peoples
- List of Slavic studies journals
- Czechization
- Polonization
- Slovakization
- East Slavs
- South Slavs
- Outline of Slavic history and culture

== Bibliography ==
- Gołąb, Zbigniew (1992). The Origins of the Slavs: A Linguist's View. Columbus, Ohio: Slavica Publishers. pp. 12–13.
- Curta, Florin (1997). "Slavs in Fredegar and Paul the Deacon: medieval gens or 'scourge of God'?" (PDF). Early Medieval Europe. 6 (2). Blackwell Publishers: 141–167. doi:10.1111/1468-0254.00009. S2CID 162269231. "While being traditionally regarded, at least in Polish historiography, as forefathers of the western Slavs, and therefore successors of the Veneti mentioned by Pliny, Tacitus, or Claudius Ptolemaeus, recent studies argue that the name may have not been a self-designation. By calling the Slavs 'Wends', German-speaking groups may have alluded to a pre-Slavic population. It is, however, not clear how an ancient terminology came to be used in the case of the early medieval Slavs. (...) [There may be] a meaning behind Fredegar's presumably inconsistent ethnic vocabulary. Perhaps 'Wends' and 'Sclavenes' are meant to denote a specific social and political configuration, in which such concepts as 'state' or 'ethnicity' are relevant, while 'Slavs' is a more general term, used in a territorial rather than an ethnic sense; Samo as a merchant went in Sclauos to do business..."
- Sergey Skorvid (2015). Yury Osipov (ed.). Slavic languages. Great Russian Encyclopedia (in 35 vol.) Vol. 30. pp. 396–397–389. Archived from the original on 2019-09-04.
- Ilya Gavritukhin, Vladimir Petrukhin (2015). Yury Osipov (ed.). Slavs. Great Russian Encyclopedia (in 35 vol.) Vol. 30. pp. 388–389. Archived from the original on 2022-08-03.
- Sedov, Vasili (1953). "Drevneslavănskoe yazyčeskoe svătilişe v Peryni". Kratkie Soobşeniă Instituta Istorii Materialnoy Kultury (in Russian) (50): 92–103.
