= Radener See =

Lake in Germany

- Location within Mecklenburg-Vorpommern
- Location: Rostock, Mecklenburg-Vorpommern
- Coordinates: 53°46′28.88″N 12°26′58.45″E
- Primary inflows: Wotrumer Bach
- Primary outflows: Aalbach, also known as Lößnitz (Nebel)
- Basin countries: Germany
- Max. length: 2.1 km (1.3 mi)
- Max. width: 0.8 km (0.50 mi)
- Surface area: 1.2 km^{2} (0.46 sq mi)
- Surface elevation: 24.4 m (80 ft)

Radener See is a lake in the Rostock district in Mecklenburg-Vorpommern, Germany. At an elevation of 24.4 m, its surface area is 1.2 km^{2}.
