= John Scotus (bishop of Mecklenburg) =

Bishop of Mecklenburg

John Scotus (approx. A.D. 990 – 10 November 1066) was a Bishop of Mecklenburg from Scotland. It is likely this John can be identified as the John who was allegedly made Bishop of Glasgow sometime between 1055 and 1060 and possibly the same John allegedly holding the title of Bishop of Orkney.

From approximately 500 AD Slavonic tribes arrived in Mecklenburg. By about 600, they had complete possession of the land. The chief god was Radegast Zuarasici, whose sanctuary at Rethra was the centre of his worship for the whole of Mecklenburg. Charlemagne's conquests in this region were lost soon after his death. Henry I of Germany (916–36) was the first to force the Slavonic territory again to pay tribute (c. 928); he also placed it under the jurisdiction of Saxon counts. With the dominion of the Germans, Christianity found ingress into the land. However, antagonism to the tribute to the empire and the Saxon dukes led to a heathen reaction.

He was killed in 1066 during a Wendish revolt against Christianity, when he was sacrificed to Radegast, the god of hospitality.

He is venerated as a saint in the Roman Catholic Church, and by some Eastern Orthodox Christians.

== Sources ==
- Watt, D. E. R., Fasti Ecclesiae Scotinanae Medii Aevi ad annum 1638, 2nd Draft, (St Andrews, 1969), p. 144
- Julius Wiggers: Kirchengeschichte Mecklenburgs, Verlag der Hinstorffśchen Hofbuchhandlung, 1840, pp. 24/25 Internet Archive
- Johannes Scotus, S. (152) in: Vollständiges Heiligen-Lexikon, Band 3. Augsburg 1869, p. 268 Zeno.org
- Alfred Rische: Verzeichnis der bischöfe und Domherren von Schwerin mit biographischen Bemerkungen. Ludwigslust, 1900.
- Josef Traeger: Johannes I., Scotus, ca. 1062-1066 in: Die Bischöfe des mittelalterlichen Bistums Schwerin, Leipzig: Benno 1984, pp. 16–18
- Grewolls, Grete (2011). Wer war wer in Mecklenburg und Vorpommern. Das Personenlexikon (in German). Rostock: Hinstorff Verlag. p. 4691. ISBN 978-3-356-01301-6.

== See also ==
- Lutici

Johannes Scotus Born: ca. 990 Died: 10 November 1066
Catholic Church titles
New title new diocese	Bishop of Mecklenburg as John I 1053–1066	Vacant Title next held by Eberhard
Preceded by Magsuen	Bishop of Glasgow; 1055/1060–1066	Vacant Title next held by Michael
