= Radogoszcz =

Radogoszcz may refer to the following places in Poland:

- Radogoszcz, Lower Silesian Voivodeship (south-west Poland)
- Radogoszcz, Pomeranian Voivodeship (north Poland)
- Radogoszcz prison in Nazi-occupied Lodz
- Radegast station (in Polish: Radogoszcz), railway station built by the Nazis at the outskirts of the Lodz ghetto
- Radogoszcz, Łódź -district (part) of Łódź
- Radgosc
