= Kessinians =

Medieval West Slavic tribe from northeastern Germany

The Kessinians, also known as Kessini, Chizzini, Kcynianie and Chyżanie, were a medieval West Slavic tribe in what is now northeastern Germany. They inhabited the territory between the Warnow and Recknitz rivers, today split between the districts of Rostock and Vorpommern-Rügen in Mecklenburg-Vorpommern. Their capital and name-giving stronghold was a gard near modern Kessin east of Rostock. Linguistically, they belonged to the Polabian Slavs.

Since the Slavic settlement of the region in the 8th and 9th centuries, the area was inhabited by the Veleti. The area became part of the Billung march of the Holy Roman Empire's Duchy of Saxony in 936. In the course of a successful uprising in 983, the Veleti made a transition to the Lutician federation, an alliance of several tribes based in Radgosc (Rethra). The Kessinians emerged as the northernmost of four tribes constituting the core of the federation, with the other three being Circipanes, Redarians, and Tollensians.

In 1056/57, the alliance broke apart due to internal struggles between these four tribes. The western neighbors of the Kessinians, the Obodrites, took advantage of the resulting civil war and subdued the Kessinians along with the Circipanes. Integrated in the Obodrite state during the following decades, the Kessinians lost their self-determination. However, overlordship of the Obodrite nobility backed by Saxons and Danes was not always accepted, as shown by two expeditions of Saxon duke Lothar von Supplinburg, who subdued the Kessinan prince Dumar and his son in 1114, and another Kessinian prince, Sventipolk, in 1121. The Circipanes, former Lutician allies of the Kessinians, are reported to have actively participated in the 1114 expedition with 300 light cavalry.

Finally, the Kessinian remains were assimilated by German settlers during the medieval Ostsiedlung, who turned the successor of the Obodrites' state, the Duchy of Mecklenburg, into a German region during the 12th century.

== See also ==
- List of medieval Slavic tribes

== Sources ==
- Joachim Herrmann, Die Slawen in Deutschland, Akademie-Verlag Berlin, 1985

== See also ==
- Mecklenburg
- Pomerania during the Early Middle Ages
