= Circipania =

Medieval territory in Europe

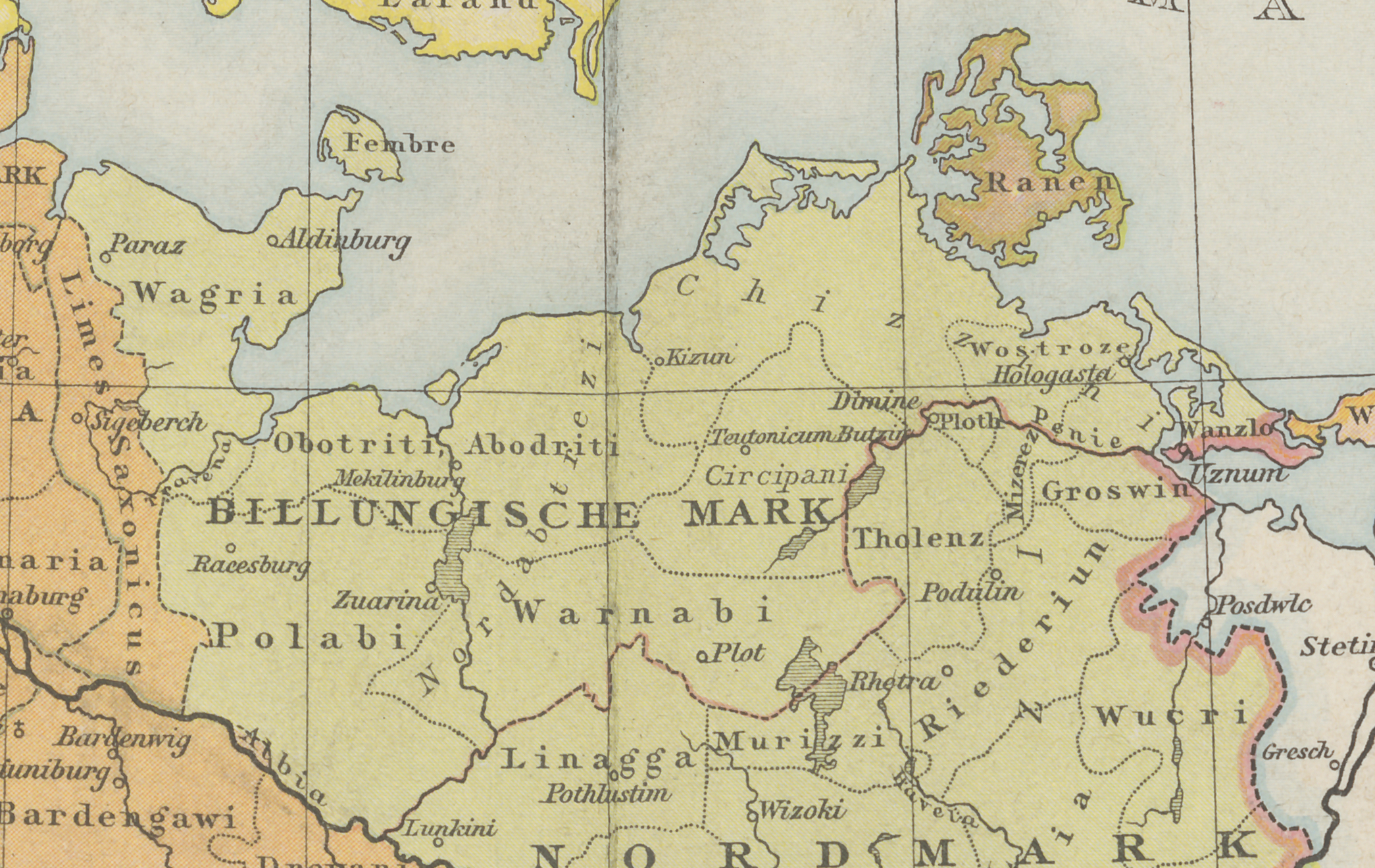
Northern Germany, c. 1000 AD

Circipania (German: Circipanien, Zirzipanien) was a medieval territory in what is now northeastern Germany. The name derives from Latin circum (around), or a prefix derivative from a Proto-Slavic preposition *čerzъ ← *čersъ (across - through), as in Russian čerez/через, Slovene čerź, Serbo-Croatian črëzand and Pane, in Slavic - foam, spume - Belarusian, Serbian пена, Ukrainian піна, Croatian pjena, Slovak, Slovene pena, Czech pěna, Polish piana, (the Peene River). The Slavic name consists of three elements: preffix *čerzъ ← *čersъ - across, root *pena - foam, river name, and suffix *-janinъ, denoting a dweller of a certain place, and in Slavic it may have sounded "Čerzъpienianinъ" in singular, and "Čerzъpienianie" in plural. The region was enclosed roughly by the upper Recknitz, Trebel and Peene rivers, the western border ran east of Güstrow. The region developed in the 10th and 11th centuries, when it was the tribal territory of the Circipanes (German: Circipanen, Zirzipanen), a West Slavic tribe which along with the neighboring tribes was a part of the Lutici federation. The main burghs were Teterow, Malchin, and Demmin.

In 936, the Circipania was incorporated into the Billung March of the Holy Roman Empire. The Circipanes were one of the four constituent tribes of the Lutici federation centered on Rethra, which started a successful uprising in 983. Rid of the empire's overlordship, the Circipanes stayed with the Liutizians until the federation broke apart due to internal struggles in the 1050s, culminating dissolution in 1057. The Redarians and Tollensians opposed the Circipanes and Kessinians struggling for more influence within the federative administration, and allied with the Obodrites. The Obodrites successfully invaded Circipania and made it a province of their realm. The internal struggles had weakened the area, such that in the following year it became the target of numerous expeditions of an expansive Holy Roman Empire during their Wendish Crusade in 1147), then by Denmark in the raid of 1170, and finally by the Duchy of Pomerania which subdued and incorporated the area into Pomerania-Demmin in the late 12th century. The last of the territory was invaded by Mecklenburg and subdued in the early 1230s.

The 1230s marked the end of Circipania as a distinct territory as well as the end of the Circipanes. Pomerania-Demmin was in a miserable position and lost most of the territory to the Margrave of Brandenburg in the Treaty of Kremmen in 1236. Thus, Pomerania-Demmin could not counter the Mecklenburgian advance led by Borwin III of Rostock. Circipania would stay divided with Mecklenburg controlling the western bulk with Güstrow and Teterow, and Pomerania controlling the eastern smaller part around Demmin. Later the Mecklenburg part divided into Mecklenburg-Rostock and Mecklenburg-Werle, and the name Circipania dropped out of use.

Though Circipania vanished as a name from political maps, it was still visible on Roman Catholic ecclesiastic maps as the Pomeranian province of the Diocese of Cammin, because the borders of this province did not differ from that of Circipania and remained as they were before the conquest.

The Circipanes, whose numbers already dwindled due to the previous warfare, were assimilated by the German settlers called in by Wartislaw III, Duke of Pomerania before the Mecklenburg conquest, and by Mecklenburg knights during the Ostsiedlung.

== See also ==
- List of medieval Slavic tribes

== Sources ==
- Werner Buchholz, Pommern, Siedler, 1999, pp. 23ff, ISBN 3-88680-272-8
- Joachim Herrmann et al., Die Slawen in Deutschland
