= Tollensians =

West Slavic tribe

The Tollensians (Latin: Tholenzi, Polish: Dołężanie, Tolężanie, Dolency, Doleczanie) were a West Slavic tribe inhabiting the shores of the lower and middle Tollense (Dołęża) river, after which they were named. They were part of the Veleti/Lutician federation. During the civil war within the federation (1057-1060) the Dołężanie allied with the Redarians against the Kessini and the Circipani. Although the Redarian/Dołężan side was victorious, the devastation caused by the civil war led to the fall of the Lutician federation. In 1110, upon getting news of the defeat of the Holy Roman Emperor Henry V in the German-Polish War of 1109 the Dołężanie and the Redarians rebelled against German authority. The uprising was quelled by Lothair of Supplinburg, who had recently been made Duke of Saxony by Henry.

In the 12th century they were incorporated into the Duchy of Western Pomerania.

== See also ==
- List of medieval Slavic tribes
