= Groß Raden Archaeological Open Air Museum =

Museum in Germany

Coordinates: 53°44′12″N 11°52′41″E

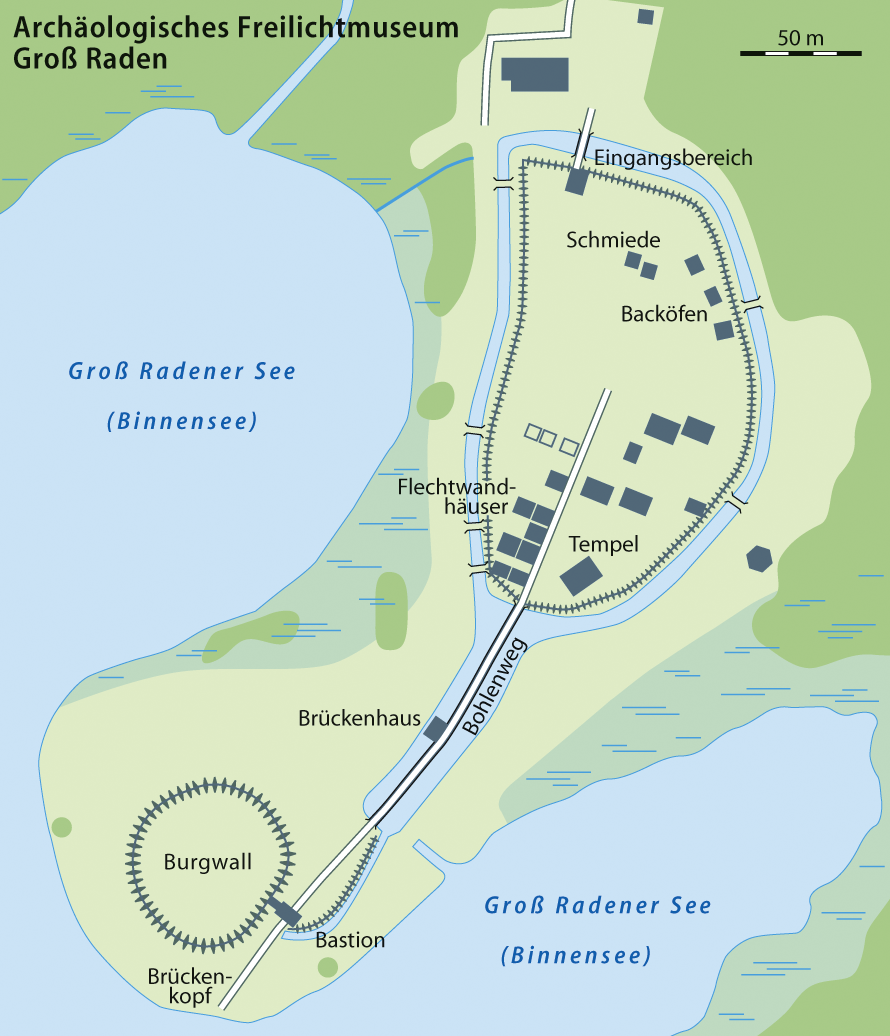
Map of the Groß Raden Open air Museum

Groß Raden Archaeological Open Air Museum

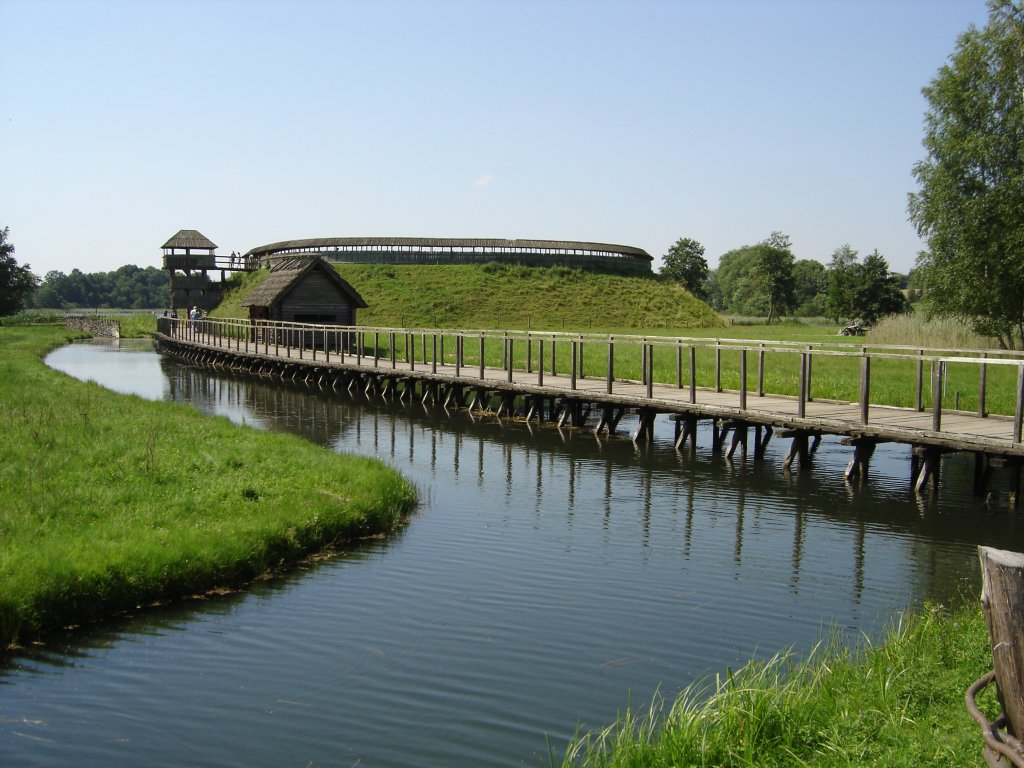
Reconstruction of the site

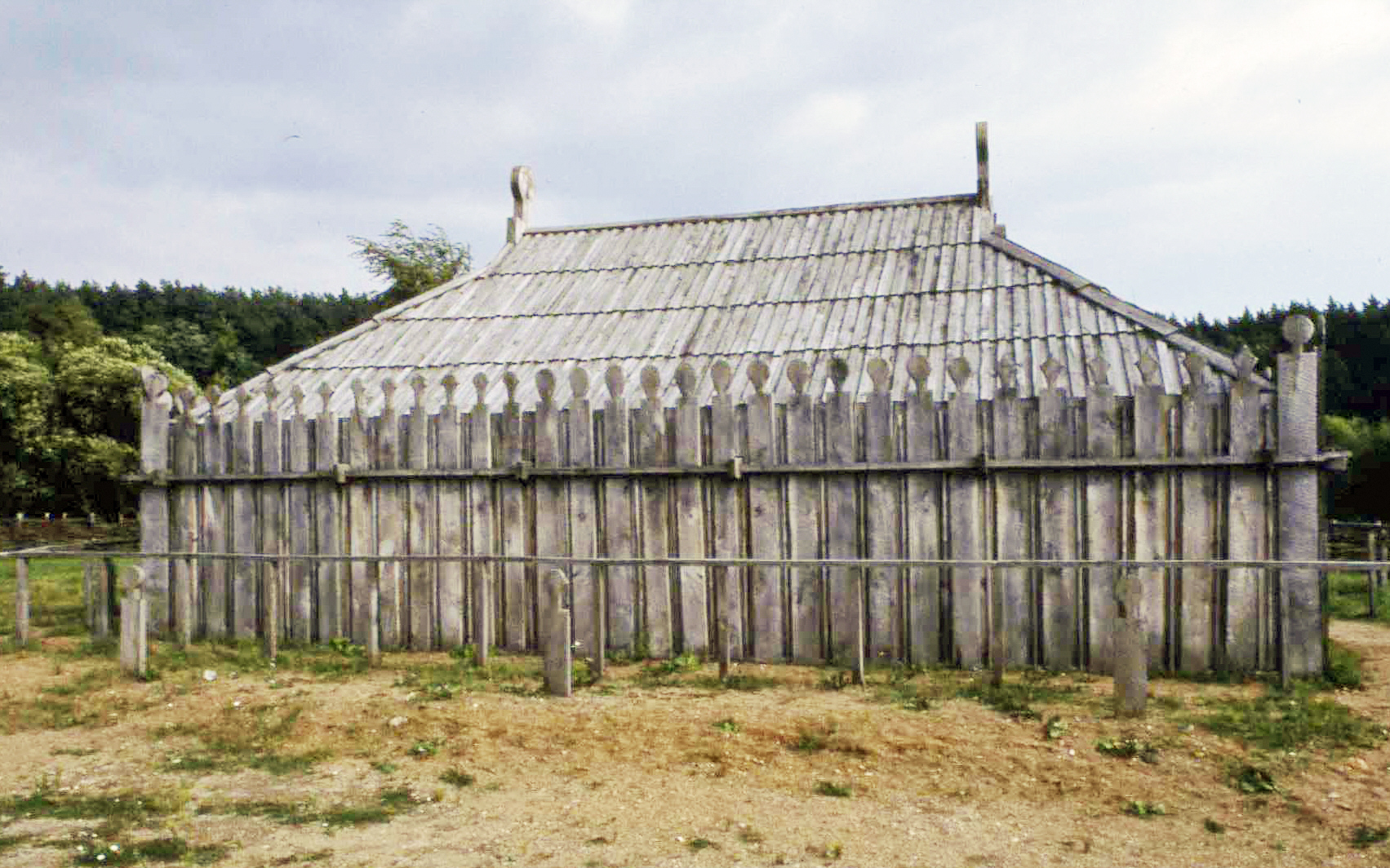
Reconstruction of a Slavic temple

The Groß Raden Archaeological Open Air Museum (German: Archäologische Freilichtmuseum Groß Raden) lies a few kilometres north of the small town of Sternberg and about a kilometre northeast of the village of Groß Raden in the German state of Mecklenburg-Vorpommern. The site is in a depression that borders directly onto the lake of Radener See. On a peninsula in front of that lies its circular castle rampart, visible from afar, which has a diameter of 50 metres. From 1973 to 1980 extensive excavations were carried out here, led by Ewald Schuldt, during the course of which the remnants of a Slavic settlement dating to the 9th and 10th centuries was unearthed. The fort has been reconstructed based on the excavations and established as an archaeological open-air museum. It has been enhanced by finds from the Slavic castle of Behren-Lübchin.

== Literature ==
- Ewald Schuldt, Manfred Jährig: Groß Raden: ein slawischer Tempelort des 9./10. Jahrhunderts in Mecklenburg. in: Schriften zur Ur- und Frühgeschichte 39. Zentralinstitut für Alte Geschichte und Archäologie, Berlin 1985
- Horst Keiling: Archäologisches Freilichtmuseum Gross Raden - Archäologische Funde und Denkmale aus dem Norden der DDR 7. Museum für Ur- u. Frühgeschichte, Schwerin 1988
- Ewald Schuldt: Der eintausendjährige Tempelort Gross Raden: seine Erforschung, wie es dazu kam, und was aus ihm werden soll; der Bericht des Ausgräbers. in: Bildkataloge des Museums für Ur- und Frühgeschichte Schwerin 24. Museum für Ur- und Frühgeschichte, Schwerin 1989

== See also ==
- List of open-air museums in Germany
