= Christian Lübke =

German historian (born 1953)

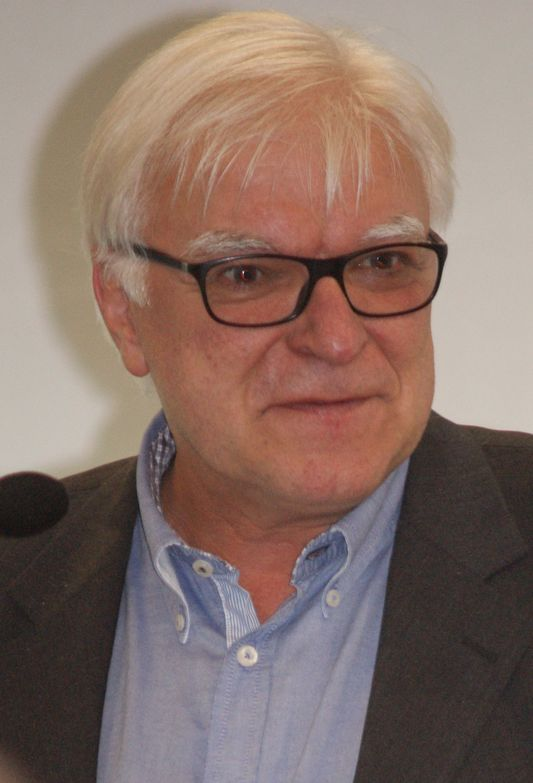
Christian Lübke, photographed in 2016 by Werner Maleczek

Christian Lübke (born 17 December 1953 in Langenhain-Ziegenberg, Hesse) is a German historian.

== Life and career ==
Christian Lübke studied Slavic Studies and Eastern European History at LMU Munich and the University of Giessen from 1972 to 1980. His academic tutor was Herbert Ludat. In 1980, he obtained his doctorate in Giessen with a thesis titled Novgorod in Russian Literature. From 1980 to 1987, he worked as a research assistant at Giessen. He then served as a research assistant at the Friedrich Meinecke Institute at the Free University of Berlin from 1987 to 1992. In 1996, he completed his habilitation with a study on Foreigners in Eastern Europe at the Free University of Berlin. Since 1996, Lübke has been a project manager at the Centre for Humanities in Eastern European History and Culture, now the Leibniz Institute for History and Culture of Eastern Europe in Leipzig.

From 1998 to 2007, Lübke taught as a professor of Eastern European history at the University of Greifswald. From 2007 to 1 November 2021, he was director of the Leibniz Institute for the History and Culture of Eastern Europe and professor of Eastern Central European history at Leipzig University. Lübke is co-editor of the Journal for East Central European Studies and a member of the Historical Commission for Pomerania. In 2009, he was elected a full member of the Saxon Academy of Sciences.

His research focuses on spatial perception, work, and economics in Eastern Central Europe, the history of science, and the history of Germania Slavica. In the 1980s, he contributed to the regesta "On the History of the Slavs on the Elbe and Oder" from 900 to 1057, an initiative led by Herbert Ludat. His studies Fremde im östlichen Europa (Strangers in Eastern Europe) and Das östliche Europa (Eastern Europe) are considered pioneering works for medieval research on Eastern Central Europe in Germany.

== Fonts (selection) ==
=== Monographs ===
- Lübke, Christian (2004). Die Deutschen und das europäische Mittelalter: Das östliche Europa [The Germans and the European Middle Ages: Eastern Europe] (in German). München: Siedler. ISBN 3-88680-760-6.
- Lübke, Christian (2001). Fremde im östlichen Europa. Von Gesellschaften ohne Staat zu verstaatlichten Gesellschaften (9.–11. Jahrhundert) [Strangers in Eastern Europe. From societies without a state to nationalised societies (9th–11th century)]. Ostmitteleuropa in Vergangenheit und Gegenwart (in German). Vol. 23. Köln: Böhlau. ISBN 3-412-16298-1.
- Lübke, Christian (1991). Arbeit und Wirtschaft im östlichen Mitteleuropa. Die Spezialisierung menschlicher Tätigkeit im Spiegel der hochmittelalterlichen Toponymie in den Herrschaftsgebieten von Piasten, Premysliden und Arpaden [Work and Economy in Eastern Central Europe. The Specialisation of Human Activity as Reflected in High Medieval Toponymy in the Domains of the Piasts, Přemyslids and Árpáds]. Glossar zur frühmittelalterlichen Geschichte im östlichen Europa. Beiheft (in German). Vol. 7. Stuttgart: Steiner. ISBN 3-515-05818-4.
- Lübke, Christian (1984). Novgorod in der russischen Literatur (bis zu den Dekabristen) [Novgorod in Russian literature (up to the Decembrists)]. Osteuropastudien der Hochschulen des Landes Hessen. Bd. 1 = Gießener Abhandlungen zur Agrar- und Wirtschaftsforschung des europäischen Ostens (in German). Vol. 130. Berlin: Duncker & Humblot. ISBN 3-428-05609-4.

=== Editorships ===
- Lübke, Christian; Krause, Stephan; Suckow, Dirk (2018). Der Osten ist eine Kugel. Fußball in Kultur und Geschichte des östlichen Europa [The East is a sphere. Football in the culture and history of Eastern Europe] (in German). Göttingen: Verlag Die Werkstatt. ISBN 978-3-7307-0388-5.
- Lübke, Christian; Bünz, Enno; Huschner, Wolfgang (2013). Kolditz, Sebastian (ed.). Italien, Mitteldeutschland, Polen. Geschichte und Kultur im europäischen Kontext vom 10. bis zum 18. Jahrhundert [Italy, Central Germany, Poland. History and culture in the European context from the 10th to the 18th century]. Schriften zur sächsischen Geschichte und Volkskunde (in German). Vol. 42. Leipzig: Leipziger Universitätsverlag. ISBN 978-3-86583-639-7.
- Lübke, Christian; Eberhard, Winfried (2009). Die Vielfalt Europas. Identitäten und Räume [The diversity of Europe. Identities and spaces] (in German). Leipzig: Leipziger Universitätsverlag. ISBN 978-3-86583-382-2.
- Lübke, Christian; Eberhard, Winfried (2010). The Plurality of Europe. Identities and Spaces. Leipzig: Leipziger Universitätsverlag. ISBN 978-3-86583-486-7.
- Lübke, Christian; Harck, Ole (2001). Zwischen Reric und Bornhöved. Die Beziehungen zwischen den Dänen und ihren slawischen Nachbarn vom 9. bis ins 13. Jahrhundert. Beiträge einer internationalen Konferenz, Leipzig, 4.–6. Dezember 1997 [Between Reric and Bornhöved. Relations between the Danes and their Slavic neighbours from the 9th to the 13th century. Contributions from an international conference, Leipzig, 4–6 December 1997]. Forschungen zur Geschichte und Kultur des östlichen Mitteleuropa (in German). Vol. 11. Stuttgart: Steiner. ISBN 978-3-515-07671-5.
- Lübke, Christian (1998). Struktur und Wandel im Früh- und Hochmittelalter. Eine Bestandsaufnahme aktueller Forschungen zur Germania Slavica [Structure and change in the early and high Middle Ages. An overview of current research on Germania Slavica]. Forschungen zur Geschichte und Kultur des östlichen Mitteleuropa (in German). Vol. 5. Stuttgart: Steiner. ISBN 978-3-515-07114-7.
