= Rethra =

Human settlement in Germany

Rethra (also known as Radagoszcz, Radegost, Radigast, Redigast, Radgosc and other forms like Ruthengost) was, in the 10th to the 12th centuries, the main town and political center of the Slavic Redarians, one of the four major Lutician tribes, located most likely in present-day Mecklenburg. It was also a major worship center, devoted to the cult of the Slavic deity Radegast-Swarożyc.

== Etymology ==
The name "Radgosc" (or its close forms) derives from old Slavic and roughly translates as "hospitable" ("radość" or "radi" meaning "glad" or "happy" and "gość" or "gost" meaning "guest").

In Czech, the word "radohostinství" means 'hospitality', and "radovati se" means 'to rejoice'.

Alternately it may be translated as "council hosting", from "rada" (Czech, Polish, Slovak, Ukrainian) - council (also advice, counsel, committee), and "hostit" (Czech "to host"), "goszczący", "gościć" (Polish "hosting", "to host"), and relate to a place, person, or deity hosting the council.

Similar place names (Radhost, Radogoszcz, Radgoszcz) are found in some Slavic countries.

The name Rethra was suggested by T. Witkowski to be a "distorted form" of the name of the Redarians.

== Chronicles ==
Radagosc is described in the chronicles of Thietmar of Merseburg, who used the name Riedegost, while, writing about fifty years later, Adam of Bremen referred to it as Rethra.

Thietmar (VI, 23) described Riedegost as a castle (urbs) with three horns (tricornis) and three gates (tres in se continens portas), two of which could be reached by land, while the third, smallest gate faced a lake (mare) to the east. This complex was surrounded by a virgin forest (silva), and a wooden temple elevated on animal horns was inside. Idols of several pagan deities were there, each of whom had a name engraved and wore helmet and armor, with "Zuarasici" being the highest deity. Guidons (vexilla) of these deities were stored inside the temple and were only to leave the room during a war.

Thietmar wrote his chronicle when the Lutici were allies of the Holy Roman Emperor, an alliance he opposed, and composed his report to advise the Holy Roman Emperor against it. He also explicitly addresses the reader and advises him not to follow the pagan Lutician cult, but instead to adhere to the Holy Bible.

Adam of Bremen wrote his Gesta Hammaburgensis ecclesiae pontificum when Radgosc was already in decline, and gave a somewhat different account: according to him, Radgosc, or "Rethra", "seat of the idols" (sedes ydolatriae) was surrounded by a deep lake and had nine gates. He described Redigast as the superior deity in a large demonic temple (templum ibi magnum constructum est demonibus, princeps est Redigast), that could be reached by a wooden bridge by those who wanted to sacrifice or ask the oracle. The 12th-century chronicler Helmold largely followed Adam's version. The difference in the numbers used by Thietmar ("three", tricornis) and Adam ("nine") might be explained with the symbolic use of these numbers, meant not to accurately describe Radgosc, but rather connect it to the underworld.

The boar, who according to Thietmar came out of the lake before a war to take pleasure in the mud, thereby "terribly shaking and appearing to many", might likewise be a symbol that Thietmar used for the devil rather than an actual oracle, in contrast to the horse oracle.

== Location ==
The precise location of the city is unknown, however, its most likely location is on the islands and in the swamp area of the Lieps and Tollense lakes near Neubrandenburg (see Fischerinsel). Theories that the town might have been at Feldberg, Wanzka Abbey or Gnoien were refuted.

In addition to the disputed location of the place, even the assumption that Thietmar and Adam were writing about the same town has been controversial. This is in part because the main deity worshiped in Riedegost/Rethra was reported as Zuarasici (Swarożyc) by Thietmar (VI, 23), and as Redigost (Redigast, Riedegost) by Adam of Bremen (II, 21; III, 51) as well as the 12th century chronicler Helmold (I, 2).

This is interpreted by historians and linguists in different ways: probably, the different names mark the transition from an appellativum related with the Iranian root xvar, "sun", to a distinct personalized deity with the name Riedegost. This could then have been adopted as the name of the temple in the town and as the name of the tribe settling there (Redarii, Redarians, Redars).

Following the alternative hypothesis, it was the other way around: Adam of Bremen and Helmold mistakenly adopted the name of the temple site as the name of the deity, which was correctly identified by Thietmar and corresponds with Svarožič or Svarog. According to a third theory, Riedegost was the second name of Thietmar's Zuarasici.

In Slavic languages, the suffix "-yc","-ič", "-wicz", "-vič" added to a personal name creates a patronym, meaning a "son", or more generally "offspring" or "descendant" of the person bearing the name, therefore Svarožič, or Swarożyc is "a son", "grandson" or other offspring of Svarog (with "g" replaced with "ż", or "ž", according to Slavic grammar rules).

== Political center and Slavic revolts ==
According to Helmold of Bosau, the Slavic revolt of 983 was started after a meeting at the civitas Rethre.

Likewise the successful beginning of the Obotrite revolt of 1066 was, according to Adam of Bremen celebrated in "Rethra" by the ritual decapitation of captured bishop Johann of Mecklenburg and the sacrifice of his head, stuck on a lance, to Riedegost. The last historical record of "Rheda" is an entry in the Annals of Augsburg for the year 1068, describing its capture by bishop Burchard and the abduction of its sacred horse.

It is assumed that Radgosc was destroyed either in this or one of the following campaigns; probably it was destroyed and rebuilt several times since Ebo's Vita Ottonis episcopi Bambergensis (III, 5) mentions the destruction of "the Lutician civitas and temple" by king Lothair of Supplinburg in 1126/27, without specifying its name.
