= Linde (Tollense) =

River in Mecklenburg-Vorpommern, Germany

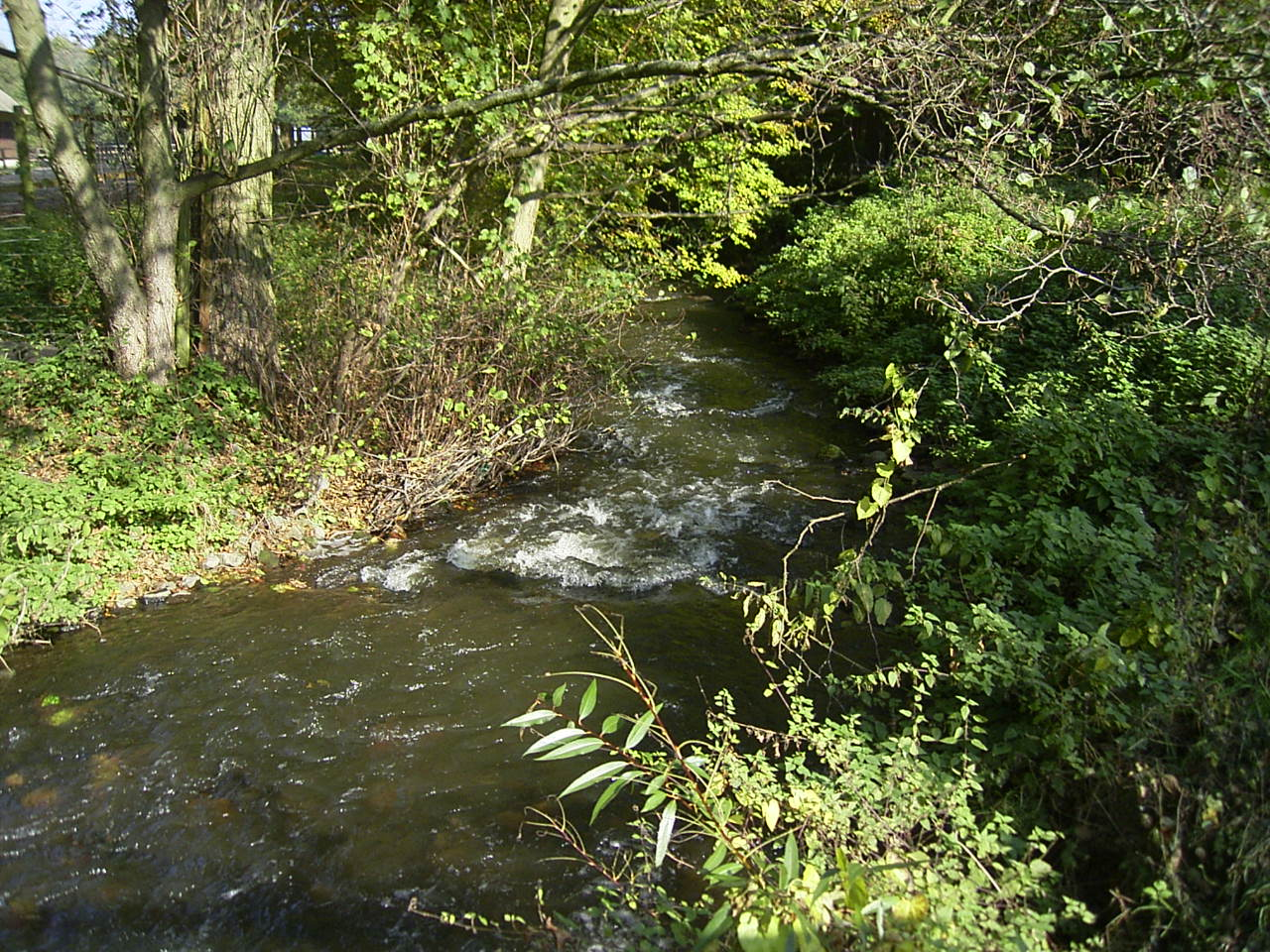

Location
- Country: Germany
- State: Mecklenburg-Vorpommern
- Municipality: Helpt and Petersdorf (both Woldegk), Lindetal

Physical characteristics
- Source
  - location: North side of Helpter Berg
  - coordinates: ♁53° 29′ 33″ N, 13° 36′ 27″ E
  - elevation: 130 m above sea level
- Mouth
  - location: In the Tollense in Neubrandenburg
  - coordinates: 53°33′23″N 13°15′09″E
  - elevation: 14.6 m
- Discharge
  - location: Burg Stargard–Papiermühlenweg gauge

Basin features
- Progression: Tollense→ Peene→ Baltic Sea
- River system: Peene
- Cities: Neubrandenburg

The Linde (German pronunciation: [ˈlɪndə]), known in ancient times as the Starger, is a river in Germany. It is about 42 km (26 mi) long, and a right tributary of the Tollense river. There is a considerable difference in altitude of over 117 meters between the source and the mouth.

== River course ==
The Linde originates in the municipal area of the town of Woldegk, on the north side of the Helpter Berg, a kilometer south-southeast of the village of Helpt from the confluence of a small pond and a stream from the forest.

From Helpt, the Linde flows westwards as a still small and partially piped body of water. At Pasenow it flows through the Great Lake and then the Small Lake. At Petersdorf, it falls below 80 m above sea level and from here on it is continuously visible above ground. In Lindetal its incised erosion valley begins, which reaches its greatest depth between Stargard Castle and Neubrandenburg.

In Neubrandenburg, the Linde forms the outer moat of the medieval defences just behind the Swan Pond, between the Stargard Gate and the Treptow Gate. South of Rostocker Strasse it flows into the Oberbach, the right arm of the Tollense river. The Gätenbach, a canal south of Neubrandenburg's city centre, carries the majority of the Linde water into the Tollensesee at a flow rate of 0.55 m^{3}/s (19 cu ft/s), from which it then flows into the Tollense river, although probably for the most part through its left arm, the Ölmühlenbach.

== History ==
In historical times, the Linde powered many important watermills, filled parts of Neubrandenburg's medieval moat system, and flooded the broken areas in the south and west of the city in times of war.

In earlier times, the Werbender Mühlenbach was also considered a tributary of the Linde. Today, however, it is considered to be part of the Nonnenbach. Its bifurcation near Blankensee is already shown in the Schmettauschen maps of the 18th century, with emphasis on the branch to the Wanzkaer See, whose outflow is the Nonnenbach.

== See also ==
- List of rivers of Mecklenburg-Vorpommern
