= Hammerstein (surname) =

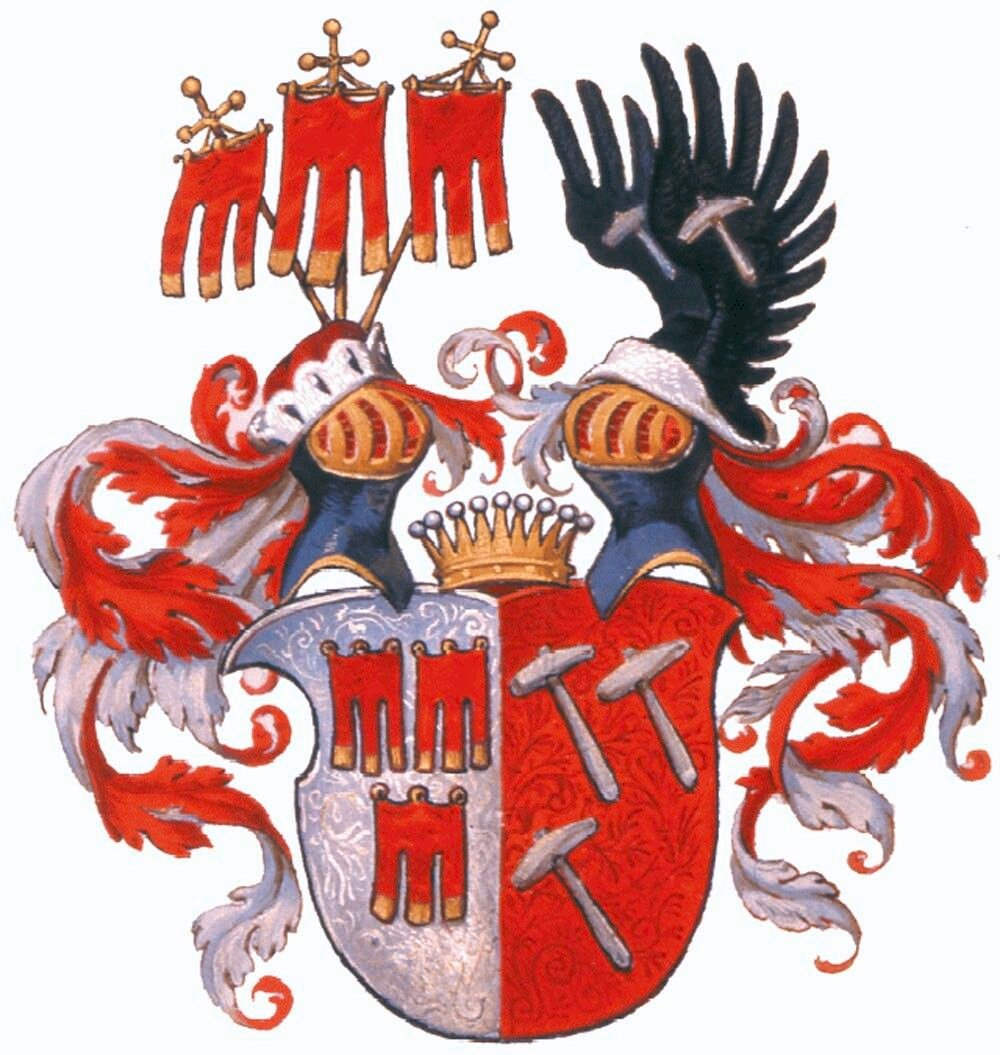
Coat of arms of Barons von Hammerstein

Hammerstein is the name of an ancient German noble family originated from Burg Hammerstein in Rhineland-Palatinate. Members of the family held the title of Baron. Three lines of the family existed: Hammerstein-Equord, Hammerstein-Gesmold and Hammerstein-Loxten. Hammerstein is also a German surname.

== Notable members ==
- Arthur Hammerstein (1872–1955), American opera producer
- Carl-Detlev Freiherr von Hammerstein (born 1938), German farmer and politician (CDU)
- David Hammerstein Mintz (born 1955), Spanish politician
- Dorothy Hammerstein (1899–1987), Australian-American interior designer and decorator
- Elaine Hammerstein (1897–1948), American actress
- Ernst von Hammerstein-Loxten (1827–1914), German lawyer and politician
- Hans von Hammerstein-Loxten (1843–1905), German civil servant and politician
- James Hammerstein (1931–1999), American theatre director and producer
- Jane-Howard Hammerstein (1934–2022), American screenwriter
- Marie Luise von Hammerstein (1908–1999), German lawyer
- Mike Hammerstein (born 1963), American football player
- Notker Hammerstein (1930–2024), German historian
- Oscar Hammerstein I (1847–1919), German-American theatre impresario
- Oscar Hammerstein II (1895–1960), American songwriter and musical director
- Oscar Hammerstein (lawyer) (born 1954), Dutch lawyer
- Reinhold Hammerstein (1915–2010), German musicologist
- Stella Hammerstein (1882–1975), American actress
- Wilhelm Joachim von Hammerstein (1838–1904), German politician
- Willie Hammerstein (1875–1914), American theatre manager

== See also ==
- Kurt von Hammerstein-Equord (1878–1943), German general
