= Nonnenbach (Tollense) =

River in Germany

Nonne
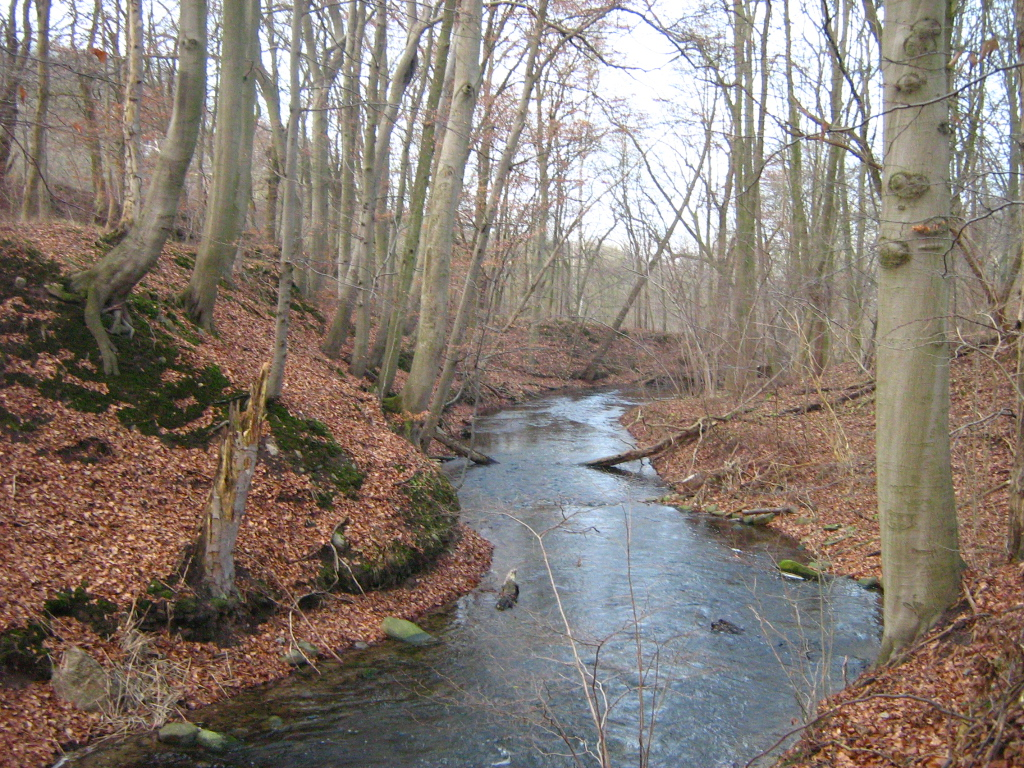

Location
- Country: Germany
- States: Mecklenburg-Vorpommern

Physical characteristics
- Mouth
  - location: Tollensesee
  - coordinates: 53.4708°N 13.1756°E

Basin features
- Progression: Tollense→ Peene→ Baltic Sea

The Nonnenbach is a small river of Mecklenburg-Vorpommern, Germany. It flows through the Wanzkaer See and it discharges into the Tollensesee, which is passed by the Tollense, near Groß Nemerow. It is fed by multiple small tributaries including the Upstream of the Wanzkaer See, the Nonnnebach traditionally is called Werbender Mühlenbachor Werbender Mühlbach.

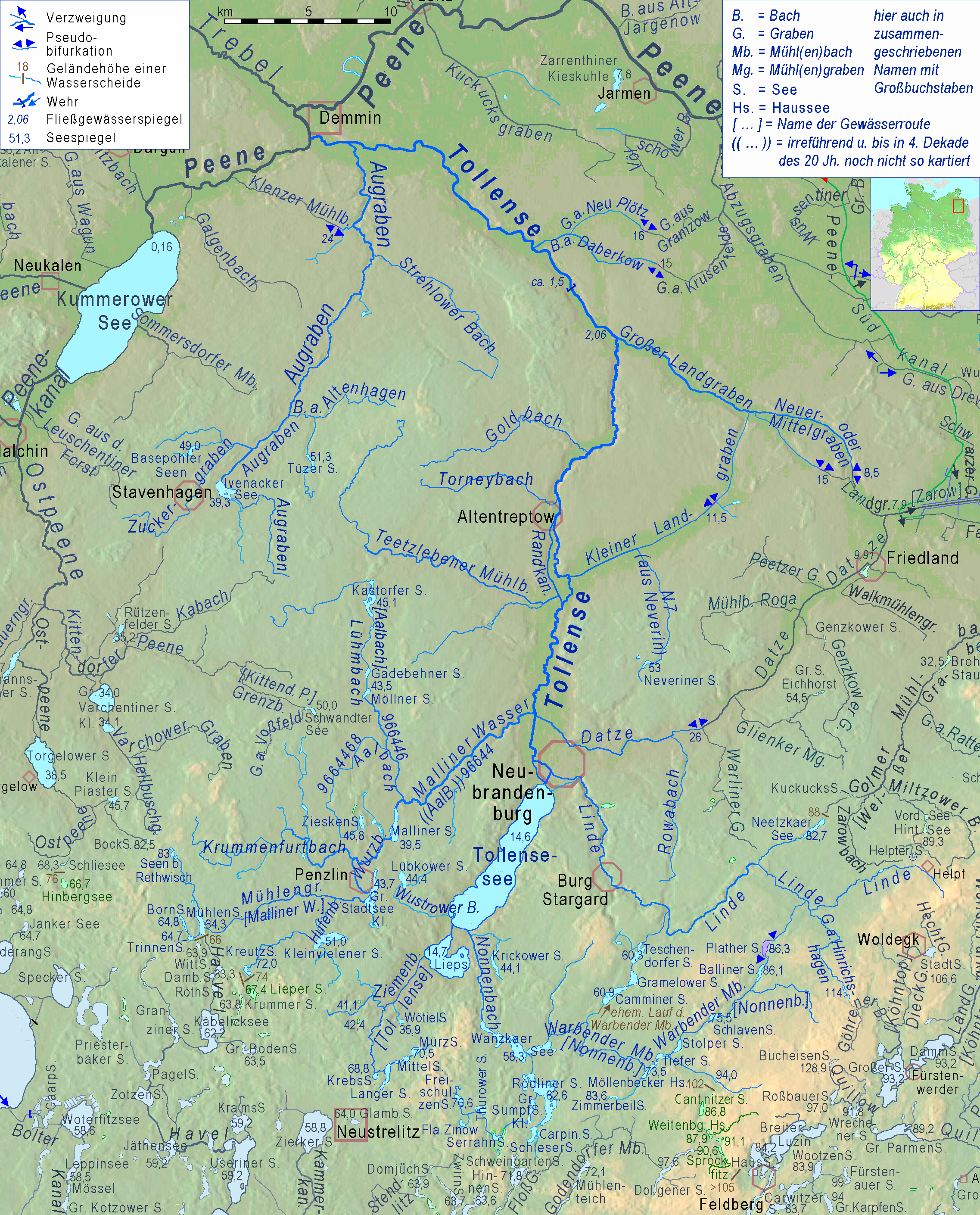
Nonnenbach, comprising Werbender Mühlenbach, in the basin of Tollense river

== See also ==
- List of rivers of Mecklenburg-Vorpommern
