= Fischerinsel (Tollensesee) =

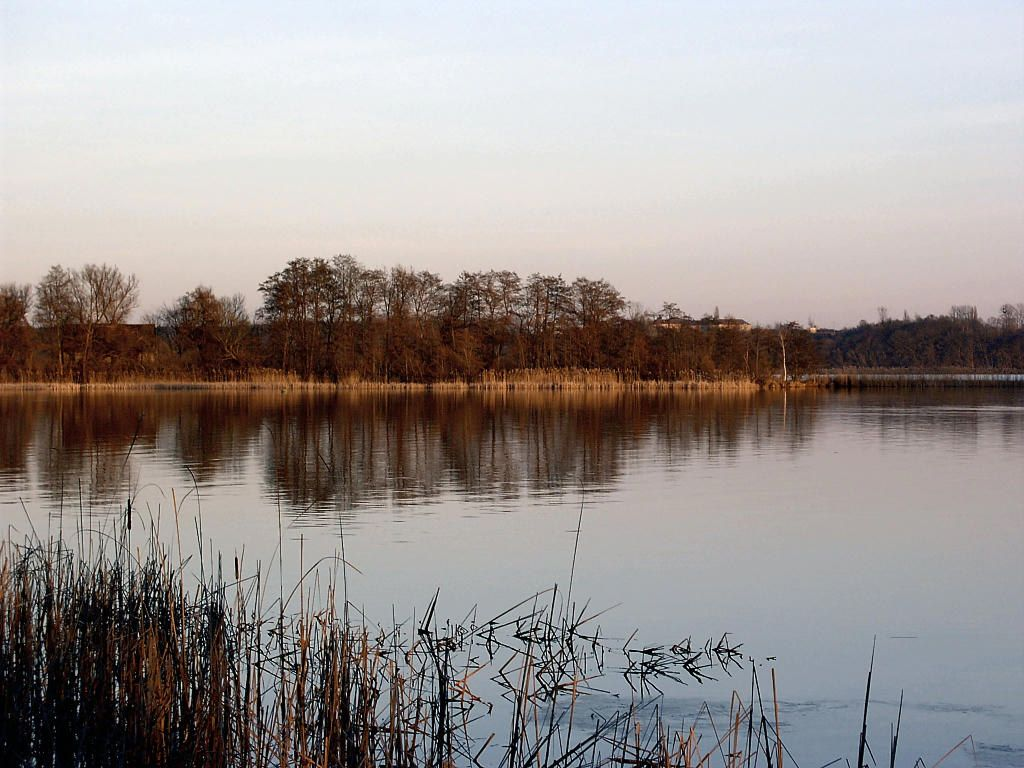
- South part of the island.

- Location within Germany Location within Mecklenburg-Vorpommern

Geography
- Location: Tollensesee
- Coordinates: 53°28′44″N 13°09′52″E

Administration
- Germany

Fischerinsel (Fisher Island) is a lake island in Germany, in the state of Mecklenburg-Vorpommern, in the district of Mecklenburgische Seenplatte, near Neubrandenburg. It is located in the southern part of Lake Tollensesee, in front of the city of Penzlin.

It is a 150-meter-long and 40-meter-wide island, which is today covered with trees. In the middle of the island, at its eastern end, stands a ruined fishing hut from 1729, which was still used in the 1970s. Fishermen who stayed on the Tollensesee lakes and nearby Lieps spent the night there.

== Archeology ==
For a long time research was carried out on the island, because it was believed that it was the legendary center of the cult of Slavic tribe Veleti – Rethra. In 1969, during archaeological excavations carried out under the direction of the German archaeologist Adolf Hollnagel, two cult figures of oak wood were discovered in the layer dated to the 11th-12th century. The first, 1.78 meter high, shows two male busts with large eyes, noses and mustaches in headgear (helmets?) placed on a column. The second figure, measuring 1.57 meter, shows a female figure with clearly marked breasts. According to the researchers, this finding can confirm the existence of the cult of twin deities in the Slavic mythology (see Lel and Polel).

There were also many remains of wood from a castle (castrum Wustrow), also mentioned in a document, which existed until the 13th century. A bridge discovered in 1886 when a canal was built led from the mainland near Wustrow to the island. During subsequent excavations, valuable finds were made, such as keys, knives, axes, spear points, temple rings, silver coins and others. It is believed that the island was fortified settlement. In 1977, another German archaeologist Hartmut Boeck discovered a 40m × 14m rectangular place in the northeastern part of the island, which was growing more and more every year. However, he came to the conclusion that there had to be a building here once. Earlier drilling in the same place, which was carried out by Gustav Oesten in 1905, proved that there were pieces of charcoal and ceramic shells in this place. A building or castle once located in the northeastern part of the island indicates a settlement of Slavic worship.

It is believed that Fischerinsel is the most likely place of the Rethra.

== Gallery ==
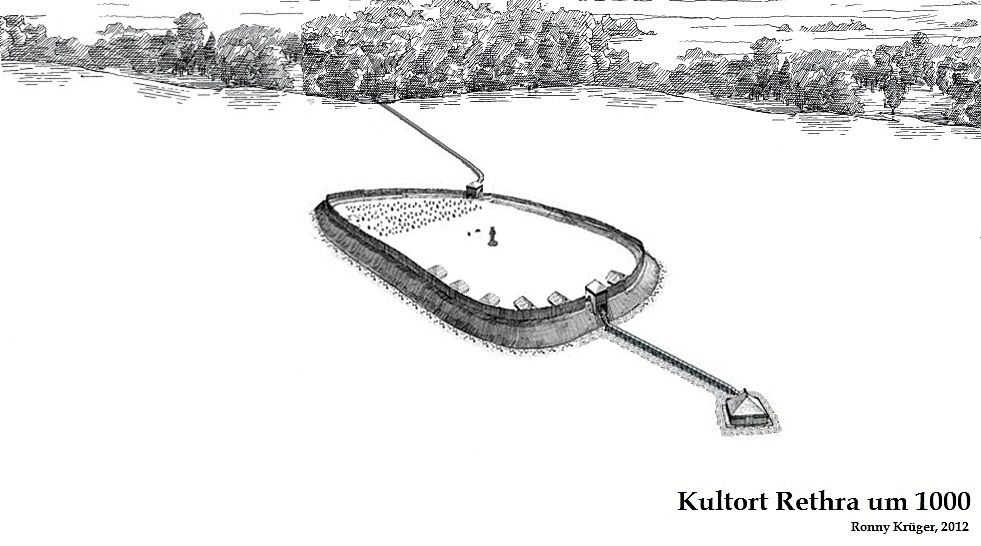
Reconstruction of the fort on the island.

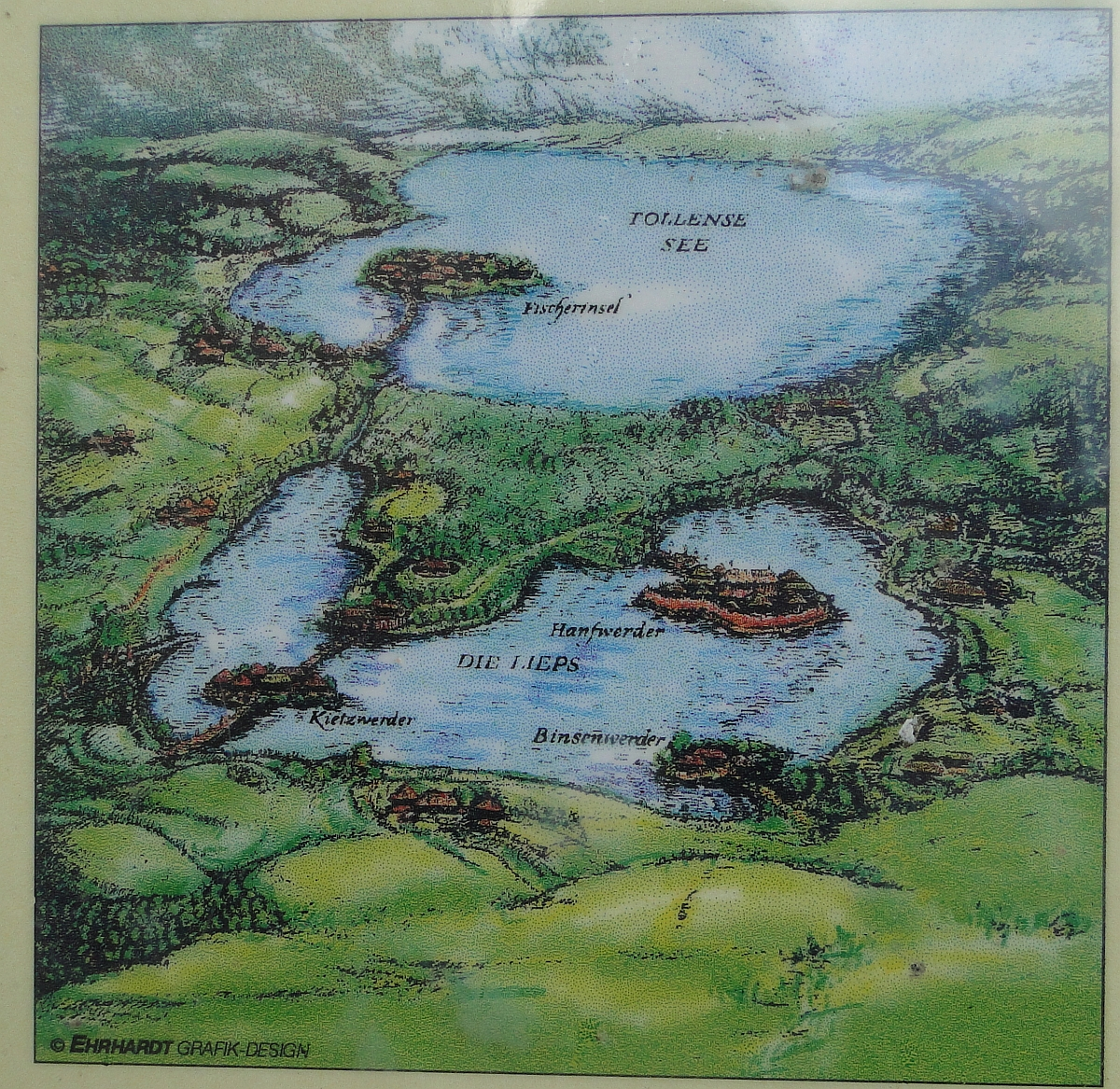
Map of Rethra as a detail on the information board.

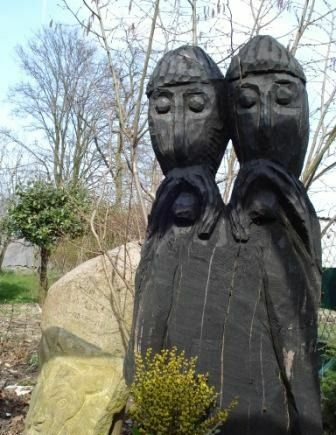
Copy of idols found on the island.

== Bibliography ==
- Brückner, Ludwig (1889). Rethra lag auf der Fischerinsel in der Tollense (in German). Vol. 54. pp. 153–167.
- Boeck, Hartmut (2002). Wo lag Rethra? Forscher mit und ohne Spaten auf der Suche nach einer versunkenen Stadt (in German). Neubrandenburg: Historisches Bezirksmuseum. ISBN 3-930164-69-8.
- Schmidt, Volker (1984). "Lieps. Eine slawische Siedlungskammer am Südende des Tollensesees". Beiträge zur Ur- und Frühgeschichte Mecklenburg-Vorpommerns (in German). Berlin: Deutscher Verlag der Wissenschaften. ISSN 0138-4279.
- Wetzel, Dietmar (2013). RIEDEGOST Das Geheimnis der verlassenen Burg (in German). ISBN 9783933274830.
