= 1764 Woldegk tornado =

Exceptionally strong tornado

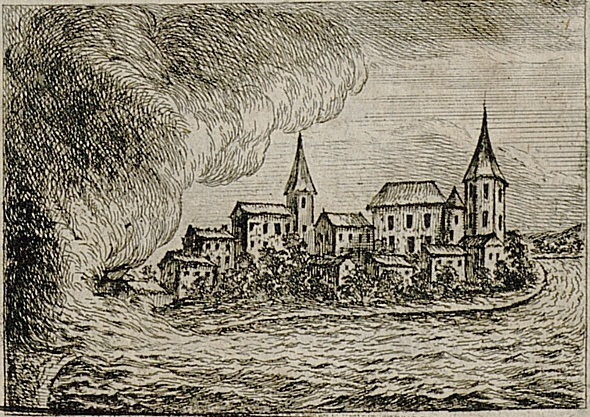
- A copper engraving by Gottlob Burchard Genzmer showing the tornado

Meteorological history
- Date: 29 June 1764
- Duration: 1 hour

IF5 tornado
- on the International Fujita scale

T11 tornado
- on the TORRO scale
- Highest winds: >480 km/h (300 mph) (Note: The Fujita scale begins the F5 rating at 261 mph (420 km/h), but, since the tornado was rated T11 on the TORRO scale, the wind speeds must be at least 480 km/h (300 mph).)
- Largest hail: 15 cm (6 in)

Overall effects
- Fatalities: 1
- Injuries: 3
- Areas affected: around Woldegk, Duchy of Mecklenburg-Strelitz, Holy Roman Empire (now Germany)

On June 29, 1764, an extremely violent IF5 tornado struck the town of Woldegk, Holy Roman Empire (modern day Germany.) The tornado received the unique T11 rating on the TORRO scale along with an F5 rating on the Fujita scale and had winds estimated to be at least 480 kilometres per hour (300 mph). The tornado traveled 30 kilometres (19 mi) and reached a maximum width of 900 metres (980 yd). The F5 rating was later updated to IF5 rating on the International Fujita scale

Most of the information known about this tornado came from a detailed 77-paragraph study by German scientist Gottlob Burchard Genzmer, which was published one year after the tornado occurred. The tornado completely destroyed several structures, and several tree branches were reportedly thrown into the atmosphere. Many areas were covered with up to 2 centimetres (0.8 in) of ice. The storm which produced the tornado was dry, with almost no rain reported. Large hail, reportedly reaching 15 centimetres (6 in) in diameter covered the ground. The hail caused significant crop and property damage, killed dozens of animals, and injured multiple people in a large stretch around the tornado and to the northwest of the tornado's path.

== Tornado summary ==
The tornado touched down at F2 intensity about 1.5 kilometres (0.9 mi) southwest of Feldberg and began uprooting oak and beech trees. It escalated into F2–F3 intensity, throwing two children, who survived, into a lake. Around this time, several geese were "smashed" by hail, and the tornado grew to a width of about 100 metres (110 yd). Continuing northeast, the tornado crossed a lake and was spotted by a person, who described it as a "wedge tornado". The witness said the lake's water rose and then retreated around the time of the tornado. After crossing the lake, the tornado blew the roof and walls off a home. This is where the only fatality from the tornado occurred.

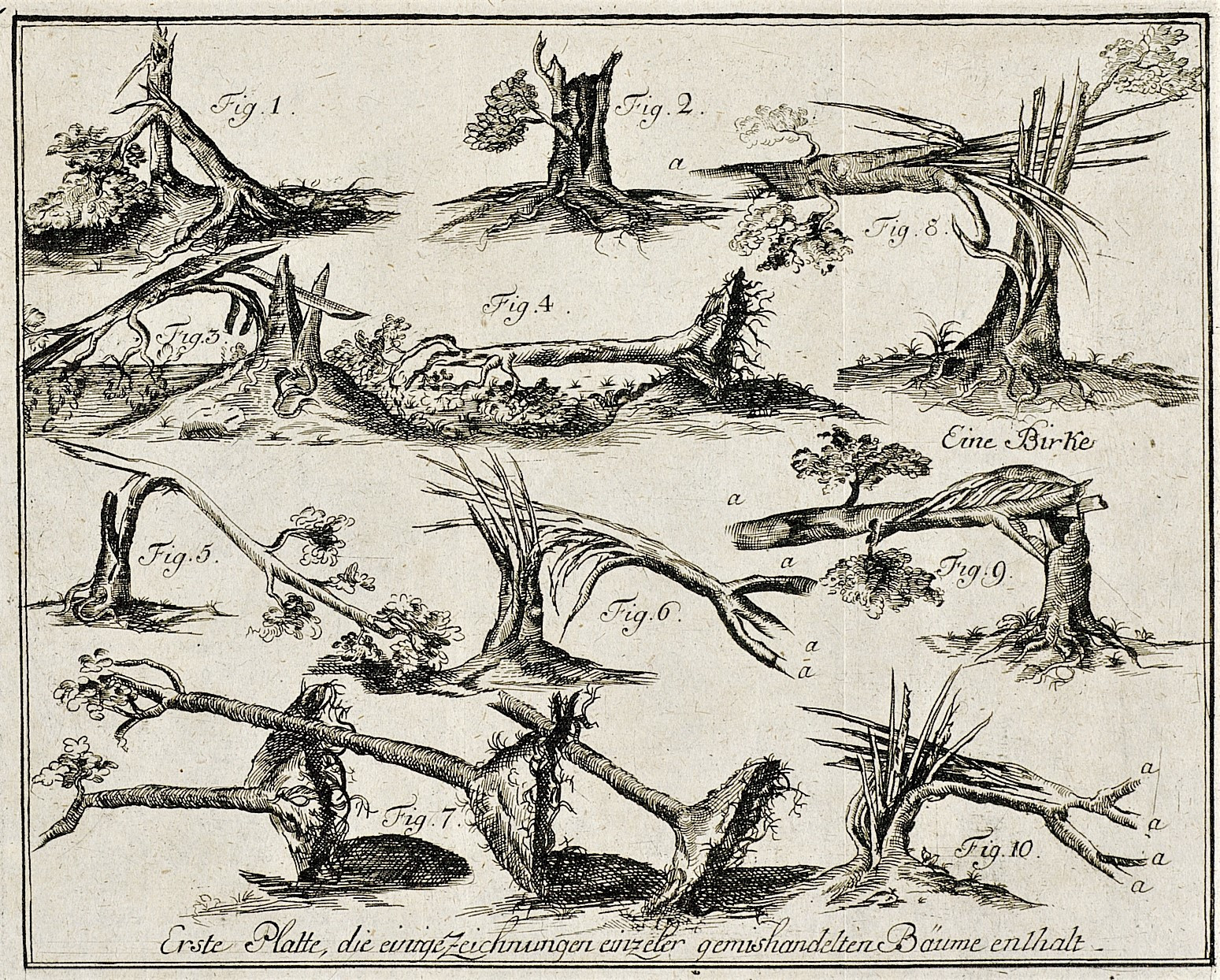
A copper plate by Genzmer showing various types of forestry damage caused by the tornado

The tornado shifted east-northeast and narrowed to a width of 45 metres (49 yd). As it reached its smallest width, still maintaining F3 intensity, a possible twin or satellite waterspout merged with it along the shore of Lake Luzin. Immediately after, the tornado changed direction to almost due north and intensified to F3–F4 intensity as it destroyed a beech timber forest. It then widened to 225 metres (246 yd), snapping and uprooting several solitary oak trees, throwing them 35 metres (38 yd) into the air. Soil drifting, known today as ground scouring, occurred at this time. Crops, grass and 10 centimetres (4 in) of topsoil were removed. The tornado then turned northeast, where it destroyed Lichtenberg Forest.

The tornado intensified, tearing the bark from an oak tree at F4 intensity and soon after reached its peak intensity. A mansion with an adjacent dairy farm was destroyed except for the ground floor. Oak tree stubs were ripped out of the ground, and cobblestones weighing 75 kilograms (165 lb) were thrown. The European Severe Storms Laboratory said damage at the mansion warranted a rating of F5/T11 with estimated windspeeds of at least 480 km/h (300 mph). A witness described the experience as being "surrounded by birds trapped in the vortex". After destroying the mansion, the tornado quickly weakened to F1 and left a 500-metre (550 yd) wide path of light damage in a forest.

The tornado soon intensified again as it struck Rothe Kirche and uprooted an old oak tree, which lifted a skeleton out of a grave at F3 intensity. Around this time, the tornado reached its maximum width of 900 metres (980 yd) and caused severe damage to an oak and beech forest. The tornado then continued northeast, passing just west of Woldegk, near the settlement of Canzow, where it damaged a mansion, tore apart two barns, and overturned seven dung carts at F2–F3 intensity. Further to the northeast, the tornado caught a flock of geese in flight, killing some and injuring between 60 and 100 geese. Isolated tree damage was seen around this time as well. The tornado then struck Helpt at F2 intensity, where a mansion and another structure sustained roof damage, as well as the upper floor being removed from a gatehouse. After striking Helpt, the tornado dissipated.

== See also ==
- List of F5 and EF5 tornadoes
- List of European tornadoes and tornado outbreaks
