= Oscar Hammerstein =

Oscar Hammerstein may refer to:

- Oscar Hammerstein I (1846–1919), cigar manufacturer, opera impresario and theatre builder
- Oscar Hammerstein II (1895–1960), Broadway lyricist, songwriting partner of Jerome Kern and Richard Rodgers
- Oscar Hammerstein (lawyer) (born 1954), Dutch lawyer
