= Helpt Hills =

Hill range in Germany

Helpter Berge
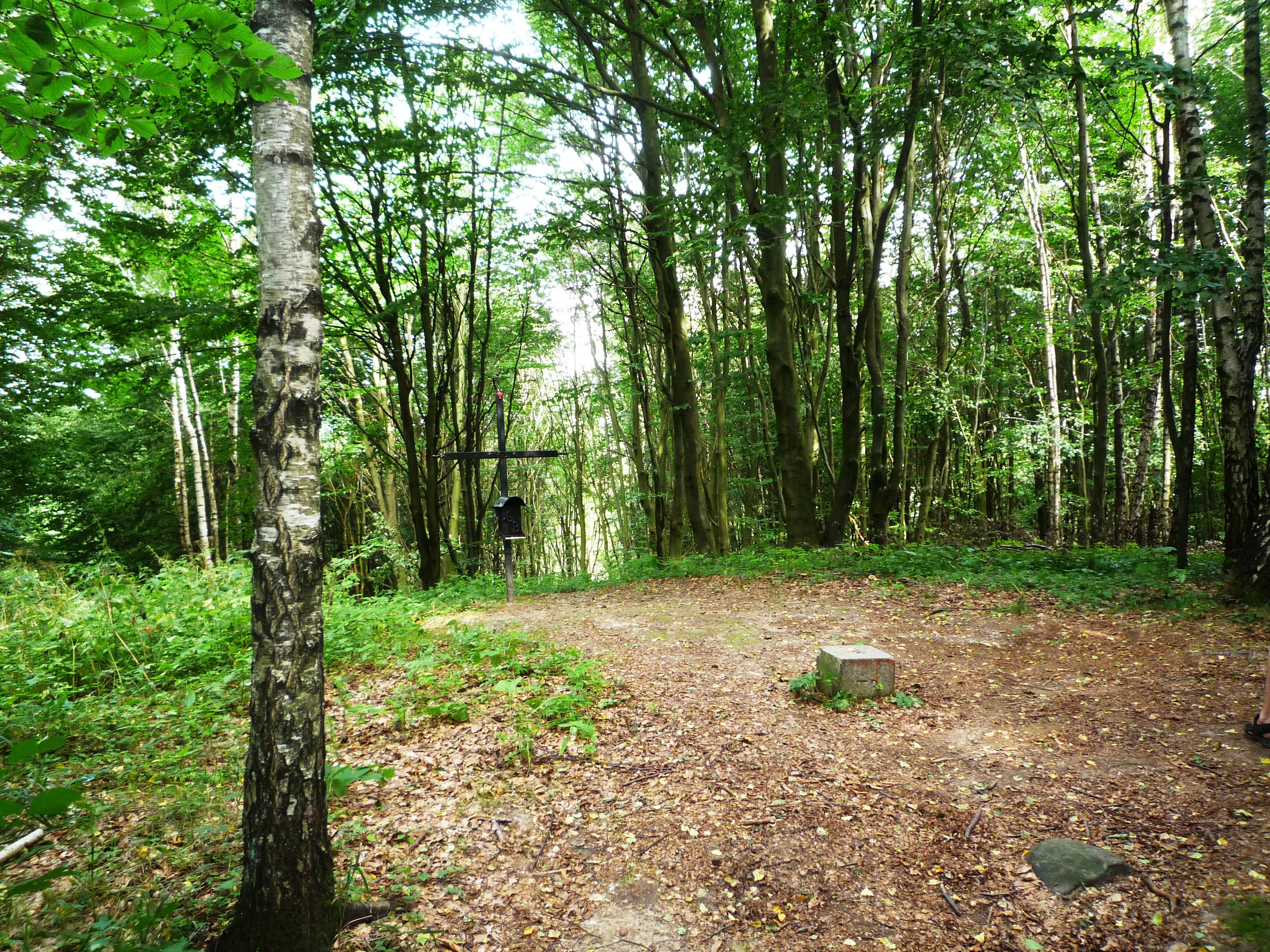
- Summit Helpter Berg: highest point of the Helpt Hills with trig point and hill cross

Highest point
- Peak: Helpter Berg
- Elevation: 179.2 m above NHN

Geography
- Location within Mecklenburg-Vorpommern
- State(s): Mecklenburgische Seenplatte, Mecklenburg-Vorpommern Germany
- Range coordinates: 53°29′11″N 13°36′31″E
- Parent range: Mecklenburg-Brandenburg Lake District

Geology
- Rock type: terminal moraine of the Weichselian glaciation

The Helpt Hills (German: Helpter Berge) are the highest natural elevation in the northeast German state of Mecklenburg-Vorpommern reaching a maximum height of 179.2 metres (588 ft) above sea level (NHN). The hills are a terminal moraine formed during the Pomeranian stadium of the Weichselian glaciation and were named after the village of Helpt on their northern slopes.

The ridge, which is part of a relatively short hill chain running from southwest to northeast, is located in the east of the aforementioned German state in the district of Mecklenburgische Seenplatte about 24 kilometres (15 mi) (south)-east of Neubrandenburg, 3 kilometres (1.9 mi) north of Woldegk and 25 kilometres (16 mi) west of Strasburg.

About 580 metres (630 yd) southwest of the highest point of the Helpt Hills is the Helpterberg Television Tower which is about 155 metres (509 ft) high and not accessible to the public. Other transmission installations have been built not far to the north-northeast of the tower.

== See also ==
- List of mountain and hill ranges in Germany
