= Carl-Detlev Freiherr von Hammerstein =

German politician

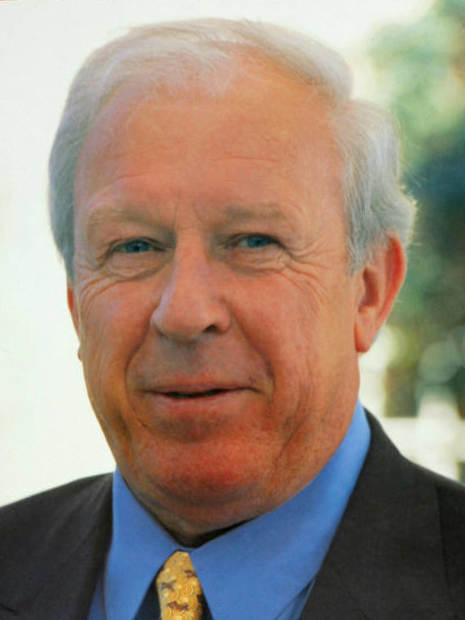
Carl-Detlev Freiherr von Hammerstein

Carl-Detlev Freiherr von Hammerstein (born 26 January 1938 in Bockel) is a German politician and farmer.

== Biography ==
He was a member of an old Hammerstein family, which, prior to 1919, belonged to German nobility. He has been a member of the Christian Democratic Union of Germany (CDU) in Rotenburg, Germany since 1975, and a member of the German federal parliament representing the CDU from 1983 to 1987. He served in parliament again from 1990 to 2002, representing the Verden-Osterholz constituency. Aside from his political career, Hammerstein has been a farmer and forester in Gyhum-Bockel since 1961. He was married to Lily Gräfin von der Schulenburg (1937–2015), and has three children.
