= Maria Paasche =

German rebel

Maria von Hammerstein in 1933

Maria Therese von Hammerstein Paasche (1909 – 21 January 2000) was a German anti-Nazi activist and literary researcher. She transported Jews out of Germany in the early years of the Nazi regime and later emigrated from Nazi Germany to Japan, where she lived for several years before settling in the United States.

== Life in Germany ==
Hammerstein was born in 1909 in Magdeburg, one of seven children born to Maria von Lüttwitz (daughter of Walther von Lüttwitz) and Kurt von Hammerstein-Equord, a general who would later serve as commander-in-chief of the Reichswehr in the 1930s. She and her siblings were encouraged to explore intellectual and political ideas; she had many Jewish friends and planned to move to Palestine with some of them. She enrolled at a public school where she could study agriculture, and went on to attend the University of Berlin.

Following Adolf Hitler's ascension to power in 1933, she helped Jews and intellectuals escape Germany by taking them to Prague on her motorcycle. She also provided the Jewish and anti-Nazi community in Prague with newspapers and warned them about Nazi plans that she learned from her father. In 1935, she married John H. Paasche, a man of Jewish ancestry whose father, Hans Paasche, was a known pacifist. Maria and John briefly moved to Palestine before returning to Germany due to a typhoid outbreak. They emigrated to Japan after several interrogations by the Gestapo. Maria's father plotted unsuccessfully to kill Hitler in 1939, and two of her brothers took part in another conspiracy to kill Hitler in 1944; her mother and two siblings were imprisoned in concentration camps until the end of World War II.

== Life in the United States ==
Maria and John Paasche lived for several years in Japan, where all four of their children were born, but migrated to San Francisco in 1948 due to fears of the German exile community and being monitored by the Japanese police. In San Francisco, Maria initially cleaned houses while John worked in a tomato canning factory. She went on to become a literary researcher, and was fluent in German, French, Russian and English. In later life, she lived in San Francisco's Jewish Home for the Aged; she was the facility's second-ever non-Jewish resident. She died in San Francisco on 21 January 2000 from heart failure.

Paasche was the subject of a 1999 documentary film, Silent Courage: Maria Therese von Hammerstein and Her Battle Against Nazism, which was funded by B'nai B'rith and the German government.

== See also ==
- Marie Luise von Hammerstein
