= Genzmer =

Genzmer is a surname. Notable people with the surname include:

- Elmer L. Genzmer (1903–1977), American politician
- Gottlob Burchard Genzmer (1716–1771), German Lutheran theologian, tutor, and naturalist
- Harald Genzmer (1909–2007), German composer and academic
