= Tollense =

River in Germany

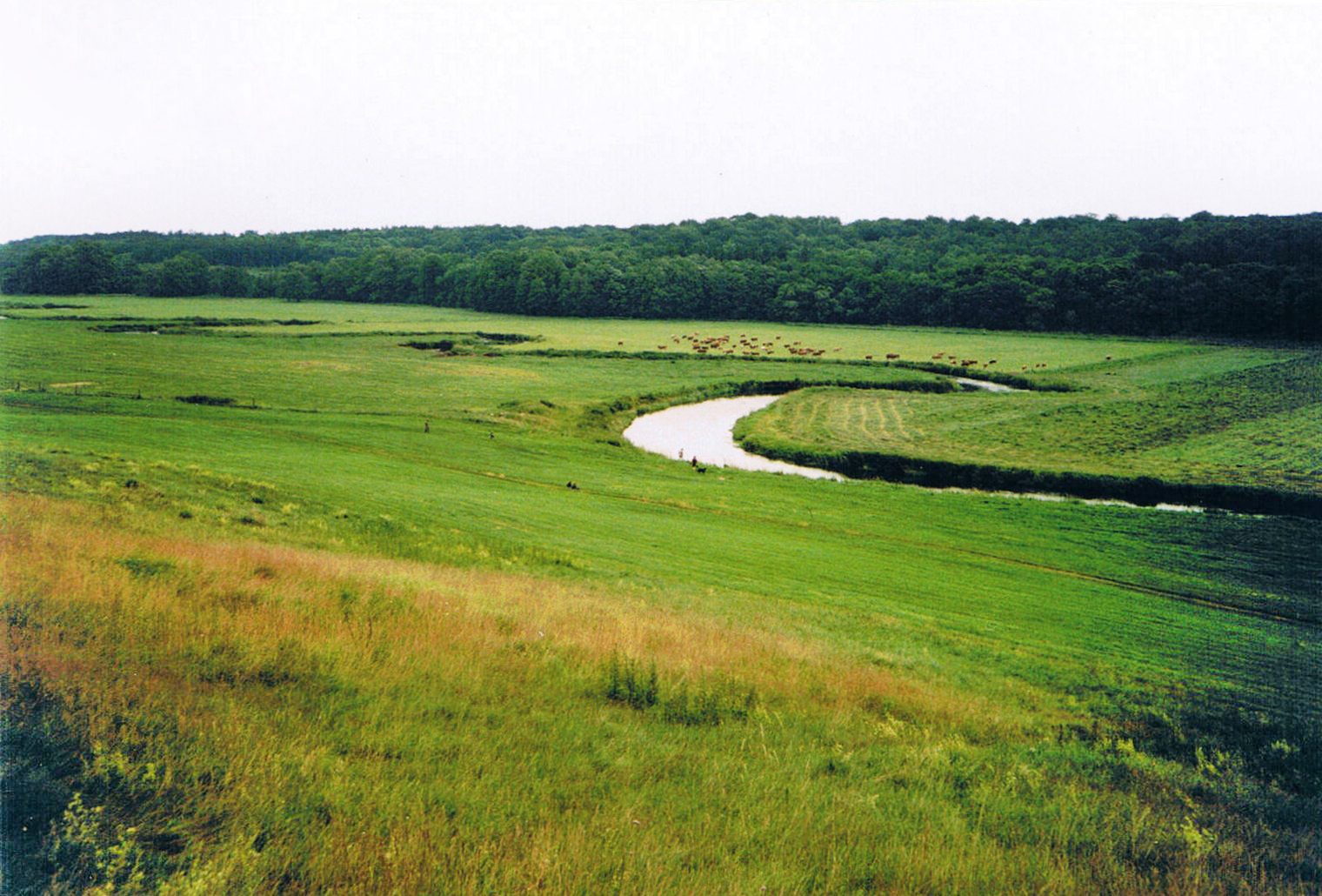

Location
- Country: Germany
- State: Mecklenburg-Vorpommern

Physical characteristics
- Source
  - location: Mecklenburg-Vorpommern
- Mouth
  - location: Demmin
  - coordinates: 53°53′57″N 13°1′57″E
- Length: 95.81 km (59.53 mi)
- Basin size: 1,799 km (1,118 mi)

Basin features
- Progression: Peene→ Baltic Sea

The Tollense (German pronunciation: [tɔˈlɛnzə], from Slavic dolenica "lowland, (flat) valley") is a river in Mecklenburg-Vorpommern in northeastern Germany, right tributary of the Peene. It has a total length of 95.8 km.

The upper course begins near a small lake named Mürzsee, near the village of Blumenholz. A part of it is traditionally called Ziemenbach, flowing to lake Lieps. From this lake to Lake Tollense (Tollensesee) it is nowadays called Liepskanal. The section from Lake Tollense to the junction with the Peene river near Demmin has a length of 68 km. At this junction, the discharge and basin of Tollense is larger than the discharge and upstream basin of Peene river.

The first kilometer of the outflow in Neubrandenburg is called Oberbach. Afterwards, it is reached by two major tributaries, Linde river from the east and Malliner Wasser from the west. The middling section of Tollense river is joined to Zarow river by three different Pseudo-bifurcations.

== Tollense battle site ==
Human remains from the Bronze Age have been found in the Tollense valley (Tollensetal) since 1997 AD and excavated since 2007. Thousands of bone fragments belonging to a very large number of persons have since been discovered along with further corroborating evidence of battle; current estimates indicate that perhaps 4,000 warriors took part in a battle on the site circa 1250 BC. These findings were possible due to the preservation of the former fen ground and the fact that the Tollense has never really changed its course. Since the population density then was about 5 people per square kilometer, this would have been the most significant battle in Bronze Age period Germany yet to be discovered. Moreover, the Tollense valley is so far the largest excavated battle site of this age anywhere in the world. Further investigation of the site took place between 2010 and 2015. The vast scale of the battle indicates there were organized battles occurring in Bronze Age northern Europe with trained warriors and workers providing food to the warriors, which allowed the warriors to train full-time. Since writing would not reach Northern Europe for another millennia and a half, there are no records of the battle.
