= Marie Luise von Hammerstein =

German lawyer and activist

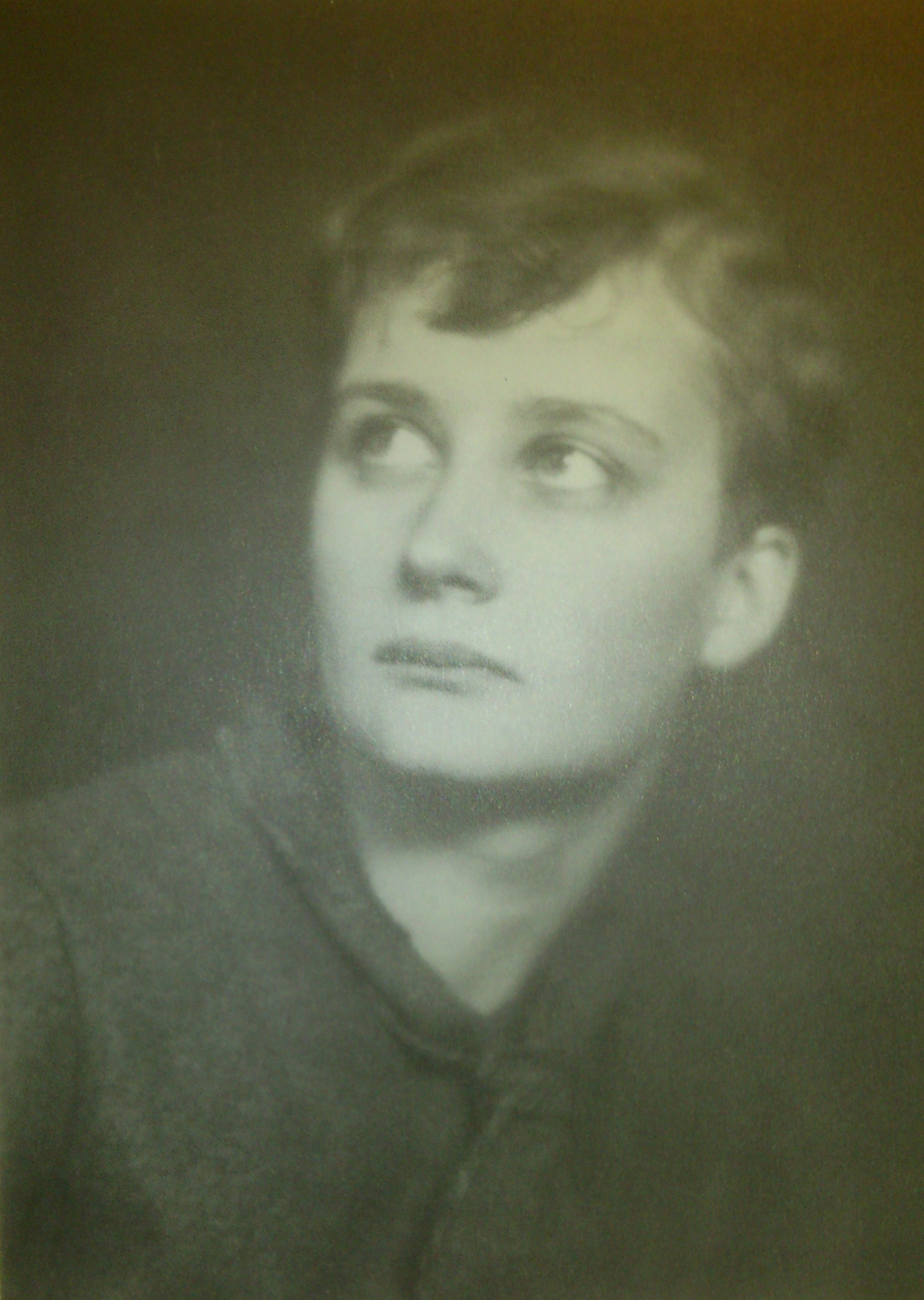
1928

Marie Luise Baroness of Münchhausen (27 September 1908 – 6 November 1999), born Baroness of Hammerstein-Equord, was a German lawyer. Despite being born into an aristocratic army family she became an activist member of the Communist Party. She worked for the party's intelligence service during the 1930s. She was treated with on-going suspicion and subjected to a number of interrogations by the security services between 1933 and 1945, although her party intelligence involvement is confirmed only in a document dated 1973.

== Life ==
=== Provenance and early years ===
Marie-Luise Cäcilie "Butzi" von Hammerstein-Equord was born in Berlin, the eldest child of Kurt von Hammerstein-Equord by his marriage to Baroness Maria von Lüttwitz. The Hammerstein family was a well connected German noble family. The father of Marie Luise served as head of the German army between 1930 and 1933. He was deeply opposed to the National Socialists but nevertheless, when he died in 1943, it was from illness. Other family members ended the war years in hiding, or, like Franz, the youngest brother of Marie Luise, as concentration camp inmates.

=== Student years ===
She studied Jurisprudence at the Frederick-William University (as it was then known) of Berlin. She was, by this time, already politically engaged. To her mother's horror, she "quit the church" when she was 16. In 1923 she joined the Wandervogel movement. The Wandervogels were a nationwide youth network that combined hiking and other outdoor activities with a romanticist rejection of industrialisation and modernism in favour of old Teutonic values which on occasion overlapped with less palatable forms of German nationalism. Through the Wandervogels she met up with Nathan Steinberger and Gertrud Classen. Through Steinberger and Classen she came into contact with the Communist Party, becoming a member during the first part of 1928, though still aged only 19. Over the next few years she and her younger sister Helga passed on secret information about their father's work to the "AM-Apparat" (literally "Anti-Military Apparatus"), which was the intentionally misleading name of the party's extensive intelligence organisation in Germany. Given Leo Roth's personal involvement with her sister Helga, it is unsurprising that Marie Luise was also in contact with Roth during the middle 1930s, but the earliest confirmation that she worked for "Soviet intelligence", and that her handler was Leo Roth, comes in the form of a curriculum vitae which she herself composed for "internal use" as recently as 1973. Plans for a war of aggression against the Soviet Union existed in Berlin and were known about in Moscow in 1933, though Stalin chose to ignore them. Since Kurt von Hammerstein-Equord was still head of the army through most of 1933, it is reasonable to infer that Moscow's awareness of these plans resulted wholly or in part from information gathered from his papers by his daughters Marie Luise and Helga. According to one source it was for this reason that many years later the government of East Germany awarded Marie-Luise their Medal for Fighters Against Fascism.

There is persuasive speculation that as a Berlin law student von Hammerstein-Equord had a love affair with Werner Scholem, a member of the German Reichstag between 1924 and 1928, and a leading member of the Communist Party. Details of the romance may nevertheless have become embellished in the telling.

=== Change of direction ===
It may have been on account of her involvement with Werner Scholem that, starting in around 1930, she took language lessons in order to master Russian and, in parallel with her degree course, undertook a separate course to qualify as a "Referendarin", which would open the way for slower route, based on extensive "on-the job training" to a legal qualification. Having passed the necessary "Referendarin" exam she left university, apparently without completing her degree course, and took a job as a "Referendarin" (trainee lawyer), initially in Altlandsberg and later back in Berlin. In 1933 she married her employer, the lawyer Mogens von Harbou. He had recently become a member of the National Socialist Party (which had taken power at the start of that year). Although Marie von Hammerstein-Equord had, as far as anyone in the family and their social circle knew, abandoned her earlier political activism, she self-evidently remained out of sympathy with her husband's politics. She became pregnant almost immediately, but the marriage nevertheless lasted less than three years. Following the divorce, the couple's child was taken to live with his father's family. Meanwhile, until at least 1936, Marie-Luise was in touch with the party intelligence agent Leo Roth, directly and / or through her old friend from her Wandervogel days, Nathan Steinberger. (Note: Leo Roth (1911-1937) later became the lover and possibly also, briefly, the husband of Helga (1913-2005), the younger sister of Marie Luise von Hammerstein.)

=== Nazi era ===
During her brief marriage to Mogens von Harbou, she was under surveillance by the Gestapo and underwent numerous interrogations, some of which lasted for several days, as well as having her house searched. One, at least, of the reasons she found herself targeted was the (probably correct) beliefs on the part of the security services concerning the closeness of her earlier political and personal association with Werner Scholem (1895-1940).

There was no immediate reduction of the Gestapo surveillance after her divorce, but she was not held for detention periods of longer than few days. Soon afterwards, she moved to the countryside, relocating to Herrengroßstedt (Naumburg), in 1937 and in 1942 to Prien (Rosenheim). Baron Ernst-Friedemann von Münchhausen (1906–2002), whom von Hammerstein married c. 1937, had inherited a country estate on the outskirts of Herrengroßstedt. She had several children with von Münchhausen, but the marriage ended in 1951. The Herrengroßstedt estate was confiscated in the 1945 German land reforms. Von Münchhausen, who had been a reserve staff officer in the army supplies department during the Second World War, was one of a large number of aristocratic land owners who were interned as prisoners of war by the Soviet Union between 1945 and 1949.

=== Post-war years ===
After Germany was defeated in May 1945, von Hammerstein joined the Communist Party of Germany, which had been outlawed during Nazi rule. Rosenheim was in the American occupation zone after the war and she worked at the public employment office there until June 1947, when she moved to the western part of Berlin. She moved to Soviet-occupied eastern Berlin in September 1949, shortly before the German Democratic Republic (East Germany) was founded on 3 October. Von Hammerstein joined the Socialist Unity Party ("Sozialistische Einheitspartei Deutschlands" / SED) which had been founded in 1946. In the Soviet occupied zone the SED was the successor to the Communist Party of Germany, although the party continued to exist in West Germany until it was banned in 1956. The SED was the ruling party of East Germany for almost the whole of the country's existence.

She returned to the study of jurisprudence which she had broken off two decades earlier. She supported herself by working as a legal assistant. After qualifying, she worked as a lawyer in a co-operative legal practice in Berlin-Pankow and no longer engaged in political activism. However, at a National Front of the German Democratic Republic rally in July 1964 she caused controversy by commenting in public on her father's role as an opponent of Adolf Hitler.

According to Ministry for State Security (Stasi) files which became accessible to researchers after German reunification, Marie Luise von Hammerstein was "active [as an informant] for the Soviet security services between 1950 and 1960". (Note: "... inoffiziell für die sowjetischen Sicherheitsorgane tätig.") Her Stasi files included the comment that despite working for the Soviets she was "not without prejudices and a petty bourgeois mindset". (Note: " nicht frei von Vorurteilen und kleinbürgerlichen Denkweisen.") The Stasi were always on the look out for any contacts to known dissidents and any hint of people wanting to escape to the west. The Stasi file on von Hammerstein noted her connections with the social circles of the dissident academic Robert Havemann and the dissident singer-songwriter Wolf Biermann. One of her sons fled to the West. In terms of her professional and personal life, she tended to attract a large number of Jewish clients. She had for many years been estranged from her siblings "on political grounds".

Marie Louise von Münchhausen died in Berlin on 6 November 1999.

=== Popular culture ===
The fictional character "Marie-Luise Seegers", the communist daughter of Reichswehr Commander-in-Chief "Kurt Seegers" in the 2017 neo-noir series Babylon Berlin, is based on the biography of Marie Luise von Hammerstein.

== See also ==
- Maria Therese von Hammerstein Paasche
