= Petersdorf, Mecklenburg-Vorpommern =

Petersdorf
- Ortsteil of Woldegk
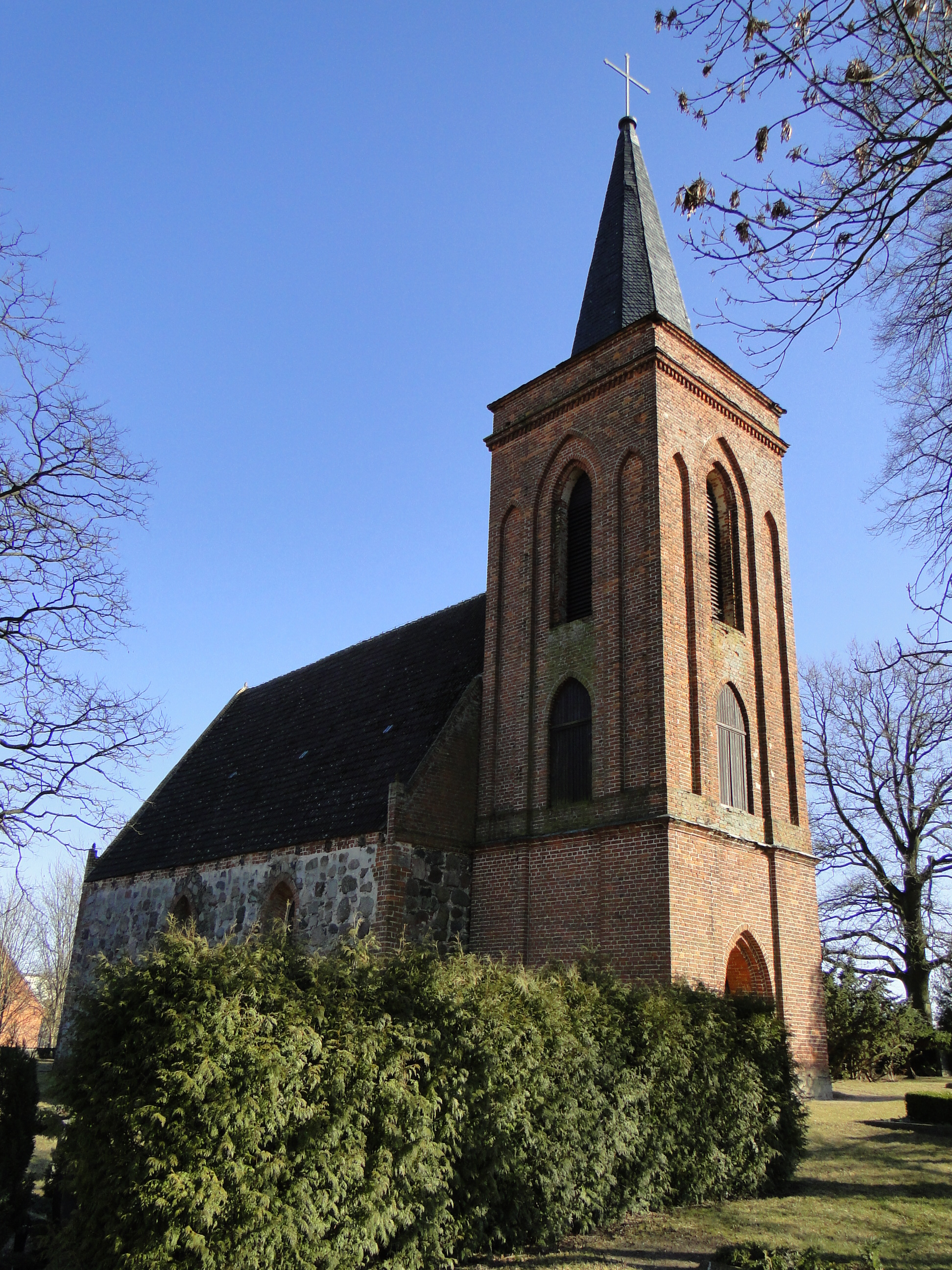
- Church in Petersdorf
- Interactive map of Petersdorf
- Location within Germany Location within Mecklenburg-Vorpommern
- Coordinates: 53°28′N 13°31′E
- Country: Germany
- State: Mecklenburg-Vorpommern
- District: Mecklenburgische Seenplatte
- Town: Woldegk

Area
  - Total: 7.79 km^{2} (3.01 sq mi)
- Elevation: 94 m (308 ft)

Population (2017-12-31)
  - Total: 148
  - Density: 19.0/km^{2} (49.2/sq mi)
- Time zone: UTC+01:00 (CET)
  - Summer (DST): UTC+02:00 (CEST)
- Postal codes: 17348
- Dialling codes: 03963
- Vehicle registration: MST
- Website: www.amt-woldegk.de

Petersdorf is a village and a former municipality in the Mecklenburgische Seenplatte district, in Mecklenburg-Vorpommern, in north-eastern Germany. Since May 2019, it is part of the town Woldegk.

== History ==
During the final stages of World War II, on 15 February 1945, the village was the site of a stopover during the German-organised march of some 6,000 Polish prisoners of war from the Oflag II-D camp headed westwards.
