= Ziemenbach =

River in Germany

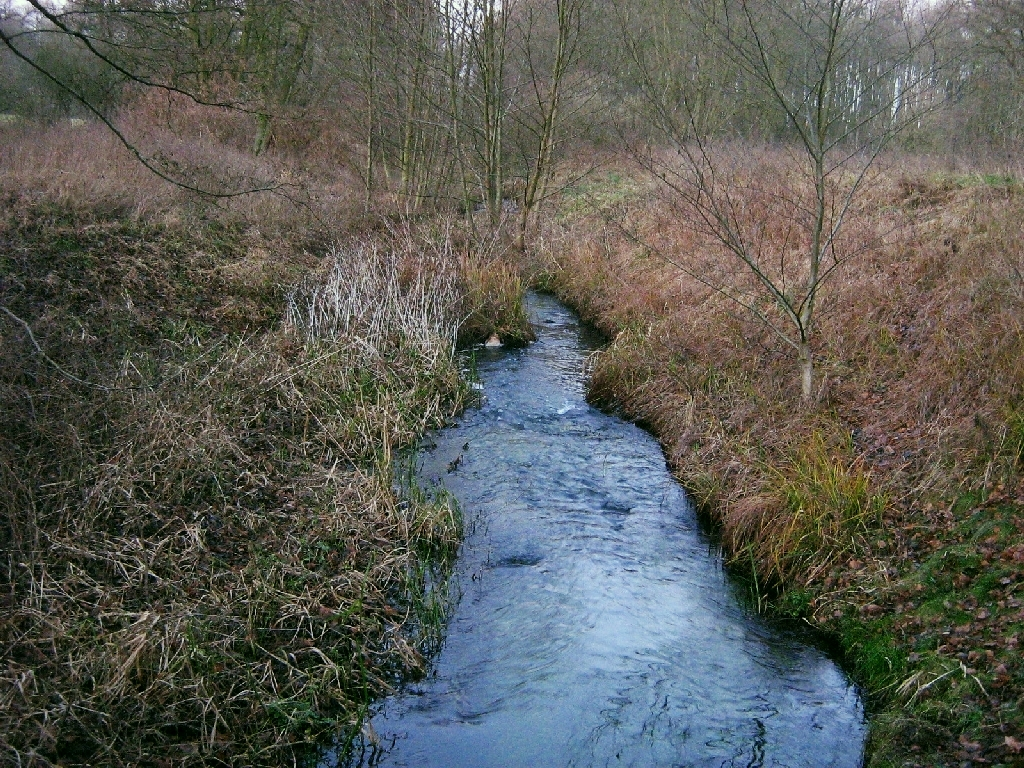

Location
- Country: Germany
- State: Mecklenburg-Vorpommern

Physical characteristics
- Mouth
  - location: Lieps
  - coordinates: 53.4568°N 13.1369°E

Basin features
- Progression: Tollense→ Peene→ Baltic Sea

Ziemenbach is a river of Mecklenburg-Vorpommern, Germany. It is a section of the upper course of river Tollense, a tributary of river Peene. The Ziemenbach discharges into the lake Lieps, which is drained by the Tollense.

== See also ==
- List of rivers of Mecklenburg-Vorpommern
