= Walther von Lüttwitz =

German general

Freiherr Walther von Lüttwitz
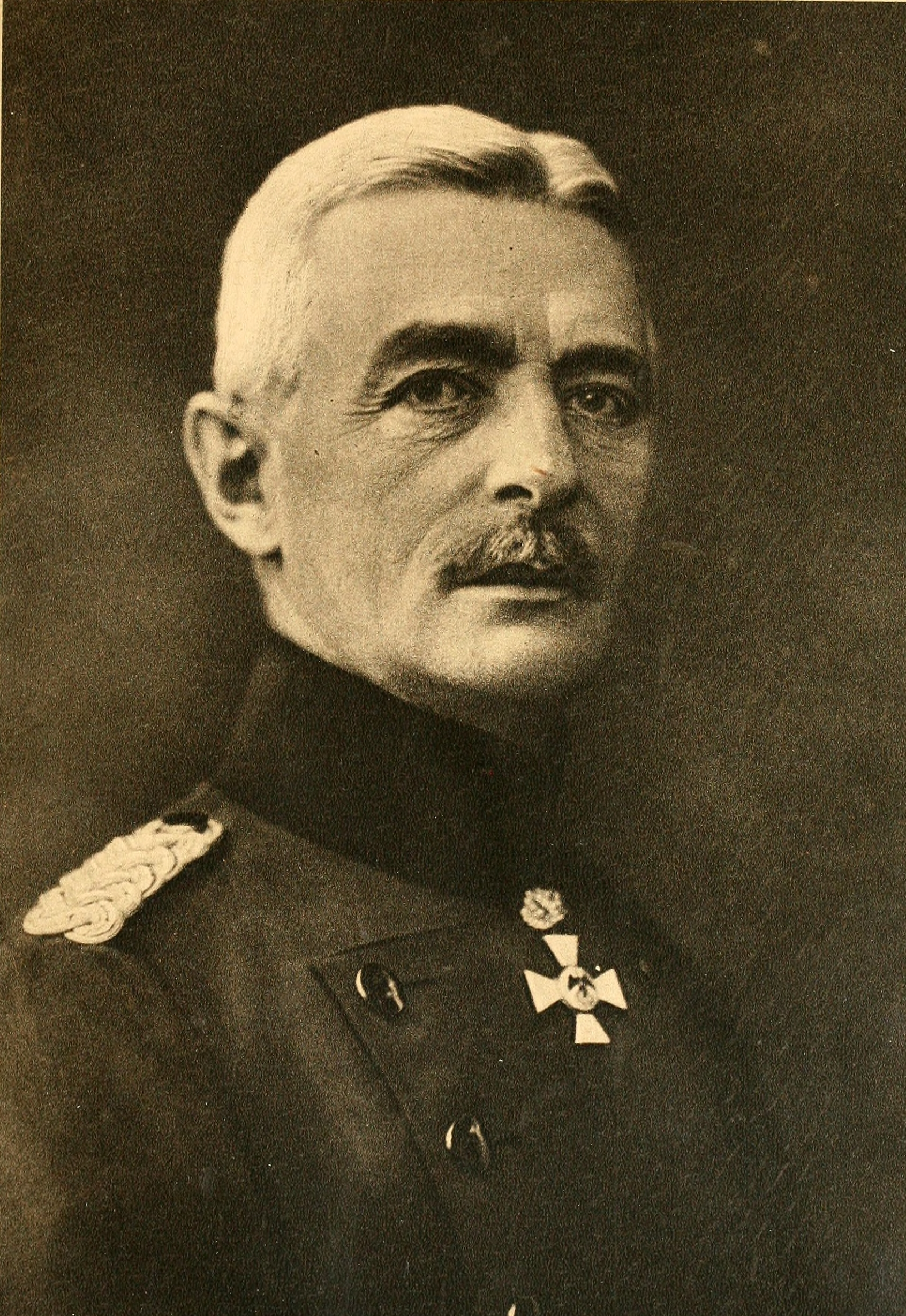
- Lüttwitz as Generalleutnant
- Born: 2 February 1859; Bodland, Landkreis Kreuzburg O.S., Province of Silesia, Kingdom of Prussia, German Confederation
- Died: 20 September 1942 (aged 83); Breslau, Gau Lower Silesia, Nazi Germany
- Relatives: Smilo Freiherr von Lüttwitz (son); Heinrich Freiherr von Lüttwitz (nephew); Kurt von Hammerstein-Equord (son-in-law)
- Military career
- Allegiance: German Empire; Kingdom of Prussia; Weimar Republic
- Branch: Imperial German Army; Prussian Army; Reichswehr
- Service years: 1878–1920
- Rank: General der Infanterie
- Conflicts: World War I; Second Battle of Champagne; Spring Offensive; German Revolution of 1918–1919; Spartacist Uprising; Kapp Putsch
- Awards: Pour le Mérite with Oak Leaves

Walther Freiherr von Lüttwitz (2 February 1859 – 20 September 1942) was a German general who fought in World War I. Lüttwitz is best known for being the driving force behind the Kapp–Lüttwitz Putsch of 1920, which attempted to replace the democratic government of the Weimar Republic with a military dictatorship.

== Early life ==
Lüttwitz was born on 2 February 1859 in the city of Bodland near Kreuzburg O.S. in Upper Silesia, then part of Prussia (now Bogacica, Poland). His father was Ernst von Lüttwitz (1823–1892), an Oberförster ("head forest warden"), Hauptmann (captain) and Deichhauptmann ("overseer of dikes"). His mother was Countess Cecile (1835–1910), the daughter of Count Heinrich Strachwitz von Groß-Zauche und Camminetz.

== Military career ==
Lüttwitz received his military training in 1878–1887, finishing as an officer. He then attended the Kriegsakademie in 1887–1890. Between 1890 and 1912, he served in various army commands. In 1912, Lüttwitz was appointed Oberquartiermeister at the Großer Generalstab (German General Staff). Crown Prince Wilhelm described him as: "mehr Truppenführer als Armeechef, mehr Blücher als Gneisenau" ("more leader of men than army chief, more Blücher than Gneisenau").

During World War I, Lüttwitz held several high military ranks. From 2 August to 26 September 1914, he was Chief of Staff of the 4th Army. He led the 33rd Division from 26 September 1914 to 28 June 1915 and the 2nd Guards Infantry Division from 29 June to 25 September. He took over command of the X Corps on 25 September from the ailing Otto von Emmich and led the corps in the Second Battle of Champagne. With Emmich's death on 22 December 1915, Lüttwitz was formally named commanding general of the corps, which he led until 20 August 1916. On 21 August 1916, he became Chief of Staff of the 5th Army (whose commander-in-chief was Prince Wilhelm) and managed to minimize the military fallout from the drain on resources of the Battle of Verdun.

On 25 November 1916, Lüttwitz was made commanding general of III Corps. Having received the Pour le Mérite on 24 August 1916, in March 1918 he was commanding general during the German spring offensive near Saint-Quentin/La Fère and for his actions received the "oak leaves" addition to this medal on 26 March 1918. In August 1918, Lüttwitz became General der Infantrie.

== Post-war ==
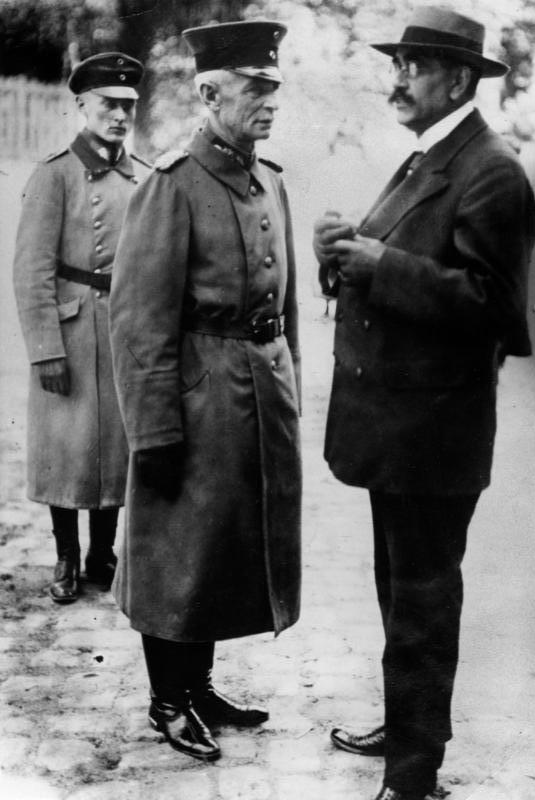
Walther von Lüttwitz (centre) with Gustav Noske (right), c. 1920

After the armistice and the German Revolution in 1918, on 28 December the Rat der Volksbeauftragten, the provisional German government, appointed him commander-in-chief of the German military in Berlin and vicinity (Befehlshaber der Truppen in und um Berlin and Oberbefehlshaber in den Marken). Besides being in command of all the regular forces of the demobilising Imperial Army in that region, he was also in charge of all the Freikorps in the area. He was called "Father of the Freikorps" as he relied heavily on these paramilitary units in late 1918 and early 1919 after the regular troops had turned out to be unreliable.

In this function, he directed the suppression of the Spartakus Uprising by the Freikorps in January 1919 under the orders of Minister of Defence Gustav Noske. In March 1919, Lüttwitz' position was renamed Oberbefehlshaber des Reichswehr-Gruppenkommandos 1. In May 1919, the government named him as supreme commander of all military troops of the Reich in case of an emergency or war. However, even at that time, Lüttwitz was making political demands outside the area of responsibility of a military commander, like outlawing strikes and abolishing unemployment insurance.

== Kapp–Lüttwitz Putsch ==
Like many members of the Reichswehr, Lüttwitz was an outspoken opponent of the Treaty of Versailles that was signed in June 1919. He was concerned that the treaty's stipulations could cause the army to disintegrate during its period of re-organisation and he especially disliked the treaty articles that demanded the reduction of the army to 100,000 men, disbandment of the Freikorps, and the extradition of about 900 men whom the Allies accused of war crimes. He planned to defy these stipulations of the treaty. As early as July 1919, Lüttwitz was involved in plots to topple the Weimar Republic and replace the government of Friedrich Ebert with a military dictatorship.

On 29 February 1920, Defence Minister Noske ordered the disbandment of two of the most powerful Freikorps, the Marinebrigade Loewenfeld and the Marinebrigade Ehrhardt. The commander of the latter, Korvettenkapitän Hermann Ehrhardt, declared that the unit would refuse to disband. On 1 March, it staged a parade without inviting Noske. Lüttwitz said at the parade that he would "not accept" the loss of such an important unit. Several of Lüttwitz's officers were horrified at this open rejection of the government's authority and tried to mediate by setting up a meeting between von Lüttwitz and the leaders of the two major right-wing parties. Lüttwitz listened to and remembered their ideas, but was not dissuaded from his course of action. Noske then removed the Marinebrigade from Lüttwitz's command. Lüttwitz ignored the order, but agreed to a meeting with President Ebert suggested by his staff.

On the evening of 10 March, Lüttwitz came with his staff to Ebert's office. Ebert had also asked Noske to attend. Lüttwitz, drawing on demands by the right-wing parties and adding his own, now demanded the immediate dissolution of the National Assembly, new elections for the Reichstag, the appointment of technocrats (Fachminister) as Secretaries for Foreign Affairs, Economics and Finance, the dismissal of General Walther Reinhardt as Chef der Heeresleitung, his own appointment as supreme commander of the regular military and the revocation of the orders of dissolution for the Marinebrigaden. Ebert and Noske rejected these demands. Noske told Lüttwitz that he expected his resignation the next day.

Instead of resigning, Lüttwitz went to Döberitz on 11 March and asked Ehrhardt whether he would be able to occupy Berlin that very evening. Ehrhardt said he needed another day, but on the morning of 13 March, he could be in the centre of Berlin with his men. Lüttwitz gave the order, and Ehrhardt began his preparations. It was only at this point that Lüttwitz brought the group known as Nationale Vereinigung into the plot. These included German National People's Party (DNVP) member Wolfgang Kapp, retired General Erich Ludendorff, as well as Waldemar Pabst and Traugott von Jagow, the last Berlin head of police in the old Reich. Their goal was to establish an authoritarian regime (though not a monarchy) with a return to the federal structure of the Empire. Lüttwitz asked them to be ready to take over the government on 13 March. Lüttwitz had not been dismissed, but only suspended from his post on 11 March.

On the morning of 13 March, the Marinebrigade reached the Brandenburger Tor, where it was met by Lüttwitz, Ludendorff, Kapp and their followers. Shortly thereafter, the putschists moved into the Reich Chancellery (Reichskanzlei). Supported by a battalion of the regular Reichswehr, they occupied the government quarter. Kapp declared himself Chancellor (Reichskanzler) and formed a provisional government. Lüttwitz served as commander of the armed forces and Minister of Defence.

Although the putsch received support from military commanders and other conservative and monarchistic groups around the Reich, the rank and file of the bureaucracy mostly refused to cooperate. A general strike, called by the legitimate government, the unions and the parties of the left, paralysed the country and made it impossible for Kapp to govern. After negotiations with those members of the legitimate government who had remained in Berlin, Kapp resigned on 17 March, but Lüttwitz tried to hold on for another day as head of a military dictatorship. When Lüttwitz offered his resignation on 18 March, Vice-Chancellor Eugen Schiffer accepted — granting him full pension rights. Schiffer also suggested Lüttwitz should leave the country until the National Assembly had decided on the question of an amnesty and even offered him a false passport and money.

== Later life ==
After the collapse of the putsch, Lüttwitz first went to Saxony and only later left for Hungary. He used a passport provided by supporters in the Berlin police department. Lüttwitz returned to Germany after an amnesty in 1924. He went back to Silesia and supported the DNVP but was not politically active. In 1931, he called for the creation of the Harzburger Front and in 1933 congratulated Wilhelm Frick on the successful Machtergreifung (take-over) by the NSDAP. His book, Im Kampf gegen die November-Republik was published in 1934.

== Personal life ==
Lüttwitz was married twice. In 1884 at Nimkau, he married Louise (1864–1918), daughter of the Austrian Hauptmann Viktor Graf von Wengersky and Eleonore Gräfin Haller von Hallerstein. In 1921 at Salzburg, he married Adelheid (1869–1956), daughter of Johann Freiherr Sardagna von Meanberg und Hohenstein and Irma von Dorner. With Louise, Lüttwitz had three daughters and a son. His son was Smilo Freiherr von Lüttwitz who served as a General in World War II and in the early Bundeswehr. His daughter Maria married Kurt von Hammerstein-Equord and was mother of Marie Luise von Hammerstein-Equord.

== Death ==
Lüttwitz died on 20 September 1942 in Breslau.

== Bibliography ==
- Berger, Florian, Mit Eichenlaub und Schwertern. Die höchstdekorierten Soldaten des Zweiten Weltkrieges. Selbstverlag Florian Berger, 2006. ISBN 3-9501307-0-5. (self-published source)
