= Bockel =

Bockel, Böckel or Boeckel is a surname. Notable people with the surname include:

- Dirk Bockel (born 1976), German-born Luxembourgian triathlete
- Hermann Böckel (1894–1984), German military officer and Iron Cross recipient
- Jean-Marie Bockel (born 1950), French politician
- Manfred Böckl (1948–2026), German writer
- Otto Böckel (1859–1923), German politician
- Tony Boeckel (1892–1924), American baseball player
- Willy Böckl (1893–1975), Austrian figure skater
