= Reinhold Hammerstein =

German musicologist (1915-2010)

Reinhold Hammerstein (9 April 1915 – 22 April 2010) was a German musicologist.

== Life and career ==
Hammerstein was born in Lämmerspiel, Hessen, son of the rektor August Hammerstein. After his Abitur, he studied musicology, history and German studies at the University of Freiburg and the Ludwig-Maximilians-Universität München. In 1940, he obtained the Academic Degree of Dr. phil. In addition, he completed an education in piano and singing.

During the Second World War, he served as a soldier in Russia, but was dismissed from military service as incurably ill due to a severe dysentery. He spent the end of the war in 1944/45 in Tengen at Lake Constance. In 1946, he was assigned lecturer of music history at the Musikhochschule Freiburg, a position he held until 1958. In 1954, his habilitation qualified him as private lecturer of musicology at the University of Freiburg, where he was appointed extraordinary professor in 1962. Between 1955 and 1956, he also held a visiting scholar position at the University of Basel. In 1963, Hammerstein accepted the call for a full professorship in musicology at the Ruprecht Karl University of Heidelberg, which he held until his retirement in 1980.

Hammerstein, who expanded the field of musicology to include iconography, married Dr. Irmgard Hueck, born in 1943, with whom he had three children. He died in 2010, at the age of 95, in Freiburg im Breisgau. One of his brothers is the historian Notker Hammerstein.

== Publications ==
- Christian Friedrich Daniel Schubart, ein schwäbisch-alemannischer Dichter-Musiker der Goethezeit, Dissertation 1943
- Die Musik der Engel : Untersuchungen zur Musikanschauung des Mittelalters, Habilitationsschrift, Francke, Bern, Munich, 1962
- Die Musik in Dantes Divina Commedia In Deutsches Dante-Jahrbuch 41/42, 1964
- Tanz und Musik des Todes. Die mittelalterlichen Totentänze und ihr Nachleben. Francke, Bern 1980, ISBN 3-7720-1460-7.
- Macht und Klang : tönende Automaten als Realität und Fiktion in der alten und mittelalterlichen Welt, Francke, Bern, 1986
- Von gerissenen Saiten und singenden Zikaden : Studien zur Emblematik der Musik, Francke, Tübingen, Basel, 1994
- Die Stimme aus der anderen Welt : über die Darstellung des Numinosen in der Oper von Monteverdi bis Mozart, Schneider, Tutzing, 1998
