= Kurt von Hammerstein-Equord =

German general (1878–1943)

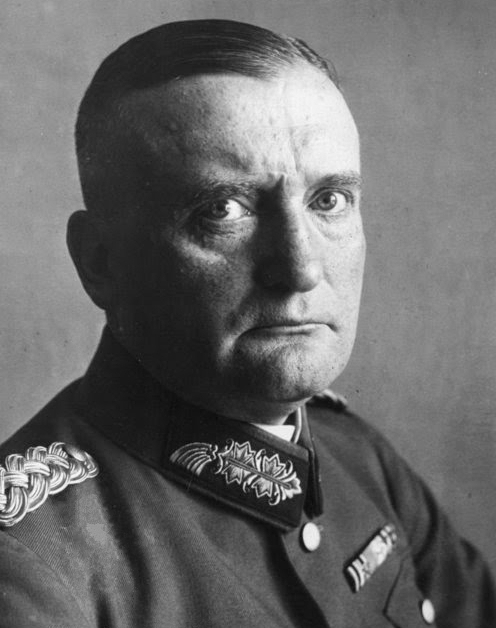
- Hammerstein-Equord in 1930

4th Chief of the German Army Command Weimar Republic
- In office 1 November 1930 – 31 January 1934
- President: Paul von Hindenburg
- Preceded by: Wilhelm Heye
- Succeeded by: Werner von Fritsch

6th Chief of the Troop Office
- In office 30 September 1929 – 31 October 1930
- Preceded by: Werner von Blomberg
- Succeeded by: Wilhelm Adam

Personal details
- Born: 26 September 1878 Hinrichshagen, Grand Duchy of Mecklenburg-Strelitz, German Empire
- Died: 24 April 1943 (aged 64) Berlin, Prussia, Nazi Germany
- Relations: Maria Therese von Hammerstein (daughter); Marie Luise von Hammerstein (daughter); Walther von Lüttwitz (father in law); Smilo Freiherr von Lüttwitz (brother in law)
- Known for: German resistance to Nazism

Military service
- Allegiance: German Empire; Weimar Republic; Nazi Germany
- Branch/service: Imperial German Army; Reichswehr
- Years of service: 1898–1934; 1939
- Rank: Generaloberst
- Battles/wars: World War I

Kurt Gebhard Adolf Philipp Freiherr von Hammerstein-Equord (26 September 1878 – 24 April 1943) was a German general (Generaloberst) who was the Commander-in-Chief of the Reichswehr, the Weimar Republic's armed forces. He is regarded as "an undisguised opponent" of Adolf Hitler and the Nazi regime.

== Early life ==
Hammerstein was born to a noble family, which had already produced several famous officers, in Hinrichshagen, Mecklenburg-Strelitz, German Empire in 1878. His parents were the head forester (Oberförster) of the Grand Duchy of Mecklenburg-Strelitz, Heino von Hammerstein, and his wife Ida, née Gustedt (also from a noble family). After his initial schooling, Hammerstein joined the Cadet Corps in Plön in 1888 at the age of ten, followed by the Prussian Cadet Corps Berlin-Lichterfelde in 1893. He officially entered the Imperial German Army on 15 March 1898 upon his promotion to lieutenant (Secondelieutenant) in the 3rd Foot Guards.

In 1907, Hammerstein-Equord married Maria von Lüttwitz, the daughter of Walther von Lüttwitz

The future Chancellor Kurt von Schleicher (1882–1934) served in the same unit with Hammerstein, and they soon became friends. From 1905 to 1907, Hammerstein served in Kassel. From 1907 to 1910, he attended the Prussian Military Academy (Kriegsakademie) and in 1911, he was posted to the deployment section of the Great General Staff.

During the First World War, Hammerstein served as adjutant of Georg von Waldersee and then as a General Staff officer in various military units, including as a First General Staff Officer of the VIII Reserve Corps in 1915, at the Great General Staff in 1916, and as first General Staff Officer in charge of operations and tactics in the staff of a General Command in 1918.

In 1914, Hammerstein commanded a company in Flanders, where he earned the Iron Cross. In 1916, he participated in the Battle of Turtucaia during the Romanian Campaign. He was promoted to major in 1917.

== Weimar Republic ==
Upon the declaration of the Weimar Republic, Hammerstein was transferred to the Reichswehr. He served under his father-in-law, General Walther von Lüttwitz, in the staff of the Freikorps Lüttwitz in 1919 and was promoted to lieutenant colonel one year later. That year, he refused to participate in the Kapp Putsch, which was supported by Lüttwitz. He subsequently transferred to Group Command II, based in Kassel, as its chief of staff.

In 1922, he became a battalion commander in the Munich area. In 1924, he was transferred to the staff of Military District III in Berlin. In 1929, he briefly served in the Group Command I. On 1 October 1929, he was promoted to Major General and named chief of the Truppenamt, becoming the de facto chief of the General Staff. In the Weimar Republic, the renaming was necessary as the Great General Staff had been prohibited by the Allies in the Treaty of Versailles after the First World War. His predecessor was General Werner von Blomberg, who had come into conflict with the government over the possibility of a two-front war against both France and Poland, which he deemed as favorable. By contrast, Reichswehrminister Wilhelm Groener and Chancellor Heinrich Brüning preferred Hammerstein's aversion to political extremism and military risks.

Hammerstein worked out first tactical concepts for the army to provide for a sustained defence in case of an attack until the League of Nations intervened. However, in 1930, he created the first mobilization plan since 1923, which sought to triple the number of infantry divisions from seven to 21. In 1930, General Wilhelm Heye, Commander-in-Chief of the Reichswehr, retired. Now defense minister, Schleicher, with support from Brüning, made Hammerstein Heye's successor. On 1 November 1930, he assumed the post with a simultaneous promotion to General of Infantry. Hammerstein quickly created a rearmament program, demanding the formation of at least 42 divisions.

As a close friend of Kurt von Schleicher, Hammerstein repeatedly warned President Paul von Hindenburg of the dangers of appointing Adolf Hitler, the leader of the National Socialist German Workers' Party, as Reich Chancellor. In response, Hindenburg assured Hammerstein that "he would not even consider making that Austrian corporal the minister of defense or the chancellor".

However, barely four days later, on 30 January 1933, pursuant to a request by Hindenburg, Hitler formed a cabinet as Chancellor in a coalition with the German National People's Party. Because of his opposition to Hitler, Hammerstein tendered his resignation in October 1933. It was accepted in December and became effective on 31 January 1934. He was succeeded by General Werner von Fritsch.

== Nazi Germany ==
=== Night of the Long Knives ===
From 30 June 1934, Hitler implemented a program of large-scale arrests, murders, intimidation and elimination of suspected and known opponents, under the pretext of an imminent coup by SA-Chief Ernst Röhm. Some prominent opponents like Hammerstein and former Chancellor Franz von Papen were not affected by the purge, possibly thanks to a personal request by Hindenburg, according to some historians. In a report conducted by communist agents, however, it was said that Hammerstein "is in these days, the center of Berlin officer circles". Comrades from the Ministry would have protected him "since they had feared at any moment his arrest". General Erwin von Witzleben together with the generals Wilhelm von Leeb and Gerd von Rundstedt, demanded an investigation of the murders of Schleicher and Ferdinand von Bredow from Commander-in-Chief Fritsch. Among those officers who protested the killing of their comrades was Major Hans Oster.

Hammerstein and Field Marshal August von Mackensen attempted first to reach Hindenburg personally to stop the purge. On 18 July, they sent him a memorandum in a blue file folder, the so-called Blue Book. According to others, it did not reach Hindenburg before his death. On 13 July 1934, Hitler tried to justify the purge in a Reichstag speech, notably by accusing Schleicher and Bredow of subversive collaboration with Röhm and conspiracy with other countries for the purpose of a "national-Bolshevik coup". Criticism of said accusations by military personnel was not supported by Minister of War Werner von Blomberg, who upheld Hitler's claims and promised evidence.

However, when such evidence did not appear, and criticism continued, Hitler finally gave in. In a closed meeting about another topic, with leading elements of the government, the party and the Reichswehr present, Hitler said "studies" had shown that Generals Schleicher and von Bredow had been shot "by mistake". However, that information was to be kept secret, and all military officers were forbidden to attend Schleicher's funeral. Defying that order, Hammerstein sought to attend the funeral and was enraged when the SS refused to allow him to attend the service and confiscated the wreaths that the mourners had brought.

=== Second World War ===
At the beginning of the Second World War, Hammerstein was briefly recalled to military service. On 10 September 1939, he was named as commander of Army Detachment A, which guarded the western borders during the Invasion of Poland.

Hammerstein was transferred to command Wehrkreis (Defense District) VIII in Silesia and was relieved from his command by Hitler for his "negative attitude towards National Socialism". Hammerstein retired again on 21 September 1939 but continued to be active in the German Resistance. Hammerstein-Equord was involved in several plots to overthrow Hitler, including in the run-up of the failed 20 July 1944 plot.

== Illness, death and legacy ==
Years before his death, Hammerstein had developed a slow-growing mass below his left ear but declined to seek medical advice. In January 1943, Doctor Ferdinand Sauerbruch informed him that he had cancer, which had by then metastasized. Surgery, the only potentially curative treatment at the time, was thus futile, and Hammerstein was told that he was expected to survive for only six months. Although his medical team admitted that the cancer had advanced beyond any hope of recovery, Hammerstein underwent radiation treatment, causing serious side-effects and great discomfort. His son, Kunrat, ordered that the therapy be discontinued after he had been informed that the treatment was purely palliative.

Hammerstein-Equord spent the final weeks of his life in considerable pain in his house in Dahlem, an affluent district of Berlin. Although he was aware that he was under surveillance by the Gestapo, he continued to voice his criticism of the regime to visitors. Among them, the art historian Udo von Alvensleben noted in his diary after meeting him in mid-February 1943:

"I am ashamed to have belonged in an army, that witnessed and tolerated all the crimes", is Hammerstein's final conclusion.

On 16 April, agents of the Gestapo and SD visited Hammerstein after which he fell into a coma from which he never recovered. He died in his home on 24 April 1943. His family refused an official funeral at Berlin's Invalidenfriedhof because that would have meant that his coffin would have been draped in the Reichskriegsflagge with the swastika. He was instead interred at the family grave in Steinhorst, Lower Saxony. Hitler ordered the sending of a wreath with a message of condolence, but the wreath was not on display at the funeral since it had been "forgotten" in a Berlin subway by Hammerstein's family.

Heinrich Brüning, the leader of the Center Party who had served as chancellor between 1930 and 1932, called Hammerstein-Equord "the only man who could remove Hitler — a man without nerves". According to the memoirs of Kunrat von Hammerstein, Hammerstein-Equord had spoken of "organized mass murder" of the Jews before the summer of 1942. He supplied his daughter Maria-Therese von Hammerstein-Paasche with the names of Jews who were scheduled for deportation or arrest to enable her to warn or to hide them. Two of his sons, Ludwig and Kunrat, took part in the plot to replace the Nazi regime with a new government on 20 July 1944, and fled Germany after its failure. His widow and two younger children were deported to a concentration camp and freed only after the Allies had liberated the camps in 1945.

== Family and children ==
At home, von Hammerstein-Equord reported planned actions against Jewish and other persecuted people so that his elder children could warn their many Jewish contacts. Two of his daughters, Marie Luise von Hammerstein and Helga von Hammerstein, had been members of the secret service of the Communist Party of Germany since the late 1920s and helped to inform the Soviet Union on Hitler's political and military intentions, which the latter had detailed in a secret speech to leading generals on 3 February 1933.

Marie Luise von Hammerstein (1908–1999), later Marie Luise Freifrau von Münchhausen, was a friend of Werner Scholem, who was shot at KZ Buchenwald in 1940. From 1937 until 1951 she was in a second marriage with Ernst-Friedemann Freiherr von Münchhausen. The couple separated after the war. Marie Luise moved in 1949 from West Berlin to East Berlin, and became a member of the SED, working as a lawyer mostly for Jewish clients.

Helga von Hammerstein-Equord (1913–2005) met Leo Roth when she was 15, left school at 17, and joined the KPD. She helped connect agent Gert Caden to the KPD. Helga worked for the secret service of the KPD under the code name "Grete Pelgert" at least until 1937, when Roth was executed as a traitor in Moscow. She obtained a doctorate in chemistry from the Kaiser Wilhelm Institute in 1939.

His daughter Maria Therese von Hammerstein Paasche (1909-2000) was an anti-Nazi activist who transported Jews out of Germany in the early years of the Nazi regime and later emigrated to Japan where she lived for several years before settling in the United States.

Kunrat von Hammerstein-Equord (1918–2007) served as an armored reconnaissance officer in Poland and on the western front. After being injured he was found unfit for front duty and served on the home front as a staff officer and instructor. He did not belong to the active military resistance, but was personally acquainted with many of those who were and was marginally involved with the 20 July plot in Berlin. Fearing arrest, he went into hiding in Cologne in September 1944. Later, like his brother Ludwig, he was charged by the Reichskriminalpolizeiamt-Berlin with desertion, but evaded arrest. After the war, he published parts of his diaries as well as records of his father.

Ludwig von Hammerstein-Equord (1919–1996) had served as an infantry officer on the Russian front and was equally barred from frontline service following a war injury, but joined the military resistance against Hitler. On 20 July 1944, he witnessed the arrest of other members of the resistance in the Bendlerblock. He was able to escape and lived in the Berlin underground until the war ended. After the war, he wrote two biographies of his father.

Franz Freiherr von Hammerstein-Equord (1921–2011) was an industrial merchant. After 20 July 1944, he was a so-called Sippenhäftling (prisoner of kin). He was deported along with his mother and sister Hildur. He survived the war, studied theology and subsequently worked in several Christian, social, and political organisations.

== Personality ==
Hammerstein-Equord had a reputation for independence and indolence, favoring hunting and shooting over the labors of administration. He told his friends that the only thing hampering his career was "a need for personal comfort". He was an aloof and sarcastic man, renowned for his cutting displays of disregard. Hammerstein-Equord regarded himself as a servant of the German state, not of its political parties. He was extremely hostile to the Nazi Party, as late as 1933 referring to the Nazis as "criminal gang and perverts" (German: Verbrecherbande und Schweinigels), the latter an allusion to the homosexual tendencies of some SA leaders. He earned the nickname The Red General for fraternizing with trade unionists. Hammerstein-Equord personally warned Adolf Hitler in December 1932 against trying a coup, promising he would give the order to shoot in that case. He made reassurances to the same effect to the American Ambassador Frederic M. Sackett.

== Classification of officers ==
As Chief of the Army High Command, Hammerstein-Equord oversaw the composition of the German manual on military unit command (Truppenführung), dated 17 October 1933.

He conceived of a classification scheme for officers:

I distinguish four types. There are clever, hardworking, stupid, and lazy officers. Usually two characteristics are combined. Some are clever and hardworking; their place is the General Staff. The next ones are stupid and lazy; they make up 90 percent of every army and are suited to routine duties. Anyone who is both clever and lazy is qualified for the highest leadership duties, because he possesses the mental clarity and strength of nerve necessary for difficult decisions. One must beware of anyone who is both stupid and hardworking; he must not be entrusted with any responsibility because he will always only cause damage.

== Popular culture ==
A fictionalized version of Hammerstein is featured in the German neo-noir series Babylon Berlin as Generalmajor Wilhelm von Seegers. Seegers, like Hammerstein, is depicted as a prominent member of the Reichswehr (and associate of the Black Reichswehr) who nevertheless was a vocal opponent of the Nazis. His relationship with his daughter, Malu Seegers, also resembles Hammerstein's own complicated relationship with Marie Luise von Hammerstein.

== Decorations and awards ==
- Prussian Royal House Order of Hohenzollern, Knight's Cross with Swords
- 1914 Iron Cross 1st Class
- 1914 Iron Cross 2nd Class
- Bavarian Military Merit Order, 4th Class with Swords
- Saxon Albert Order, Knight 1st Class with Swords
- Mecklenburg-Strelitz Cross for Distinction in War, 1st and 2nd Classes
- Mecklenburg-Schwerin Military Merit Cross, 1st and 2nd Classes
- Lübeck Hanseatic Cross
- Austro-Hungarian Military Merit Cross, 3rd Class with War Decoration
- Knight of Honor (Ehrenritter) of the Johanniter-Orden
- Prussian 25-Year Long Service Cross for Officers

== Sources ==
- Hans Magnus Enzensberger, The Silences of Hammerstein, Seagull Books, 2009
- Correlli Barnett, editor, Hitler's Generals, Grove Press, 2003
- Bernard V. Burke, Ambassador Frederic Sackett and the Collapse of the Weimar Republic, 1930-1933, Cambridge University Press, 2003
- Bruce Condell, David T. Zabecki, editors and translators, On the German Art of War: Truppenführung, Lynne Rienner, 2001
- Joachim Fest, Plotting Hitler's Death: The Story of German Resistance, Owl, 1997
- Hans Magnus Enzensberger, editor, Hammerstein oder der Eigensinn. Eine deutsche Geschichte. Frankfurt am Main: Suhrkamp 2008. ISBN 978-3-518-41960-1
- Peter Hoffmann, The History of the German Resistance, 1933-1945, McGill-Queen's University Press, 1996
- Klaus-Jürgen Müller, Das Heer und Hitler: Armee und nationalsozialistisches Regime, 1933–1940, Stuttgart, 1969
- Louis L. Snyder, Encyclopaedia of the Third Reich, Contemporary Publishing Company, 1998
- Roderick Stackelberg, The Nazi Germany Sourcebook: An Anthology of Texts, Routledge, 2002
- J. P. Stern, Hitler: The Führer and the People, University of California Press, 1975
- Andreas Wirsching, "Man kann nur Boden germanisieren". Eine neue Quelle zu Hitlers Rede vor den Spitzen der Reichswehr am 3. Februar 1933, Vierteljahrshefte für Zeitgeschichte vol.40, no.3, pp. 517–550
