= Lieps =

Lake in Mecklenburg-Vorpommern, Germany

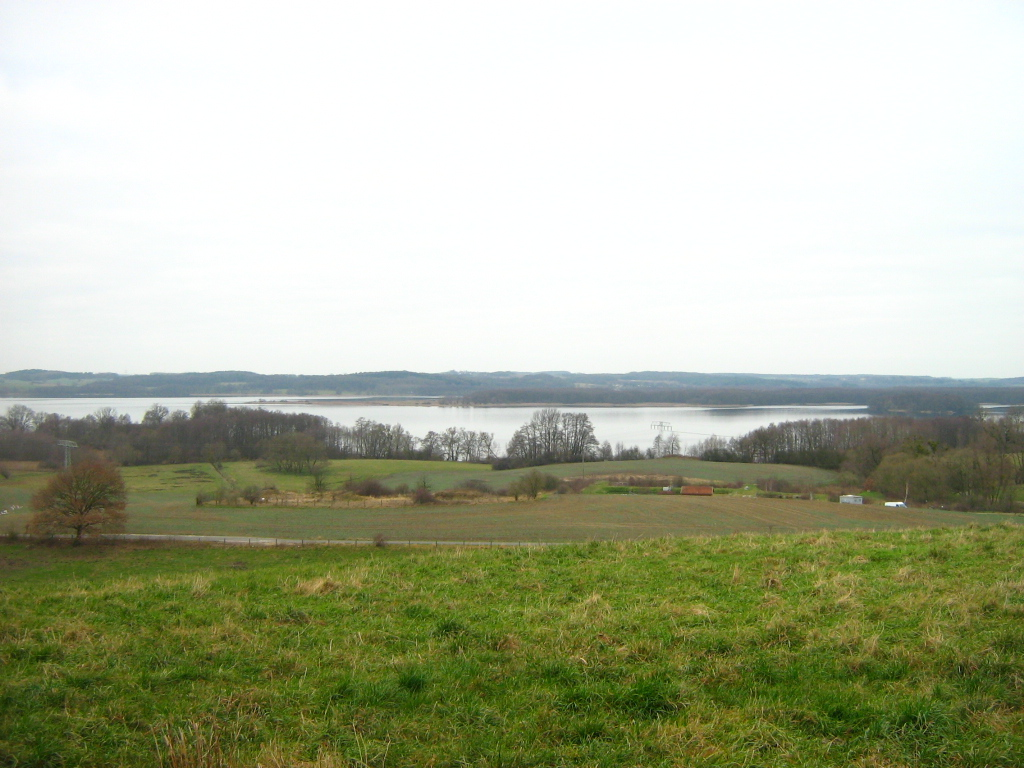

- Location within Mecklenburg-Vorpommern
- Location: Mecklenburg-Vorpommern
- Coordinates: 53°27′4″N 13°9′26″E
- Primary inflows: Ziemenbach
- Basin countries: Germany
- Max. length: 2,899 m (9,511 ft)
- Max. width: 2,470 m (8,100 ft)
- Surface area: 4.31 km^{2} (1.66 sq mi)
- Average depth: 2.3 m (7 ft 7 in)
- Max. depth: 3.6 m (12 ft)
- Water volume: 9,700,000 m^{3} (340,000,000 cu ft)
- Surface elevation: 14.8 m (49 ft)

Lieps is a lake in Mecklenburg-Vorpommern, Germany. At an elevation of 14.8 m, its surface area is 4.31 km².
