= Woldegk =

Town in Mecklenburg-Vorpommern, Germany

- Town
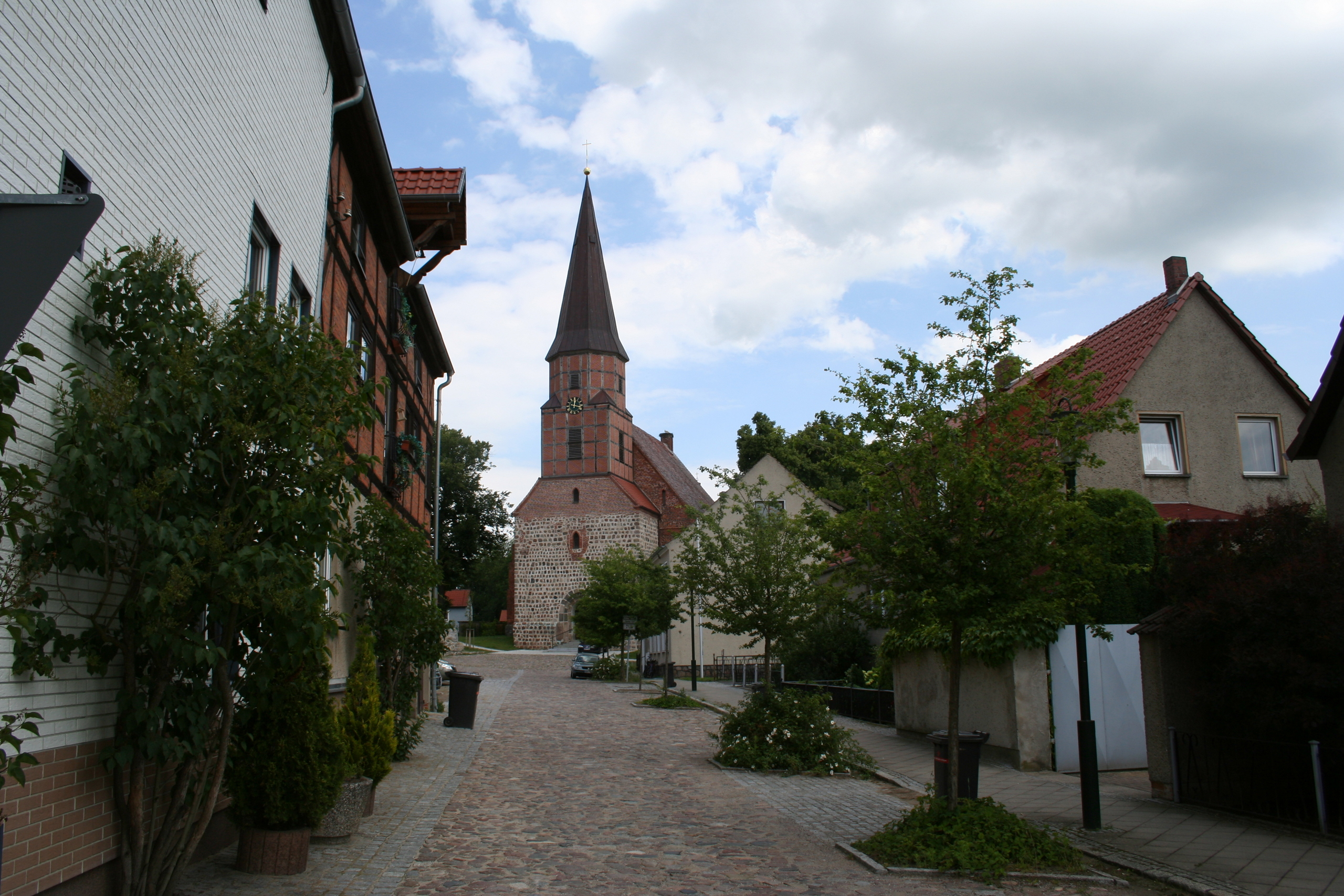

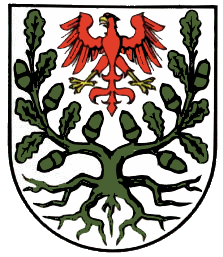
- Coat of arms

- Location of Woldegk within Mecklenburgische Seenplatte district
- Interactive map of Woldegk
- Location within Germany Location within Mecklenburg-Vorpommern
- Coordinates: 53°27′34″N 13°34′58″E
- Country: Germany
- State: Mecklenburg-Vorpommern
- District: Mecklenburgische Seenplatte
- Municipal assoc.: Woldegk

Government
  - Mayor: Ernst-Jürgen Lode

Area
  - Total: 164.17 km^{2} (63.39 sq mi)
- Elevation: 110 m (360 ft)

Population (2025-12-31)
  - Total: 4,004
  - Density: 24.39/km^{2} (63.17/sq mi)
- Time zone: UTC+01:00 (CET)
  - Summer (DST): UTC+02:00 (CEST)
- Postal codes: 17348
- Dialling codes: 03963, 03964, 039859
- Vehicle registration: MST
- Website: www.windmuehlenstadt-woldegk.de

Woldegk (German pronunciation: [ˈvɔldɛk]) is a town in the Mecklenburgische Seenplatte district, in Mecklenburg-Western Pomerania, in north-eastern Germany. It is situated 24 km southeast of Neubrandenburg. Woldegk is 164.14 km^{2} in area and has 4,392 inhabitants (2018).

== History ==
After first being settled as an adjunct of Brandenburg in 1236, Woldegk was brought into Mecklenburg by the marriage of Beatrix of Brandenburg with Heinrich of Mecklenburg in 1292, and developed into a fortified, walled town with ramparts and moats by the mid-15th century. Between 1492 and 1635, at least four windmills were constructed and put into use milling grain produced in the surrounding agricultural area.

The village was damaged by fire several times, and was completely destroyed in 1647 in the Thirty Years War, after which only 14 inhabitants survived. In the 18th century, the village was rebuilt and as many as seven Dutch style windmills were in operation by 1745.

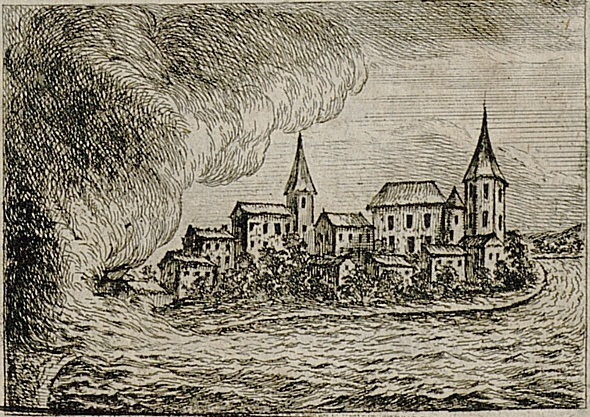
Copper engraving depicting the 1764 Woldegk tornado

On 29 June 1764, a deadly F5 tornado hit the town. The tornado was among the strongest ever recorded with damage assessed at the highest level of the TORRO scale (T11). The rating was assigned based on several surveys by German scientist Gottlob Burchard Genzmer.

The town remained economically backward until the late 19th century, when construction of the Friedrich Willhelm Railway in 1893 fostered industrial development, including a sugar beet plant, a steam plow factory, and two brickyards. Municipal services also were developed, including a gas plant and a water tower and distribution system. During this period, many substantial commercial and buildings as well as a distinctive town hall were constructed and gave Woldegk a more cosmopolitan flavor, although it remained essentially a rural village.

During the final stages of World War II, on 15 February 1945, the present-day district of Petersdorf was the site of a stopover during the German-organised march of some 6,000 Polish prisoners of war from the Oflag II-D camp headed westwards. In World War II, at least 70% of Woldegk was destroyed. At the end of the war in 1945, the interior of the stone St. Peter's Evangelical Lutheran Church was gutted by fire when a phosphorus bomb dropped through the roof, killing a number of refugees from the surrounding area who had taken shelter there. After the war, reconstruction took place in the German Democratic Republic. Following reunification of Germany, the region surrounding Woldegk has declined economically, and remains one of the poorest areas of the country.

The former municipality of Petersdorf was merged into Woldegk in May 2019.

== Sights ==
In the late 20th century, some of the distinctive historic windmills of Woldegk were rebuilt and refurbished, one of which is open as a museum, and the mill pond also has been rebuilt. Tourist literature and the town's motto promote Woldegk as the Town of Windmills (Stadt der Windmühlen). Efforts to restore the church, the stone foundation of which dates back to 1236–1250, are still underway.

== Transport ==
Woldegk is located at the intersection of federal highways B 104 (Neubrandenburg-Szczecin) and B 198 (Neustrelitz-Prenzlau).

== Economy ==
FWW Fahrzeugwerk GmbH was founded in 2001 as defense technology company, to repair wheeled and tracked vehicles and components, "partnering with the Bundeswehr, NATO, Western European countries and the United Nations". In November 2018, General Dynamics Corporation acquired FWW and it became General Dynamics European Land Systems - FWW GmbH in November 2019.

== Notable residents ==
- Rudolf Doehn (1821–1895), writer and politician
- Kurt von Hammerstein-Equord (1878–1943), general

== Gallery ==
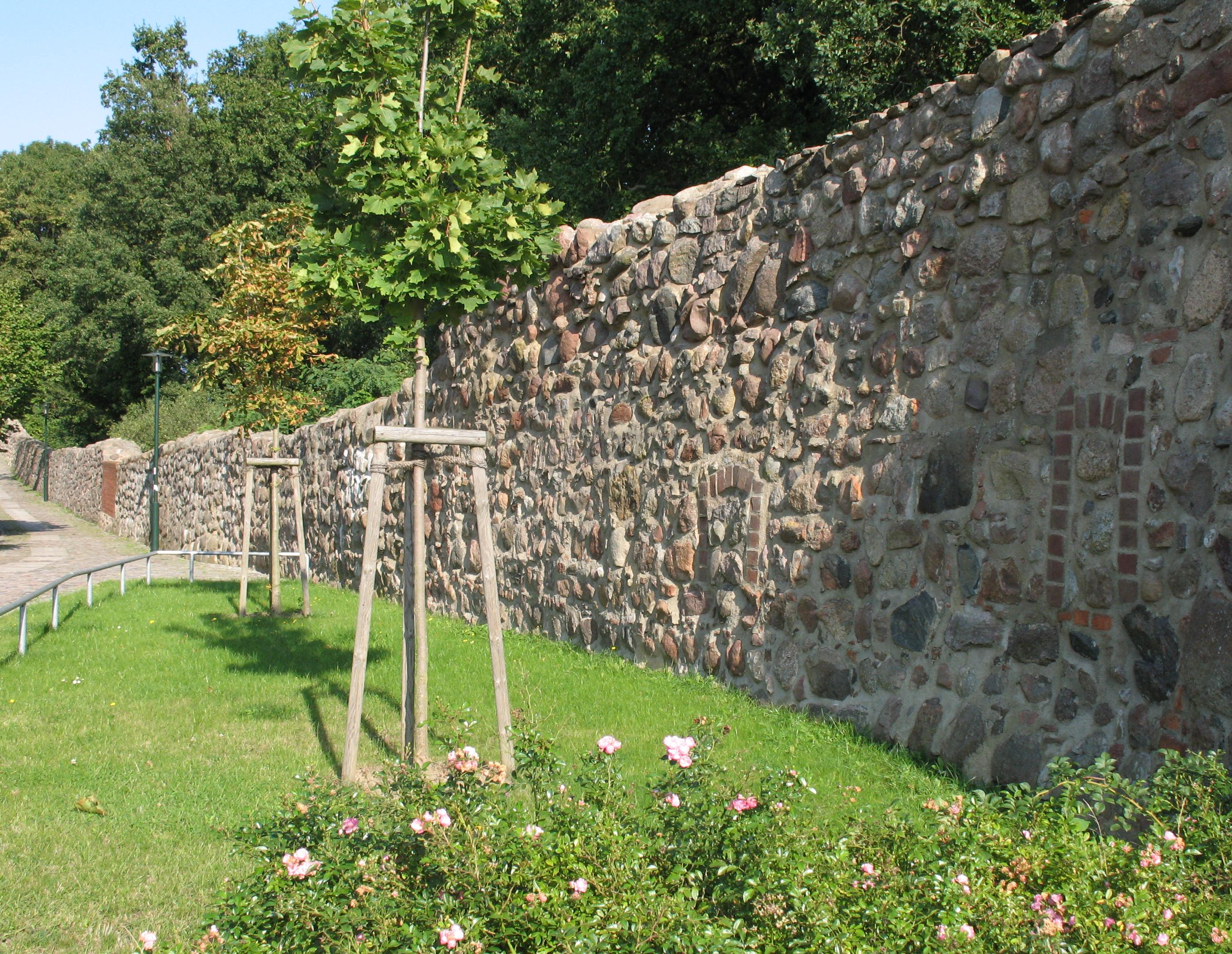
Town wall

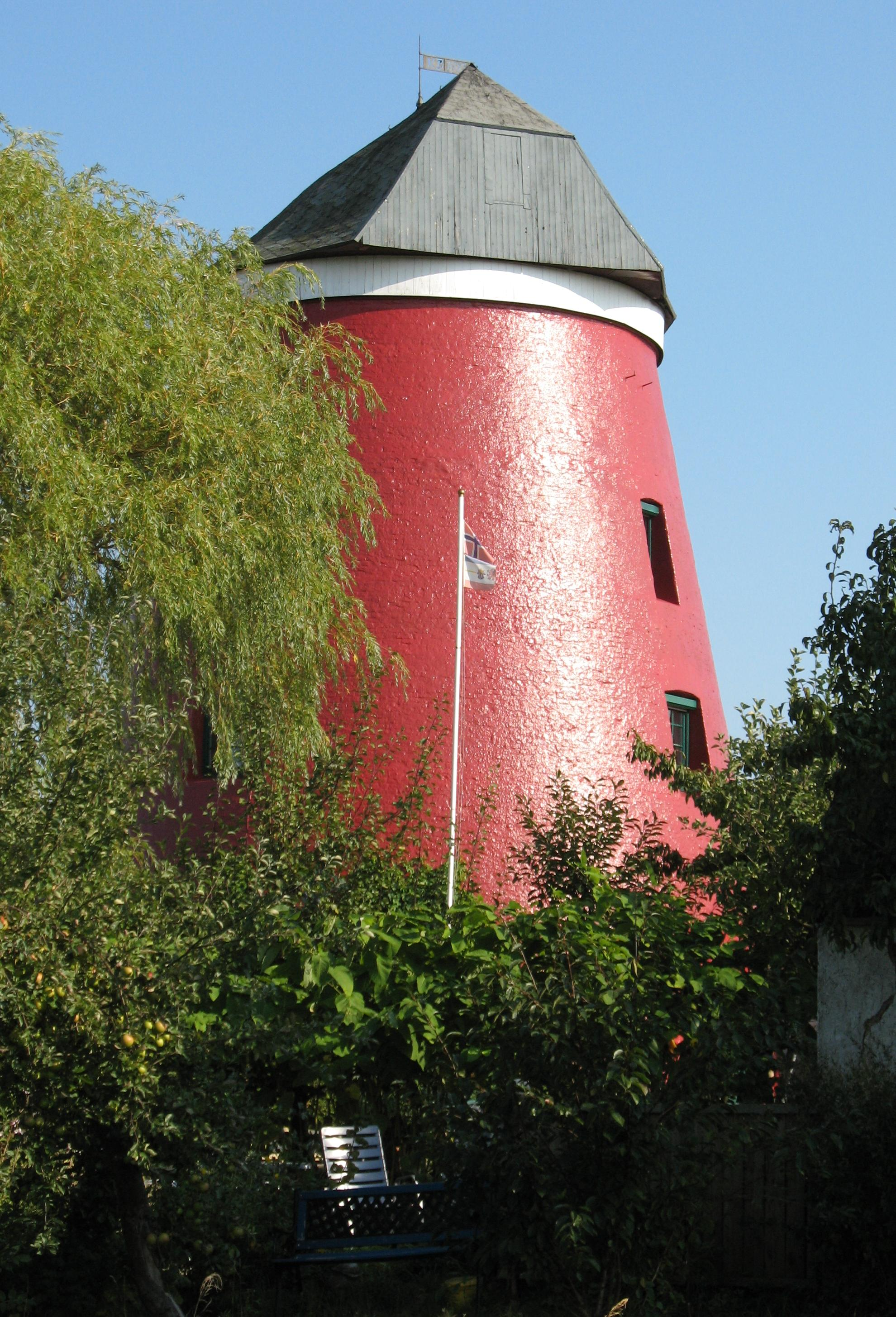
Old windmill

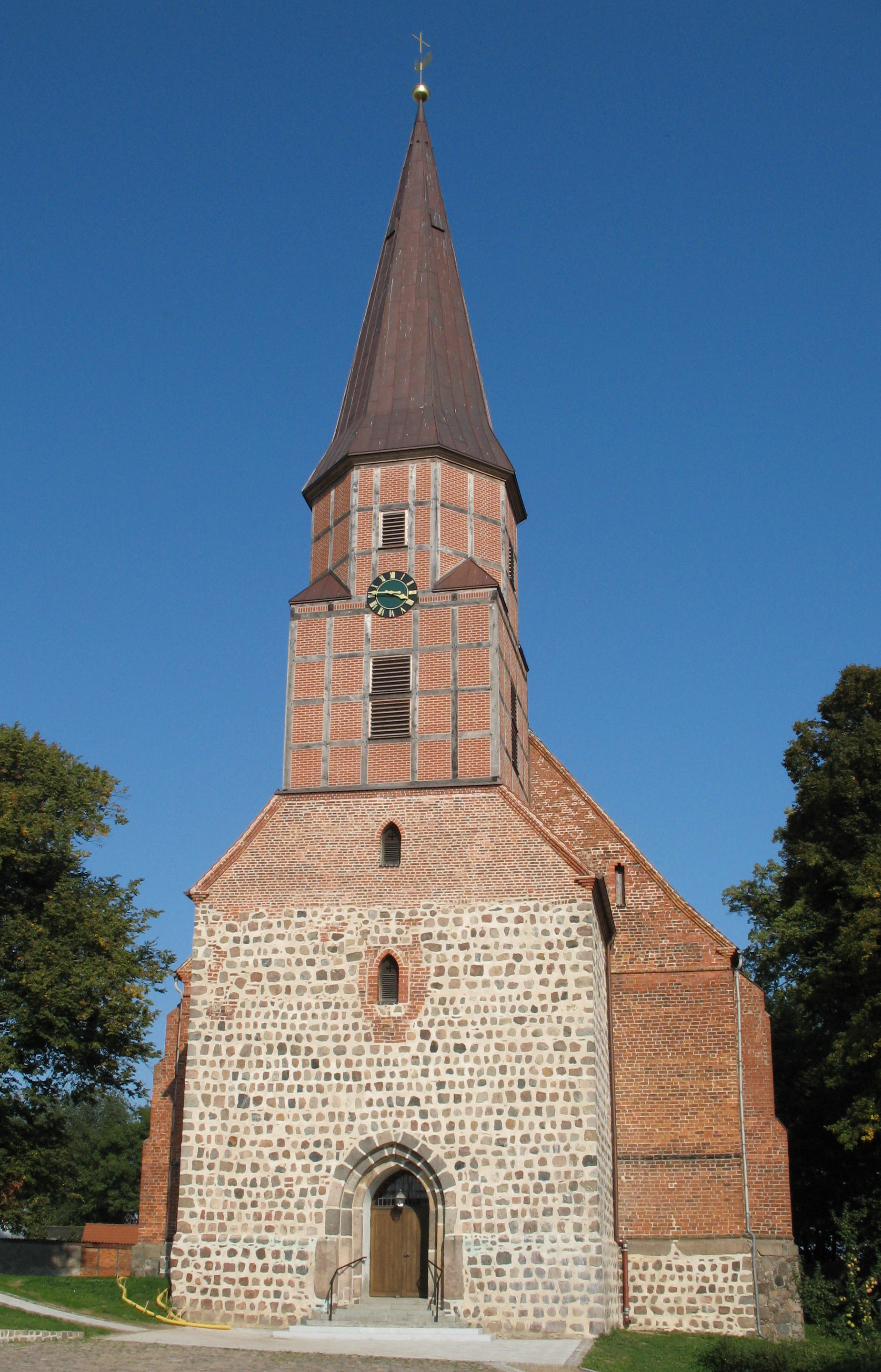
Saint Peter church
