= Tollensesee =

Lake in Mecklenburg-Vorpommern, Germany

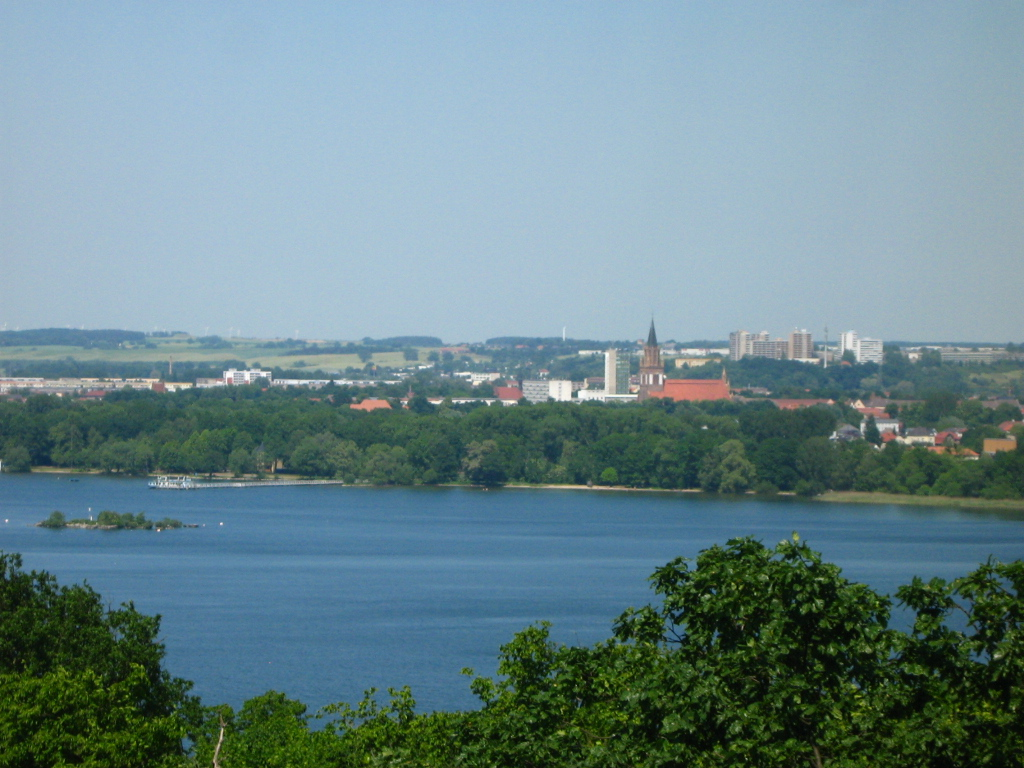
- Lake Tollensesee with the city of Neubrandenburg behind

- Location within Mecklenburg-Vorpommern
- Location: Mecklenburg-Vorpommern
- Coordinates: 53°30′26″N 13°12′41″E
- Primary inflows: upper course of Tollense, Nonnenbach de
- Primary outflows: Tollense
- Basin countries: Germany
- Surface area: 17.4 km^{2} (6.7 sq mi)
- Max. depth: 46 m (151 ft)
- Surface elevation: 14.8 m (49 ft)
- Settlements: Neubrandenburg

Tollensesee is a zungenbecken lake in Mecklenburg-Vorpommern, Germany. It belongs to the Mecklenburg Lake District. At an elevation of 14.8 m, its surface area is 17.4 km². Its maximum depth is about 46 m. The lake is 10.4 km long and between 1.5 and 2.5 km wide. The entire lake lies within the administrative area of the city of Neubrandenburg. In the south part of the lake there is island Fischerinsel.

== See also ==
- Mecklenburgischer Seen-Radweg
