= Oscar Hammerstein (lawyer) =

Dutch lawyer

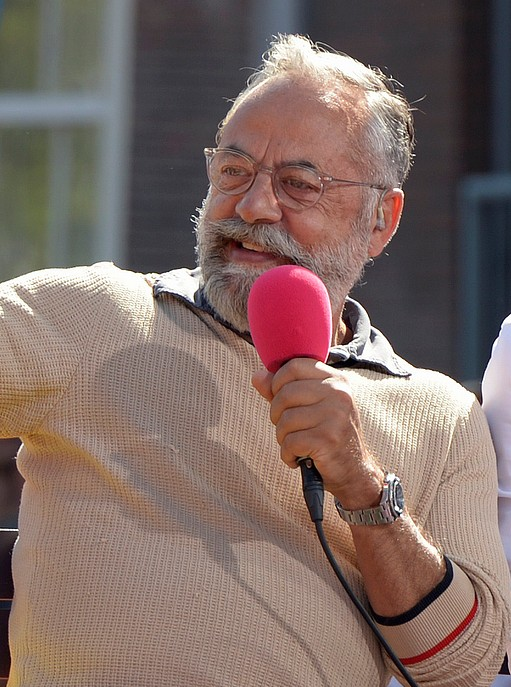
- Oscar Hammerstein at the Amsterdam Gay Pride in 2016
- Born: February 20, 1954 (age 72); Rotterdam, South Holland, Netherlands
- Education: University of Leiden
- Occupation: Lawyer

Oscar Hammerstein (born February 20, 1954) is a former Dutch lawyer.

== Personal life ==
=== Early years ===
Hammerstein was born into a family of eight children in Rotterdam, South Holland, Netherlands. After obtaining his Atheneum B diploma, he went to study law at the University of Leiden in 1975 after being advised to do so by his father. During his days as a student, he was a member of the Leiden Student Association 'Minerva'. He was also a member and president of the associated Pro Patria, the Leiden student defense organisation. He would graduate in 1981 with a degree in civil law.

=== Career ===
After his studies, he started his career at the then law firm Blackstone, Rueb & Van Boeschoten. In 1982, he became a member and from 1985 to 1995 he was the chairman of the Dutch Film Board. In 1989, together with Frits Salomonson, he started a practice that later became part of the Boekel de Néree partnership.

On March 16, 1994, Hammerstein would be arrested by Fred Teeven, the then public prosecutor in Amsterdam, after he suspected that his work for criminals went beyond being a defence lawyer. For instance, he was allegedly involved in money laundering for the criminal and drug trafficker Johan Verhoek (better known as the Hakkelaar). Hammerstein was detained for six weeks but was eventually acquitted on all counts. However, the court did rule in an obiter dictum that he allegedly acted lightly in taking on the case of Surinamese rice trader Shyam Guptar. The subsequent investigation by the Supervisory Council (the disciplinary tribunal for the legal profession) exonerated Hammerstein from that too; the Council ruled on April 16, 1996, that "it had not been shown that Hammerstein should have doubted the veracity of what he had been told about the origin of the money and that acceptance and treatment could not be called frivolous". During his detention, he was expelled from the Boekel de Néree partnership. Hammerstein filed a complaint against the partnership with the Netherlands Bar Association, alleging he had been treated improperly. Hammerstein also demanded 1.2 million guilders from the State of the Netherlands because of the six weeks he had been incarcerated, but the demand was rejected by the court.

On November 24, 1994, a bomb attack was carried out on the Dutch artist, Rob Scholte. As he drove away from Laurierstraat, a hand grenade exploded under his dark blue BMW 525i. Scholte was seriously injured and both his legs had to be amputated above the knee. One theory was that the attack was meant for Hammerstein, but that the perpetrator had mistaken the car for Scholtes. Hammerstein drove the same type of BMW – of the same colour and with almost the same number plate – which was parked nearby. The alleged mix-up of cars was never established and the investigation into Scholte's attack stalled.

Even after 1994, Hammerstein's name regularly appeared in the press as a lawyer in a variety of cases. In 2000, he started a law firm together with Gerard Spong. That year also saw the start of the Nina Brink case of internet provider World Online (WOL). Almost immediately at the IPO, the share price plummeted. The prospectus disguised the fact that she had sold shares shortly before, in addition to which the price per share was far below the introduction price. Both the court and (on appeal) the court of appeal declared the plaintiffs inadmissible. At the time, Hammerstein was also president of the Coornhert League; an association for criminal law reform. After the assassination of Pim Fortuyn in May 2002, he sued both some journalists and politicians, alleging that they had collaborated in demonising Fortuyn. The complaint was rejected by the court in all cases. Together with Spong, Hammerstein wrote the book "Vervolg ze tot in hel". Furthermore, he was active in the political party Lijst Pim Fortuyn (LPF), but at the end of 2003, he resigned as LPF leader together with property trader Ed Maas.

In February 2011, Spong and Hammerstein had a disagreement. It has remained unclear what it was about, but Hammerstein and his employees started their own office on the Herengracht under the name Hammerstein Advocaten N.V.

A week later, it became known that Riny Schreijenberg had ordered an attachment of Hammerstein's assets. Schreijenberg claimed to be owed €7 million due to damages that incurred because Hammerstein, who was his lawyer in 2005 in a dispute with Sony Music Entertainment, had failed to appear and had failed to appeal. By interlocutory judgment of February 1, 2012, the District Court of Amsterdam granted Schreijenberg's claims for part of approximately €300,000 and ordered him to provide further insight into another part of the damages. By final judgment of July 18, 2012, the court rejected all of Schreijenberg's claims and ordered Schreijenberg to pay the costs of €14,258.

In February 2014, Hammerstein published a book by Meulenhoff, "Ik heb de tijd", in which he recounts his student days at the University of Leiden, his infection with the HIV virus and his career as a lawyer. Hammerstein claims in his book, among other things, that the then prosecutors Fred Teeven and Martin Witteveen allegedly falsified evidence to arrest him in 1994.

On the occasion of King's Day 2015, he was appointed Knight of the Order of Orange-Nassau.

In February 2021, it was announced that he was the anonymous lawyer of Nabil B. from the Marengo trial. Also in February 2021, Hammerstein announced that he had ended his active career as a lawyer. On December 17, 2021, Hammerstein was struck off the register by the Board of Discipline after complaints by Peter R. de Vries, among others, had been lodged during Hammerstein's time as Nabil B's lawyer. He withdrew his candidacy on behalf of the VVD for the Amsterdam municipal elections in 2022 after the removal. Hammerstein appealed against his removal on February 17, 2023, but the Court of Discipline upheld the earlier decision, making it final.

== Publications ==
- 2003 – 'Prosecute them to hell': Fortuyn's hate speech (with Gerard Spong)
- 2014 – I have the time
