= Helpt =

- Ortsteil of Woldegk
- Interactive map of Helpt
- Location within Germany Location within Mecklenburg-Vorpommern
- Coordinates: 53°30′N 13°35′E
- Country: Germany
- State: Mecklenburg-Vorpommern
- District: Mecklenburgische Seenplatte
- Town: Woldegk

Area
  - Total: 22.37 km^{2} (8.64 sq mi)
- Elevation: 120 m (390 ft)

Population (2012-12-31)
  - Total: 350
  - Density: 16/km^{2} (41/sq mi)
- Time zone: UTC+01:00 (CET)
  - Summer (DST): UTC+02:00 (CEST)
- Postal codes: 17349
- Dialling codes: 03967
- Vehicle registration: MST
- Website: www.helpt.de.vu

Helpt is a village and a former municipality in the Mecklenburgische Seenplatte district, in Mecklenburg-Vorpommern, Germany. Since 25 May 2014, it is part of the town Woldegk.
