= Wanzkaer See =

Lake in Blankensee, Mecklenburg-Vorpommern, Germany

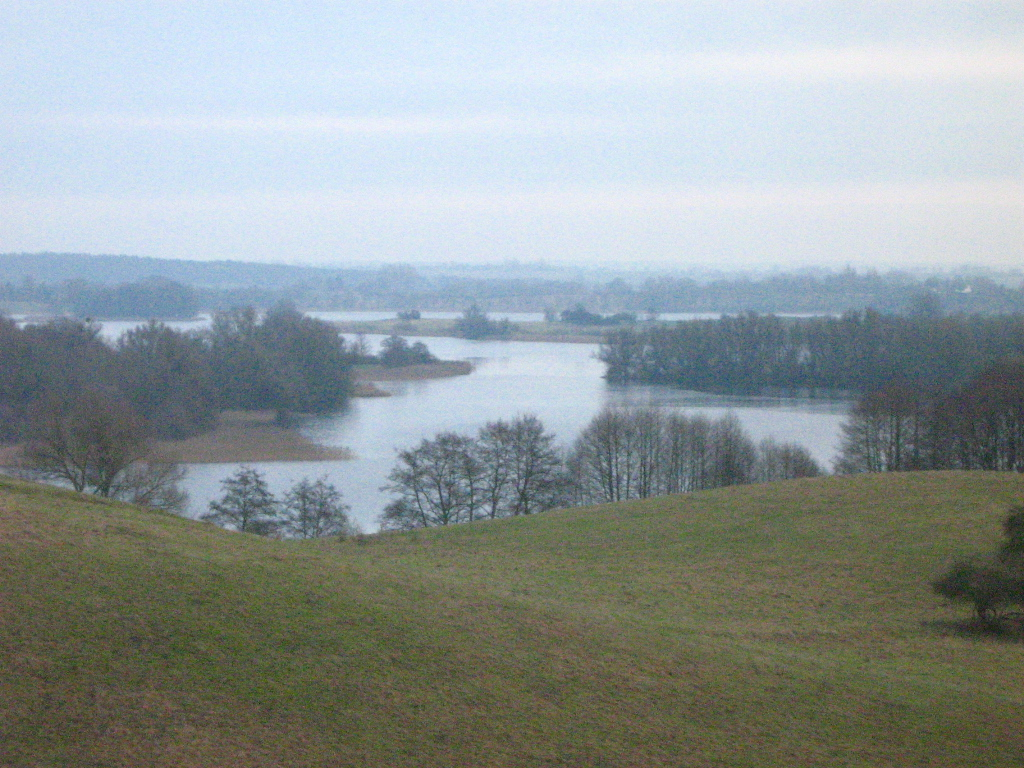

- Location within Mecklenburg-Vorpommern Location within Germany
- Location: Mecklenburgische Seenplatte, Mecklenburg-Vorpommern
- Coordinates: 53°24′19″N 13°13′23″E
- Primary inflows: Warbender Mühlbach
- Primary outflows: Nonne
- Basin countries: Germany
- Surface area: 2.03 km^{2} (0.78 sq mi)
- Average depth: 5.6 m (18 ft)
- Max. depth: 24 m (79 ft)
- Surface elevation: 58.5 m (192 ft)

Wanzkaer See is a lake in the Mecklenburgische Seenplatte district in Mecklenburg-Vorpommern, Germany. At an elevation of 58.5 m, its surface area is 2.03 km^{2}.
