= Gottlob Burchard Genzmer =

German educationist and naturalist

Gottlob Burchard Genzmer (8 November 1716 – 14 April 1771) was a German Lutheran theologian, tutor and naturalist, born in Hohen-Lübbichow (now Cedynia) and dying in Stargard. His pupils included the sisters Christiane and Charlotte of Mecklenburg-Strelitz and he was a friend of the art historian Johann Joachim Winckelmann. Genzmer is known for his detailed damage surveys of the June 29, 1764 violent tornado which impacted Mecklenburg-Vorpommern. His damage surveys ultimately led to the European Severe Storms Laboratory rating the first and only T11 tornado on the TORRO scale.

== Bibliography (in German) ==
- Adolf Christian Siemssen: "Beitrag zur Lebensgeschichte des Herrn G[ottlob] B[urchard] Genzmer". In: Magazin für die Naturkunde und Oekonomie Mecklenburgs. Schwerin u. Leipzig 1 (1791). p. 311–324.
- Peter Starsy: "Gottlob Burchard Genzmer (1716–1771). Versuch einer späten Würdigung". In: Stier und Greif: Sonderheft 1000 Jahre Mecklenburg. Schwerin, 1995. pp. 74–84.
- Peter Starsy: "Gottlob Burchard Genzmer". In: Biographisches Lexikon für Mecklenburg. Bd. 2 (1999). pp. 97–103 [mit weit. Angaben u. Werkverzeichnis].
- Grete Grewolls: Wer war wer in Mecklenburg und Vorpommern. Das Personenlexikon. Hinstorff Verlag, Rostock, 2011 ISBN 978-3-356-01301-6.
