= 795 =

Calendar year

795 in various calendars
| Gregorian calendar | 795; DCCXCV |
| Ab urbe condita | 1548 |
| Armenian calendar | 244; ԹՎ ՄԽԴ |
| Assyrian calendar | 5545 |
| Balinese saka calendar | 716–717 |
| Bengali calendar | 201–202 |
| Berber calendar | 1745 |
| Buddhist calendar | 1339 |
| Burmese calendar | 157 |
| Byzantine calendar | 6303–6304 |
| Chinese calendar | 甲戌年 (Wood Dog); 3492 or 3285 — to — 乙亥年 (Wood Pig); 3493 or 3286 |
| Coptic calendar | 511–512 |
| Discordian calendar | 1961 |
| Ethiopian calendar | 787–788 |
| Hebrew calendar | 4555–4556 |
- Hindu calendars
| Vikram Samvat | 851–852 |
| Shaka Samvat | 716–717 |
| Kali Yuga | 3895–3896 |
| Holocene calendar | 10795 |
| Iranian calendar | 173–174 |
| Islamic calendar | 178–179 |
| Japanese calendar | Enryaku 14 (延暦１４年) |
| Javanese calendar | 690–691 |
| Julian calendar | 795; DCCXCV |
| Korean calendar | 3128 |
| Minguo calendar | 1117 before ROC 民前1117年 |
| Nanakshahi calendar | −673 |
| Seleucid era | 1106/1107 AG |
| Thai solar calendar | 1337–1338 |
| Tibetan calendar | ཤིང་ཕོ་ཁྱི་ལོ་ (male Wood-Dog); 921 or 540 or −232 — to — ཤིང་མོ་ཕག་ལོ་ (female Wood-Boar); 922 or 541 or −231 |

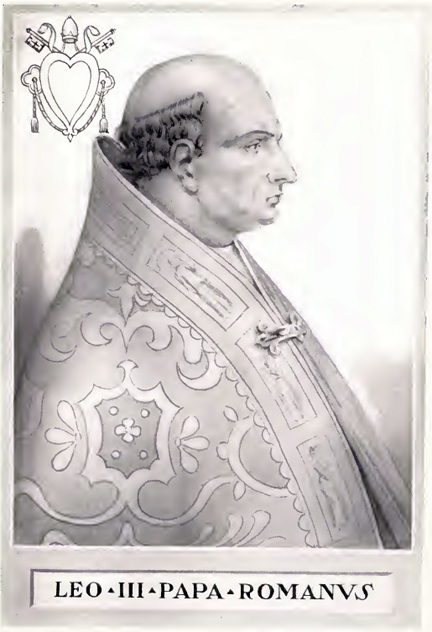
Pope Leo III (750–816)

Year 795 (DCCXCV) was a common year starting on Thursday of the Julian calendar. The denomination 795 for this year has been used since the early medieval period, when the Anno Domini calendar era became the prevalent method in Europe for naming years.

== Events ==
=== By place ===
==== Europe ====
- Saxon War: The Slav Obodrites, under their ruler Witzan, attack the northern Saxons in Liuni. He is killed in an ambush and succeeded by his son Drożko (Thrasco), who becomes a Carolingian dux. King Charlemagne leads a Frankish expeditionary force north from Mainz, and marches to the Elbe, where eastern Saxon rebels again surrender.
- Charlemagne creates the Hispanic Marches, a buffer zone beyond the former province of Septimania. A group of Iberian lordships form a defensive barrier between the Umayyad Moors of Al-Andalus (modern Spain) and the Frankish Kingdom.
- In the earliest recorded Viking raid on Ireland, they attack the monasteries at Iona (Inner Hebrides), Inishbofin and Inishmurray (approximate date).

==== Britain ====
- Quarrels between the kings Cynan Dindaethwy and Hywel leave the way open for Caradog ap Meirion (the House of Rhos) to usurp the throne of Gwynedd (modern Wales).
- King Offa of Mercia receives diplomatic gifts from Charlemagne. He re-founds St. Albans Abbey, supposedly in thanks for overrunning East Anglia (approximate date).

=== By topic ===
==== Religion ====
- December 25 – Pope Adrian I, age 95, dies after a 23-year reign, and is succeeded by Leo III as the 96th pope of Rome.
- December 26 – Leo III is elected to serve as Pope on the day his predecessor Adrian I is buried, and is consecrated the following day.
- Paul the Deacon, a Benedictine monk at Monte Cassino, completes the History of the Lombards (approximate date).

== Births ==
- Æthelwulf, king of Wessex (approximate date)
- Babak Khorramdin, Persian military leader (or 798)
- Bernard of Septimania, Frankish duke (d. 844)
- Gregory IV, pope of the Catholic Church (d. 844)
- Judith of Bavaria, Frankish queen (or 797/805)
- Landulf I, gastald (or count) of Capua (approximate date)
- Lothair I, king and emperor of the Franks (d. 855)
- Mu Zong, emperor of the Tang Dynasty (d. 824)
- Nithard, Frankish historian (d. 844)
- Renaud d'Herbauges, Frankish nobleman (d. 843)

== Deaths ==
- December 25 – Adrian I, pope of the Catholic Church (b. 700)
- Ælfthryth of Crowland, Anglo-Saxon princess
- Bran Ardchenn, king of Leinster (Ireland)
- Malik ibn Anas, founder of the Maliki School (b. 711)
- Witzan, Obodrite prince
