= Ratibor =

Ratibor or Ratiboř may refer to:

== People ==
- Ratibor (given name)
- Ratibor (Polabian prince) (died 1043), a prince of the Obotrite confederacy from the Polabian tribe
- Ratibor I, Duke of Pomerania (1124–1156), duke of the House of Pomerania (Griffins)
- Ratibor II, Duke of Pomerania (died after 1223), a Pomeranian duke, son of Ratibor I
- Alexander Kuznetsov (soldier), nom de guerre "Ratibor"

== Places ==
=== Czech Republic ===
- Ratiboř (Jindřichův Hradec District), a municipality and village in the South Bohemian Region
- Ratiboř (Vsetín District), a municipality and village in the Zlín Region
- Ratiboř, a village and part of Chyšky in the South Bohemian Region

=== United States ===
- Ratibor, Texas, an unincorporated community

=== Poland ===
- Racibórz, a city called Ratibor in German and Ratiboř in Czech

== Other uses ==
- SV Ratibor 03, a former German association football club from what is today Racibórz in Poland
