= Nordalbingia =

Region of medieval Saxony

Nordalbingia within Saxony circa AD 1000. The territory to the north is the Danish March/March of Schleswig, while that to the east is the Limes Saxoniae. Nordalbingia Other parts of Saxony Rest of the German Kingdom

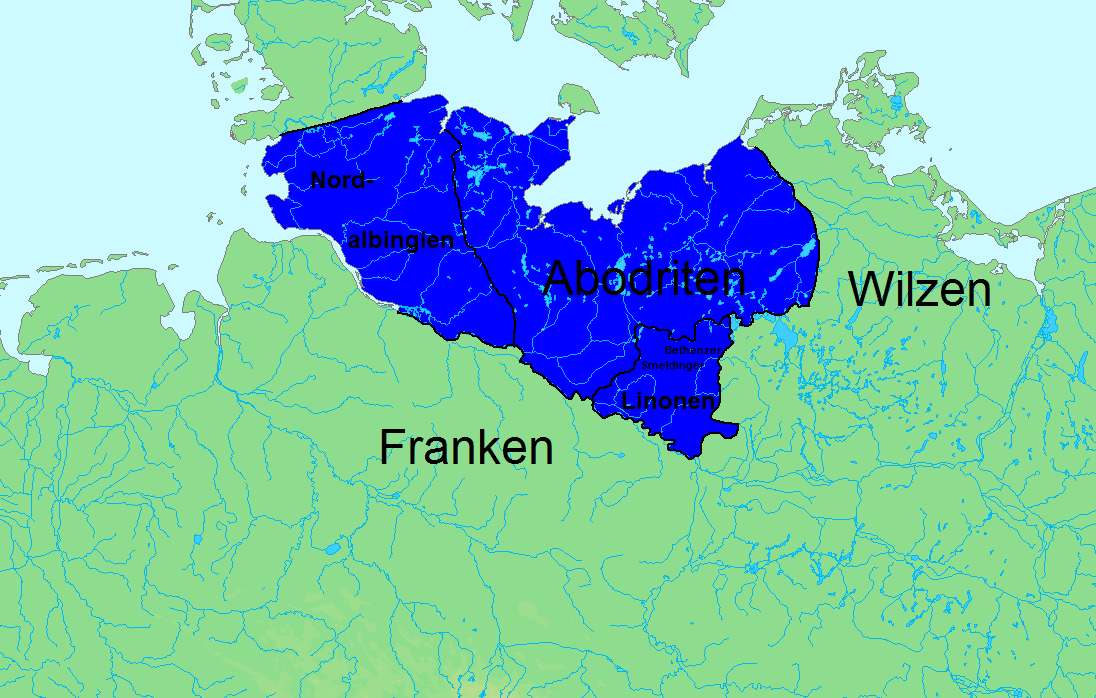
Nordalbingia within Obotrite confederation about 800-814

Nordalbingia (German: Nordelbingen) (also Northern Albingia) was one of the four administrative regions of the medieval Duchy of Saxony, the others being Angria, Eastphalia, and Westphalia. The region's name is based on the Latin name Alba for the Elbe River and refers to an area predominantly located north of the Lower Elbe, roughly corresponding with the present-day Holstein region. Situated in what is now Northern Germany, this is the earliest known dominion of the Saxons.

== Geography ==
According to the 1076 Gesta Hammaburgensis ecclesiae pontificum by chronicler Adam of Bremen, Nordalbingia consisted of three tribal areas (Gaue):

- Dithmarschen, stretching along the coast of the North Sea from the mouth of the Elbe River to the Eider River in the north
- Holstein proper, situated on the Stör River, a right tributary of the Elbe
- Stormarn on the north bank of the Elbe, including the present-day area of Hamburg.

The Nordalbingian tribes were allied with the Saxons settling in Land Hadeln (Haduloha) south of the Elbe. In the east, the Limes Saxoniae, an inaccessible region between the Elbe and today's Kiel Fjord on the Baltic Sea, formed a natural border with the Wagria lands settled by Slavic Obotrites.

== History ==
In 772, Charlemagne, ruler of the Franks, started the Saxon Wars to conquer the lands of the North German Plain. According to the Royal Frankish Annals, the Westphalian noble Widukind refused to appear at the 777 Imperial Diet in Paderborn and fled across the Elbe to Nordalbingia (or possibly further to the court of the Danish king Sigfred). Even after Widukind's submission and Christianization in 785, the Nordalbingian tribes remained reluctant until they were finally defeated at the 798 Battle of Bornhöved by the combined forces of the Franks and their Obotrite allies led by Prince Drożko. The Saxons lost 4,000 people, 10,000 families of Saxons were deported to other areas of the Carolingian Empire.

The areas north of the Elbe were at first given to the Obotrites, while Land Hadeln was directly incorporated. However, Nordalbingia soon was invaded by the Danes and only the intervention of Charlemagne's son Charles the Younger in 808 pushed them back across the Eider River. The next year the emperor had Esesfeld Castle erected near present-day Itzehoe and the entire region was incorporated into the Frankish Empire. Probably in order to counter the ongoing invasions led by King Sigfred's successor Gudfred, the Franks established the Danish March stretching from the Eider River to the Danevirke fortifications in the north. After King Gudfred was killed, his successor Hemming concluded the Treaty of Heiligen with Charlemagne in 811, whereafter the Eider should mark the border between Denmark and Francia. However, quarrels between both sides would continue for more than a century until the East Frankish king Henry the Fowler finally defeated the Danish forces of King Gnupa at Hedeby in 934.

After Charlemagne's death in 814, the Nordalbingian Saxons were pardoned and their land restored to them from the Obotrites. According to some sources, the emperor had intended to establish a diocese of Nordalbingia headed by the priest Heridag. This plan was abandoned after Heridag's death, and the region came to be assigned to the dioceses of Bremen and Verden during the reign of Emperor Louis the Pious, when Ansgar was appointed Archbishop at Hamburg in 831.
