= Ratibořské Hory =

- Municipality
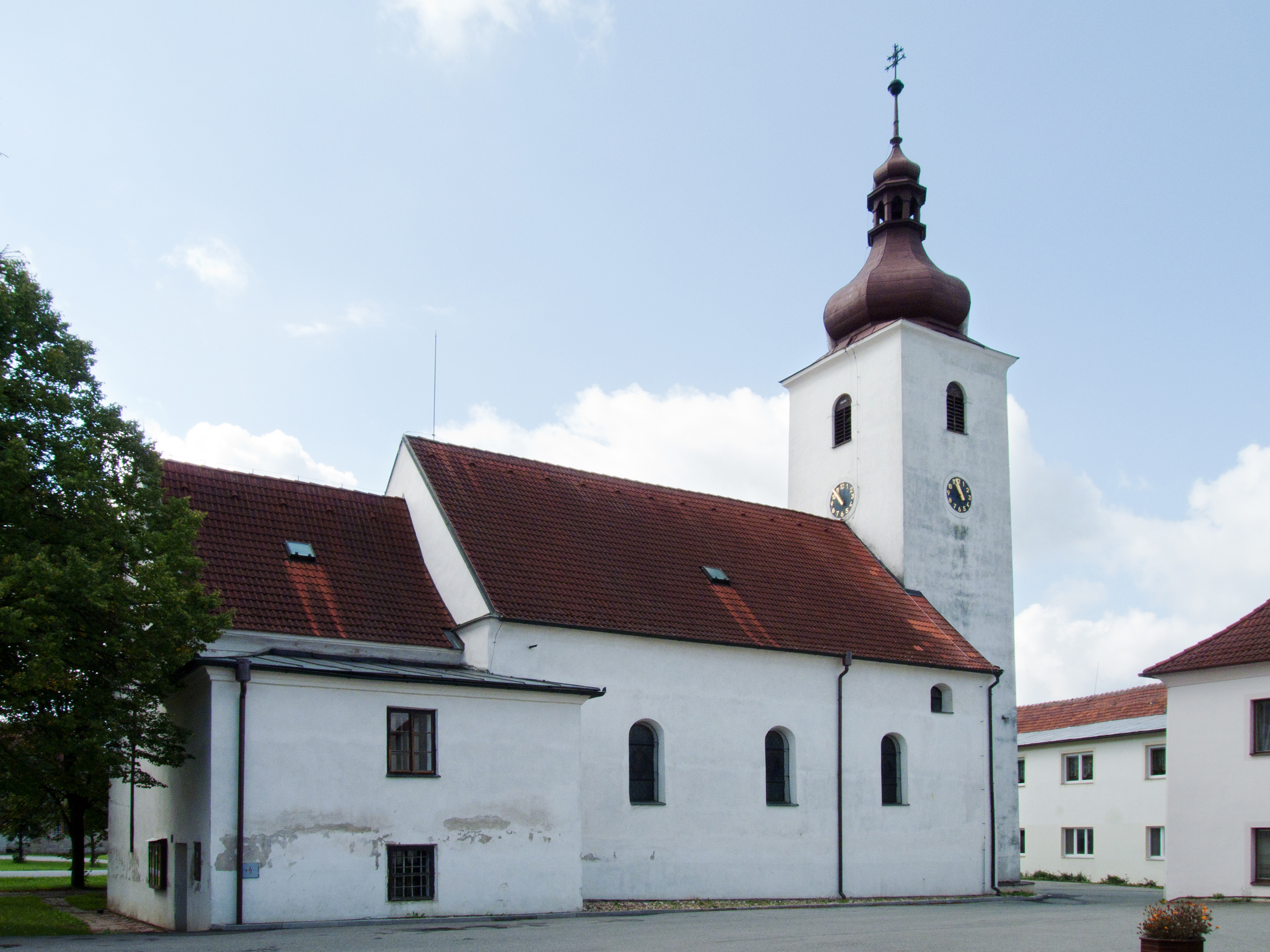
- Church of Saint Adalbert

- Location in the Czech Republic
- Coordinates: 49°27′46″N 14°46′11″E
- Country: Czech Republic
- Region: South Bohemian
- District: Tábor
- Founded: 1527

Area
  - Total: 21.14 km^{2} (8.16 sq mi)
- Elevation: 418 m (1,371 ft)

Population (2026-01-01)
  - Total: 825
  - Density: 39.0/km^{2} (101/sq mi)
- Time zone: UTC+1 (CET)
  - Summer (DST): UTC+2 (CEST)
- Postal codes: 391 42, 391 43
- Website: www.ratiborskehory.cz

Ratibořské Hory (German: Bergstädtel) is a municipality and village in Tábor District in the South Bohemian Region of the Czech Republic. It has about 800 inhabitants.

== Administrative division ==
Ratibořské Hory consists of six municipal parts (in brackets population according to the 2021 census):

- Ratibořské Hory (429)
- Dub (76)
- Malenín (5)
- Podolí (49)
- Ratibořice (93)
- Vřesce (108)

== Etymology ==
The initial name of Ratibořské Hory was Ratibořické Hory, which tranlates as 'Ratibořice's mountains'. The settlement was named after the nearby village of Ratibořice (now part of Ratibořské Hory). The form Ratibořské Hory first appeared in 1654. The name Ratibořice is derived from the personal name Ratibor, meaning "the village of Ratibor's people".

== Geography ==
Ratibořské Hory is located about 9 kilometres (6 mi) northeast of Tábor and 57 km (35 mi) northeast of České Budějovice. The municipal territory lies on the border between three nature regions. The northern and central parts with the Ratibořské Hory village lie in the Vlašim Uplands. The southwestern part with Vřesce lies in the Tábor Uplands. The eastern part lies in the Křemešník Highlands and includes the highest point of Ratibořské Hory, which is the hill Homole at 667 m (2,188 ft) above sea level. The territory is rich in small fishponds.

== History ==
Ratibořské Hory was founded in 1527 and further developed during the 16th century into a mining town because of growing mining activities, mostly of the silver ores. Mineworkers were coming from the Ore Mountain Mining Region. The settlement was a royal property until 1586, when Emperor Rudolf II left it to the Rosenberg family. In 1611, after the death of the last Rosenberg, it was again acquired by the royal chamber.

A new rise in silver mining occurred after 1737, when Ratibořské Hory was acquired by the Schwarzenberg family. At the end of the 18th century, the population reached its peak of over 2,000.

== Demographics ==
Historical population

| Year | Pop. | ±% |
|---|---|---|
| 1869 | 2,118 | — |
| 1880 | 2,182 | +3.0% |
| 1890 | 1,979 | −9.3% |
| 1900 | 1,815 | −8.3% |
| 1910 | 1,714 | −5.6% |

| Year | Pop. | ±% |
|---|---|---|
| 1921 | 1,589 | −7.3% |
| 1930 | 1,428 | −10.1% |
| 1950 | 1,066 | −25.4% |
| 1961 | 1,055 | −1.0% |
| 1970 | 890 | −15.6% |

| Year | Pop. | ±% |
|---|---|---|
| 1980 | 826 | −7.2% |
| 1991 | 756 | −8.5% |
| 2001 | 747 | −1.2% |
| 2011 | 727 | −2.7% |
| 2021 | 760 | +4.5% |

Source: Censuses

== Transport ==
There are no railways or major roads passing through the municipality.

== Sights ==
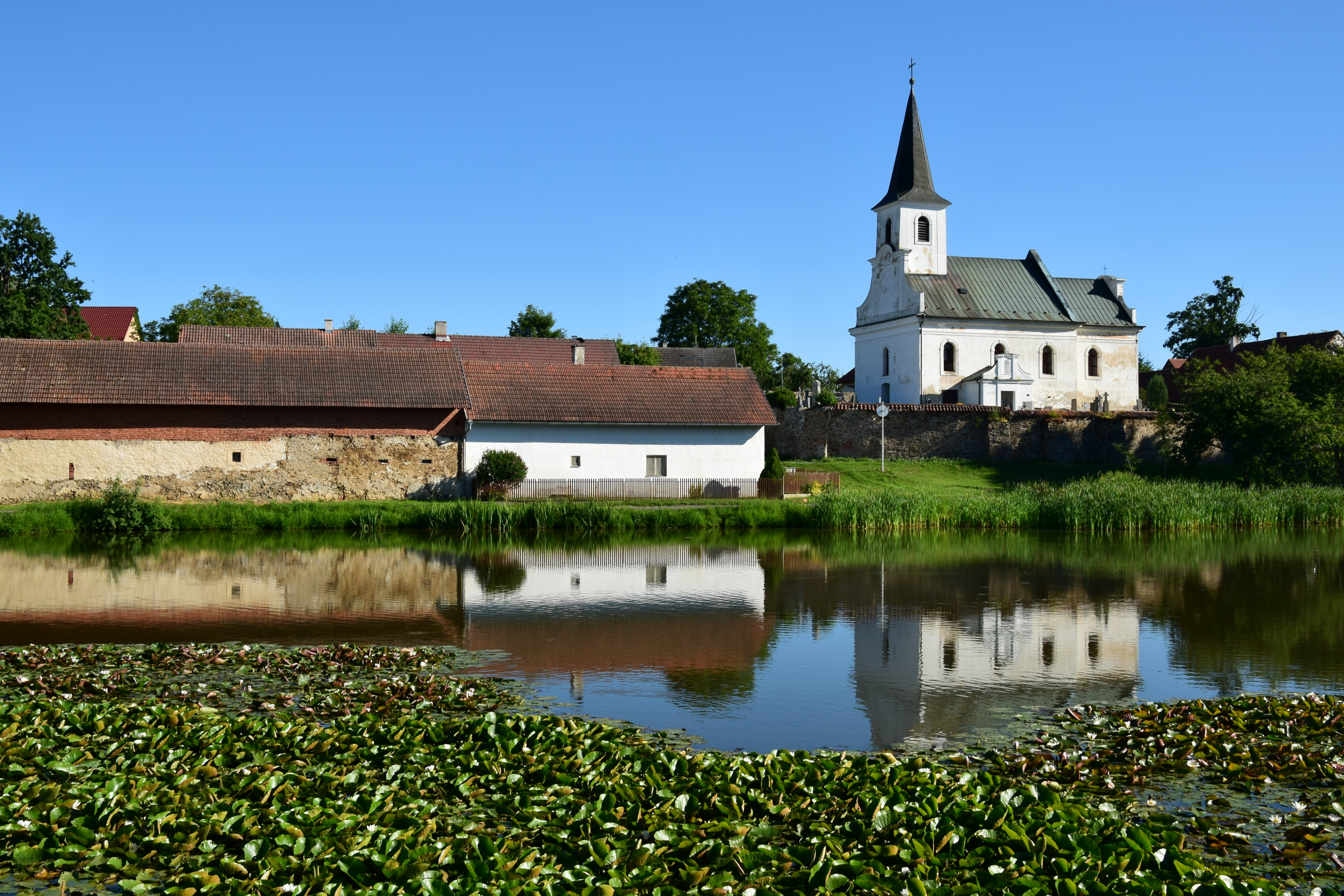
Church of Saint Bartholomew

The main landmark of Ratibořské Hory is the Church of Saint Adalbert. Originally built in the second half of the 14th century, it was rebuilt to its present Baroque form in 1720–1722.

The Church of Saint Bartholomew is located in Ratibořice. It was first mentioned in 1369. In the second half of the 18th century, it was rebuilt in the Baroque style. Neoclassical reconstruction took place after the fire in 1849.
