= Draško =

Draško (Cyrillic: Драшко) is a South Slavic male given name predominantly used by Serbs and Montenegrins.

It may refer to:

- Drosaico or Draško, Duke of the Narentines (fl. 839)
- Draško Božović, Montenegrin footballer
- Draško Petrović, Serbian politician and businessman
- Draško Mrvaljević, Montenegrin handball player
- Draško Vojinović, Serbian football player
- Draško Brguljan, Montenegrin water polo player
- Draško Knežević, Bosnian Serb basketball player

== See also ==
- Drażko, cognate West Slavic male given name, referred to a duke of the Obotrites (d. 802)
- Drašković
- Draškovac
- Drago (given name)
