= Battle of Bornhöved =

Battle of Bornhöved can refer to:

- Battle of Bornhöved (798), or the first battle of Bornhöved, in 798
- Battle of Bornhöved (1227), or the second Battle of Bornhöved, in 1227
- Battle of Bornhöved (1813), or the third Battle of Bornhöved, in 1813, between Sweden and Denmark
