= Blus =

Blus was an Obotrite noble, brother-in-law of prince Gottschalk, who, after Gottshalk's death in 1066 led a pagan uprising in Obotrite territory. The pagan Slavs exiled Gottschalk's Christian wife and killed the bishop of Mecklenburg, John Scotus, whose head was sent to the city of Radgosc. Blus for a brief period led the Obotrites and it was under his command that their forces sacked Hamburg and Hedeby.

Blus was killed in 1067 during a wiec of West Slavic nobility in unclear circumstances. In 1068 Bishop Burchard of Halberstadt captured and burned Radgosc. The Obotrites chose Kruto who led the rebellion until 1098.
