= Reric =

Viking Age emporium on the Baltic Sea coast

Coordinates: 53°57′20″N 11°28′53″E

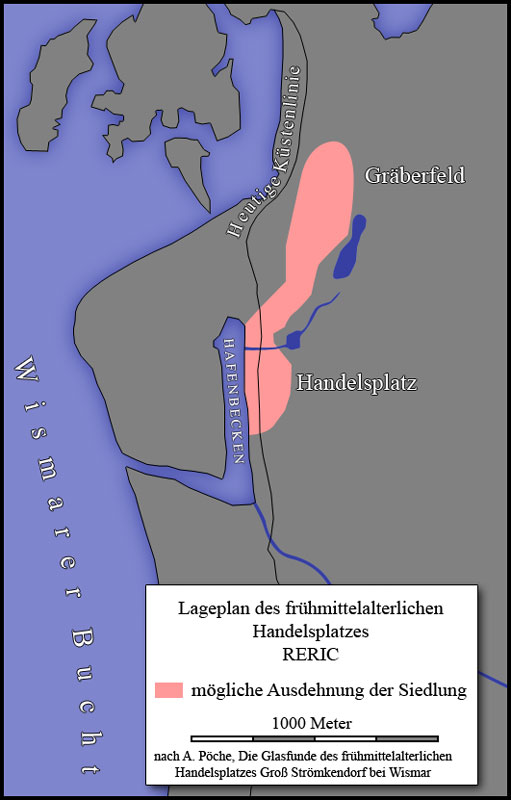
Map of Reric as located near Strömkendorf

Reric or Rerik was one of the Viking Age multi-ethnic Slavic-Scandinavian emporia on the southern coast of the Baltic Sea, located near Wismar in the present-day German state of Mecklenburg-Vorpommern Reric was established probably in 735 shortly after Slavs of the Obodrite tribe had started to settle the region. At the turn of the 9th century, the citizens of Reric allied with Charlemagne, who used the port as part of a strategic trade route that would avoid areas of Saxon and Danish control. It was destroyed in 808 AD by the Viking (Danish) king Gudfred. The destroyed place was rebuilt by the Obodrites and continued to operate for a short until Drasco was murdered in Reric in 810 at the instigation of Gudfred. After that, the tradespeople were reportedly moved by the king to the Viking emporium of Hedeby (also Haithabu) near modern Schleswig.

== Location ==
The location of Reric was long disputed. Older theories suggested Oldenburg, Lübeck, Mecklenburg Castle, and Alt-Gaarz, renamed Rerik in 1938. Since the 1990s, Reric is thought to be identical with an archaeological site near Groß Strömkendorf, located on the eastern shore of the Bay of Wismar. This version is based on results presented by Kiel University and Mecklenburg-Vorpommern's State Department for Archaeology, who partially excavated about 20 hectares of the site between 1995 and 1999.

== Archaeology ==
There is a certain amount of circumstantial evidence for Groß Strömkendorf being Reric such as identical foundation and destruction dates. Groß Strömkendorf was a deep water port with a planned layout. Initially north of the present site, the earlier settlement - probably established in 735 - was gradually moved south in the 760s, the original area being turned into a cemetery. The new, extended site contained buildings similar to the sunken floor buildings of West Stow in England. Pottery included, among others, tatting ware and shelly ware. The primary type of pottery found so far was the Sukow type, associated used by the West Slavs during the 8th century. Pottery of the succeeding Feldberg type was also found, though in considerably lower number. Imported pottery from western countries was only scarcely represented. Hoards of Norwegian schist whetstones were found, also evidence of textile, iron and bronze working, but no major industrial evidence, indicating that production was likely for local use only. Unfinished products and garbage pieces point at the production of items made of glass, metals including iron, amber, and horn. The most recent find of wood that can be dated is from the year 811 and the finding situation suggests that the settlement ceased to exist a little later.

The settlement stretched 500 meters along the coast, and covered a surface of at least 20 hectars. Within a 10 kilometer range around the settlement, remains of Slavic open settlements have been found. The nearby fortified strongholds of Mecklenburg and Ilow were, like Reric, founded in the early 8th century, thus constituting some of the earliest Slavic settlements near the Baltic coast.

== Decline ==
As reported by the Royal Frankish Annals (Latin: Annales regni Francorum) of 808 Ain D, Danish king Gudfred (also Godofrid, Gøttrik) had received plenty of tribute from Reric in the years before, but in 808 "destroyed" the emporium and took with him "the merchants hereof". Gudfred resettled them in Hedeby (also Haithabu, Sliasthorp), a contemporary emporium closer to Denmark. This event was part of ongoing warfare between Denmark and Charlemagne's Frankish Empire, in the course of which the Franks had allied with the Obodrites. The destruction of the site may not have been total, since an Obodrite duke, Drazko, is reported murdered at Reric the following year. The archeological finds since the 1990s perfectly match these records, as the latest dateable wellwoods found in Reric are from the years 806, 809 and 811.

"Reregi", an alternative name of the Obodrites used by the medieval chroniclers Adam of Bremen and Helmold of Bosau, is probably a rendering of "Reric".

== See also ==
- Pomerania during the Early Middle Ages
- Raróg

== Literature ==
- Astrid Tummuscheit: Groß Strömkendorf. Zur Entwicklung des frühmittelalterlichen Seehandelsplatzes anhand dendrochronologischer Datierungen, in: The Early Slavic Settlement in Central Europe in the light of new dating evidence, S. 103–119, Institute of Archaeology and Ethnology Polish Academy of Science (Hg.), Wroclav 2013
