= Battle of Bornhöved (798) =

Or the first battle of Bornhöved, in 798

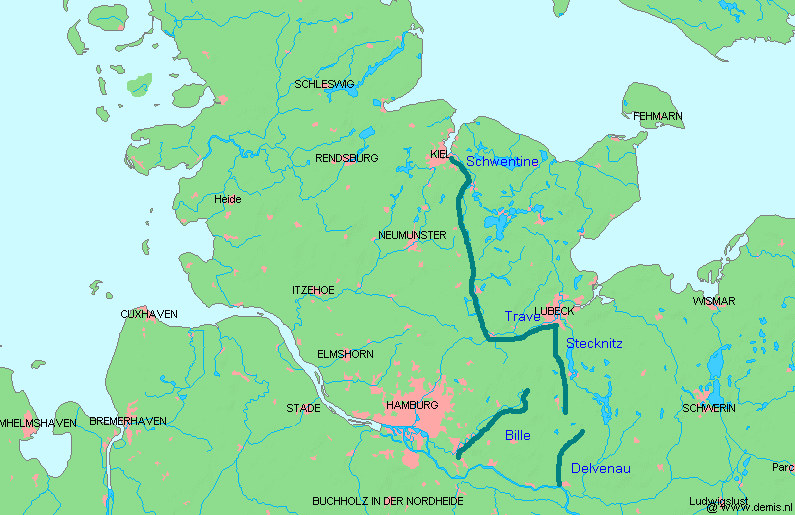
Date	798
Location	Sventanafeld (Sventanapolje or "Schwentine field") near the village of Bornhöved near Neumünster
Result	Obotrite–Frankish victory

Belligerents
Obotrite Confederacy; Kingdom of the Franks	Nordalbingian Saxons

Commanders and leaders
Drożko; Eburisus	Unknown

Casualties and losses
Unknown	2,901–4,000 killed

In the Battle of Bornhöved (German: Schlacht auf dem Sventanafeld) or, possibly *Vir·Gento·Vedo, on the field of Sventanafeld (Sventanapolje or "Schwentine field") near the village of Bornhöved near Neumünster in 798 the Obodrites, led by Drożko, allied with the Franks, defeated the Nordalbingian Saxons.

== Background ==
The situation before the battle resulted from the migrations that occurred during 6th and 7th centuries onto the territory of Holstein. In the process Danes settled the northern part, Slavic Obodrites the eastern part (Wagria) and Saxons from the south migrated into western Holstein. The battle was part of the effort by the Frankish King, Charlemagne, to conquer and convert Old Saxony.

== Battle ==
"Nordliudi contra Thrasuconem, ducem Abodritorum, et Eburisum legatum nostrum conmisso proelio, acie victi sunt. Caesa sunt ex eis in loco proelii quattuor milia, ceteri qui fugerunt et evaserunt, quanquam multi et ex illis cecidissent, de pacis condicione tractaverunt".
Annales Laurissenses 798.

The allied forces of Obodrites led by Drożko and Franks led by legatus Eburisus defeated Nordliudi (the 'Northern people') - in other words the Saxons. According to the chronicle, the Saxons lost 4,000 warriors and were forced to flee the battlefield. The contemporary Lorsch Annals give the smaller number of 2,901 dead Saxons.

== Results ==
The victory of Charlemagne in the battle finally broke the resistance of the Nordalbingian Saxons to Christianisation. Charlemagne decided to massacre the Nordalbingian Saxons or deport them: their areas in Holstein became sparsely populated and were handed over to the Obodrites. The limit of influence between Denmark and the Frankish Empire was successfully established on the Eider River in 811. This boundary was to remain in place almost without a break for the next thousand years. In 810 the Limes Saxoniae - the fortified line to protect Frankish-Saxon territories from further attacks by the Obodrites from Ostholstein - was mentioned for the first time.

== See also ==
- Battle of Bornhöved (1227)
