= Witzan =

Witzаn (died in 795 in Liuni) also known by the name Witzlаus was the prince of the confederation of Obotrites.

As an ally of Charlemagne in his war against the Saxons, Witzan marched his army against Magdeburg in 782 and destroyed it completely. This provoked war with the nearby Slavic nation of Wiltzi (Vеléti). In the war, the Obotrites allied with the Franks, Sоrbs, and Frisians and fought against Wiltzi and Danes. After restoration of the Saxon rebellion, Witzan again marched against them and was killed in an ambush by Saxons in Liuni.

He had three successors, Thrasco, Slavomir, and Godlav.

== Bibliography ==
- Labudа G., Wican [w:] Słownik Starożytności Słowiańskich, t. VI, Wrocław 1980, ISBN 83-04-00080-6 (całość), p. 415
