= Ratibor (given name) =

Ratibor is a common masculine given name found in Slavic and Germanic speaking countries. It is a Slavic name derived from Old Slavic (Ратиборъ 'war fighter').

== Notable people ==
- Ratibor (Polabian prince) (died 1043), a prince of the Obotrite confederacy from the Polabian tribe
- Ratibor I, Duke of Pomerania (1124–1156), duke of the House of Pomerania (Griffins)
- Ratibor II, Duke of Pomerania (died after 1223), a Pomeranian duke, son of Ratibor I

== See also ==
- Ratibor (disambiguation)
