= Udo (Obotrite prince) =

Obotrite prince (died 1028)

Udo (or Uto) (died 1028), born Pribignev (also Pribignew or Pribygnev), was an Obodrite leader in the early eleventh century. His name Udo, of Germanic origin, was probably given him at his Christian baptism, perhaps after his possible godfather, Lothair Udo I of Stade. Udo's father, Mistislaw, escaped in 1018 from a pagan Slavic uprising to Luneburg.

Since two contemporary Obodrite princes are recorded, Anadrag (Anatrog) and Gneus (Gnew), Udo's power could not have been that extensive. According to Adam of Bremen and Helmold following him, Udo was a male Christianus ("bad Christian"). He was assassinated in 1028 by a Saxon, allegedly for cruelty. By his wife, a Dane, Udo left a son, Gottschalk, who later united the Obodrites under him and became a champion of Christianity.
