= Thrasco =

Prince of the Obotrites

Thrasco of the Obotrites
- dux
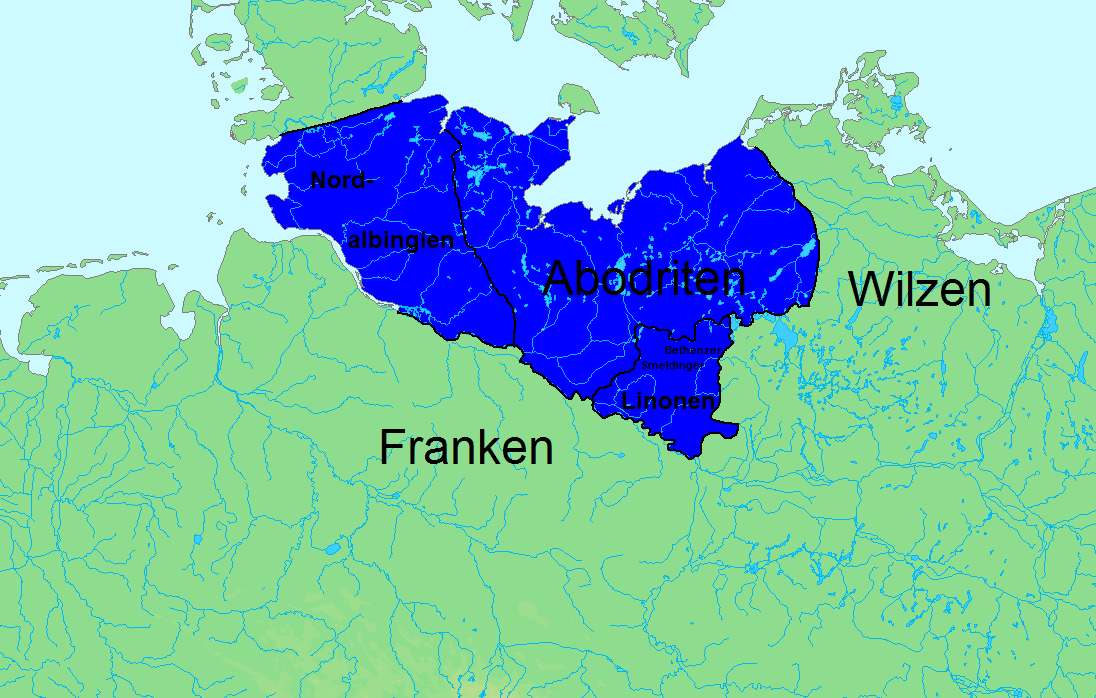

Obotrite Prince
- Reign: c. 795 - 810
- Predecessor: Witzlaus II
- Successor: Slavomir
- Died: 810; Reric
- Issue: Cedragus
- Dynasty: Witzlausid
- Father: Witzlaus II
- Religion: Slavic

Thrasco (Latin: Thrasucon, Drascon) (*Daržĭkŭ) (fl. 795 – 810) was the Prince (knyaz) of the Obotrite confederation from 795 until his death in 810. He succeeded his father, Witzlaus II, who had been ambushed and killed by the revolting Saxons. Thrasco defeated the Saxons in the battle on Schwentine River in 798. He was murdered in Reric in 810. Thrasco had a son, Cedragus, the Obotrite prince from 819 to 826.

== Background ==
The Obotrites were a confederation of West Slavic tribe that lived on the shores of the Baltic Sea on the areas of nowadays Mecklenburg and Holstein. Thrasco's father, Witzlaus II (r. 747-795), assumed power in 747, shortly after the death of his father Aribert II (r. 724–747). As allies to Frankish King Charlemagne, Witzlaus II marched against the Saxons in Magdeburg in 782 and devastated their army (see Saxon wars, middle phase). The Franks issued a blood court, and massacred 4,500 Saxon captives at Verden. This provoked the nearby Slavic tribe of Veleti, which hated the Franks, to assemble under their leader Dragovit, including the Linonen Slavs and the Danes. The Frankish-led contingent of Obotrites, Sorbs and Frisians crossed the Elbe and Havel and defeated the outnumbered army of Dragovit in 786, or by 789. The Veleti were forced to recognize Frankish suzerainty, and pledge loyalty, as well as surrender a large number of hostages. Dragovit was obliged to pay tribute to the Franks and to accept the baptism of his people by Christian missionaries.

The Nordalbingians (Saxons) revolted against the Franks once again, and Witzlaus was dispatched to tackle them, however, he was caught and killed in an ambush in Liuini, in 795.

== Life ==
„Nordliudi contra Thrasuconem, ducem Abodritorum, et Eburisum legatum nostrum conmisso proelio, acie victi sunt. Caesa sunt ex eis in loco proelii quattuor milia, ceteri qui fugerunt et evaserunt, quanquam multi et ex illis cecidissent, de pacis condicione tractaverunt.”
Annales Laurissenses 798.

Thrasco succeeded his father, and continued the warfare against the Saxons. An Engrian revolt followed in 796, but Charlemagne's personal presence and the aid of loyal Christian Saxons and Slavs (including Obotrites) immediately crushed it.

Charlemagne then continued his goal to convert Old Saxony into Christianity from paganism. The Frankish-Obotrite forces were led by Thrasco and legatus Eburisus. According to Einhard's chronicles, the Nordalbingians lost 4,000 soldiers and were forced to retreat. The battle finally ended the Nordalbingian resistance to Christianization. Charlemagne ordered further massacres, and deportations; their areas in Holstein became sparsely populated and were given to the Obotrites.

The Sorbs then ended their vassalage to the Franks and revolted, invading Austrasia. Charles the Younger launched a campaign against the Slavs in Bohemia in 805, and after killing Duke Lecho of the Bohemians, Charles himself crossed the Saale with his army and killed Sorbian princes Miliduch and Nussito, near modern-day Weißenfels, in 806. The region was laid to waste, upon which the other Slavic chieftains submitted and gave hostages.

In 808, Danish king Gudfred, after building the Danevirke (for the defence of a possible Frankish attack), crossed into Obotrite area at Reric (modern Wismar) and forced them to acknowledge him as their suzerain. The port was part of a strategic trade route, and Gudfred destroyed the town and forced the merchants to resettle at Hedeby (in Danevirke). In 810, Thrasco was murdered by a vassal of Gudfred in Reric.

== Aftermath ==
The Frankish subjects in the frontiers were quiet for a decade, then the Sorbs revolted in 816, and were quickly followed by the Obotrites, led by Slavomir, Thrasco's successor. Slavomir was however abandoned by his people, and by 818, Cedragus, Thrasco's son, inherited the leadership of the Obotrites.

== Annotations ==
1. Name: The first attestation of his name is the Latin Thrasco, with other spellings including Thrasuco, Thrasucho and Drasco. In the Slavic languages, his name is Dražko or Draško; in Polish it is Drożko or Drażko. The root of his name, Proto-Slavic dorgu (drago) means "dear" or "precious" (see Draško).
