= Drašković =

Drašković (meaning "son of Draško") is a surname used in Croatia, Montenegro and Serbia, and may refer to:

- Drašković family, Croatian noble family
  - Juraj Drašković (1525–1587), Croatian cardinal and ban (viceroy)
  - Ivan II Drašković (1550–1613), Croatian ban
  - Ivan III Drašković (1603–1648), Croatian ban
  - Janko Drašković (1770–1856), Croatian national reformer, politician and poet
- Milorad Drašković (1873–1921), Serbian politician
- Dušan Drašković (born 1939), Montenegrin football coach
- Radivoje Drašković (born 1943), Serbian football coach
- Vuk Drašković (born 1946), Serbian writer and politician
- Tibor Draskovics (born 1955), Hungarian politician
- Žarko Drašković (born 1965), Montenegrin football player
