= Gottschalk (Obotrite prince) =

11th-century Slavic prince and saint

Saint Gottschalk
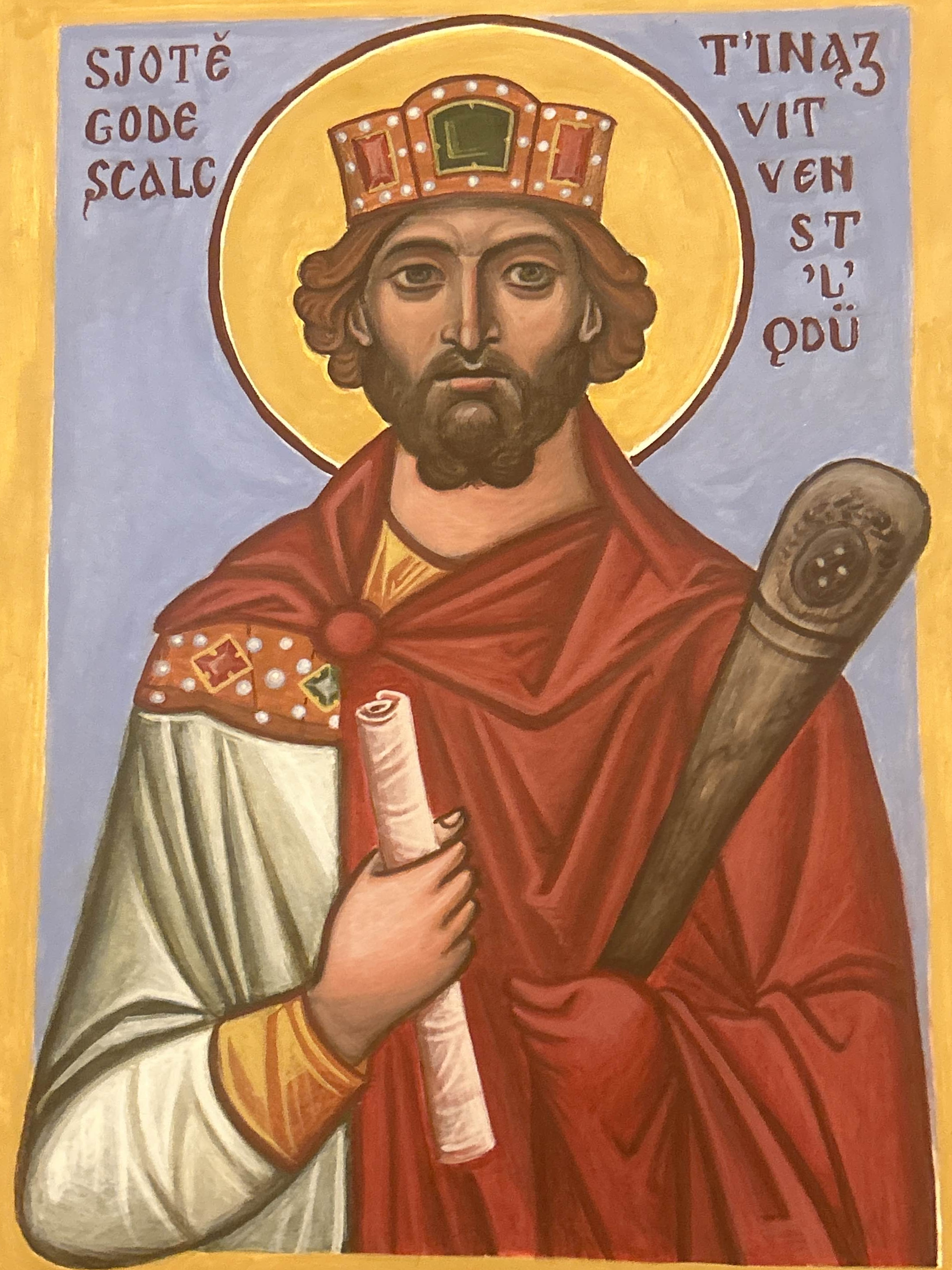
- Icon of Saint Gottschalk
- Born: 11th Century
- Died: 7 June 1066
- Venerated in: Catholic Church
- Feast: 7 June
- Patronage: languages, linguists, lost vocations, princes, translators, Polabians
- Spouse: Sigrid Svendsdatter
- Issue Detail: Budivoj; Henry

Gottschalk, sometimes rendered as Godescalc (Latin: Godescalcus; died 7 June 1066), was a prince of the Obotrite confederacy from 1043 to 1066. He established a Polabian Slavic kingdom on the Elbe (in the area of present-day northeastern Germany) in the mid-11th century. His object in life seems to have been to collect the scattered tribes of the Slavs into one kingdom, and to make that kingdom Christian.

"A pious and god-fearing man", Gottschalk effected the Christianisation of the Slavic tribes of the Elbe. He organised missions of German priests and founded monasteries at Oldenburg, Mecklenburg, Ratzeburg, Lübeck, and Lenzen, erecting the first three into dioceses. He himself often accompanied the missionaries on their work and augmented their message with his own explanations and instructions. In all this, he was supported by the efforts of Adalbert, Archbishop of Hamburg. However, the Obotrite nobility and peasantry largely remained pagan.

== Life ==
Gottschalk's father Udo was a bad Christian (male christianus according to Adam of Bremen) whose own father, Mistiwoi, had renounced the new religion for the old Slavic paganism. Udo sent his son to be educated at the monastery of St. Michael at Lenzen and later at Lüneburg. After a Saxon murdered Udo in 1028, Gottschalk renounced Christianity and took over the leadership of the Liutizi to avenge his father. He killed many Saxons before Duke Bernard II of Saxony defeated and captured him; his lands went to Ratibor of the Polabians.

Re-converted to Christianity, Gottschalk was released and sent to Denmark with many of his people to serve King Canute the Great in his wars with Norway. He was sent to England with Canute's son Sweyn.

Sven Estridson, Jarl of Denmark, desired independence from King Magnus I of Norway in 1042. Because Magnus was supported by his brother-in-law, Bernard II, Sven achieved an alliance with the Obotrites through the mediation of Gottschalk. However, the Obotrite chief Ratibor was killed in a siege by Magnus in 1043. The death of Ratibor and his sons allowed Gottschalk, who married Sven's daughter Sigrid, to seek the inheritance of his father Udo as Prince of the Obodrites. During the so-called Liutizi Civil War (Lutizischer Bruderkrieg) of 1057, Gottschalk conquered the Circipani and Kessini. He secured the territory through the building of new fortresses; the old fortifications of the conquered tribes were removed. He subdued the Liutizi and the diocese of Bremen "feared him as king" and paid him tribute. He nurtured alliance with his Christian neighbours, Scandinavian and German and joined in an alliance with Duke Bernard and King Magnus to defeat the Liutizi in battle.

Allied with the Lutici, the Obotrites murdered Gottschalk in a 1066 rebellion, capturing the castle of Lenzen and forcing his sons Henry and Budivoj to flee to Denmark and to Lüneburg respectively. Initially the Lutici-Obotrie alliance was led by Blus, but after his death in 1066, Kruto, whose power-base was Wagria, replaced him. Budivoj campaigned against Kruto with Saxon assistance, but was killed at Plön in 1075. Henry succeeded in avenging his father's death by killing Kruto at a feast in 1090.

Gottschalk's feast is the day of his death, according to the Carthusians of Brussels in the Martyrology of Usuardus. The primary sources for his life are Adam of Bremen and Helmold. "Had he lived, he would have brought all pagans to the Christian faith." His son Henry later championed the missionary work of Vicelinus.

== Butler's account ==
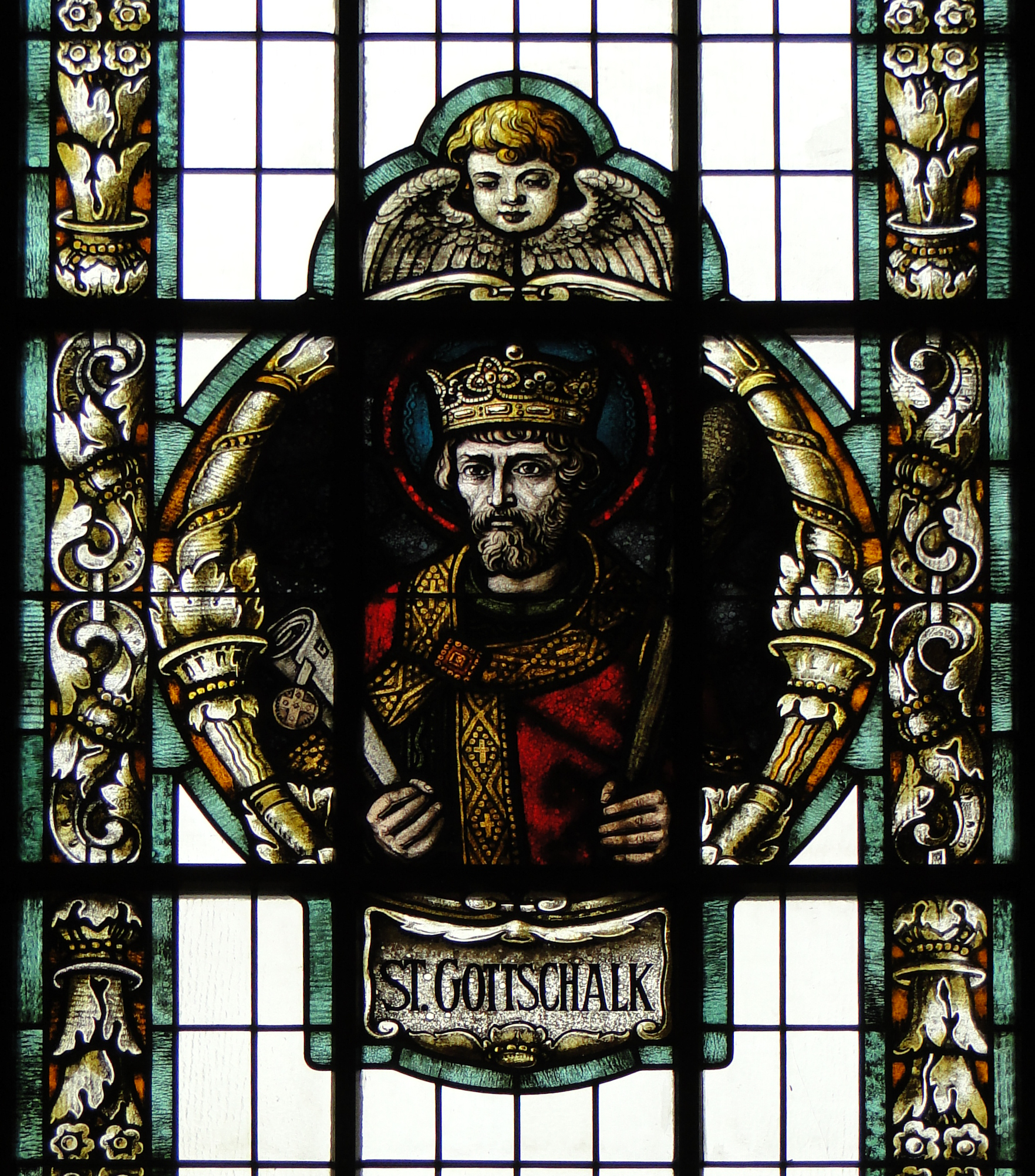
Gottschalk in stained glass

The hagiographer Alban Butler (1710–1773) wrote in his Lives of the Fathers, Martyrs, and Other Principal Saints under June 7,

St. Godeschalc, Prince of the Western Vandals, and His Companions, Martyrs

IN the reign of the emperor Henry the Salic, Gneus and Anatrog, who were idolaters, and Uto, the son of Misliwoi, a loose Christian, were princes of the Winuli, Slavi, and Vandals, and tributary to the emperor, the fear of whose arms and those of Knut, king of Denmark, and Bernard, duke of Saxony, kept these barbarians long in peace. Uto being murdered by a certain Saxon for his cruelty, his son Godeschalc, who had been educated a Christian in the monastery of Lumburg, under the care of Godeschalc, a Gothic bishop, apostatized, and joined the two Pagan princes, to revenge his father’s death upon the Saxons. He long harassed their country till he was taken prisoner by Duke Bernard, who detained him a long time in close confinement. When he recovered his liberty, Ratibor, a powerful prince, was possessed of his territories among the Slavi. Godeschalc therefore betook himself to the Danes at the head of a numerous troop of Slavi, his partisans. Some time after, he was converted to the Christian faith by a certain Saxon, and king Knut employed him in his wars in Norway, and being much pleased with his valiant behaviour, afterwards sent him with Sueno, his nephew by his sister Ethride, afterwards king, on an expedition into England. His great exploits there were so agreeable to the king of Denmark, that he gave him his daughter in marriage. After the death of Knut and his children, Godeschalc returned from England, subdued the whole country of the Slavi, and compelled part of the Saxons to pay him a yearly tribute, and to acknowledge their subjection.

He reigned after this many years in peace, and is called by Adam of Bremen the most powerful of all the princes who ever arrived at the sovereignty among the Slavi. And as he surpassed all the rest in prudence, power, and valour, so did he also after his conversion in piety and holy zeal. All the parts of his dominions he filled with churches and priests, and by his zealous endeavours he brought over to the faith great part of the idolaters among the different nations that were subject to him, as the Wagiri, the Obotridi or Reregi, the Polabingi, the Linoges, the Warnabi, the Chissini, and the Circipani, who inhabited the northern coast of Germany, from the Elbe to Mecklenburgh. He likewise founded many monasteries of both sexes at Lubec, Aldinburgh, Lenzin, Razizburg, three in the city of Magdeburg, and others in other places. The archbishop of Hamburg he honoured as his father, and frequently resorted to that city to perform his devotions in that metropolitical church. Among the missionaries who laboured with the greatest success in executing the holy projects of the king, Helmold names in the first place, John, a Scotsman, whom Albert, archbishop of Hamburg, sent to preach at Mecklenburg. He extended his missions into all the dominions of Godeschalc, and baptized himself many thousands. Godeschalc often interpreted to the people in the Sclavonian tongue the sermons and instructions of the priests in the church.

During the reign of the good emperor Henry II., the Slavi, Bohemians, and Hungarians lived in peace and in subjection to his empire. But when his son, a child only eight years old, succeeded to his throne, various rebellions were raised among these barbarians. Bernard, the duke, who had governed Saxony forty years, died soon after St. Henry, and his dominions were divided between his two sons Ordulf and Herman. Ordulf, who took the title of duke of Saxony, fell far short of his father in military skill and valour. Five years after this, the Vandals, or Slavi, who remained obstinately attached to their idolatry, about the present country of Wagrie and the duchy of Mecklenburg, revolted, and began their sedition by the murder of Godeschalc, the Machabee of the Christians, whom they slew in the city of Lenzin, on 7 June, together with Ebbo, a priest, whom they laid upon the altar and stabbed in 1066.

The historians of the northern nations unanimously agree that the only cause of their death was the hatred which these Pagans had conceived of the Christian religion: and the Carthusians of Brussels, in their additions to the Martyrology of Usuard, place them among the martyrs honoured in the church on this day. Upon this authority Henschenius, t. 2, Junij. p. 40, doubts not but St. Godeschalc and his companions were honoured in several of the northern churches, whose calendars and ecclesiastical monuments and titles were entirely destroyed or lost upon the change of religion, as the Bollandists, in their notes on St. Norbert’s life, and in other places, and Jos. Assemani on Adalbert of Magdeburg, take notice. On St. Godeschalc and his companions, see Adam Bremensis, l. 3, c. 21. Kranzius, l. 2. Wandaliæ, c. 46. Helmold and other northern historians, and from them Henschenius, t. 2, Junij, p. 40.

== Sources ==
- Butler, Alban (1799), The Lives of the Primitive Fathers, Martyrs, and Other Principal Saints, vol. VI, Edinburgh: J. Moir
- Gwatkin, H. M.; Whitney, J.P., eds. (1926), The Cambridge Medieval History, vol. III, Cambridge University Press, pp. 805–806
- Herrmann, Joachim (1970). Die Slawen in Deutschland (in German). Berlin: Akademie-Verlag GmbH. p. 530.
- North, Michael (2015), The Baltic, Harvard University Press, ISBN 9780674426047
- Grewolls, Grete (2011). Wer war wer in Mecklenburg und Vorpommern. Das Personenlexikon (in German). Rostock: Hinstorff Verlag. p. 3451. ISBN 978-3-356-01301-6.
- "St. Gottschalk". Bakersfield, California: Catholic Online.
