= Slavomir (Obotrite prince) =

- Oborite prince
- Reign: 809 – 819
- Predecessor: Thrasco
- Successor: Cedragus
- Died: 821; Saxony

Slavomir (Latin: Sclaomir, died 821 in Saxony) was a legendary tribal prince of the Obotrites (Note: In Frankish sources, he is titled king (Kasperski (2014, p. 91)).) from 809/810 (Note: He does not appear in the sources until 817 (Turasiewicz (2004, pp. 52–53)). Only Strzelczyk (2006, p. 237) has some doubt that Slavomir was the direct successor to Cedragos.) to 819. In 817, he allied with the Danes and opposed the Franks. In 819, he was dethroned and exiled, but reinstated shortly before his death in 821.

== In alliance with the Franks (809–817) ==
He assumed power over the Obotrites after the murder of King Thrasco by the Danes. At that time, the emperor exercised supreme authority over this group of Slavs. In 809 or 810, Charlemagne appointed him as the king of the Obodrites. In 811, he attempted, with the help of the Franks and Saxons, to restore his authority over the tribes of the Linones and the Bethenici, who had soon after Thrasco's death thrown off their dependence on the Obodrites. Four years later, in 815, he assisted Emperor Louis the Pious during the Frankish intervention in Denmark. The Saxon-Obotrite army, under the command of Missus Baldric of Friuli, was tasked with restoring Harald Klak to the throne. However, this expedition was unsuccessful, and after ravaging central Denmark, its participants withdrew to Saxony.

== In alliance with Denmark (817–821) ==
In 817, Louis the Pious demanded that Slavomir share power over the Obodrites with Cedragus, the son of Thrasco. It is possible that the emperor aimed to weaken the Obodrite authority through this division. It is also possible that he complied with the requests of Cedragus himself and the nobles supporting him. (Note: According to McKitterick (2013, p. 156), Louis the Pious may have tried to introduce the Frankish model of succession (from father to son) to the Obodrites.) Louis may have become acquainted with the position of the latter when, in July 815, an Obodrite embassy was present at the imperial court. Slavomir even swore that he would never again cross the Elbe. (Note: The emperor often ordered subordinate rulers to appear at court to confirm dependency (Barkowski (2018, pp. 174–175)).) Open opposition of the Obodrites against Frankish influence occurred in 817. (Note: According to McKitterick (2013, p. 156), the revolt occurred in 818.) Refusing to submit to the emperor's orders, Slavomir simultaneously sent an embassy to the sons of the Danish king Gudfred, with whom he formed a military alliance. A joint attack plan on imperial territories was also agreed upon. The Danes and Obodrites were to divide the conquered lands inhabited by the Nordalbingians. Gudfred's sons sent a fleet up the Elbe, while the land forces of both the Obodrites and Danes plundered the bordering provinces. However, the military actions were limited to the unsuccessful siege of the border fortress of Itzehoe by the Danish-Obodrite forces.

In 819, Louis sent a punitive Saxon-Frankish expedition across the Elbe against Slavomir, commanded by his legates. The ruler of the Obodrites suffered defeat and was brought by imperial troops to Aachen. There, not only the Franks but also the influential Obodrite nobles opposed him, accusing him of unspecified "numerous crimes". Slavomir was exiled, and the Obodrite throne was handed over to Cedragus by the emperor.

Slavomir remained in exile until 821. In that year, due to loss of trust in Cedragus, (Note: Cedragus was accused of trying to renew the alliance with the Danes and treason (Labuda (1975, p. 242); McKitterick (2013, p. 156)).) Louis the Pious again designated the exile as the prince of the Obodrites and allowed him to return. However, during the journey, he fell seriously ill and, having previously received baptism, died in Saxony.

== Bibliography ==
- Barkowski, Robert F. (2018). Bitwy Słowian. Warsaw: Bellona. ISBN 978-83-11-15537-4.
- Kasperski, Robert (2014). Dalewski, Zbigniew (ed.). Frankowie i Obodryci: tworzenie "plemion" i "królów" na słowiańskim Połabiu w IX wieku. Warsaw: Instytut Historii PAN. ISBN 978-83-63352-40-0.
- Labuda, Gerard (1975). Sławomir. Słownik Starożytności Słowiańskich. Vol. V. Wrocław: Zakład Narodowy im. Ossolińskich. ISBN 83-04-00080-6.
- McKitterick, Rosamond (2013). Królestwa Karolingów. Władza – konflikty – kultura. 751 – 987. Warsaw: Wydawnictwo Naukowe PWN. ISBN 978-83-01-17440-8.
- Strzelczyk, Jerzy (2006). Zapomniane narody Europy. Wrocław: Zakład Narodowy im. Ossolińskich. ISBN 978-83-04047693.
- Turasiewicz, Adam (2004). Grott, Bogumił (ed.). Dzieje polityczne Obodrzyców: od IX wieku do utraty niepodległości w latach 1160–1164. Kraków: Nomos. ISBN 83-88508-65-2. OCLC 830637109.
