= Ratibor (Obotrite prince) =

Ratibor (or Ratse) (died 1043) was a prince of the Obotrite confederacy from the Polabian tribe. His capital was Ratzeburg, which was named in his honor.

After Saxons killed Prince Udo of the Obotrites in 1028, his son Gottschalk was taken to be raised at the court of Canute the Great of Denmark. Ratibor led the Obotrite confederacy during Gottschalk's absence.

Sven Estridson, Jarl of Denmark, desired independence from King Magnus I of Norway in 1042. Because Magnus was supported by his brother-in-law, Duke Bernard II of Saxony, Sven achieved an alliance with the Obotrites through the mediation of Gottschalk. However, Ratibor was killed in a siege by Magnus in 1043. In an attempt to avenge their father, his sons were killed in the same year in a battle at Lürschau Heath on 28 September.
