= Limes Saxoniae =

Carolingian border between Saxons and Slavs

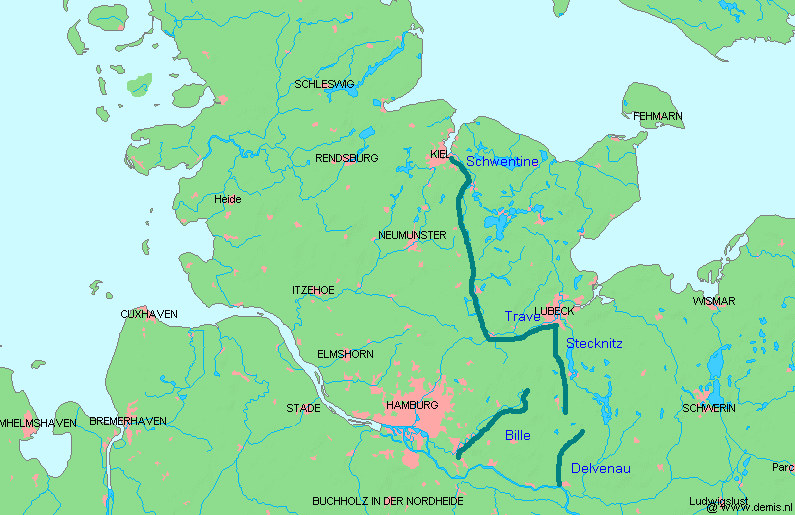
The Limes Saxoniae

The Limes Saxoniae (Latin for "Limit of Saxony"), also known as the Limes Saxonicus or Sachsenwall ("Saxon Dyke"), was an unfortified limes or border between the Saxons and the Slavic Obotrites, established about 810 in present-day Schleswig-Holstein.

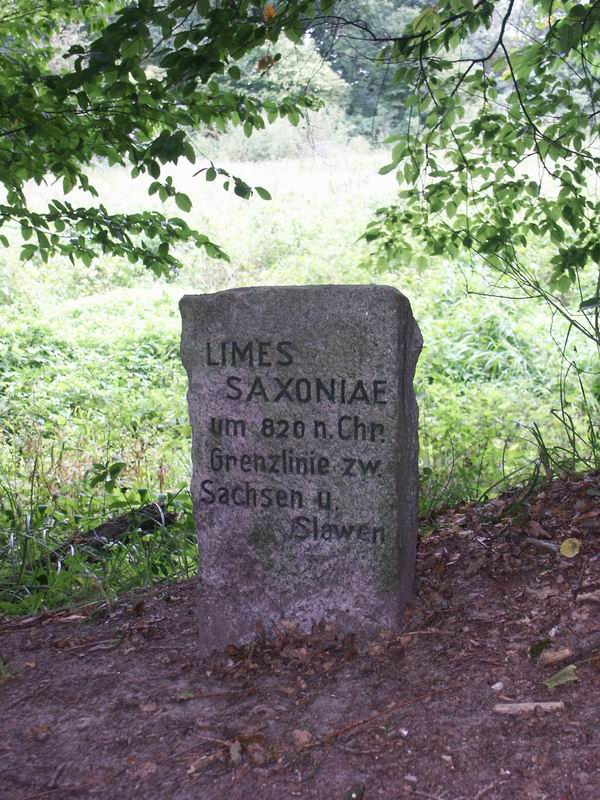
Modern monument dedicated to the Limes Saxoniae near Hornbek

After Charlemagne had removed Saxons from some of their lands and given it to the Obotrites (who were allies of Charlemagne), he finally managed to conquer the Saxons in the Saxon Wars. In 811 he signed the Treaty of Heiligen with the neighbouring Danes and may at the same time have reached a border agreement with the Polabian Slavs in the east. This border should not be thought of as a fortified line, however, but rather a defined line running through the middle of the border zone, an area of bog and thick forest that was difficult to pass through. According to Adam of Bremen's description in the Gesta Hammaburgensis ecclesiae pontificum about 1075, it ran from the Elbe river near Boizenburg northwards along the Bille river to the mouth of the Schwentine at the Kiel Fjord and the Baltic Sea.

It was breached several times by the Slavic Obotrites (983 and 1086) and Mieszko II Lambert of Poland (1028 and 1030). The Limes was dissolved during the first phase of the Ostsiedlung, when Count Henry of Badewide campaigned in Wagrian lands in 1138/39 and the Slavic population was Germanized by German, mostly Saxon, settlers.

== Bibliography ==
- Matthias Hardt: "Hesse, Elbe, Saale and the Frontiers of the Carolingian Empire." In: Walther Pool / Ian N. Wood / Helmut Reimitz (Hrsg.): The Transformation of Frontiers from Late Antiquity to the Carolingians. The Transformation of the Roman World 10. Leiden-Boston-Köln 2001, S. 219–232, ISBN 90-04-11115-8.
- Matthias Hardt: "Limes Saxoniae." In: Reallexikon der Germanischen Altertumskunde, Bd. 18, Landschaftsrecht – Loxstedt. Berlin-New York 2001, S. 442–446, ISBN 3-11-016950-9.
- Günther Bock: "Böhmische Dörfer“ in Stormarn? – Verlauf und Bedeutung des Limes Saxoniae zwischen Bille und Trave." In: Derselbe: Studien zur Geschichte Stormarns im Mittelalter. Neumünster 1996 (Stormarner Hefte 19), S. 25–70 (mit Karten), ISBN 978-3-529-07124-9.
