= Obotrites =

8–12th century West Slavic tribes

Obotritic confederation
- 8th century–1167
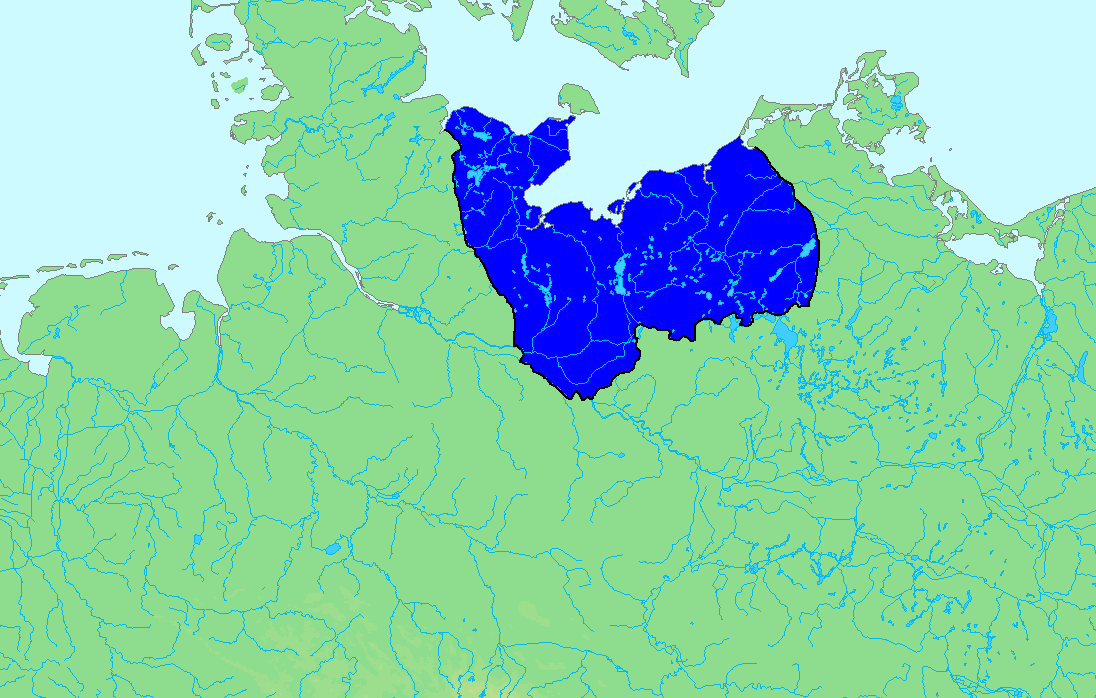
- Main territory of the Obotritic confederation

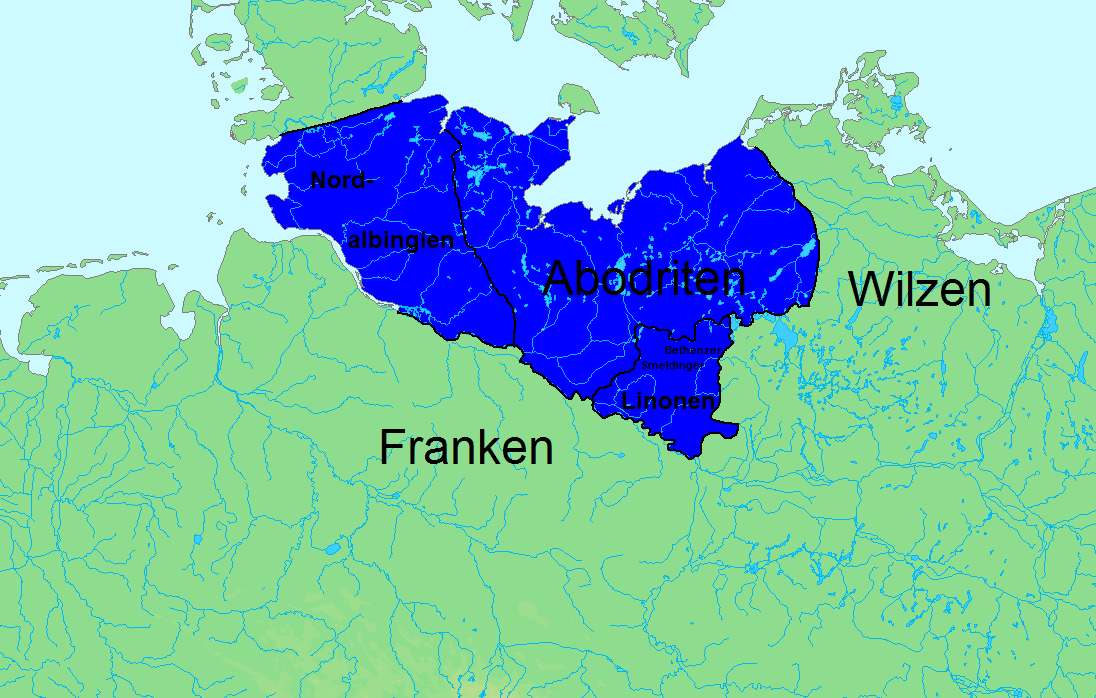
- Expansion of the Obotritic confederation under Prince Thrasco († 809) after victory over the Nordalbingian Saxons
- Status: Independent confederation of Polabian Slavic tribes
- Capital: Veligard or Veligrad (German: Michelenburg)
- Common languages: Polabian, Old Saxon
- Religion: Polabian (Note: Compared to the original old Slavic religion, the pagan religion of Polabian Slavs was "reformed" (improved) by wooden temples and priesthood as a high social class with political influence. Almost every Polabian tribe had its own pagan cult of a deity of military function or some version of the supreme god, whose high priests had sometimes military retinue and were equal to the chiefs or politically stronger. This made a pagan cults more organized and the Polabian Slavs more resistant to Christianization than other Slavic peoples who had less organized paganism and was practiced as a folk religion. It also caused the creation of a local theocracies.) Slavic paganism, the known major cults: Prove in Stargard, Wagria; Podaga in Plön, Wagria; Zhiva according to Helmold; Svarozhich/Radegast according to Helmold; folk polytheism of minor cults; Chernobog according to Helmold; Saxon paganism (Nordalbingian Saxons); Chalcedonian Christianity (missionaries, some nobles)
- Government: Hereditary monarchy (Principality)
- Prince
  - ?–ca. 795 (first): Witzlaus
  - 1160–1167 (last): Pribislav
- History
  - Formed: 8th century
  - Accepted Saxon suzerainty: 1167
Preceded by
Polabian Slavs
Nordalbingia (Duchy of Saxony)
Billung March (Duchy of Saxony)
Succeeded by
Holy Roman Empire
∟Principality of Mecklenburg
∟Duchy of Saxony
Kingdom of Denmark
- Today part of: Germany

The Obotrites (Latin: Obotriti, Abodritorum, Abodritos) or Obodrites, also spelled Abodrites (German: Abodriten), were a confederation of medieval West Slavic tribes within the territory of modern Mecklenburg and Holstein in northern Germany (see Polabian Slavs). For decades, they were allies of Charlemagne in his wars against the Germanic Saxons and the Slavic Veleti.

The Obotrites under Prince Thrasco defeated the Saxons in the Battle of Bornhöved (798). The still-Pagan Saxons were dispersed by the emperor, and the part of their former land in Holstein north of Elbe was awarded to the Obotrites in 804, as a reward for their victory. This however was soon reverted through an invasion of the Danes. The Obotrite regnal style was abolished in 1167, when Pribislav was restored to power by Duke Henry the Lion, as Prince of Mecklenburg, thereby founding the Germanized House of Mecklenburg.

== Etymology ==
The ethnonym Obotrites (≈ Abodrites) is commonly traced to the Slavic root *bodr- ('cheerful, lively, brave; vigorous; alert'; cf. Bulg. бодър, Rus. бодрый, Pol. bodry [arch.], OCS бодръ). In this interpretation, Bodriči (≈ Obodrity) would signify 'the spirited/brave ones', with o- as a common Slavic prefix and -it- / -ič- serving as an ethnonymic formation.

== History ==
=== Obotritic confederation ===
The Bavarian Geographer, an anonymous medieval document compiled in Regensburg in 830, contains a list of the tribes in Central Eastern Europe to the east of the Elbe. The list includes the Nortabtrezi (Obotrites) - with 53 civitates. Adam of Bremen referred to them as the Reregi because of their lucrative trade emporium Reric. In common with other Slavic groups, they were often described by Germanic sources as Wends.

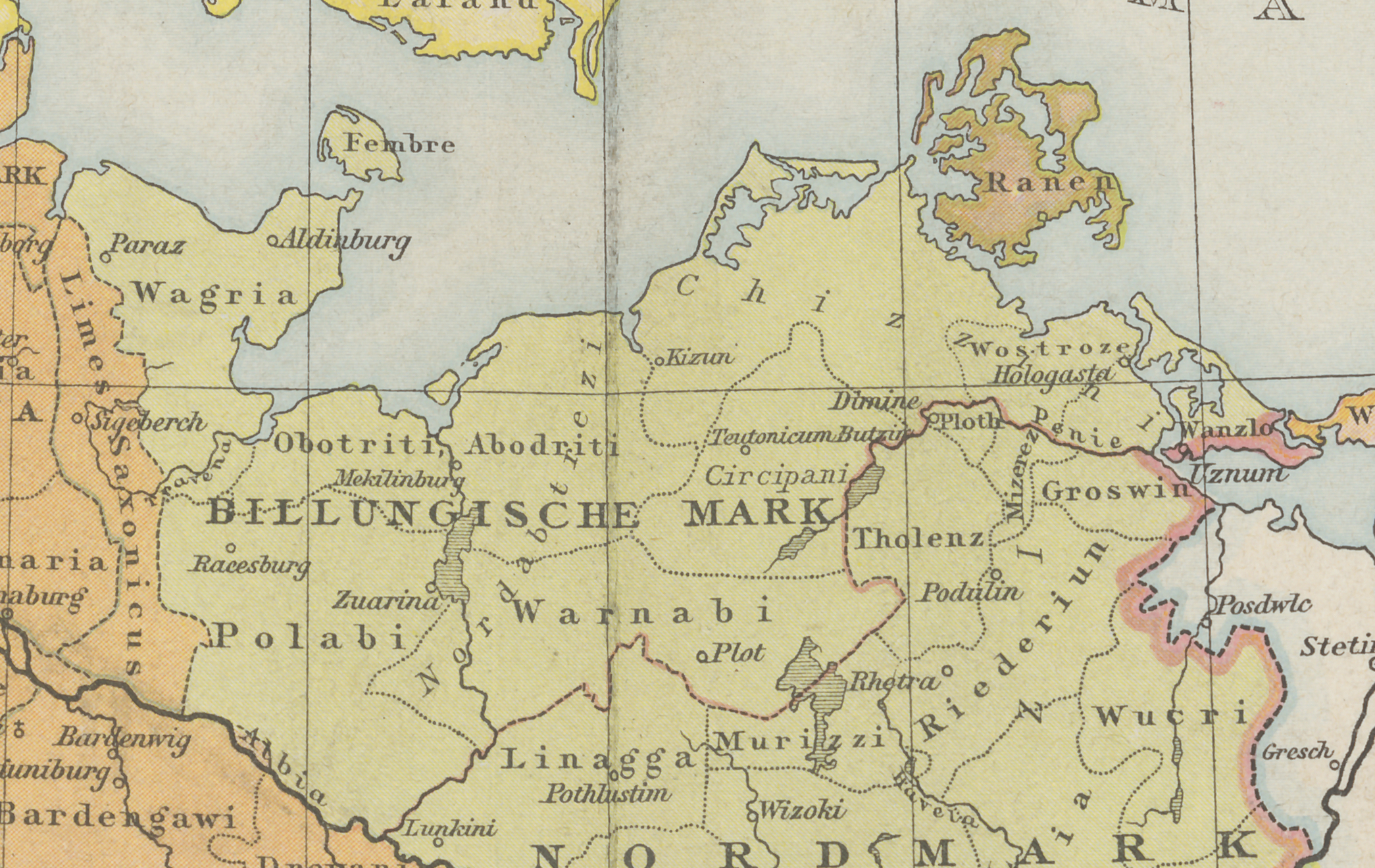
Map of the Billunger Mark (c. 1000) showing different tribes of the Obotritic confederation

The main tribes of the Obotritic confederation were:

- the Obotrites proper (Wismar Bay to Lake Schwerin);
- the Wagrians (the eastern Holstein as part of Saxony);
- the Warnower (the upper Warnow and Mildenitz);
- the Polabians proper (between the Trave and the Elbe).

Other tribes associated with the confederation include:

- the Linonen near Lenzen,
- the Travnjane near the Trave,
- the Drevani in the Hanoverian Wendland.
- the Ukrani in Prenzlau.

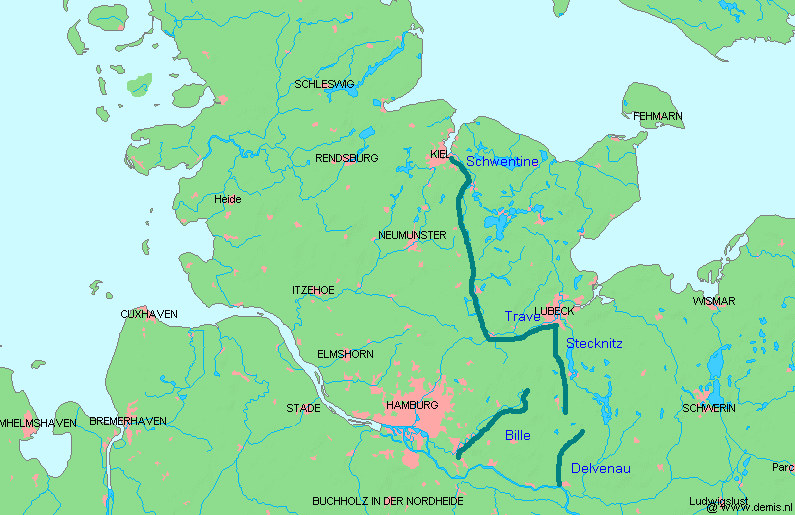
The Limes Saxoniae forming the border between the Saxons to the west and the Obotrites to the east

As allies of the Carolingian kings and the empire of their Ottonian successors, the Obotrites fought from 808 to 1200 against the kings of Denmark, and on occasion the Franks, Northern Christian forces, and in later years, the Holy Roman Empire. They fought on occasion with them, but their main enemy were the kings of Denmark, who wished to rule the Baltic region independently of the empire. When opportunities arose, for instance upon the death of an emperor, they would seek to seize power; and in 983 Hamburg was destroyed by the Obotrites under their king, Mstivoj. At times they levied tribute from the Danes and Saxons. Under the leadership of Niklot, they resisted a Christian assault during the Wendish Crusade.

German missionaries such as Vicelinus converted the Obotrites to Christianity. In 1170 they acknowledged the suzerainty of the Holy Roman Empire, leading to Germanisation and assimilation over the following centuries. However, up to the late 15th century most villagers in the Obotritic area were still speaking Slavic dialects (Polabian language), although subsequently their language was displaced by German. The Polabian language survived until the beginning of the 19th century in Hanoverian Wendland, eastern Lower Saxony (bordering modern Mecklenburg-Western Pomerania). The ruling clan of the Obotrites kept its power throughout the Germanisation and ruled their country (except during a short interruption in Thirty Years' War) as House of Mecklenburg until the end of monarchies in Germany in November Revolution 1918. Previously, the Obodrites were dominated by the Naconids; Eastern (Far) Pomerania was ruled by the Pomeranian House (Grifichi).

== List of Obotrite leaders ==
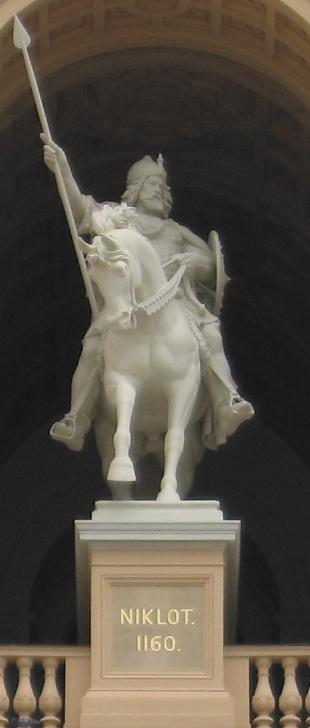
Niklot (1090–1160), prince of the Obotritic confederation and founder of the Mecklenburg House, Schwerin Castle

Ruler	Reign	Notes
Witzlaus	?–ca. 795	
Thrasco	?–ca. 795–810	
Slavomir	?–810–819	Ally of the Frankish Empire. In 816, he joined the rebellion of the Sorbs. Eventually captured and abandoned by his own people, being replaced by Ceadrag in 818.
Ceadrag	819–after 826	Ally of the Frankish Empire. He rebelled against the Franks with alliance with the Danes, but later was reconciled with Franks.
Selibur
Nako	954–966	Nako and his brother Stoigniew were defeated at the Raxa river (955) by Otto I, after which Stoigniew was beheaded and Nako accepted Christianity, resulting in thirty years of peace.
Mstivoj and Mstidrag	966–995	Sons of Nako. They abandoned Christianity and revolted against the Germans (Great Slav Rising).
Mieceslas III	919–999	in 995 defeated by Otto III, Holy Roman Emperor.
Mstislav	996–1018	
Udo or Przybigniew	1018–1028	
Ratibor	1028–1043	
Gottschalk	1043 to 1066	
Budivoj	1066 and 1069	
Kruto	1066–1069 and 1069–1093	
Henry	1093–1127	
Canute & Sviatopolk	1127–1128	
Sviatopolk	1128–1129	
Zwinike	1129–1129	
Canute	1129–1131	Great-great-great-great-grandson of Mstivoj
Niklot	1131–1160	Born around 1090. Also ruled the subdued Polabian Slav tribes of Kessinians and Circipanians.
Pribislav	1160–1167	Last Obotrite prince. Accepted Saxon suzerainty in 1167.

The rulers of Obotrite lands were later the dukes and grand dukes of Mecklenburg.

== See also ==
- List of Medieval Slavic tribes
- Praedenecenti
- Slavic settlement of the Eastern Alps

== Literature ==
- Herrmann, Joachim (1970). Die Slawen in Deutschland (in German). Berlin: Akademie-Verlag GmbH.
- Müller-Wille, Michael (2002). "Zwischen Kieler Förde und Wismarbucht: Archäologie der Obodriten vom späten 7. bis zur Mitte des 12. Jahrhunderts." In: Bericht der Römisch-Germanischen Kommission, vol. 83, pp. 243–264.
- Turasiewicz A., Dzieje polityczne Obodrzyców od IX wieku do utraty niepodległości w latach 1160–1164, Warszawa, 2004, ISBN 83-88508-65-2 (in Polish)
