= Lothair Udo I =

Margrave of Nordmark and Count of Stade

- Margrave of the Nordmark and Count of Stade
- Born: 994
- Died: 7 November 1057 (aged 62–63); Neindorf, Duchy of Saxony
- Family: Udonids
- Spouses: Adelheid, Countess of Oeningen; Ida von Elstorf (died 1052)
- Issue: Lothair Udo II, Margrave of the Nordmark; Oda, Grand Princess of Kiev; Ekbert of Stade
- Father: Siegfried II, Count of Stade
- Mother: Adela of Rhienfelden

Lothair Udo I (994 – 7 November 1057), Margrave of Nordmark and Count of Stade (as Lothair Udo II), son of Siegfried II, Count of Stade, and Adela of Rhienfelden, daughter of Gero, Count of Alsleben. Lothair was the first of the House of Udonids to serve as margrave.

Lothair was in conflict with Adelbert, Bishop of Bremen, over jurisdiction of the county and, in 1053, killed his cousin Ekbert of Elsdorf-Stade, inheriting his land. In 1044, William became Margrave of Nordmark, and, as a Saxon leader, was defeated in 1056 by the Liutizi at the Battle of Pritziawa. Lothair was appointed margrave later that year. This appointment was opposed by Otto, illegitimate son of Bernard, and Lothair was killed by the Otto’s allies on 26 June 1057 at his home at Neindorf on the Selke.

Lothair married Adelheid, Countess of Oeningen, daughter of Count Kuno von Oeningen. Lothair and Adelheid had one son:

- Lothair Udo II, Margrave of the Nordmark

Lothair also married Ida von Elstorf (d. 1052), daughter of Liudolf, Margrave of Frisia, son of Gisela of Swabia, who was half-brother of Henry III, Holy Roman Emperor. They had two children:

- Oda of Stade, married Sviatoslav II Yaroslavich, Grand Prince of Kiev. Oda is believed to have arranged the marriage of her nephew Henry III the Long, Count of Stade, to Euproxia of Kiev. The son of Oda and Sviatoslav was Yaroslav Sviatoslavich, Prince of Murom
- Ekbert, murdered by his half-brother Lothair Udo II in Wickstadt, near Elstorf

Lothair Udo was succeeded by his son and namesake as both margrave and count. After Lothair Udo’s death, his son took vengeance on those who participated in his senseless murder, including his half-brother Ekbert. Otto, the instigator of Lothair Udo's murder, was killed in a battle near Hausneindorf in the summer of 1058.

== Sources ==
Warner, David A., Ottonian Germany: The Chronicon of Thietmar of Merseburg, Manchester University Press, Manchester, 2001

Reuter, Timothy, Germany in the Early Middle Ages, 800-1036, London and New York, 1992

Leyser, Karl, Medieval Germany and Its Neighbours 900-1250, The Hambledon Press, London, 1982

Bury, J. B. (editor), The Cambridge Medieval History: Volume III, Germany and the Western Empire, Cambridge University Press, 1922

Hucke, Richard G., Die Grafen von Stade 900-1144. Genealogie, politische Stellung, Comitat und Allodialbesitz der sächsischen Udonen; Diss. Kiel, Stade mit umfassenden Nachweisen der Quellen und älteren Literatur, 1956
