= Friedrich, Count of Stade =

Friedrich (died 13 April 1135), Count of Stade. Friedrich's mother was from England and died in a shipwreck off the coast of Germany. She was fleeing England after the conquest of the island by William the Conqueror.

Upon the death of Lothair Udo III in 1106, the title of Margrave of the Nordmark went to his brother Rudolf I. The title Count of Stade also went to Rudolf in all likelihood, but Friedrich was appointed to administer the county as Viscount of Stade until Lothar's son Henry could assume the role.

Friedrich aligned with Lothar of Süpplingenburg, then Duke of Saxony, against Emperor Henry V. He was imprisoned with Lothar, and eventually released by the emperor. After the Battle of Welfesholz, with no further help expected from the emperor, Lothar proved a good ally, and his role as count assured.

When Henry II came of age, he became Count of Stade. Upon his death in 1128, Friedrich was officially invested by Archbishop Adalbero of Bremen with the County of Stade.

After the death of Frederick in 1135, the County of Stade reverted to the House of Udonids, and the countship was assumed by Udo V. Frederick was buried in Harsefeld monastery next to the other counts of Stade.
