= Richardis von Stade =

Abbess of Bassum Abbey

Richardis von Stade (1124(?) – 29 October 1152) was a German nun and Benedictine abbess of Bassum Abbey. She was a member of the Udonids family as the daughter of Rudolf I, Margrave of the Nordmark and Richgard von Sponheim; and the sister of Hartwig, Count of Stade and Archbishop of Bremen, and Lutgard of Salzwedel, Queen consort of Denmark, Adelheid and Udo. She is best known for her intimate friendship with Hildegard von Bingen.

== Relationship with Hildegard von Bingen ==
Richardis spent many of her early years as the secretary and advisor to Hildegard von Bingen at the abbeys of Disibodenberg and Rupertsberg, where she edited, translated, and compiled Scivias, Hildegard's first publication of visionary writings. In 1151, she was elected abbess of Bassum Abbey, much to Hildegard's displeasure. In a letter to Richardis' mother, Richgard von Sponheim, Hildegard wrote that it is "certainly not God's will" for Richardis to be moved from her abbey. Despite a long series of letters from Hildegard to increasingly important people, Richardis was eventually moved. A year later, Count Hartwig sent a letter to Hildegard notifying her of Richardis' death. In her reply, Hildegard wrote that she "cherished [Richardis] with divine love".

== In popular culture ==
In Margarethe von Trotta's Vision (2009) Richardis was portrayed by Hannah Herzsprung.

Richardis is a character in Sarah Kirkland Snider's 2025 opera "HILDEGARD."

== Bibliography ==
- Hildegard, Saint; Baird, Joseph L. (2006). The personal correspondence of Hildegard of Bingen. Oxford: Oxford University Press. ISBN 0-19-530822-0. OCLC 64208224.
