= Volmar (monk) =

German monk (died 1173)

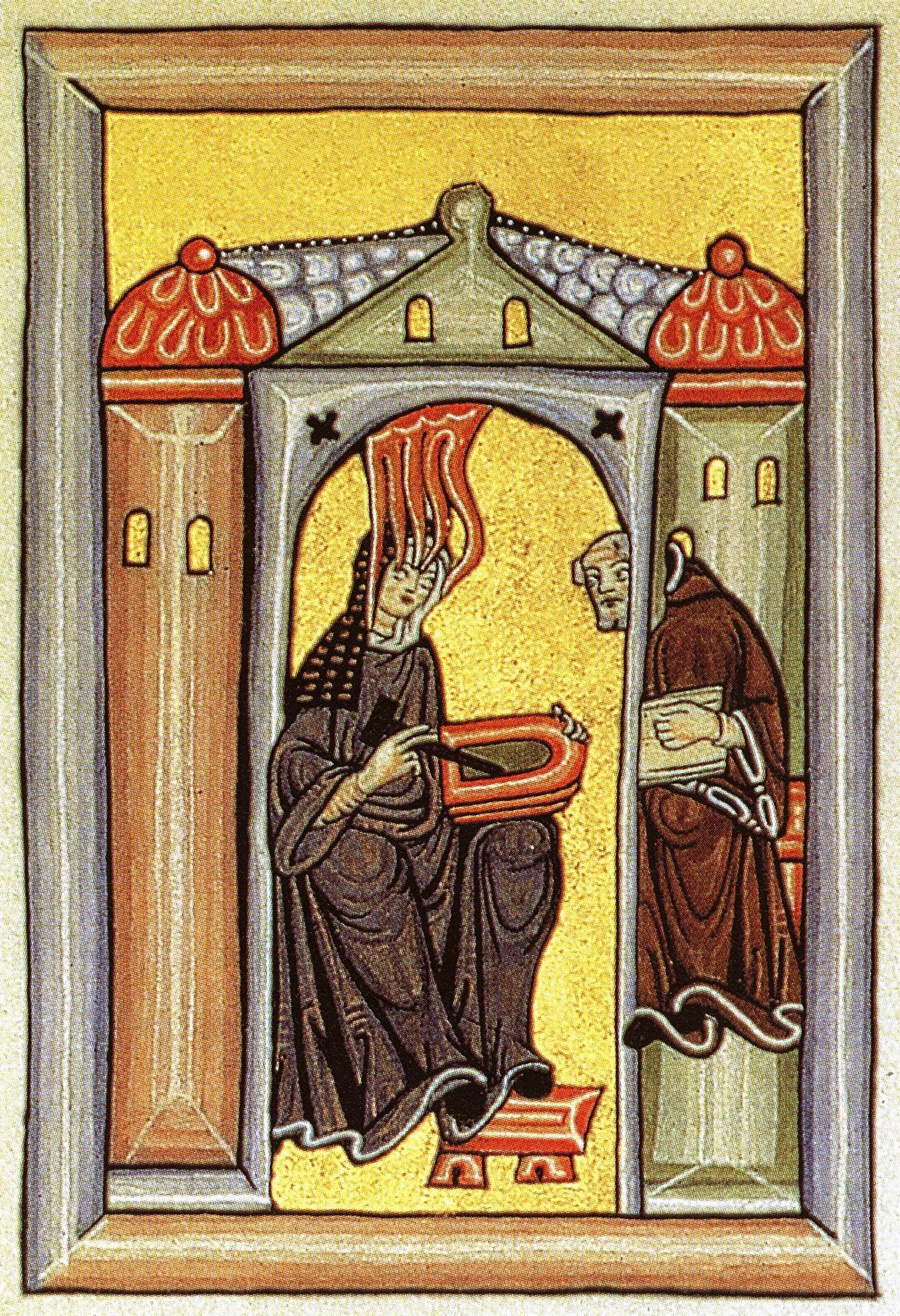
Illumination from Hildegard of Bingen's Scivias (1151) showing her receiving a vision and dictating to Volmar

Volmar (died 1173) was a Saint Disibod monk who acted as prior and father confessor for the nuns at Disibodenberg. He was one of two teachers of Hildegard of Bingen during her early years, the other being Jutta.

As a teenager, Hildegard began to realize her visions were unique experiences, and she broke her painful silence by discussing them with Jutta, who told Volmar. Volmar, in turn, became the first person to validate Hildegard's visions. He mentored her and her brother Bruno for a time, and when her self-doubts plagued her, he was the one who urged her to follow the command of God to write down her visions. Volmar recognized Hildegard's rare spiritual talents and later became her secretary and good friend. They knew each other for over sixty years, and when he died in 1173, Hildegard grieved. She had become especially close to this monk.

In Hildegard's ground-breaking allegorical musical, Ordo Virtutum, in which the Devil pursues, seduces, and eventually loses the Soul, Volmar may have voiced this diabolical part. Or, better put, Volmar may have "shouted" this role because the Devil is the only character in this play that does not sing—he has divorced himself from all heavenly harmony.

Volmar was also Hildegard's best editor, as she acknowledges below, in this section taken from her Book of Divine Works

While working on this book, I was much encouraged and assisted by Volmar, a monk who truly followed St. Benedict’s Rule. I was grief-stricken when he died. He was a happy man, and he helped me in so many ways. He served God by listening to every word of this vision, and he corrected them all and made them more orderly. He always kept me going.

He cautioned me never to stop writing because of my physical weaknesses and illnesses, but to persevere in setting down this vision. He served God until the day he died, always supporting me. I mourned him, saying: “Your will has now been done with this man, your servant, whom You gave me to help with these visions. Show me how to carry on!”

Abbot Ludwig of St. Eucharius in Trier stepped up next. He’s a wise man, and it proved valuable that he was familiar with Volmar and my visions. Provost Wezelin of St. Andrew’s in Cologne also came to my aid. His main desire was to do good works for God. These and other perspicacious men both consoled me and offered practical help with this book. Wezelin listened to the words of this vision without getting weary, finding them sweeter than honey.

That’s how this book came to be—through God’s grace and the help of many holy men. And I heard the living Light (Author of these visions) say, “I’ll also reward Volmar and these other monks who helped in the making of this book."
