= Rudolf I of the Nordmark =

Count of Stade, Margrave of the Nordmark

Rudolf I
- Margrave of the Nordmark and Count of Stade
- Tenure: 1106 – 1112
- Died: 7 December 1124
- Noble family: Udonids
- Spouse: Richardis of Sponheim
- Issue: Udo IV, Margrave of the Nordmark; Rudolf II, Margrave of the Nordmark; Hartwig, Count of Stade; Lutgard, Queen of Denmark; Richardis of Stade
- Father: Lothair Udo II, Margrave of the Nordmark
- Mother: Oda of Werl

Rudolf I (died 7 December 1124), Margrave of the Nordmark and Count of Stade, son of Lothair Udo II, Margrave of the Nordmark, and Oda of Werl, daughter of Herman III, Count of Werl, and Richenza of Swabia. Rudolf was the brother of his predecessors Henry I the Long and Lothair Udo III.

In 1106 Rudolf became Margrave of Nordmark and Count of Stade after the death of his brother Lothair Udo III, as regent and guardian for Lothair's son Henry II. The Count of Stade was effectively administered by Friedrich while Henry II was still underage.

In 1112, Rudolf allied himself with Lothair of Supplinburg, then Duke of Saxony (and later Holy Roman Emperor) in opposing Emperor Henry V, and as a result was deposed from his position. He was replaced as margrave by Helperich von Plötzkau until 1114 when his nephew Henry became of age.

Rudolf was married to Richardis (Richgard), daughter of Hermann von Sponheim, Burgrave of Magdeburg, and granddaughter of Siegfried I, Count of Sponheim. Rudolf and Richardis had five children:

- Udo IV, Margrave of the Nordmark and Count of Stade (as Udo V)
- Rudolf II, Margrave of the Nordmark and Count of Stade
- Hartwig, Count of Stade and Archbishop of Bremen
- Lutgard of Salzwedel, married to Frederick II, Count of Sommerschenburg, Herman II, Count of Winzenburg, and Eric III, King of Denmark
- Richardis von Stade, Abbess at Bassum and close confidant of Saint Hildegard von Bingen.

Rudolf was deposed as margrave in 1112 and replaced by Helperich until his nephew Henry reached the age of maturity. Rudolf was succeeded as Count of Stade by Friedrich, not part of the House of Udonids, although it is unclear as to the precise dates of transition.

== Sources ==
Krause, Karl Ernst Hermann, Lothar Udo II. und das Stader Grafenhaus. In Allgemeine Deutsche Biographie (ADB). Band 19, Duncker & Humblot, Leipzig, 1884

Hausmann, Friedrich, Die Grafen zu Ortenburg und ihre Vorfahren im Mannesstamm, die Spanheimer in Kärnten, Sachsen und Bayern, sowie deren Nebenlinien. In Ostbairische Grenzmarken. Passauer Jahrbuch für Geschichte Kunst und Volkskunde. Nr. 36, Passau, 1994

Hucke, Richard G., Die Grafen von Stade. 900–1144. Genealogie, politische Stellung, Comitat und Allodial- besitz der sächsischen Udonen, Selbstverlag des Stader Geschichts und Heimatvereins, Stade, 1956

Raffensperger, Christian, Reimagining Europe, Harvard University Press, Cambridge, MA, 2012
