= Jutta von Sponheim =

German noble and nun

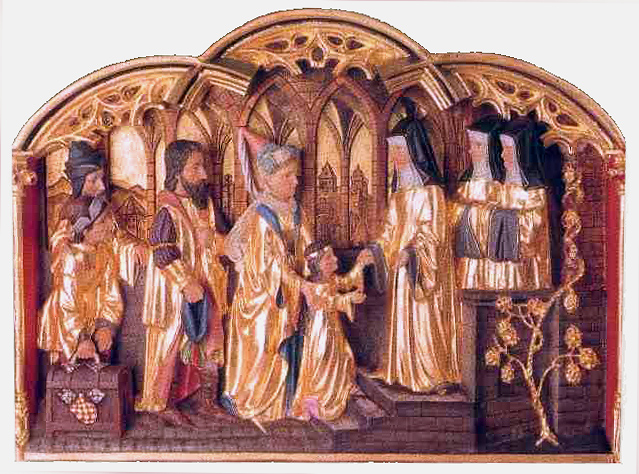
Eight-year-old Hildegard von Bingen is brought to Jutta von Sponheim on the Disibodenberg

Countess Jutta von Sponheim, also called Blessed Jutta of Disibodenberg (22 December 1091 – 1136) was an anchoress and teacher at the monastery of Disbodenberg who helped raise Hildegard von Bingen. Jutta was the youngest of four daughters of Count Stephen of Sponheim, born into affluent surroundings in what is currently the Rhineland-Palatinate. Jutta was also related to Marchioness Richardis von Stade, the mother of Hartwig, Archbishop of Bremen and of Richardis, who was intimate friends with Hildegard.

In the year 1104, when Jutta had just turned 12, she suffered a serious illness and promised her life to God if she recovered. However, her status as the daughter of a prominent household meant that she was expected to marry. Around 1106, she was able to appeal directly to Archbishop Ruthard of Mainz, who granted her nunhood and the protection of the church in return for her religious vows.

It is unclear where Jutta lived during the first years of her religious life, but she was described as having a "pious wanderlust." She was convinced instead to become a symbolic "anchor" for the world to God as part of an established monastery, and had a one-room shelter built for herself next to the Benedictine monastery at Disibodenberg, where she became abbess. When she was symbolically sealed into her role as anchoress on November 1st (All Saints' Day), 1112, Hildegard joined her. In her position at Disibodenberg she tutored several female pupils from wealthy families and many lived with her in her hermitage, but her most notable pupil was Hildegard, who was just six years her junior.

Jutta taught Hildegard to write; to read the collection of psalms used in the liturgy; and to chant the Opus Dei (‘work of God’), the weekly sequential recitation of the Canonical hours. She probably also taught Hildegard to play the zither-like string instrument called the psaltery.

Jutta was a severe practitioner of asceticism, including penitential self-flagellation. She wore a chain under her clothes, prayed barefoot in the extreme cold of a German winter, and refused the allowed (and even encouraged) modifications to the Benedictine diet for those who were sick.

== Notes ==
- Descriptions of Jutta's life are drawn largely from a single source ("Vita domnae Jutta inclusae", or "Vita Juttae") written by an anonymous monk and discovered by Franz Staab in 1992: Reform und Reformgruppen im Erzbistum Mainz. Vom ’Libellus de Willigisi consuetudinibus’ zur ’Vita domnae Juttae inclusae’, Anhang II. In: Quellen und Abhandlungen zur mittelrheinischen Kirchengeschichte Bd. 68: Reformidee und Reformpolitik im spätsalisch-frühstaufischen Reich…, 1992, pp. 172.
