= Udo IV, Margrave of the Nordmark =

Udo IV
- Margrave of the Nordmark and Count of Stade
- Tenure: 1128 – 1130
- Died: 15 February 1130; Aschersleben, Duchy of Saxony
- Noble family: Udonids
- Spouse: Mathilde of Winzenburg
- Father: Rudolf I, Margrave of the Nordmark
- Mother: Richardis of Sponheim

Udo IV (died 15 February 1130), Margrave of the Nordmark and Count of Stade (as Udo V) and Count of Freckleben, son of Rudolf I, Margrave of the Nordmark, and Richardis, daughter of Hermann von Sponheim, Burgrave of Magdeburg. It is unclear why he went by the abbreviated name of Udo as opposed to the traditional Lothair Udo of his ancestors.

When Henry II died on 4 December 1128 without an heir, his uncle Albert the Bear hoped to become margrave, but Udo was favored by Emperor Henry III and assumed control of the margraviate. He remained in a bloody feud with Albert for the rest of his life, and Albert eventually became margrave.

In 1128, Udo married Mathilde, the daughter of Herman I, Count of Winzenburg. The precise identity of her mother remains unknown, but she was likely either Hedwig of Assel-Woltingerode or Hedwig of Carniola-Istria. Mathilde was the half-sister of Albert the Bear, the arch-enemy of her husband. Further complicating the family relations, her brother Herman II was the third husband of Danish queen Lutgard of Salzwedel, daughter of Rudolf I and therefore sister of Udo.

On March 15, 1130, Udo was murdered by Albert’s servants near Aschersleben. He left no male heir and was succeeded as margrave by Conrad of Plötzkau.

== Sources ==
- Krause, Karl Ernst Hermann, Lothar Udo II. und das Stader Grafenhaus. In: Allgemeine Deutsche Biographie. Band 19, Duncker & Humblot, Leipzig, 1884
