= Scivias =

1151–1152 work by Hildegard von Bingen

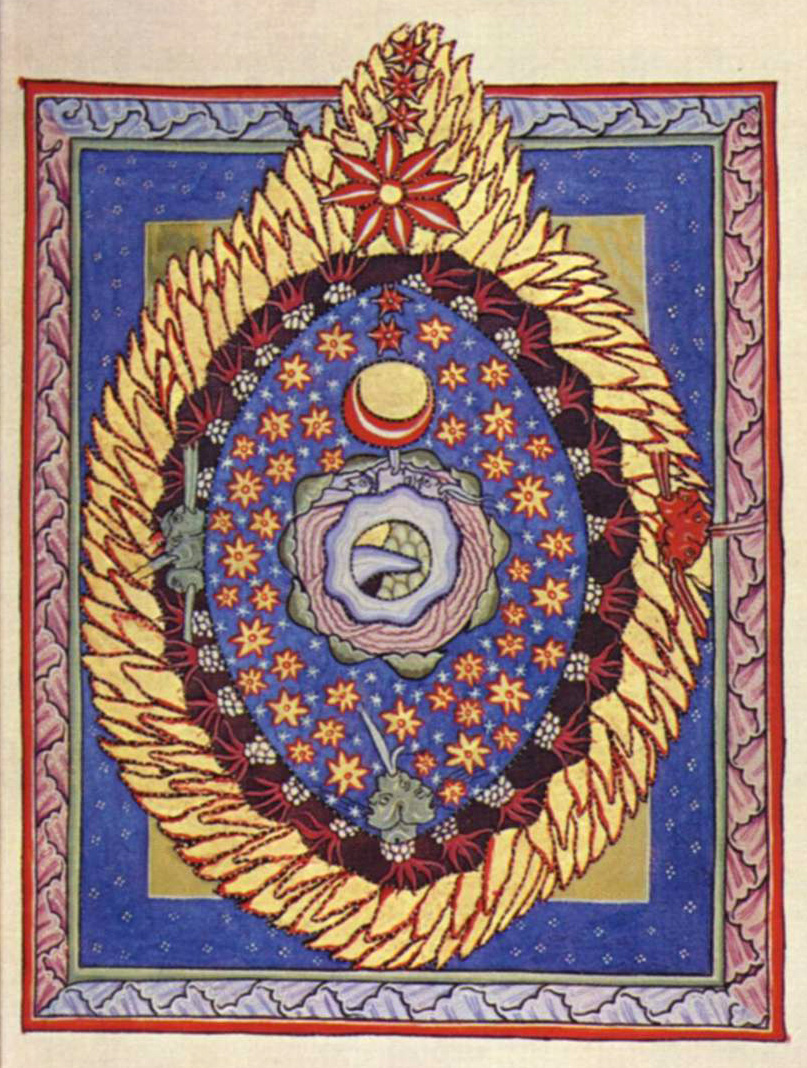
Illumination accompanying the third vision of Part I of Scivias

Scivias is an illustrated work by Hildegard von Bingen, completed in 1151 or 1152, describing 26 religious visions she experienced. It is the first of three works that she wrote describing her visions, the others being Liber vitae meritorum and De operatione Dei (also known as Liber divinorum operum). The title comes from the Latin phrase Sci vias Domini ('Know the Ways of the Lord'). The book is illustrated by 35 miniature illustrations, more than that are included in her two later books of visions.

The work is divided into three parts, reflecting the Trinity. The first and second parts are approximately equal in length, while the third is as long as the other two together. The first part includes a preface describing how she was commanded to write the work, and includes six visions dealing with themes of creation and the Fall. The second part consists of seven visions and deals with salvation through Jesus Christ, the Church, and the sacraments. The third part, with thirteen visions, is about the coming kingdom of God, through sanctification, and increased tension between good and evil. The final vision includes 14 songs, plus a portion of the music drama which was later published as the Ordo Virtutum. In each vision, she first described what she saw, and then recorded explanations she heard, which she believed to be the "voice of heaven."

== Manuscripts and editions ==
Scivias survives in ten medieval manuscripts, two of them lost in modern times. The most esteemed of these was the well-preserved Rupertsberg manuscript, prepared under her immediate supervision or that of her immediate tradition, being made around the time of her death. It resided in the Wiesbaden Hessische Landesbibliothek until World War II, when it was taken to Dresden for safekeeping, and lost. The original manuscript was 12.8 by 9.25 inches (32.512 by 23.495 cm), and in 235 parchment pages with double columns. A faithful illuminated copy was made at the Hildegard Abbey in Eibingen in 1927-1933, which is the source of the color reproductions now available. Other copies are in the Biblioteca Vaticana (made in Rupertsberg), Heidelberg (12th century), Oxford (12 or 13th century), Trier (1487), and elsewhere.

The first modern edition of Scivias, translated into German, was published in 1928 by Sister Maura Böckeler of the Hildegard Abbey. A critical edition was completed in 1978 by Adelgundis Führkötter and Angela Carlevaris of the Hildegard Abbey. Of her books, it is the one most widely available to modern audiences in translations, sometimes abridged.

== Writing process ==
According to Hildegard herself in the preface to the Scivias, in 1141 (when she was 42) God in a vision ordered her to share her religious visions. At this time she had been the superior of the women's community at Disibodenberg for five years. She had been experiencing such visions from the age of five, but had only confided in the monk Volmar and her deceased superior Jutta. She felt insecure about her writing, out of humility or fear, and when she became ill, which she believed was punishment from God for her hesitancy. Volmar insisted that she write her visions down, and he and one of her nuns, Richardis von Stade, assisted in the writing of the work. She received permission to write the work from the Abbot Kuno at Disibodenberg. She also wrote to Bernard of Clairvaux in 1146 for advice, and he suggested the visions were indeed from God, and demurred to interfere with His orders. Perhaps the length of time it took her to decide to write the visions, despite punishment from God and the encouragement of other religious figures, indicates how frightening she found them.

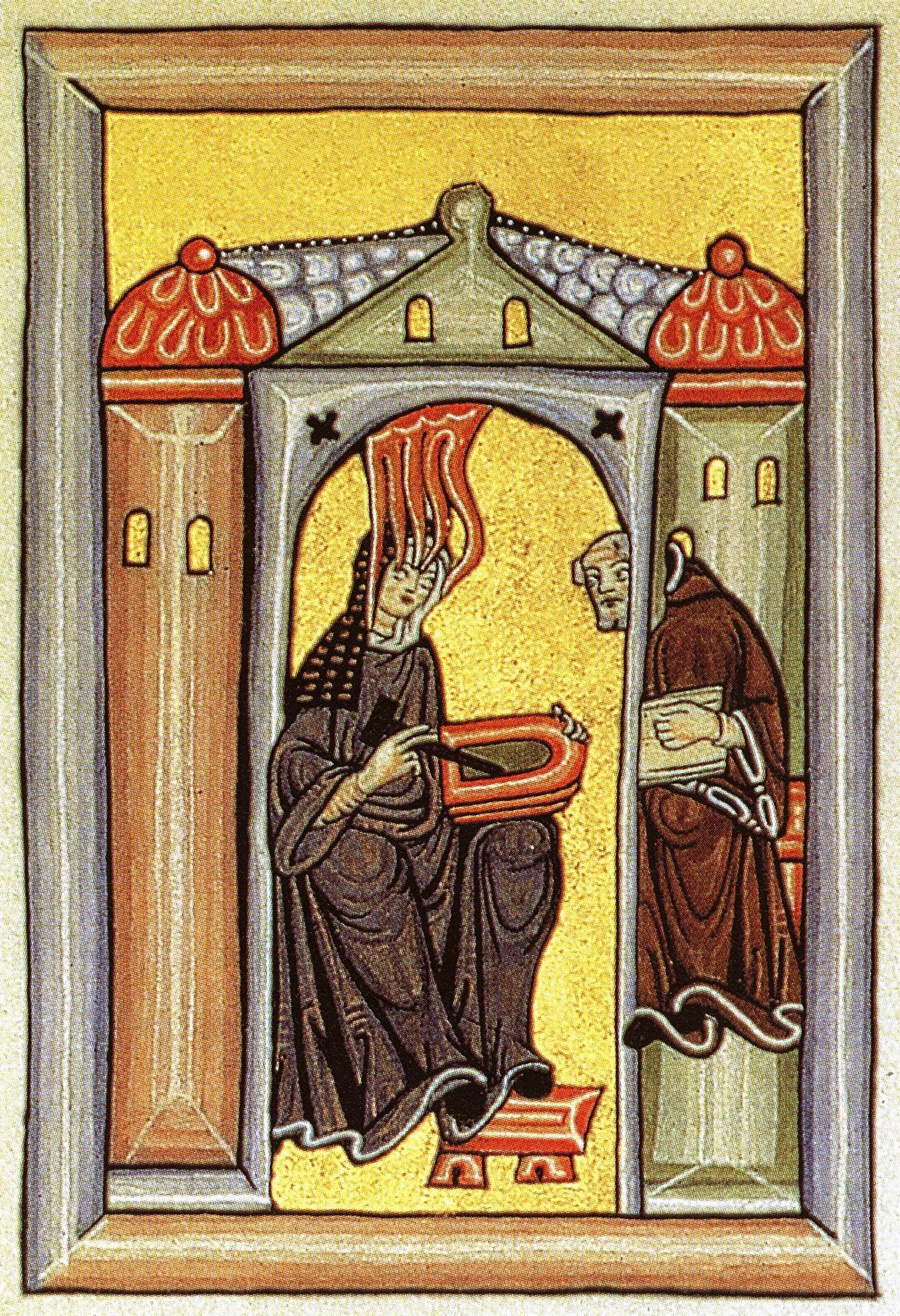
Frontispiece of Scivias, showing Hildegard receiving a vision, dictating to Volmar, and sketching on a wax tablet

A delegation from Disibodenberg took a copy of some writings she had made to the Synod of Trier (November 1147 – February 1148), and they were read aloud at the synod. Pope Eugene III granted papal approval to the writings, and authorized Hildegard to publish everything she received in visions. It is unclear whether the illustrations that accompany the text were shown at Trier. In 1148, she received a vision that called her to move her convent to Rupertsberg. She moved there in 1150, and soon afterward completed Scivias (in 1151 or 1152).

It is unclear what her role was in the illumination of the manuscript, and scholars have assigned her every role from being uninvolved, to directing others to create them, to being their direct creator. In an illustration included as a frontispiece, Hildegard is shown sketching on a wax tablet while dictating a vision to Volmar. According to Madeline Caviness, she may have sketched the outlines of her visions at their time, perhaps dictating their content simultaneously, and they were subsequently detailed.

== Structure ==
At the beginning and end of each of the three sections of the work, there is a structural marker which indicates its prophetic nature. In addition, at the end of each vision is a concluding sentence, which is different for each of the three sections. The conclusion of each vision is also marked by a sentence that becomes stereotypical. For the visions in section one, the sentence is "I heard again the voice from heaven speaking to me"; in section two "And again I heard a voice from the heavenly heights speaking to me"; and in section three "And I heard that light who sat on the throne speaking."

The fourteen songs included in the final vision are all antiphons and responsories. The lyrics are written in a cryptic style, resembling the trobar clus of contemporary troubadours. The songs are arranged hierarchically by subject in pairs, with two for the Virgin Mary, two for the angels, and two each for five categories of saints: patriarchs and prophets, apostles, martyrs, confessors, and virgins.

The relationship between the visions and the musical and dramatic content at the end is unclear. According to Margot Fassler, the visionary content, the songs and the play were designed by Hildegard to support an educational program. If this interpretation is correct, then this is the only such program that survives from the Middle Ages.

== Contents ==
The division of the book follows, based largely on the illuminations, using the titles assigned each vision by Adelgundis Führkötter, the editor of the critical edition (the original text does not give titles). Where multiple titles are given, multiple illuminations are provided. Each vision is followed by commentary divided into sections (given functional titles in the original manuscripts), the number of which is designated in parentheses.

- Foreword
- Part I
  1. God, the Light-Giver and Humanity (6)
  2. The Fall (33)
  3. God, Cosmos, and Humanity (31)
  4. Humanity and Life (32)
  5. Synagogue (8)
  6. The Choirs of Angels (12)

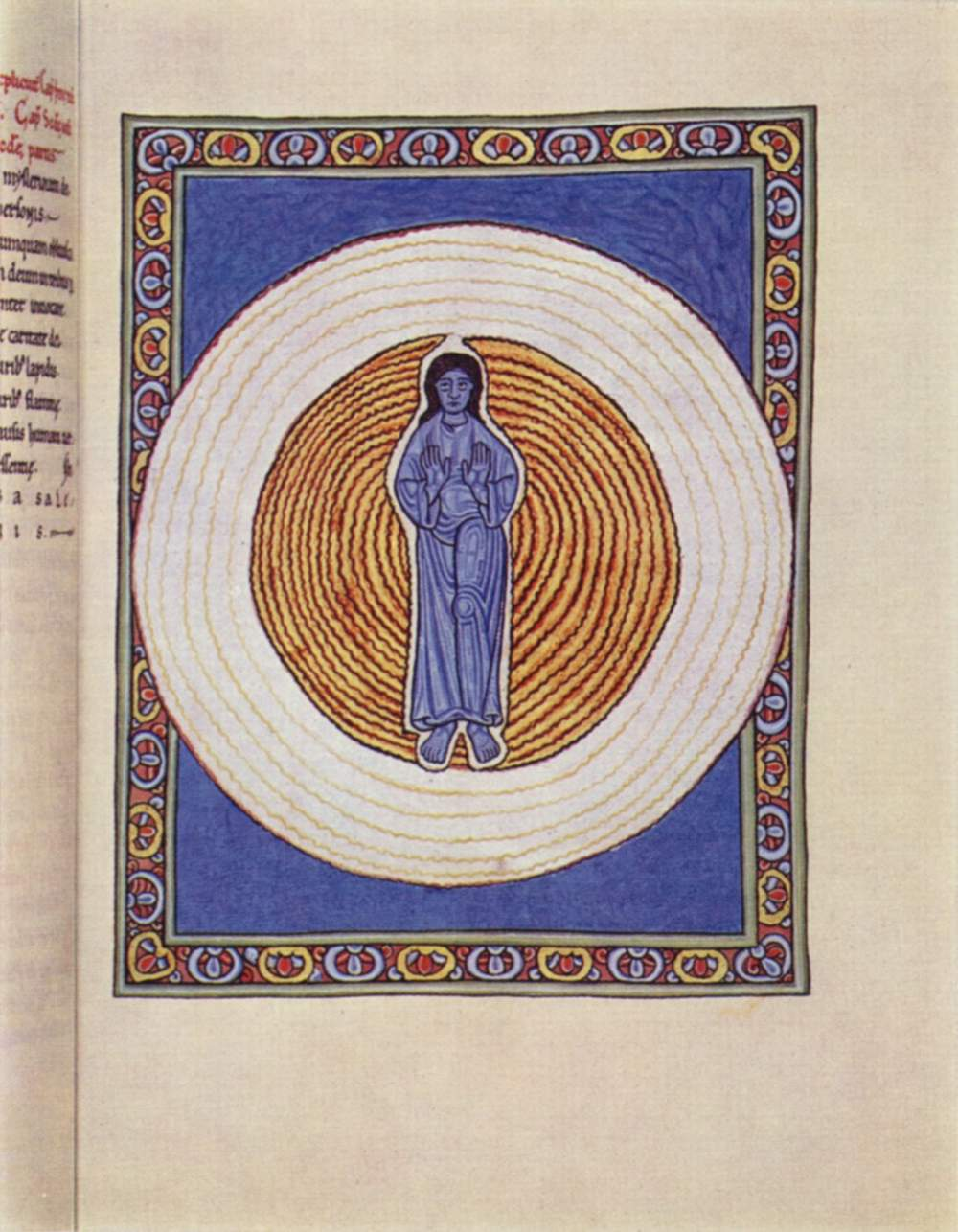
Illumination accompanying the second vision of Part II

- Part II
  1. The Saviour (17)
  2. The Triune God (9)
  3. The Church as Mother of Believers – The Baptism (37)
  4. Anointed with Virtue – The Confirmation (14)
  5. The Hierarchy of the Church (60)
  6. The Sacrifice of Christ and the Church; Continuation of the Mystery in the Partaking of the Sacrifice (102)
  7. Humanity's Fight Against Evil; The Tempter (25)
- Part III
  1. The Omnipotent; The Extinguished Stars (18)
  2. The Building (28)
  3. The Tower of Preparation; The Divine Virtues in the Tower of Preparation (13)
  4. The Pillar of the Word of God; The Knowledge of God (22)
  5. The Zeal of God (33)
  6. The Triple Wall (35)
  7. The Pillar of the Trinity (11)
  8. The Pillar of the Humanity of the Savior (25)
  9. The Tower of the Church (29)
  10. The Son of Man (32)
  11. The End of Time (42)
  12. The Day of the Great Revelation; The New Heaven and the New Earth (16)
  13. Praise of the Holy (16)

== Analysis ==
Hildegard is interpreted to be within the prophetic tradition of the Old Testament, using formulaic expressions in the text. Like those prophets, Hildegard was politically and socially engaged and offered frequent moral exhortations and directives. Scivias can be seen as essentially a work of instruction and direction, to achieve salvation. Theological questions arise and are dealt with but are usually considered using reasoning by analogy (especially pictorial analogy), rather than logic or dialectic.

Hildegard focuses on a concept she called viriditas, which she considered an attribute of the divine nature. The word is often translated in different ways, such as freshness, vitality, fecundity, fruitfulness, verdure, or growth. It is used as a metaphor of physical and spiritual health.

Some authors, such as Charles Singer, have suggested that the characteristics of the descriptions of the visions and the illustrations, such as bright lights and auras, imply they may have been caused by scintillating scotoma, a migraine condition. Oliver Sacks, in his book Migraine, called her visions "indisputably migrainous," but stated that this does not invalidate her visions, because it is what one does with a psychological condition that is important. The resemblance of the illuminations to typical symptoms of migraine attacks, especially in cases where it is not precisely described in the text, is one of the stronger arguments that Hildegard herself was directly involved in their creation.

It has also been suggested that the visions may have been due to hallucinogenic components present in ergot, common in that area of the Rhineland, at certain times of the year.

== Influence ==
In Hildegard's day, Scivias was her best-known work. Scivias was used as a model by Elizabeth of Schönau for her work Liber viarum Dei. Elizabeth, like Hildegard, experienced visions, and was encouraged by Hildegard to publish them.

Ordo Virtutum is the earliest known morality play, a genre previously believed to have started in the 14th century.

== Editions ==
- (critical edition) Adelgundis Führkötter and Angela Carlevaris, eds. Hildegardis Scivias. Turnhout: Brepols, 1978. LX, 917 pp., with 35 plates in six colors and three black-and-white plates. Corpus Christianorum. Continuatio Mediaevalis, vols. 43 and 43A.
- (German translation) Maura Böckeler. Wisse die Wege. Scivias. Salzburg: Otto Müller, 1954.
- (English translation) Bruce Hozeski. Scivias. Santa Fe: Bear and Company, 1986.
- (English translation) Columba Hart and Jane Bishop. Scivias. New York: Paulist Classics of Western Spirituality, 1990.
- (abridged English translation) Bruce Hozeski. Hildegard von Bingen's Mystical Visions. Santa Fe: Bear and Company, 1995.
- (edition and Dutch translation) Mieke Kock-Rademakers. Scivias – Ken de wegen, three volumes. Hilversum: Verloren, 2015-.
