= Richgard von Sponheim =

Richgard of Sponheim, or Richardis (died 1151), was the wife of Rudolf I of Stade, Margrave of the Nordmark, and mother of Udo IV, Rudolf II, Margrave of the Nordmark, Archbishop Hartwig of Magdeburg, Lutgard of Salzwedel, and Richardis von Stade.

== Life ==
Richardis was the daughter of Hermann von Spanheim, later Burgrave of Magdeburg; her mother is unknown.

In 1124, she, along with her husband and her relative Meginhard I, Count of Sponheim, endowed estates for the new Sponheim Monastery. After her husband's death at the end of that year, she lived on estates in the vicinity of Magdeburg and Jerichow, Saxony, where she raised her young son, Hartwig. Richgard died in 1151.

Prior to the removal of her daughter Richardis from the monastery at Disibodenberg to become Abbess at Bassum, Hildegard of Bingen wrote to Richgard pleading to have Richardis allowed to stay at Disibodenberg.

== Descendants ==
The following children were born from her marriage to Rudolf:

- Udo IV, Margrave of the Nordmark and Count of Stade (as Udo V)
- Rudolf II, Margrave of the Nordmark and Count of Stade
- Hartwig, Count of Stade and Archbishop of Bremen
- Lutgard of Salzwedel, married to Frederick II, Count of Sommerschenburg, Herman II, Count of Winzenburg, and Eric III, King of Denmark
- Richardis von Stade, Abbess at Bassum and close confidante of Saint Hildegard von Bingen.

== Bibliography ==
- Friedrich Hausmann: Die Grafen zu Ortenburg und ihre Vorfahren im Mannesstamm, die Spanheimer in Kärnten, Sachsen und Bayern, sowie deren Nebenlinien, (tr. "The Counts of Ortenburg and their male-line ancestors, the Spanheim family in Carinthia, Saxony, and Bavaria, as well as their collateral lines"), published in: Ostbairische Grenzmarken – Passauer Jahrbuch für Geschichte, Kunst und Volkskunde, No. 36, Passau 1994 (pp. 9–62).
