= Herman I of Winzenburg =

Herman I, Count of Winzenburg
- Born: c. 1083; Formbach
- Died: 1137 or 1138; Segeberg
- Noble family: House of Formbach
- Spouses: A Countess of Everstein; Either Hedwig of Assel-Woltingerode or Hedwig of Carniola-Istria
- Issue Detail: Sophie of Winzenburg; Conrad; Herman II, Count of Winzenburg
- Father: Meginhard IV of Formbach
- Mother: Matilda of Reinhausen

Herman I, Count of Winzenburg (also known as Herman of Windberg; c. 1083 – 1137 or 1138) was count of Formbach and Radelberg. From 1109 to 1130, he was also Count of Winzenburg and from 1122 to 1138, he was Count of Reinhausen. He was also Landgrave of Thuringia from 1111 to 1130 and Margrave of Meissen from 1124 to 1130. And finally, he was high bailiff of Corvey Abbey.

He was a son of Count Meginhard IV of Formbach, and his wife Matilda, a daughter of Count Elli II of Reinhausen.

At a young age, he moved in with his maternal uncle, Bishop Udo of Hildesheim. In Hildesheim, he attended the cathedral school. At the age of sixteen, he travelled with his uncle to Mainz, to be presented to the emperor on 9 November 1099.

He was the first member of the family to call himself of Winzenburg, after Winzenburg Castle, southeast of Alfeld, which he received as a fief from his uncle Udo.

He was an advisor of Emperor Henry V and became very powerful during Henry's reign. In 1109, Henry V sent him to Rome, as a member of a diplomatic mission. In 1111 or 1112, he became the first Landgrave of Thuringia, after it was split off from the Duchy of Saxony.

He fulfilled his obligations as bailiff of Corvey Abbey from a distance. When the sons of Count Widekind I of Schwalenberg attacked the abbey, Herman remained inactive.

In the Investiture Controversy, he sided with the Pope. This meant that he had to flee to the area where he was born, on the upper Inn. He made a large donation to the Göttweig Abbey.

In 1122, his uncle Herman III of Reinhausen died in Formbach, and thereby the Counts of Reinhausen died out in the male line. As his closest relative, Herman I inherited Reinhausen and he also became bailiff of Reinhausen Abbey, which his maternal ancestors had founded. Later that year, his father died, and Herman I inherited Windberg and Formbach as well. He also became Count of the Leinegau.

In 1130, he came into conflict with Burchard I of Loccum, an advisor of Emperor Lothair III, about the construction of Burchard's castle. Herman I had Burchard assassinated on a cemetery. On 18 August 1130, during the Diet of Quedlinburg, Herman was outlawed for this murder, and all his fiefs were revoked:

- The Landgraviate of Thuringia was given to Louis VII of Bavaria.
- The Margraviate of Meissen was given in its entirety to Conrad of Wettin.
- Winzenburg castle and the associated manors fell back to the Bishopric of Hildesheim, because these were fiefs from Hildesheim.

Herman I and his sons Herman II and Henry retreated to Winzenburg Castle, and defended it for several months against the army the Emperor had sent. They surrendered on 31 December 1130. Herman I was arrested and brought the Blankenburg. He was then held in custody in the Rhineland for several years. In 1134, he was released and charged with defensive duties in Holstein. He was commander of Segeberg fortress, where he died in 1137 or 1138. His death was mentioned in a document about the family that founded Reinhausen Abbey, written by abbott Reinhard sometime between 1153 and 1156. Reinhard himself died on 7 May 1156 and was buried in the church of Reinhausen Abbey. The document can be found in the State Archive in Hanover, document nr. 2 in the Reinhausen Abbey file.

== Marriage and issue ==
Herman married twice. His first wife was a countess of Everstein, whose name has not been preserved. With her, he had two children:

- Sophie (c. 1105 – 25 March 1160), married Albert the Bear, Margrave of Brandenburg
- Conrad

His second wife was either Hedwig of Assel-Woltingerode or Hedwig of Carniola-Istria, the niece of Count Ulrich II of Weimar-Orlamünde (d. 1112). With her, he had four more children:

- Beatrix, abbess of Quedlinburg (d. 2 April 1160)
- Herman II (c. 1110 – 20 or 30 January 1152)
- Matilda (also known as Jutta) (d. 22 May 1155), married in 1128 to Count Udo IV of Stade, Margrave of the Nordmark
- Henry (c. 1110-1115 – 1146), Count of Assel
