= Lutgard of Salzwedel =

Queen of Denmark from 1144 to 1146

Queen consort of Denmark
- Tenure: 1144–1146
- Born: c. 1110
- Died: 1152; Winzenburg
- Spouse: (1) Frederick II of Sommerschenburg (2) Eric III of Denmark (3) Herman II, Count of Winzenburg
- House: House of Udonen
- Father: Rudolf I, Count of Stade
- Mother: Richardis, Countess of Sponheim

Lutgard of Salzwedel or Liutgard/Luitgard of Stade, (b. c. 1110, murdered 1152) was Queen of Denmark as the wife of King Eric III.

== Life ==
Lutgard was born to Richardis, Countess of Sponheim-Lavanttal, and Count Rudolf I of Stade and Ditmarsh (d. 1124), Margrave of the Northern March, seated in Salzwedel. Lutgard's paternal grandfather was Margrave Lothair Udo II (of the Udonids, German: Udonen). After the death of her father she lived at her mother's estates near Jerichow. Married to her uncle Frederick II, Count of Sommerschenburg (c. 1095 – 19 May 1162), Count Palatine of Saxony as Frederick VI (since 1120), she had four children with him, but was forced to divorce him - on the grounds of prohibited degree of relation - by 1142.

Her brother Hartwig, Count of Stade, provost at Bremen Cathedral since 1143, married her to Eric of Denmark in 1143 or 1144. With the death of her elder, childless brother Count Rudolf II of Stade and Freckleben in 1144, Lutgard and her children became the eventual heirs of the County of Stade, since her younger, inheriting brother, Hartwig, was childless too. However, in 1148 Hartwig stipulated with the cathedral chapter his election as Archbishop of Bremen in return for his bequest of the county to the archdiocese on his death, thus disinheriting Lutgard's children. As queen, she was criticized for being promiscuous and for influencing her spouse to waste money. She separated from her spouse after she was accused of adultery and exiled to the Holy Roman Empire.

As a widow, she became the second wife of the widowed Count Herman II of Winzenburg-Northeim in 1148, and had three more daughters with him. Ministeriales of Bernard of Rothenburg, Bishop of Hildesheim, eventually at his instigation, murdered Count Herman, who was violent and ambitious to seize further territories, and the pregnant Lutgard in Winzenburg in the night between 29 and 30 January 1152. The murderers further robbed their treasury of 6,000 pound in silver.

== Issue ==
With Frederick II of Sommerschenburg she had four children:

- Albert (Adalbert), Count Palatine of Sommerschenburg (ca. 1130–15 January or 17 March 1179)
- Adelheid (d. 1 May 1184), Princess-Abbess of Gandersheim Abbey (1152/53–1184) and Quedlinburg Abbey (1161–1184)
- Sophia (d. 1189 or 1190), married (1) with Henry I, Count of Wettin (27 February 1142 – 30 August 1181), brother of the next Danish queen consort Adela of Meissen and son of their father Margrave Conrad the Great; (2) with Hermann I, Landgrave of Thuringia
- Dietrich, Count Palatine of Sommerschenburg, guardian of his nephew Henry II, Count of Wettin, son of Sophia and Henry I of Wettin

With Hermann II of Winzenburg-Northeim she had the following three daughters:

- Daughter (1149– before 1204), married (1) in 1170 Henry III, Count of Schwarzburg (d. 26 July 1184), and (2) Ulrich I, Count of Wettin (ca. 1170–28 September 1206), son of Sophia and Henry I of Wettin
- Daughter (b. 1150), in 1166 married Buris/Burits Henriksen (likely 1130–1167, murdered), Earl of Jutland (since 1162), a son of Ingrid Ragnvaldsdotter and Henry Sweynson (Henrik Skadelår)
- Hedwig (b. 1151), Provostress of Gandersheim Abbey

== Notes ==
Liutgard of Stade House of Udonen Born: circa 1110 Died: 29 or 30 January 1152
| Preceded by Malmfred | Queen consort of Denmark; 1144–1146 | Succeeded by Adela of Meissen |
