= Conrad von Plötzkau, Margrave of the Nordmark =

Conrad
- Margrave of the Nordmark and Count of Plötzkau
- Tenure: 1130 – 1132
- Died: 1132
- Buried: Hecklingen Monastery, Hecklingen, Duchy of Saxony
- Noble family: Walbeck
- Father: Helperich von Plötzkau, Margrave of the Nordmark
- Mother: Adele of Northeim

Conrad (died 1132), Margrave of the Nordmark and Count of Plötzkau, son of Helperich, Margrave of the Nordmark, and Adele, daughter of Kuno of Northeim and Kunigunde of Weimar-Orlamünde. Conrad, called the Saxon flower, was born in Monza, Italy.

Conrad became Margrave of Nordmark upon the death of Udo IV, who died without a male heir. At this point in time, the position of margrave had no real power. Nevertheless, Conrad fought with Emperor Lothair II in his Italian campaign (Italienkriegszug) of 1132, and, on 25 December 1132, he was struck by an arrow in a battle with the Normans. He died several days later and was buried in the Hecklingen Monastery.

Conrad was succeeded by the traditional heir to the margraviate, Rudolf II, son of Rudolf I.

== Sources ==
- Heinemann, Otto von, "Konrad von Plötzkau". In: Allgemeine Deutsche Biographie, Volume 16, 1182
- Krause, Karl Ernst Hermann, Lothar Udo II. und das Stader Grafenhaus. In: Allgemeine Deutsche Biographie. Volume 19, Duncker & Humblot, Leipzig, 1884
