= Henry II, Margrave of the Nordmark =

Count of Stade

Henry II
- Margrave of the Nordmark and Count of Stade
- Tenure: 1114 – 1128
- Born: 1102
- Died: 4 December 1128 (aged 25–26)
- Noble family: Udonids
- Spouse: Adelaide of Ballenstedt
- Father: Lothair Udo III, Margrave of the Nordmark
- Mother: Irmgard of Plötzkau

Henry II (1102 – 4 December 1128), Margrave of the Nordmark, also Count of Stade (as Henry IV), son of Lothair Udo III, Margrave of the Nordmark, and Irmgard, daughter of Dietrich, Count of Plötzkau, and Mathilde von Walbeck.

Henry assumed the title of Margrave of the Nordmark in 1114 from Helperich of Plötzkau, who was appointed margrave until Henry came of age. The previous margrave in this dynasty was Henry's uncle Rudolf I, who was also his guardian. Rudolf was deposed by Emperor Henry V because of conspiracy against the crown, and was replaced by Helperich as an interim measure. Henry assumed the titles of Count of Stade and Margrave of the Nordmark in 1114.

Henry was married to Adelaide of Ballenstedt, a daughter of Otto, Count of Ballenstedt, and Eilika of Saxony. Adelaide was therefore the sister of Albert the Bear. There are no known children as a result of this union. Henry was succeeded as margrave by the son of Helperich, Conrad of Plötzkau.

== Sources ==
- Krause, Karl Ernst Hermann, Lothar Udo II. und das Stader Grafenhaus. In: Allgemeine Deutsche Biographie. Band 19, Duncker & Humblot, Leipzig, 1884
