= Hakon Sunnivasson =

Danish nobleman

Hakon Sunnivasson (Danish: Hakon Jyde, "from Jutland") (fl. 1131) was a Danish nobleman and the father of King Eric III of Denmark.

== Biography ==
Hakon was the son of a Danish nobleman. His mother, Sunniva, was the daughter of Ragnhild Magnusdatter a daughter of Norwegian King Magnus the Good. Hakon married Ragnhild, daughter of King Eric I of Denmark. According to Saxo Grammaticus, he had avenged the murder of Eric's brother Bjørn, and he may have served as the king's jarl in the border region. In 1131, he was initially part of the conspiracy against his brother-in-law Canute Lavard, but he withdrew when the plans turned towards murder. Because he was bound by oath, he could not warn Canute.
