= Ruthard of Mainz =

Archbishop of Mainz from 1089 to 1109

Ruthard
- Archbishop of Mainz
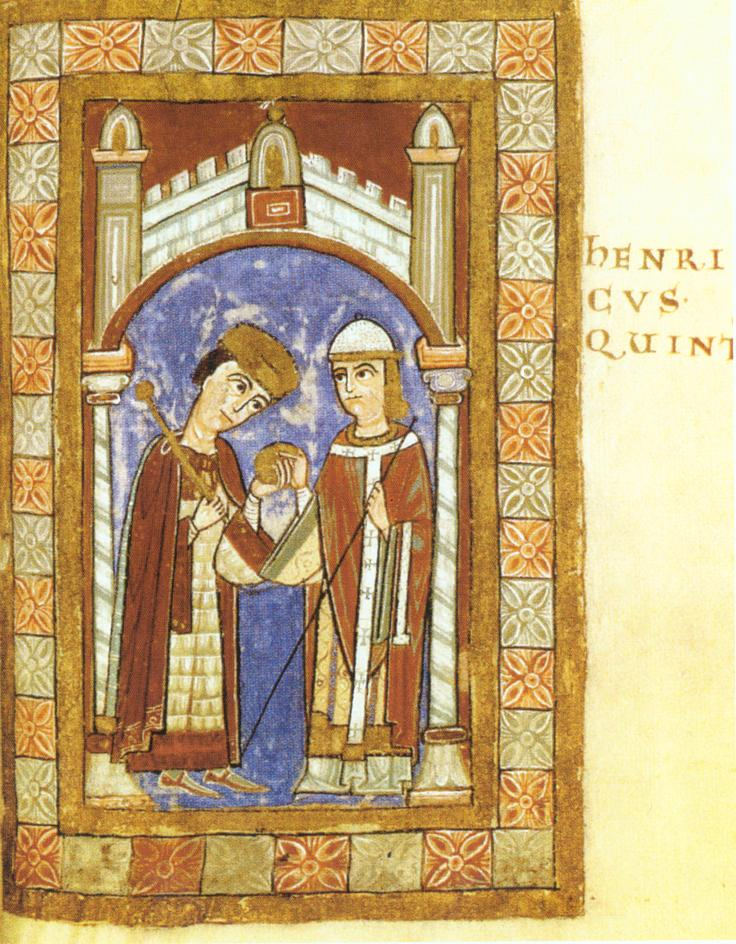
- Archbishop Ruthard of Mainz hands over the Sphaira to Henry V.
- Church: Catholic Church
- Diocese: Electorate of Mainz
- In office: 1089–1109
- Predecessor: Wezilo (1084—1088)
- Successor: Adalbert (1111—1137)

Personal details
- Died: 1109

Ruthard (died 1109) was Archbishop of Mainz from 1089 to 1109, and a leading opponent of the Emperor Henry IV and his antipope Clement III (Wibert of Ravenna). He spent nearly eight years in exile because of his opposition, and played a part in the successful revolt of Henry V against his father.

== Archbishop ==
Ruthard was appointed archbishop of Mainz on 25 July 1089, the same day that Herimann was appointed archbishop of Cologne and Erimann archbishop of Würzburg.

In March 1094, a general synod of the bishops and princes of the Holy Roman Empire met in Mainz. The emperor Henry IV was in Lombardy at the time. Duke Bretislav of Bohemia had sent to the assembly two bishops-elect, Cosmas of Prague and Andrew of Olmütz, to be presented to Archbishop Ruthard for consecration. After the synod determined that their appointments had been approved by the emperor, it gave permission to Ruthard to proceed. On 12 March 1094, the archbishop consecrated the two bishops.

In 1096, Ruthard opposed violence against the Jews arising from the First Crusade. He attempted to deflect an attack on Mainz by Count Emicho, who was beset by messianic and apocalyptic fantasies. According to the Saxon Annals, the Rheinland Jews fled with their valuables to Archbishop Ruthard for aid and defense. His forces, however, were inadequate to protecting the city. After a two-day stand-off, on 27 May Emicho broke into the city, and carried general slaughter even into the episcopal palace, where every Jew was killed, and most of the city was burned. Reports of deaths vary from 700 to 1300.

== Exile ==
At a diet held in Hardenburg (85 km south of Mainz) in 1098, Archbishop Ruthard was accused by some courtiers before Emperor Henry IV, whom he opposed in the Investiture Conflict, of appropriating property of murdered Jews. Perceiving that he was losing the good will of the emperor, Ruthard departed from Mainz secretly at night, and headed into Thurungia, where he spent several years in exile. The antipope Clement III called Ruthard's actions thievery, in a letter of 29 July 1099 written to the Provost, clergy and people of Mainz. According to his information, Ruthard had taken a golden cup (calix) belonging to the church of Speyer, which he had obtained from the Jews, but denied the charge, but later when he was found out, he returned parts and promised to return the rest.

Archbishop Ruthard was summoned to the papal court of the Emperor Henry's antipope, Clement III, to answer charges of simony. When he failed to appear, after repeated summonses and warnings, he was excommunicated on 29 July 1099, and the Provost and people of Mainz were warned not to associate with him under pain of the interdict.

Since Ruthard was still in exile, when the diocese of Prague became vacant, the Emperor Henry IV sought to fill the seat. He obtained the cooperation of all the suffragan bishops of the ecclesiastical province of Mainz, and then had the (schismatic) papal legate, Cardinal Rupert (Robert), antipope Clement III's apocrisiarius, consecrate the candidate, Hermann, on 8 April 1100. Rupert was Bishop of Faenza.

In 1101, Archbishop Ruthard was living in Erfurt, where he consecrated two abbots.

== Restoration ==
His banishment was enforced until Henry IV's son, the young Henry V, who was in revolt from his father, made an attempt in June 1105 to seize Mainz from his father and restore Archbishop Ruthard. He was unsuccessful, but in late July or early August the old emperor requested his son to dismiss his army and come to Ingelheim to a colloquy, at which, among others, he wanted the archbishop of Mainz to be present.

In December the son, whose headquarters were at Mainz, captured the old emperor and imprisoned him. Henry IV abdicated on 31 December 1105. Henry V, having made satisfactory arrangements with the ecclesiastical authorities, suspended the remaining supporters of Clement III and his successors, and required them to undergo an examination by Pope Paschal II. Ruthard was restored to the archbishopric of Mainz in 1105, the eighth year of his exile. On 11 November 1105, Pope Paschal wrote him a letter, congratulating him on his restoration and blaming Henry IV for everything.

On 5 January 1106, the civil and ecclesiastical leaders of the Holy Roman Empire gathered at Mainz, and invested Henry V with the imperial regalia. Count Hamersten sent for the regalia, which were received by Archbishop Ruthard and the people with reverence. Rothard presented the regalia to Henry, saying that if he were not a good and just ruler of the empire and defender of the church, he should suffer what his father had suffered. The act was confirmed by the papal legates, Cardinal Richard of Albano and Bishop Gebhard of Konstanz, by the laying on of hands.

On 30 March 1107, Archbishop Ruthard and his suffragan bishops, with the consent of Henry V, consecrated Bishop Reinhard of Halberstadt. The archbishop was censured by Pope Paschal for having failed to appear at the council held at Troyes in May 1107.

In 1108, Archbishop Ruthard refounded Disibodenberg Abbey, at the place where Disibod had built a cell at the confluence of the rivers Nahe and Glan, by replacing the college of canons with regular monks.

Archbishop Ruthard died on 2 May 1109. His episcopal seat remained vacant for two years and four months.

== Bibliography ==
- Böhmer, Johann Friedrich (1877). Regesta archiepiscoporum maguntinensium: Regesten zur Geschichte der Mainzer Erzbischöfe von Bonifatius bis Uriel von Gemmingen 742?-1514 (in Latin). Vol. I. Innsbruck: Wagnerm. pp. 223–243.
- Salfeld, Siegmund (1898). Quellen zur Geschichte der Juden in Deutschland: Bd. Das Martyrologium des Nürnberger Memorbuches (in German). Vol. Band IV. L. Simion.
- Schaab, Carl Anton (1855). Moguntia. Diplomatische Geschichte der Juden zu Mainz und dessen Umgebung (in German). Mainz: Zabern.
