= Wezilo =

German archbishop

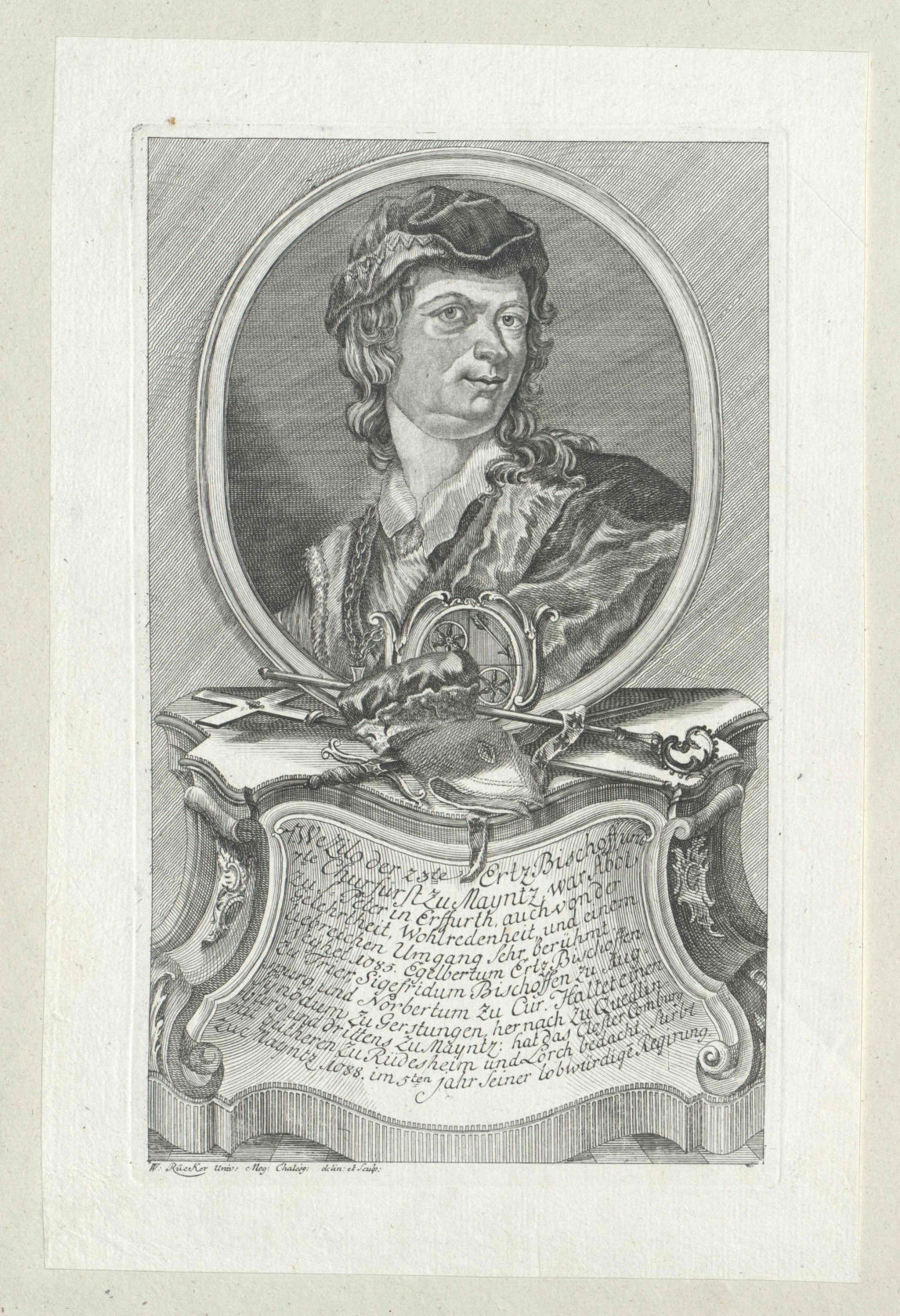

Archbishop of Mainz
- In office 1084–1088
- Preceded by: Siegfried I
- Succeeded by: Ruthard of Mainz

Personal details
- Died: 1088
- Resting place: Mainz Cathedral; 49°59′56″N 8°16′26″E
- Known for: Imperial support in the Investiture Controversy

Wezilo, died 1088, was Archbishop of Mainz from 1084 to 1088. He was a leading supporter of the Holy Roman Emperor Henry IV in the Investiture Controversy, and of antipope Clement III.

A priest in Halberstadt, Wezilo owed his promotion to the support of Henry IV. In 1085 he negotiated on behalf of the emperor with the papal legate, the future Pope Urban II, and in the same year he was convicted of simony and excommunicated by the pro-papal Synod of Quedlinburg.

In May 1087 the forces of Clement III and "the imperialist prefect Wezilo" forced Pope Victor III to retreat from Rome.

Wezilo was buried in Mainz Cathedral.

Catholic Church titles
Preceded by Siegfried I	Archbishop of Mainz; 1084–1088	Succeeded by Ruthard of Mainz
