= St. Canute's Abbey, Odense =

Benedictine monastery

Coordinates: 55°23′42″N 10°23′20″E

Saint Canute's Abbey, Odense (Danish: Skt Knuds Kloster) was a Benedictine monastery built to support the pilgrimage centre for the relics of the royal Danish martyr Saint Canute (died 1086), and was the successor to the priory of St. Mary and St. Alban, Denmark's earliest monastic house. Located in Odense, it was the island of Funen's most important medieval religious institution.

== History ==
St. Canute's Abbey was founded in connection with the pilgrimage site at the tomb of Saint Canute, otherwise King Canute IV of Denmark, in 1096 when his remains were translated into the new church, St. Canute's Cathedral. The land was perhaps originally that of the royal farm at Odense where Canute, his brother Prince Benedict and their followers stayed until they sought sanctuary in the nearby Benedictine priory church of St. Alban's where they were killed.

Twelve monks were brought by King Erik I Ejegod from Evesham Abbey in England to build and operate the new monastery in Denmark. They are credited with planting the first apple trees in Denmark in the abbey garden. Over the years the abbey acquired extensive land holdings on Funen making it a pre-eminent institution until the Reformation.

St. Canute's Cathedral formed the north side of the extensive abbey complex. Erik III Lam spent his last days in St. Canute's Abbey, where he died on 27 August 1146.

The abbey was sacked by the Wends in 1147, and the church and parts of the abbey were burned again in 1247 when Duke Abel "laid Odense in ashes". St. Canute's was rebuilt by 1301, and the Gothic Brick structure forms the core of the present St. Canute's Cathedral. Its form was unusual in that the shrine with the remains of Saint Canute and his brother, Prince Benedict, was placed beneath the high altar, so that pilgrims could visit it without interfering with the monks' services above them.

A cathedral school was first established in 1283. Later, additional schools were established with connections to other monastic houses in Odense. The most famous student was Hans Tausen, who later became one of Denmark's prominent Lutheran reformers.

The amount of income brought by pilgrims made it possible for the abbey to grow and expand its school and other works. In 1474 a quarrel between the Benedictine monks and Bishop Charles Rønnow resulted in the monks being driven from the abbey. They were able to return in 1489 upon orders from Pope Innocent VIII.

By the 1520s the winds of change were blowing in Denmark. Many Danes were weary of the economic burdens imposed by church tithes, fees and alms. Hans Tausen, a pupil of Martin Luther, and others returned to Denmark determined to free the country from the influence, beliefs, and institutions of its long Catholic past. Monastic houses, beginning with the Franciscans and Dominicans, were forced to close. In 1529 the last Catholic bishop of Odense resigned. The Count's Feud decided the question to the advantage of the Lutherans. By the time Denmark became officially Lutheran in 1536, the great monasteries had reverted to the crown. The income properties were sold off or given away to nobles to whom Christian III was indebted or in return for services. In 1537 the three grammar schools associated with the former monasteries were consolidated.

=== Later history ===
The abbey buildings were among the largest in Odense until the 1800s and were used for a variety of purposes both private and public. The buildings were modified many times and older sections demolished and other structures built in their places.

In 1913 a fire destroyed the entire abbey complex and additions made over several hundred years. It was quickly decided that it should be rebuilt as a reminder of the historic nature of the site, without much thought to how the new building was to be used. It was completed in 1919 and eventually housed the Odense city library and reading room, which it remained until 1976 when the library was relocated. The building on the site of St. Canute's Abbey now houses Skt Knuds Kloster Historiens Hus, a museum of the site's history.

== Sources ==
- Om Skt Knuds Kloster. Historiens Hus, Odense Kommune (in Danish)
