= Herman II of Winzenburg =

Herman II, Count of Winzenburg
- Born: Winzenburg Castle
- Died: 29 January 1152; Winzenburg Castle
- Noble family: House of Formbach
- Spouses: Elisabeth of Austria; Lutgard of Salzwedel
- Father: Herman I, Count of Winzenburg
- Mother: Hedwig

Herman II, Count of Winzenburg (died 29 January 1152) was a son of Herman I, Count of Winzenburg and his second wife, Hedwig. She was either Hedwig of Assel-Woltingerode or Hedwig of Carniola-Istria. Herman II succeeded his father as Count of Winzenburg, without achieving the dominant position his father had held. He was a loyal supporter of Archbishop Adalbert of Mainz for many years.

== Life ==
In 1122, Count Herman III of Reinhausen died, the brother of Herman II's paternal grandmother Matilda of Reinhausen. Herman II's father, Herman I was his legal successor as Count of Reinhausen, Count in the Leinegau, and advocatus of Reinhausen Abbey. After an imperial ban had been pronounced over his father in 1130, Herman II dwelled in the Rhineland, probably in Mainz.

From 1138, sought and gained the favour of King Conrad III of Germany, who saw them as a counterweight to the House of Welf. Herman II received Plesseburg castle in Paderborn as a fief, and styled himself Herman of Plesse.

Herman II was a vassal of the Archbishops of Mainz and an opponent of the houses of Welf and Northeim during the succession crisis of 1138. In 1140, he reconciled with Northeim. When the Northeim family died out with the death of Siegfried IV of Boyneburg on 27 April 1144, Herman II inherited the castles of Bomeneburg and Boyneburg. A short time later, Herman's younger brother Henry of Assel married Siegfried's widow Richenza. Herman, who possesses large funds, subsequently purchased a large part of Siegfried's inheritance, including Homburg castle, from Siegfried's other heirs. King Conrad III also invested the two brothers with some large imperial fiefs Siegfried IV had held, in order to tie them closer to the crown. They were also invested with the fiefs Siegfried had held from the Archbishop of Mainz and other prince-bishops. The fiefs they held from Mainz were especially important to them, as is evidenced by the fact that they ceded Reinhausen Abbey, their family's ancestral monastery, as well as the St. Blaise monastery in Northeim, which they had acquire earlier, to Mainz. After his defeat in the issue of the inheritance of Count Rudolph II of Stade, Conrad III could consider the division of the inheritance of the Boyneburg family as a success, since it made the Counts of Winzenburg into a strong counterweight to the House of Welf.

Herman II allied himself closely with Conrad III and even married Conrad's half-sister. After this marriage, he was considered an Imperial Prince. He witnessed many royal documents and always appeared in the closest royal entourage. He constantly quarreled with the bishops of Halberstadt and the abbots of Corvey Abbey over a fief they had withheld. He pressured the Bishop of Hildesheim to invest him with Winzenburg Castle, and the bishop did so on 8 May 1150. His possessions then stretched from the Leine river into northern Hesse and in to the Eichsfeld.

The ministeriales of the church in Hildesheim hated him, because of his domineering attitude. On the night of 29 January 1152, two of them broke into Winzenburg castle and killed Herman II and his pregnant wife with their swords. One of the murderers was beheaded in 1156; the other, Count Henry of Bodenburg, was defeated in a trial by battle and went into Neuwerk Monastery in Halle.

Henry the Lion, who descended from the Counts of Northeim via his mother, seized Homburg castle. On 13 October 1152, at a Diet in Würzburg, the emperor also granted Herman's possessions from the Reinhausen side to Herny the Lion; Henry's claim was based on the fact that Henry's maternal great-grandmother had been a sister of Herman's great-grandfather.

== Marriage and issue ==
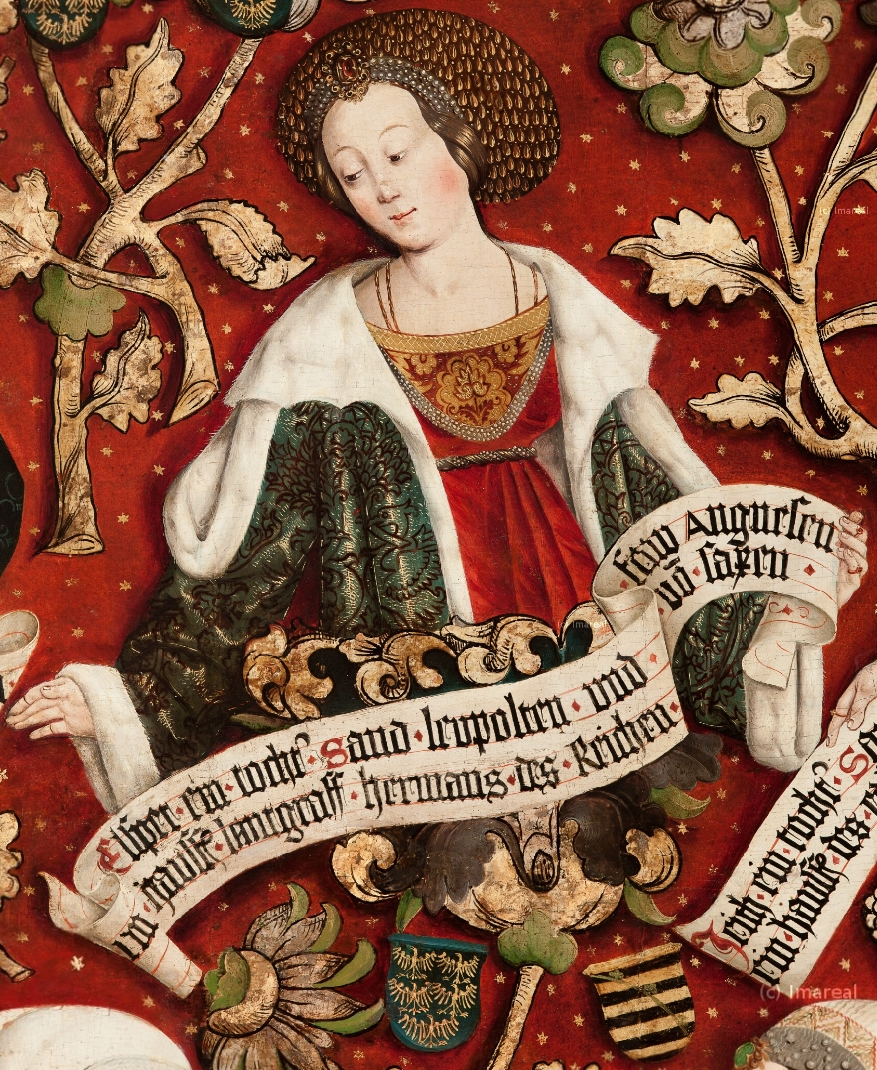
Elisabeth of Austria, wife of Herman of Winzburg

Herman II married twice:

- In 1142, he married Elisabeth of Austria (1124–1143; died in childbirth), a younger daughter of Margrave Leopold the Pious of Austria from the House of Babenberg. Elisabeth's mother was Agnes of Germany; she was a daughter of Emperor Henry IV and a half-sister of Conrad III.
- In 1148, he married Lutgard of Salzwedel (d. 1152), a daughter of Count Rudolf I of Stade, Margrave of the Northern March. She was the widow of King Eric III of Denmark and had previously divorced Count Palatine Frederick VI of Saxony. With Lutgard, he had:
  - a daughter (1149 – before 1204), married:
    1. Count Henry III of Schwarzburg (de) (d. 26 July 1184)
    2. Count Ulrich I of Wettin (d. 28 September 1206)
  - another daughter (b. 1150), married c. 1166 to Magnus Boris, Duke of Southern Jutland, a grandnephew of King Eric I of Denmark
  - Hedwig (b. 1151), provostess of Gandersheim Abbey

The inheritance rights of his alleged son Otto and the two daughters are unknown.
