= Lothair Udo III =

Margrave of Nordmark, Count of Stade

- Margrave of the Nordmark and Count of Stade
- Tenure: 1087 – 1106
- Born: 1070
- Died: 1106 (aged 35–36)
- Spouse: Irmgard von Plötzkau
- Issue: Henry II, Margrave of the Nordmark; Irmgard, Countess of Henneberg; Adelheid, Margravine of Meissen
- Father: Lothair Udo II, Margrave of the Nordmark
- Mother: Oda of Werl

Lothair Udo III (1070-1106), Margrave of the Nordmark and Count of Stade (as Lothair Udo IV), son of Lothair Udo II, Margrave of the Nordmark, and Oda of Werl, daughter of Herman III, Count of Werl, and Richenza of Swabia. Brother of his predecessor Henry I the Long.

Lothair Udo was betrothed to Eilika of Saxony, daughter of Magnus, Duke of Saxony, and Sophia of Hungary. However, his attention was diverted to the House of Helperich, towards Count Helperich's enticing sister Ermengardam. He married this woman, the count's sister Irmgard, daughter of Dietrich, Count of Plötzkau, and Mathilde von Walbeck, daughter of Conrad, Count of Walbeck. Eilika moved on and married Otto the Rich, Count of Ballenstedt, and was mother to Albert the Bear, the last Margrave of the Nordmark and first Margrave of Brandenburg. This provides an interesting twist in the history of the county of Stade.

Lothair Udo and Irmgard had four children:

- Henry II, Margrave of the Nordmark, also Count of Stade (as Henry IV)
- A daughter whose name is not known
- Irmgard von Stade, married Poppo IV, Count of Henneberg
- Adelheid von Stade, married Henry II, Margrave of Meissen.

Lothair Udo was succeeded by his brother Rudolf as margrave and count upon his death.
