= Helperich von Plötzkau, Margrave of the Nordmark =

Helperich
- Margrave of the Nordmark and Count of Plötzkau and Walbeck
- Tenure: 1112 – 1114
- Died: 1118
- Buried: Hecklingen Monastery, Hecklingen, Duchy of Saxony
- Spouse: Adele of Northeim (m. 1106)
- Issue: Bernhard, Count of Plötzkau; Conrad, Margrave of the Nordmark; Irmgard, Abbess of Hecklingen; Mathilde of Plötzkau
- Father: Dietrich, Count of Plötzkau
- Mother: Mathilde of Walbeck

Helperich (Helferich) (d. 1118), Count of Plötzkau and Walbeck, and Margrave of the Nordmark, son of Dietrich, Count of Plötzkau, and Mathilde von Walbeck, daughter of Conrad, Count of Walbeck, and Adelheid of Bavaria. The count's sister Irmgard was married to Lothair Udo III, Margrave of the Nordmark, and was the mother of Helperich's successor in ruling the margraviate, Henry II.

Helperich inherited the title Count of Plötzkau upon his father’s death and the title Count of Walbeck from his mother, although this title was mostly ceremonial at this point. In 1112, Emperor Henry V deposed Rudolf I as Margrave of the Nordmark because of conspiracy against the crown in his alliance with Lothair of Supplinburg, then Duke of Saxony (and later Holy Roman Emperor). The margraviate was given to Helperich as an interim measure until Henry II, nephew of Rudolf and heir to the title, was of age.

In 1106, Helperich married Adele, daughter of Kuno of Northeim and Kunigunde of Weimar-Orlamünde, widow of Dietrich III, Count of Katlenburg. Helperich and Adele had four children:

- Bernhard (d. 1147), Count of Plötzkau
- Conrad, Margrave of the Nordmark
- Irmgard, Abbess of Hecklingen
- Mathilde.

Halperich died in 1118 and was buried at the Hecklingen Monastery. Upon his death, he was succeeded as Count of Plötzkau by his son Bernhard. Henry II assumed the role of Margrave of the Nordmark in 1114.
