= Lothair Udo II =

Count of Stade, Margrave of Nordmark

- Margrave of the Nordmark and Count of Stade
- Born: c. 1025
- Died: 1082 (aged 56–57)
- Family: Udonids
- Spouse: Oda of Werl
- Issue: Henry I, Margrave of the Nordmark; Lothair Udo III, Margrave of the Nordmark; Rudolf I, Margrave of the Nordmark; Siegfried of Stade; Adelheid, Countess of Schauenburg and Thuringia
- Father: Lothair Udo I, Margrave of the Nordmark
- Mother: Adelheid of Rheinfelden

Lothair Udo II (c. 1025 – 1082) was Margrave of the Nordmark from 1057 until his death and also Count of Stade (as Lothair Udo III). He was the only son of Lothair Udo I of the Udonids and Adelaide of Rheinfelden.

The power base of his family lay around Harsefeld and Stade, but through advantageous marriages, they had control of almost the entire eastern third of the Duchy of Saxony in lands and rights.

In 1044, William became Margrave of the Nordmark. In 1056, the Saxons were defeated by the Liutizi at the Battle of Pritzlawa (Havelmündung), and William was killed. The Emperor Henry III and Lothair Udo I died the same year. Lothair Udo II came into a very strong position and became margrave the next year.

Lothair initially placed himself in opposition to the Billung family and Adalbert of Bremen. Adalbert had won great influence over the young King Henry IV and he designed to extend the influence of the Archdiocese of Hamburg-Bremen over the various small counties of Saxony, especially between the Elbe and the Weser in order to better evangelise the Slavs. In 1063, Adalbert annexed Stade from Lothair. Originally he had supported Lothair as a counterweight to Billung influence in Saxony, but military conflict soon broke out between the Udonids and the Billungs.

After Henry IV came of age in 1065, Lothair recovered his lost territories from the Billung and Adalbert, whose took a serious setback (1066). In 1068, Lothair was granted the March of Zeitz. In that year, he and Henry attacked the Liutizi along the Elbe, but in 1069 they called the expedition off in failure.

In 1071, Lothair was involved in the conspiracy of Bardowiek. In 1073, he was on the side of the king, but the policy of Adalbert and his successor Liemar put him at odds with the royal party again. In 1075, he fought under Otto of Nordheim at the Battle of Homburg against the king. They were defeated. Lothair immediately made peace with the king to allow his hostage son to go free. The rest of the Saxon nobles went through long negotiations.

Lothair was succeeded by his son Henry in 1082. His widow was Oda (born c. 1050), daughter of Richenza (daughter of Otto II of Swabia) and Herman III, Count of Werl.

== Marriage and issue ==
Lothair Udo married Oda of Werl, daughter of Herman III, Count of Werl, and his wife Richenza. (also Uda and Hilaria; b. ca. 1050), their children were:

- Henry I the Long, Margrave of the Nordmark and Count of Stade (as Henry III) (ca. 1065–27 June 1087), married Eupraxia of Kiev
- Lothair Udo III, Margrave of the Nordmark and Count of Stade (as Lothair Udo IV) (ca. 1070–2 June 1106)
- Rudolf I, Margrave of the Nordmark and Count of Stade (d. 7 December 1124), married Richardis, daughter of Hermann, Count of Sponheim-Lavanttal (d. 22 July 1118), since 1080 Burgrave of Magdeburg, brother of Archbishop Hartwig of Magdeburg.
- Siegfried (d. ca. 1111), Provost at Magdeburg
- Adelaide (Adelheid) (ca. 1065–18 October 1110), married (1) with Frederick III, Count of Goseck (ca. 1065–5 February 1085), also Count of Putelendorf and as Frederick III also Count Palatine of Saxony, and (2) with Louis the Jumper, Count of Schauenburg (near Friedrichroda, Thuringia; 1042–1123) also Count of Thuringia.

Lothair Udo was succeeded as margrave and count by his son Henry upon his death.

== Sources ==
- Genealogie Mittelalter
