= Eric III of Denmark =

King of Denmark from 1137 to 1146

Eric III Lamb
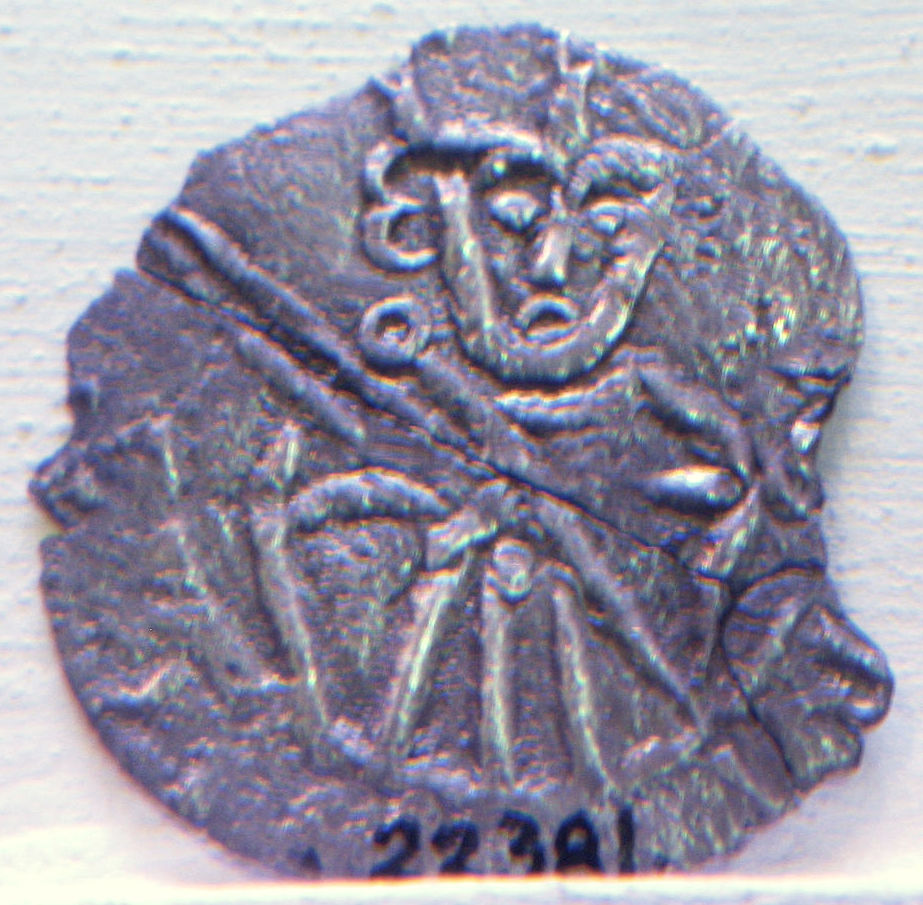
- Eric on his coin

King of Denmark
- Reign: 1137–1146
- Predecessor: Eric II
- Successor: Sweyn III, Canute V, Valdemar I
- Born: c. 1120
- Died: 27 August 1146 (aged 25–26); Odense, Denmark
- Burial: St. Canute's Abbey, Odense
- Consort: Lutgard of Salzwedel
- House: Estridsen
- Father: Hakon Sunnivasson
- Mother: Ragnhild of Denmark

Eric III Lamb (Danish: Erik III Lam, c. 1120 – 27 August 1146) was King of Denmark from 1137 until 1146. He was the grandson of Eric I and the nephew of Eric II, whom he succeeded on the throne. He abdicated in 1146, becoming the first Danish monarch to do so voluntarily. (Note: The only other is Margrethe II, who abdicated in 2024.) His succession led to a period of civil war between Sweyn III, Canute V, and Valdemar I.

== Biography ==
Eric was born on Funen. His mother was Ragnhild, the daughter of King Eric I of Denmark, and his father was the nobleman Hakon Sunnivasson, a great-grandson of King Magnus the Good of Norway and Denmark. Eric was the nephew of Eric II of Denmark; he fought for Eric II at the decisive Battle of Fotevik in 1134, and succeeded him to the throne when he was murdered in 1137.

Not much is known of Eric's kingship; there is much disagreement among contemporary chroniclers about his personality, and he is portrayed both as a passive and irresolute man, but also as an eager and brave fighter.

Eric had to fight for his kingship against his cousin Olaf Haraldsen, sometimes called Olaf II. Olaf established a power base in Scania in 1139 and tried to usurp the throne from there, but Eric defeated and killed him in 1141 near Helsingborg. During the Danish Civil Wars, the Wends raided the Danish coasts and inlets without much Danish resistance. Eric supported Magnus the Blind and Sigurd Slembe in the Norwegian civil war. He worked to aggrandize the church, especially St. Canute's Abbey in Odense, and had a close relationship with bishop Eskil of Roskilde.

In 1143, he married Lutgard of Salzwedel, daughter of Rudolf I, Margrave of the Nordmark. Eric and Lutgard were married by Rudolf's son Hartwig, then Provost of Bremen Cathedral, in 1143 or 1144.

In 1146, Eric abdicated for unknown reasons. He entered St. Canute's Abbey, where he died on 27 August 1146 and was buried in the cloister. His abdication has been explained as being rooted either in his realization of his inability to govern, or in an illness which ultimately killed him.

== Legacy ==
His nickname "Lam" means "lamb". This is taken either to reference the Lamb of God as he was seen as a pious man, and to describe his mildhearted and generous nature; or to indicate a weak and soft king. He married Lutgard of Salzwedel in 1144, which indicated an increasing German influence on Denmark. He and Lutgard had no children, though Eric fathered a son, Magnus, out of wedlock. After Eric died, Lutgard married Herman II of Winzenburg.

== Notes ==
Eric Lamb descended from House of Estridsen & House of St. Olaf Born: c. 1120 Died: 27 August 1146
Regnal titles
Preceded by Eric the Memorable	King of Denmark; 1137–1146	Succeeded by Sweyn III; Canute V Valdemar I
