= Counts of Stade =

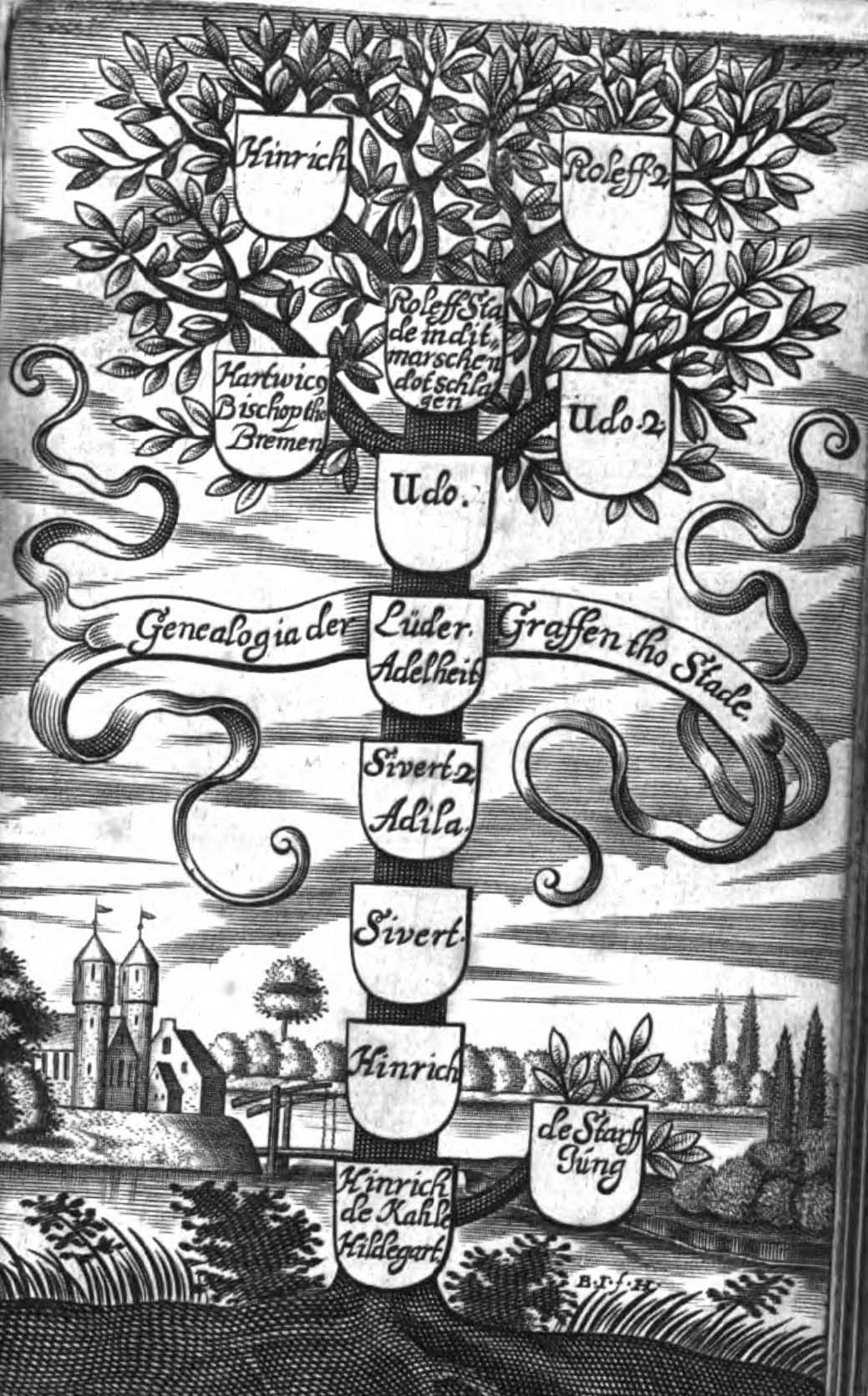
Family tree of the counts of Stade from 1659

The counts of Stade were members of the Saxony nobility beginning in the 10th century. Stade had developed since the 8th century as a principal center of trade and communications. The Counts of Stade created their domain between the lower Elbe and Weser rivers. They extended their power northwards with the acquisition of Dithmarschen in the 11th century. They became the Margraves of the Nordmark (Northern March) in 1056. There is also a close political and familial relationship between the Counts of Stade and the Counts of Walbeck. The Northern March was replaced with the March of Brandenburg by Albert the Bear in the 12th century. The family of Counts of Stade is referred to as the House of Udonids.

The principal sources for the Counts of Stade are the Deeds of the Saxons by Widukind of Corvey, the Annals of Fulda, the anonymous Annalista Saxo, and Chronicon Thietmari by Thietmar of Merseburg. Thietmar was the great-grandson of Lothar II, Count of Stade, and Lothar I, Count of Walbeck, both killed fighting the Slavs at the Battle of Lenzen in 929.

The Counts of Stade were:

- Lothar I (died 880)
- Lothar II, son of the previous (880–929)
- Wichmann I the Elder (929–944)
- Wichmann II the Younger, son of the previous (944–955)
- Egbert the One-Eyed, brother of the previous (reign dates uncertain)
- Henry I the Bald, son of Lothar II, contested with the sons of Wichmann I (955–976)
- Siegfried I (reign dates uncertain), brother of the previous
- Henry II the Good, son of Henry I the Bald (976–1016)
- Lothair Udo I, brother of the previous (not to be confused with Lothair Udo I, Margrave of the Nordmark) (reign dates uncertain)
- Siegfried II, brother of the previous (1016–1037)
- Lothair Udo II, son of the previous, also Margrave of the Nordmark (as Lothair Udo I) (1037-–1057)
- Lothair Udo III, son of the previous, also Margrave of the Nordmark (as Lothair Udo II) (1057–1082)
- Henry III the Long, son of the previous, also Margrave of the Nordmark (as Henry I) (1082–1087)
- Lothair Udo IV, brother of the previous, also Margrave of the Nordmark (as Lothair Udo III) (1087–1106)
- Rudolf I, brother of the previous, also Margrave of the Nordmark (1106–1124)
- Frederich, nondynastic (1124–1135)
- Henry IV, son of Lothair Udo IV, also Margrave of the Nordmark (as Henry II) (1114–1128)
- Udo V, son of Rudolf I, also Margrave of the Nordmark (as Udo IV) (1128–1130)
- Rudolf II, brother of the previous, also Margrave of the Nordmark (1130–1144)
- Hartwig, also the Archbishop of Bremen, brother of the previous (1144–1168).

The precise dates of reign are confusing from 1106 until 1135, as the rightful heir Henry IV was not yet of age and the nondynastic Frederich was brought in. The titles of Count of Stade and Margrave of the Nordmark were also not interchangeable during this period, causing further uncertainty.

The Counts of Stade are also closely tied to, and sometimes rivals with, the Counts of Walbeck. The family tree of the descendants of Lothar II and their relationships with the House of Billung, in particular with Wichmann, can be found in Warner’s book on Ottonian Germany. Wichmann's ties with the Margraves of the Nordmark, particularly with his grandson Dietrich, the first Margrave of the Nordmark, provide some credence to these claims.

After the death of Rudolf II in 1144, his brother and successor Hartwig transferred his inheritance to the archbishopric of Bremen in return for a regrant of a life interest, presumably to obtain a powerful protector against the aggression of Henry the Lion. The move was ineffective, as Henry took possession of the lands and captured both Hartwig and the archbishop Adelbero, releasing them only after they agreed to recognize his claim.

== Sources ==
- Reuter, Timothy (translator), The Annals of Fulda, Manchester University Press, Manchester, 1992
- Warner, David A., Ottonian Germany: The Chronicon of Thietmar of Merseburg, Manchester University Press, Manchester, 2001
- Reuter, Timothy, Germany in the Early Middle Ages, 800-1036, London and New York, 1992
- Bachrach, B. S. (translator), Widukind of Corvey, Deeds of the Saxons, The Catholic University of America Press, Washington, DC, 2004
- Leyser, Karl. Medieval Germany and Its Neighbours 900-1250, The Hambledon Press, London, 1982
- Bury, J. B. (editor), The Cambridge Medieval History: Volume III, Germany and the Western Empire, Cambridge University Press, 1922
