= Henry the Long =

Margrave of the Nordmark, Count of Stade

Henry I
- Margrave of the Nordmark and Count of Stade
- Born: c. 1065
- Died: 27 June 1087 (aged 21–22)
- Spouse: Eupraxia of Kiev
- Father: Lothair Udo II, Margrave of the Nordmark
- Mother: Oda of Werl

Henry the Long (c. 1065 – 27 June 1087) was Margrave of the Nordmark (numbered Henry I) and Count of Stade (numbered Henry III). He was son of Lothair Udo II, Margrave of the Nordmark, and Oda of Werl, daughter of Herman III, Count of Werl, and Richenza of Swabia.

Henry married Eupraxia of Kiev, daughter of Vsevolod I, Grand Prince of Kiev, and his second wife Anna. There were no children as a result of this marriage, and Eupraxia, widowed, married next Henry IV, then King of Saxony, who became Holy Roman Emperor.

Raffensperger suggests that Henry's motivation in marrying Eupraxia was to bring Saxony closer to Kiev. In fact, the marriage may have been arranged by Oda of Stade, daughter of Lothair Udo I, Margrave of the Nordmark, who had married Sviatoslav II, Grand Prince of Kiev. Oda is identified as a relative of Henry’s father Lothair Udo II as well as a niece of Henry III, Holy Roman Emperor, and Pope Leo IX.

Upon his death, Henry was succeeded as margrave and count by his brother Lothair Udo III.
