= Hartwig, Count of Stade =

Hartwig (1118 – October 1168), Count of Stade and Archbishop of Bremen, son of Rudolf I, Margrave of the Nordmark, and Richardis, daughter of Hermann von Sponheim, Burgrave of Magdeburg.

Hartwig became the last Count of Stade belonging to the House of Udonids in 1144 when his brother Rudolf died. He succeeded Adalbero as the Archbishop of Bremen in August 1148. He is regarded as the most politically significant Archbishop of Bremen of the 12th century.

Hartwig was first canon of Magdeburg Cathedral. In 1143, he became Provost of Bremen Cathedral and was from 1148 until his death, archbishop of the diocese.

Hartwig contracted to marry his sister Lutgard of Salzwedel to King Eric III of Denmark in 1143 or 1144. With the death of their elder brother Count Rudolf II of Stade and Freckleben in 1144, who was without heir, Lutgard and her children became the eventual heirs of the County of Stade, since her younger, inheriting brother, Hartwig, was also childless. However, in 1148, Hartwig stipulated with the cathedral chapter his election as Archbishop of Bremen in return for his bequest of the county to the archdiocese on his death, thus disinheriting Lutgard's children.

He participated in the Diet of Roncaglia in 1158 in which Emperor Frederick Barbarossa attempted to establish his rights as feudal sovereign, but Hartwig returned home prior to the resulting Italian Campaign by the Emperor.

After the death of Rudolf II in 1144, Hartwig transferred his inheritance to the archbishopric of Bremen in return for a regrant of a life interest, presumably to obtain a powerful protector against the aggression of Henry the Lion. The move was ineffective, as Henry took possession of the lands and captured both Hartwig and the archbishop Adelbero, releasing them only after they agreed to recognize his claim. In 1890, the Hartwigstraße in Bremen-Schwachhausen was named after him.

== Sources ==
- Krause, Karl Ernst Hermann (1884). Lothar Udo II. und das Stader Grafenhaus | Allgemeine Deutsche Biographie. Band 19. Leipzig: Duncker & Humblot.
- Georg, Dehio (1879). Hartwig I, Erzbischof von Bremen | Allgemeine Deutsche Biographie (in German). Leipzig: Duncker & Humblot.
- Glaeske, Günter (1969). Hartwig I. | Neue Deutsche Biographie. Berlin: Duncker & Humblot.
- Schwarzwälder, Herbert (1996). Die Bischöfe und Erzbischöfe von Bremen, Ihre Herkunft und Amtszeit - ihr Tod und ihre Gräber | Die Gräber im Bremer St. Petri Dom, Blätter der "Maus". Bremen: Gesellschaft für Familienforschung.
