= Disibod =

Coordinates: 49.777°N 7.701°E

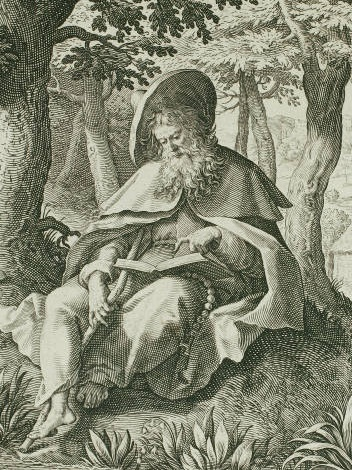

Saint Disibod (619–c. 674) was an Irish monk and hermit, first mentioned in a martyrologium by Hrabanus Maurus (9th century). Hildegard of Bingen around 1170 composed a Vita of Saint Disibod. He is commemorated on 8 September.

== Life ==
He was born the son of one of the lesser chieftains in Ireland. At the age of thirty he was ordained, and shortly after, chosen to succeed the recently deceased bishop. After many years, discouraged at the lack of interest of the people, he resigned and decided to go abroad. According to Hildegard's Vita sancti Dysibodi, Disibod came to the Frankish Empire in 640 as a missionary, accompanied by his disciples Giswald, Clemens and Sallust. They were active in the Vosges and Ardennes, until, guided by a dream, Disibod built a cell at the confluence of the rivers Nahe and Glan, the location of the later monastery of Disibodenberg.

His labours continued during the latter half of the seventh century, and, though he led the life of an anchorite, he had a numerous community, who built bee-hive cells, in the Irish fashion, on the eastern slopes of the hill. It is thought that, before Disibod's arrival, the hill already was the site of a Celtic temple. He frequently wished to appoint a head over the community, but the monks strenuously objected, and would have none while he lived.
