= Rudolf II, Margrave of the Nordmark =

12th Century Margrave of the Nordmark, Count of Dithmarshen, Stade, and Freckleben

Rudolf II
- Margrave of the Nordmark and Count of Stade
- Tenure: 1132 – 1144
- Died: 14 March 1144
- Noble family: Udonids
- Spouse: Elisabeth of Styria
- Father: Rudolf I, Margrave of the Nordmark
- Mother: Richardis of Sponheim

Rudolf II (died 14 March 1144), Margrave of the Nordmark, and Count of Stade, Dithmarschen and Freckleben, son of Rudolf I, Margrave of the Nordmark, and Richardis, daughter of Hermann von Sponheim, Burgrave of Magdeburg.

Rudolf, the traditional heir to the margraviate assumed the title upon the death of his predecessor Conrad von Plötzkau.

A chronicle of the 15th century reported that Rudolf resided in Burg, Dithmarschen (Bökelnburg). He ruled with a heavy hand and demanded his grain tithe even after several years of drought. The Dithmarscher farmers used a ruse to get rid of their unpopular regent. Hidden in sacks of corn were weapons. As agreed, they opened the bags at the sound of the battle cry "Röhret de Hann, snidet de sac spell!" (Shall ye touch hands, cuts the bag volumes). They set the castle on fire, killed the count and so won their freedom. This event is still recounted today in performances at the castle. His widow, Elizabeth, later married Henry V, Duke of Carinthia.

Rudolf was married to Elisabeth, daughter of Leopold I the Strong, Margrave of Styria. No children are recorded of this union. With the death of Rudolf, the male line of the Margraves of the Nordmark died out.

After the death of Rudolf, his brother Hartwig transferred his inheritance to the Archbishopric of Bremen in return for a regrant of a life interest, presumably to obtain a powerful protector against the aggression of Henry the Lion. The move was ineffective, as Henry took possession of the lands and captured both Hartwig and the archbishop Adelbero, releasing them only after they agreed to recognize his claim.

Rudolf’s successor as Margrave of the Nordmark was Albert the Bear. Upon Rudolf's death, his brother Hartwig succeeded him as Count of Stade.

== Sources ==
Krause, Karl Ernst Hermann, Lothar Udo II. und das Stader Grafenhaus. In: Allgemeine Deutsche Biographie. Band 19, Duncker & Humblot, Leipzig, 1884
