= List of prince-archbishops, archbishops, bishops and administrators of Bremen =

This list records the bishops of the Roman Catholic diocese of Bremen (German: Bistum Bremen), supposedly a suffragan of the Archbishopric of Cologne, then of the bishops of Bremen, who were in personal union archbishops of Hamburg (simply titled Archbishops of Hamburg-Bremen), later simply titled archbishops of Bremen, since 1180 simultaneously officiating as rulers of princely rank (prince-archbishop) in the Prince-Archbishopric of Bremen (German: Erzstift Bremen; est. 1180 and secularised in 1648), a state of imperial immediacy within the Holy Roman Empire. Bremen and Hamburg were the seats of the chapters at Bremen Cathedral and Hamburg Concathedral, while the incumbents used to reside in their castle in Vörde since 1219.

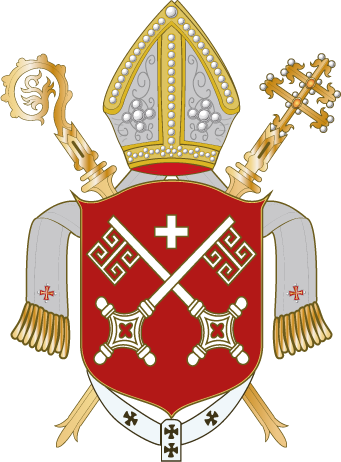
Coat-of-arms of the Prince-Archbishopric of Bremen

== Titles of the incumbents of the Bremian See ==
Not all incumbents of the Bremian See were imperially invested princely power as Prince-Archbishops and not all were papally confirmed as bishops. In 1180 part of the Bremian diocesan territory and small parts of the neighbouring Diocese of Verden were disentangled from the Duchy of Saxony and became an own territory of imperial immediacy called Prince-Archbishopric of Bremen (German: Erzstift Bremen), a vassal of the Holy Roman Empire. The prince-archbishopric was an elective monarchy, with the monarch being the respective archbishop usually elected by the Bremian Chapters at Bremen Cathedral and Hamburg Concathedral, with the latter enfranchised to three capitular votes, and confirmed by the Holy See, or exceptionally only appointed by the Holy See. Papally confirmed archbishops were then invested by the emperor with the princely regalia, thus the title prince-archbishop. However, sometimes the respective incumbent of the see never gained a papal confirmation, but was still invested the princely regalia. Also, the opposite occurred with a papally confirmed archbishop, never invested as prince. A number of incumbents, elected by the chapter, neither achieved papal confirmation nor imperial investiture, but as a matter of fact nevertheless de facto held the princely power. The respective incumbents of the see bore the following titles:

- Bishop of Bremen from 787 to 845
- Archbishop of Hamburg and Bishop of Bremen in personal union (colloquially also Archbishop of Hamburg-Bremen) from 848 to 1072
- Archbishop of Bremen (colloquially also Archbishop of Hamburg-Bremen) from 1072 to 1179
- Prince-Archbishop of Bremen from 1180 to 1566, paralleled by the de facto rule of Catholic Administrators from 1316 to 1327 and again 1348 to 1360
- Administrator of the Prince-Archbishopric of Bremen 1316 to 1327, 1348 to 1360, and again 1568 to 1645. Either simply de facto replacing the Prince-Archbishop or lacking canon-law prerequisites, the incumbent of the see would officially only hold the title administrator (but nevertheless colloquially referred to as Prince-Archbishop). Between 1568 and 1645 all administrators were Lutherans, while else they were Roman Catholics.
- The last, but only provisional incumbent of the See, Francis of Wartenberg, therefore bore the title Vicar Apostolic (1645–1648)

== Catholic Bishops of Bremen till 845 ==
Roman Catholic Bishops of Bremen (787–845)
| Episcopate | Picture | Name | Birth and death with places | Reason for end of office | Notes |
| 787–789 | | Willehad also Willehadus or Willihad | Northumbria *ca. 745 – 8 November 789*, Blexen, today a part of Nordenham | death | Saint |
| 789–805 | | sede vacante | | | |
| 805–838 | | Willerich also Willeric, Wilrich, Wilderic | *unknown – 4 May? 838* | death | |
| 838–845 | | Leuderich also Leutrich in High German | *unknown – 24 August 845* | death | |
| 845–847 | | sede vacante | | | |

== Catholic Archbishops of Hamburg in personal union Bishops of Bremen (848–1072) ==
Roman Catholic Archbishops of Hamburg in personal union Bishops of Bremen (848–1072)
| Episcopate | Picture | Name | Birth and death with places | Reason for end of office | Notes |
| 847–865 | | Ansgar also Anschar in Low Saxon, Oskar in Scandinavian languages | Corbie; *796 or 8 September 801? – 3 February 865*; Bremen | death | in personal union archbishop of Hamburg 831–865, Apostle of the North; Saint |
| 865–888 | | Rimbert of Turholt also Rembert or Rembart | near Turholt? in Flanders; *830 – 11 June 888*, Bremen | death | second Apostle of the North; Saint |
| 888–909 | | Adalgar also Adelger | *unknown – 9 May 909*; Bremen | death | Saint |
| *909–916 | | Hoger also Huggar | *unknown – 20 December 916* | death | |
| 917–918 | | Reginwart | *unknown – 1 October 918* | death | |
| 918–936 | | Unni | *unknown – 17 September 936*, Birka | death | third Apostle of the North; Saint |
| 936–988 | | Adaldag also Adelgis or Adelger | *ca. 900 – 28 April 988* | death | |
| 988–1013 | | Liawizo I also Libizo, Libentius I in Latin | Burgundy or Raetia *unknown – 4 January 1013* | death | Apostle of the Slavs uncle of Liawizo II; Saint |
| 1013–1026 | | Unwan, Count Palatine of Saxony also Unwin (House of Immeding) | *unknown – 5 July 1026*; Bremen | death | |
| 1026–1032 | | Liawizo II also Libentius II | *unknown – 24 August 1032* | death | nephew of Liawizo I |
| 1032–1035 | | Hermann | *unknown – 19 September 1035* | death | |
| 1035–1043 | | Adalbrand of Bremen (in High German) also Alebrand in Low Saxon, or Bezelin, Becelin, Bencelin | *unknown – 15 April 1043 | death | |
| 1043–1072 | | Adalbert, Count Palatine of Saxony as Albert I | Goseck *ca. 1000 – 16/25 March 1072*; Goslar | death | |

== Catholic Archbishops of Bremen (1072–1179) ==
Roman Catholic Archbishops of Bremen (1072–1179)
| Episcopate | Picture | Name | Birth and death with places | Reason for end of office | Notes |
| 1072–1101 | | Liemar | *unknown – 16 May 1101*; Bremen | death | |
| 1101–1104 | | Humbert, Archbishop of Bremen | *unknown – 10 November 1104* | death | During his term, the whole of Scandinavia was removed from the archdiocese of Bremen to form its own archdiocese, seated in Lund |
| 1104–1123 | | Frederick I | *unknown – 29 January 1123* | death | |
| 1123–1148 | | Adalbero, Archbishop of Bremen as Adalbert II | *unknown – 5 August 1148* | death | |
| 1148–1168 | | Hartwig, Count of Stade as Hartwig I (House of Udonids) | *before 1124 – 11 October 1168*; Bremen | death | brother of Liutgard of Stade, Queen consort of Denmark |
| 1168, episcopate claimed | | Siegfried of Anhalt (House of Ascania) | *ca. 1132 – 24 October 1184* | inhibited by Guelphic partisans | Archbishop Elect of Bremen, elected by the Chapter and preferred by his father Albert the Bear, Bishop of Brandenburg 1173–1179, became Prince-Archbishop of Bremen in 1180 |
| 1168–1178 | | Baldwin I also Balduin | *unknown – 18 June 1178*; Bremen | dismissed by Pope Alexander III, ensued by Baldwin's death | preferred candidate of Guelphic Henry III, the Lion, imposed by Frederick I Barbarossa against the Chapter's candidate Siegfried |
| 1178–1179 | | Bert(h)old also Bertram | *unknown – 6 April 1212* | dismissal | never papally confirmed, Prince-Bishop of Metz 1180–1212 |

== Catholic Prince-Archbishops of Bremen (1180–1316) ==
Roman Catholic Prince-Archbishops of Bremen (1180–1316)
| Reign and episcopate | Picture | Name | Birth and death with places | Reason for end of office | Notes |
| 1180–1184 | | Siegfried of Anhalt (House of Ascania) | *ca. 1132 – 24 October 1184* | death | before bishop of Brandenburg 1173–1180 |
| 1184–1185 | | rule by the Chapter due to sede vacante | | | |
| 1185–1190 | | Hartwig of Uthlede as Hartwig II, also Wilrich | *unknown – 3 November 1207* | dismissal | deposed as prince by Henry VI, never papally dismissed as archbishop |
| 1190–1192 | | rule by the Chapter due to sede vacante | | | Chapter disregarded Hartwig II's persisting papal acceptance as archbishop |
| 1192 | | Valdemar of Denmark also Waldemar (House of Estridsen) | *1157/1158 – April 1235 or 1236*; Cîteaux | held in Danish captivity 1193–1206 | imprisoned by Canute VI of Denmark, also bishop of Schleswig 1182–1208 |
| 1192–1207 | | Hartwig of Uthlede as Hartwig II, also Wilrich | *unknown – 3 November 1207* | death | de facto reaccepted by the Chapter, since Valdemar stayed imprisoned |
| 1207–1210 | | Burchard, Count of Stumpenhusen as Burchard I | | resignation | temporarily accepted as anti-archbishop only in Hamburg, nephew of Gerard I |
| 1208–1217 | | Valdemar of Denmark (House of Estridsen) | *1157/1158 – April 1235 or 1236*; Cîteaux | dismissal | only in Bremen accepted as imperially invested prince, papally dismissed and banned |
| 1210–1219 | | Gerard of Oldenburg-Wildeshausen as Gerard I (House of Oldenburg) | *unknown – 14 August 1219* | death | uncle of Burchard of Stumpenhusen, also prince-bishop of Osnabrück 1190–1216 |
| 1219–1258 | | Gerhard of Lippe also Gerard II (House of Lippe) | *ca. 1190 – 27 July or 28 August 1258*; Vörde | death | son of Bernard II, Lord of Lippe, titled Bishop of Hamburg in the diocesan territory right of the Elbe, and Archbishop of Bremen left of the Elbe |
| 1258–1273 | | Hildebold, Count of Wunstorf | *unknown – 11 October 1273* | death | temporarily rivalled by anti-archbishop Gerhard of Lippe, accepted only in Hamburg, a grandnephew of Gerard II and supported by his uncle Simon, Gerard II's coadjutor |
| 1273–1274 | | rule by the Chapter due to sede vacante | | | |
| 1274–1306 | | Gilbert of Brunckhorst also Gis(el)bert of Bronchorst (House of Bronckhorst) | *unknown – 18 November 1306*; Vörde | death | |
| 1306–1307 | | Henry of Goltern also of Golthorn, as Henry I | *unknown – 9 April 1307* | death | died before papal confirmation |
| 1307, only elect | | Florence, Count of Brunckhorst also Florentius, Floris, also of Bronchorst (House of Bronckhorst) | *unknown – 1308*; Avignon | death | died before papal confirmation, counter-candidate to the next |
| 1307, only elect | | Bernard of Wölpe (Counts of Wölpe) | *ca. 1230/1240 – 17 September 1310* | death | never papally confirmed, counter-candidate to the former |
| 1307–1310 | | rule by the Chapter due to sede vacante | | | |
| 1310–1316 (1327) | | Jens Grand the Firebug as John I, (House of Hvide) | *ca. 1260 – 30 May 1327*; Avignon | declared mentally insane by the Chapter on 19 May 1316 and dismissed, however, in 1318 papally recognised again till his death | lacking the capitular elective mandate, only papally appointed, before Archbishop of Lund 1289–1302, Prince-Archbishop of Riga 1304–1310 |

== Catholic Administrators (1316–1327; 1345–1362) and Prince-Archbishops of Bremen (1327–1348) ==
Roman Catholic Administrators of Bremen (1316–1327)
| Reign | Picture | Name | Birth and death with places | Reason for end of office | Notes |
| 1316–1324 | | John of Brunswick and Lunenburg (Celle line) (House of Welf) | *before 1296 – 1324* | deposed by the chapter in 1322, but in the same year papally recognised till his death | son of Otto the Strict, appointed administrator by the chapter, replacing Grand declared mentally insane |
| 1324–1327 | | Nicolaus Ketelhot also Kettelhodt or Kesselhut | *unknown – 11 February 1332* | ascension of Burchard II | also Prince-Bishop of Verden 1312–31 serving as administrator and vicar general (this as of 1322), supported by Vicar General Dietrich von Xanthen |
Roman Catholic Prince-Archbishops of Bremen (1327–1348)
| 1327–1344 | | Burchard Grelle as Burchard II | *unknown – 13 August 1344* | death | |
| 1344–1348 | | Otto of Oldenburg as Otto I (House of Oldenburg) | *unknown – before 14 March 1348* | death | uncle of the next |
Roman Catholic Administrator of Bremen (1345–1360)
| 1345–1360/62 | | Maurice of Oldenburg (House of Oldenburg) | *unknown – 24 July 1364 or 1368* killed in action near Blexen | dismissal | nephew of the former, son of John II elected prince-archbishop by the chapters in 1348, but never papally confirmed, appointed administrator by his uncle and again by Godfrey, who appointed him also coadjutor, forced to resign in 1362 by Albert II |

== Catholic Prince-Archbishops and Administrator of Bremen (1348–1496) ==
Roman Catholic Prince-Archbishops and Administrator of Bremen (1348–1496)
| Reign and episcopate | Picture | Name | Birth and death with places | Reason for end of office | Notes |
| de jure 1348–1360, de facto never | | Godfrey, Count of Arnsberg also Godfried in Low Saxon | *ca. 1285 – 4 December 1363* | resignation | lacking the capitular elective mandate, only papally confirmed as archbishop, never gained power, de facto wielded by Administrator Maurice, also Prince-Bishop of Osnabrück 1321–1349 |
| 1360–1395 | | Albert of Brunswick and Lunenburg (Wolfenbüttel) as Albert II (House of Welf) | *unknown – 14 April 1395* | death | lacking the capitular elective mandate, brother of Magnus II Torquatus |
| 1395–1406 | | Otto of Brunswick and Lunenburg (Wolfenbüttel line) as Otto II (House of Welf) | *ca. 1364 – 30 June 1406 | death | Prince-Bishop of Verden 1388–1395, son of Magnus Torquatus |
| 1406–1421 | | Johann Slamstorp also Slamestorpe, or Schlamsdorf in High German, as John II | *ca. 1350/60 – 20 December 1421 | death | |
| 1422–1435 | | Nicholas of Oldenburg-Delmenhorst (House of Oldenburg) | *unknown – 8 December 1447* | resignation | |
| 1435–1441 | | Baldwin of Wenden also Boldewin of Dahlen or Balduin, as Baldwin II | *unknown – 8 July 1441* | death | |
| 1442–1463 | | Gerard of Hoya also Gerhard von der Hoye as Gerard III (Counts of Hoya) | *unknown – 1463* | death | |
Roman Catholic Administrator of Bremen (1463–1496)
| 1463–1496 | | Henry XXVII of Schwarzburg as Henry II (House of Schwarzburg) | *13 November 1440 – 24 December 1496* underways to East Frisia | death | Archbishop elect, due to minority only appointed administrator, having come of age and after election and investiture as Prince-Bishop of Münster (1466–1496), where he preferently resided, he never pursued his papal appointment as archbishop any more |

== Catholic Prince-Archbishops of Bremen (1497–1568) ==
Roman Catholic Prince-Archbishops of Bremen (1497–1568)
| Reign and episcopate | Picture | Name | Birth and death with places | Reason for end of office | Notes |
| 1497–1511 | | Johann Rode von Wale also Johann Roden Bok, or Rhode or Rufus as John III | *ca. 1445 – 4 December 1511*, Vörde | death | |
| 1511–1542/1547 | | Christopher the Spendthrift of Brunswick and Lunenburg (Wolfenbüttel) (House of Welf) | *1487 – 22 January 1558*, Tangermünde | de facto dismissal as prince by Chapter and Estates | son of Henry IV, also Prince-Bishop of Verden 1502–1558, where he usually resided, dismissed for his prodigality by Chapter and Estates of the Prince-Archbishopric |
| 1542/1547–1549 | | rule by the Chapter and the Prince-Archbishopric's Estates | | Emperor Charles V's threat to impose an administrator | Chapter and Estates dismissed the prince-archbishop due to his prodigality |
| 1549–1558 | | Christopher the Spendthrift (House of Welf) | *1487 – 22 January 1558*, Tangermünde | death | also Prince-Bishop of Verden 1502–1558, where he usually resided, reaccepted as prince by Chapter and Estates after Charles V threatened to install an administrator of his choice, brother of the next |
| 1558–1566 | | George of Brunswick and Lunenburg (Wolfenbüttel line) (House of Welf) | *22 November 1494 – 4 December 1566* | death | brother of the former, also Prince-Bishop of Verden 1558–1566 |
| 1566–1568 | | rule by Chapter and Estates | | majority of Administrator Henry III | sede vacante (1566–1567), then custodianship for the minor administrator |

== Lutheran Administrators of the Prince-Archbishopric of Bremen (1568–1645) ==
Lutheran Administrators of the Prince-Archbishopric of Bremen (1568–1645)
| Reign | Picture | Name | Birth and death with places | Reason for end of office | Notes |
| 1568–1585 | | Henry of Saxe-Lauenburg as Henry III (House of Ascania) | *1 November 1550 – 22 April 1585*; Vörde | death | elected by the Chapter, dominated by Lutheran capitulars, imperially invested as prince, but never papally confirmed, also administrator of the prince-bishoprics of Osnabrück (1574–1585) and Paderborn (1577–1585) |
| 1585–1589 | | rule by Chapter and Estates | | majority of Administrator John Adolphus | custodianship for the minor administrator |
| 1589–1596 | | John Adolphus of Schleswig-Holstein-Gottorp (House of Holstein-Gottorp) | * 27 February 1575 – 31 March 1616*; Gottorp | resignation | also 1st Lutheran administrator of the Prince-Bishopric of Lübeck 1586–1607, after succeeding in 1590 his father as Duke regnant the Bremian Chapter enforced his resignation in favour of his brother |
| 1596–1634 | | John Frederick of Schleswig-Holstein-Gottorp (House of Holstein-Gottorp) | Gottorp, *1 September 1579 – 3 September 1634*, Altkloster | death | also administrator of the Prince-Bishoprics of Lübeck (1607–1634) and Verden (1631–1634). |
| 1634–1635 | | rule by Chapter and Estates due to sede vacante | | | |
| 1635–1645 | | Frederick of Denmark as Frederick II (House of Oldenburg) | Haderslev, *18 March 1609 – 9 February 1670*, Copenhagen | resignation by Second Peace of Brömsebro | also administrator of the Prince-Bishopric of Verden 1623–1629 and again 1634–1644, expelled from both sees by the Swedes |

== Roman Catholic Administrators and Vicars Apostolic, 1635/1645–Secularisation ==
Roman Catholic Administrators and Vicars Apostolic, 1635/1645-Secularisation
| Reign or vicariate | Picture | Name | Birth and death with places | Reason for end of office | Notes |
| 1635, papal appointment, imperial investiture, lacking the capitular elective mandate | | Leopold William of Austria as Administrator Leopold William (House of Habsburg) | Wiener Neustadt, *5 January 1614 – 20 November 1662*, Vienna | due to the Swedish occupation of the Prince-Archbishopric he never gained de facto power | Pope Urban VIII provided him as administrator (he lacked any clerical qualification to be bishop) of Bremen, his father Emperor Ferdinand II invested him with the princely regalia also administrator of the prince-bishoprics of Halberstadt (1628–48), Olomouc (1637–62), Passau (1625–62), Strasbourg (1626–62), and Wrocław (1656–62), as well as of the Prince-Archbishopric of Magdeburg (1631–38). |
| 1645, papal appointment, lacking the capitular elective mandate | | Francis of Wartenberg; Vicar Apostolic Franz Wilhelm | Munich, *1 March 1593 – 1 December 1661*, Ratisbon | he never gained pastoral influence, let alone power as prince-archbishop due to the Swedish occupation of the prince-archbishopric | Pope Innocent X appointed him vicar apostolic, i.e. provisional head of see, also prince-bishop of Osnabrück (1625–1634 and again 1648–1661), of Ratisbon (1649–1661) and of Verden (1630–1631) |
| 1645–1648 | | rule by the Swedish occupants due to sede vacante | | | |
| After 15 May 1648 | | The Prince-Archbishopric was converted into a heritable monarchy, the Duchy of Bremen, first ruled in personal union by the Swedish crown. See List of dukes of Bremen (1648–1823). | | | |
