= Disibodenberg =

Abbey in Rhineland-Palatinate, Germany

Disibodenberg Abbey
- Kloster Disibodenberg
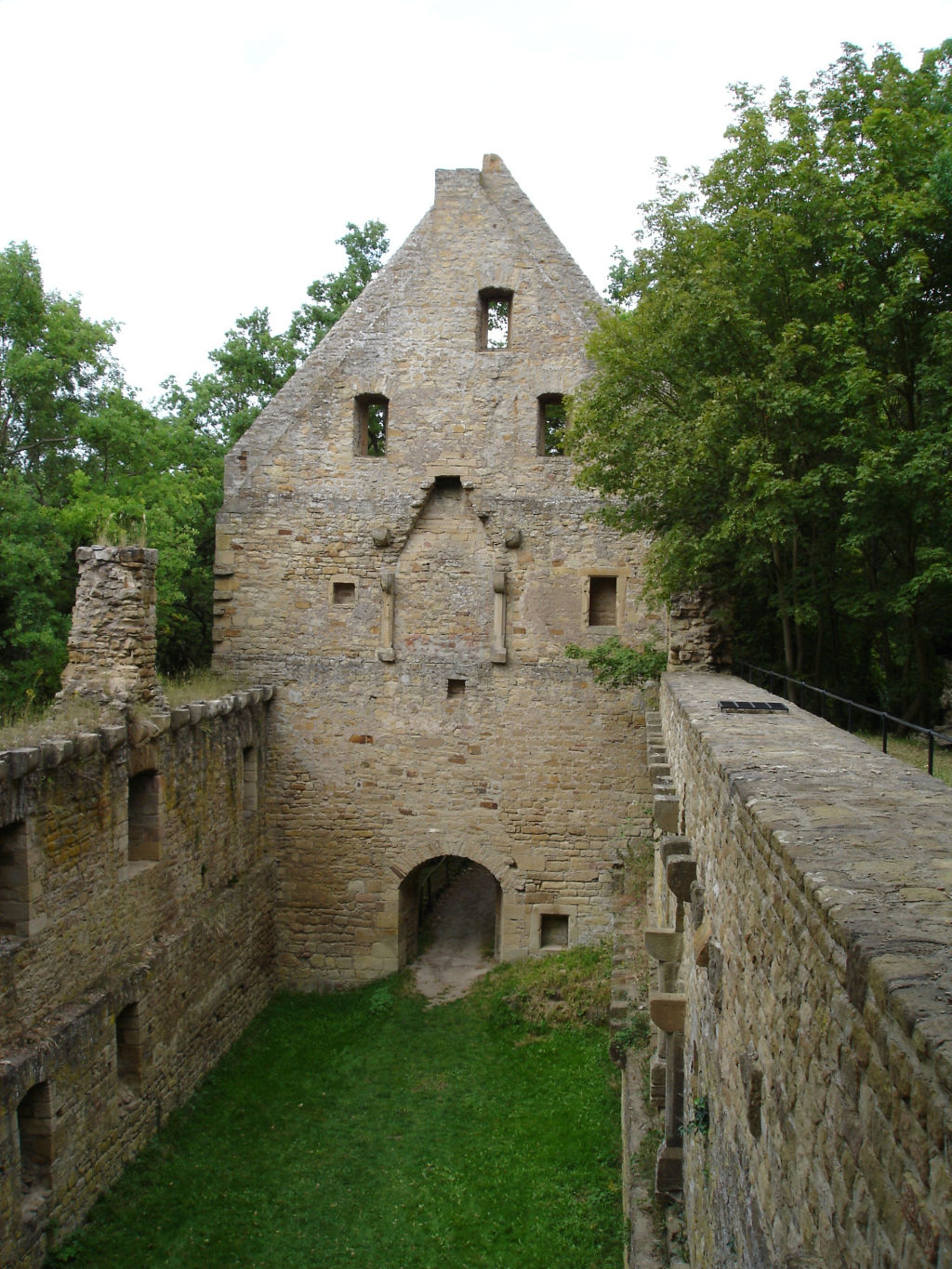
- The ruins of Disibodenberg's guest house, built c.1400

- Location within Rhineland-Palatinate Location within Germany

Monastery information
- Order: Cistercian
- Established: ca. 700
- Disestablished: 1559
- Mother house: Eberbach Abbey

Site
- Location: near Odernheim am Glan
- Coordinates: 49°46′36″N 7°42′04″E
- Public access: https://www.disibodenberg.de/

Disibodenberg (German pronunciation: [diziˈboːdn̩bɛʁk]) is a monastery ruin near Staudernheim in Rhineland-Palatinate, Germany. It was founded on the eponymous hill near the convergence of the Glan and the Nahe rivers by Saint Disibod. Hildegard of Bingen, who wrote Disibod's Hagiography "Vita Sancti Disibodi", lived in Disibodenberg for 39 years. Today, it lies within the "Nature Protection Area Disibodenberg".

== Early history ==
In 640, Disibod came as a missionary from Ireland to Francia. After working for 10 years in Vosges and Ardennes, he arrived near Odernheim am Glan and started teaching there. According to Hildegard's Vita, the monastery was founded "where [Disibod's] walking stick, planted in the ground, elicited greenery, where a white doe scratched a freshwater spring into the ground, and where the two rivers converged". It is thought that, before Disibod's arrival, the hill already was the site of a Celtic temple. Disibod built a Baptistery at the spring on the foot of the hill, after his death in 700, his supposedly miraculous burial site became a destination for pilgrimages.

Shortly after Disibod's death, a church and monastery-like structure was founded on the hill, one of the oldest such foundations within the Diocese of Mainz. In 745, Saint Boniface, the Bishop of Mainz, visited Disibodenberg and translated the relics of Disibod to the altar of the new monastery church.

The monastery was destroyed by the Vikings in 882, and by the Magyars in the early 10th century. In both occasions, the monks fled and abandoned the monastery, it was dissolved by Bishop Hatto II. However, in 1000, Bishop Willigis had the monastery reestablished, entrusting it to 12 Augustinian canons and endowing it with several of the surrounding towns and farms.

In 1107, Archbishop Ruthard transferred the control of the monastery from its canons to a group of Benedictines from Mainz, who presided over the construction of a new monastery church, which was completed in 1143.

== Hildegard of Bingen and later history ==
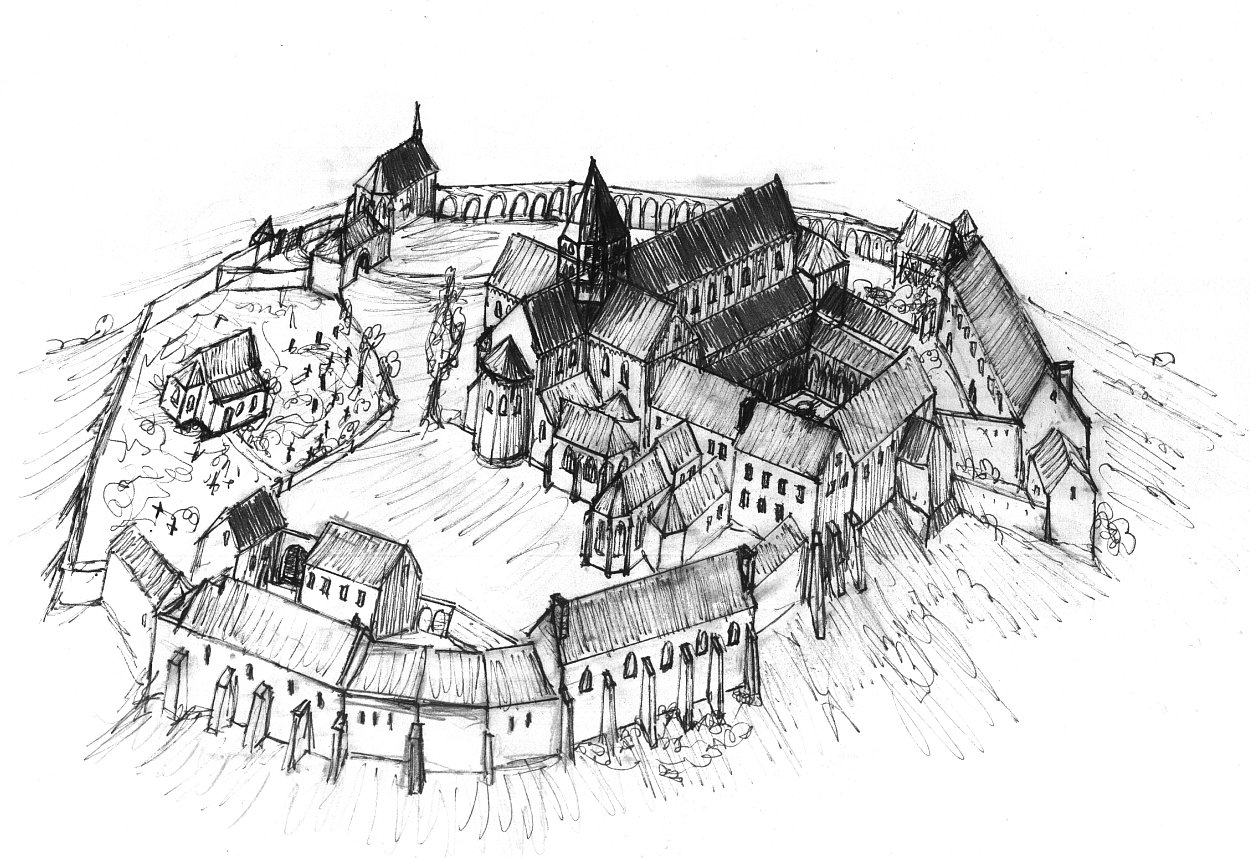
A speculative reconstruction of the monastery in 1500

Following the Benedictine takeover, the Counts of Sponheim sponsored the building of a Frauenklause, a female hermitage associated with the monastery, at Disibodenberg. Jutta von Sponheim, the pious daughter of Stephen II, Count of Sponheim, and Hildegard of Bingen took their vows there from Otto of Bamberg on All Saint's Day 1112.

Following Jutta's death in 1136, Hildegard succeeded her as abbess. The female community at Disibodenberg was moved to nearby Rupertsberg in 1147, following several disputes with the male monks and the growth of Hildegard's Frauenklause to 18 nuns.

Not long after Hildegard's departure from Disibodenberg, the fortunes of the monastery began to darken, mostly due to local feuds and the growing issue of the robber barons in the area. In 1259, Archbishop Gerhard I. von Dhaun of Mainz replaced the Benedictine presence on the now-largely abandoned abbey with Cistercians from Otterberg Abbey. Under Cistercian sponsorship, Disibodenberg's debts were paid and the monastery entered its third, and last, period of prosperity, which lasted until ca. 1500.

The monastery was plundered in 1471 during a dispute between Elector Frederick I and Count Louis I, and in 1504 during the War of the Succession of Landshut. Before it had time to rebuild, the Reformation engulfed the Palatinate, and the last abbott, Peter von Limbach, handed Disibodenberg over to Wolfgang, Count Palatine of Zweibrücken. It was secularized in 1559.

Save for failed attempts in 1631 and 1639 to revitalize the abbey under Spanish patronage during the Thirty Years' War, the monastery fell into ruin. Its buildings were largely intact, albeit ruinous, until the area's occupation by France between 1797 and 1814, during which the monastery's use as a quarry commenced. Spolia from Disibodenberg was widely used for infrastructure and buildings in the surrounding area.

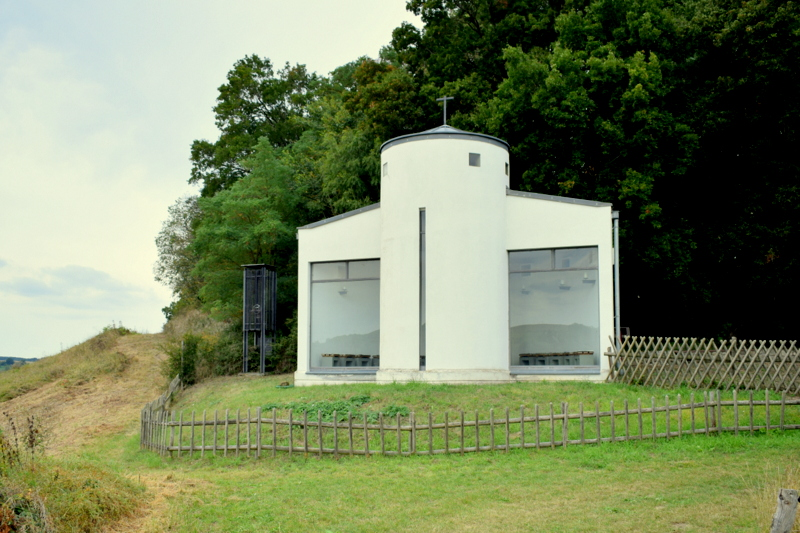
The modern Hildegardis-Kapelle

From 1842 to 1844, then-owner Peter Wannemann uncovered the monastery's remaining ruins and turned the property into a romantic landscape park. The property's last private owner, Ehrengard Freifrau von Racknitz, handed it over to the Disibodenberg Scivias Foundation, which retains ownership to this day.

A small 1998 chapel dedicated to Hildegard of Bingen is situated at the foot of the hill, and wine is cultivated on the hill. The ruins are open for visitors, and contextualized by information panels. A small museum dedicated to Hildegard is situated in a former agricultural building on the site.
