= Udonids =

The Udonids (Udonen) were a German noble family, ruling as both the Counts of Stade and Margraves of the Nordmark, or Northern March, from the 9th to the 12th century. The first formal member of this family was Henry I the Bald, who took his seat in Harsefeld, part of the Duchy of Franconia, where he built a castle in 965. He was the grandson of the first Count of Stade, Lothar I, who was killed by the Great Heathen Army in the Battle of Ebstorf, and was recognized as one of the Martyrs of Ebsdorf by the Catholic Church.

Henry's grandson Lothair Udo I became Margrave of Nordmark in 1056. Because of the Slav uprising of 983, the Northern March in 1056 was limited to today's Altmark, west of the Middle Elbe. Due to Lothair Udo I's position as margrave, the County of Stade on the Lower Elbe was referred to in documents as comitatus marchionis Udonis (the County of Margrave Udo).

In the 1060s Emperor Henry IV looked to enlarge the empire's boundaries and that included the County of Stade. The Udonen settled this in the emperor's favor by agreeing to buy the county from the Archbishopric of Bremen, and ruled as vassals to the emperor as imperial princes. This continued until the deaths or deposition of brothers Udo IV, Rudolf II and Hartwig, which ended the male line of Udonids. Albert the Bear, Duke of Saxony, assumed power over the Margraviate of the Northern March while his successor ad duke, Henry the Lion, ruled the County of Stade from 1145 until forced out by Emperor Frederick Barbarossa. The County of Stade then came under the direct control of the Archbishops of Bremen, whereas Nordmark transitioned to the Margraviate of Brandenburg.

The most reliable of the histories of the family is provided by Thietmar of Merseburg, son of Kunigunde von Stade, Henry's daughter, and her husband Siegfried I the Older, Count of Walbeck. Thietmar had two great-grandfathers, Lothar I of Walbeck and Lothar II of Stade, who died in the Battle of Lenzen in 929.

The earliest mention of the Udonoids is in the annotations of a commemorative edition of the Ragyndrudis Codex associated with Saint Boniface. The latter annotations of the codex recount a Count Henry of Kahle and his son Henry II the Good. The account mentions Henry's second wife Hildegarde and their daughter Hildegarde who married into the Billung family, in particular Bernard I, Duke of Saxony.

Thietmar claims that his grandfather Henry was related to Emperor Otto I, although this relationship has not been proven.

The history of the family is clouded in the years after the death of Lothar at the Battle of Lenzen in 929, with the presence of Wichmann the Elder and his sons, but their criminal behavior soon resulted in the return of the Udonids. With the exception of the nondynastic Frederich, the family ruled the county and margraviate until the mid-12th century.

== Sources ==
- Krause, Karl Ernst Hermann, Lothar Udo II. und das Stader Grafenhaus. In: Allgemeine Deutsche Biographie. Band 19, Duncker & Humblot, Leipzig, 1884
- Dehio, Georg, Hartwig I, Erzbischof von Bremen. In: Allgemeine Deutsche Biographie, Duncker & Humblot, Leipzig, 1879
- Glaeske, Günter, Hartwig I. In: Neue Deutsche Biographie, Duncker & Humblot, Berlin, 1969
- Schwarzwälder, Herbert, Die Bischöfe und Erzbischöfe von Bremen, Ihre Herkunft und Amtszeit - ihr Tod und ihre Gräber, in: Die Gräber im Bremer St. Petri Dom, Blätter der "Maus", Gesellschaft für Familienforschung, Bremen, 1996
