= De Laurentiis =

De Laurentiis may refer to:

- De Laurentiis (surname), Italian surname
- Dino de Laurentiis Cinematografica, an Italian film-production company.
- De Laurentiis Entertainment Group, production company and film distribution unit founded by Dino De Laurentiis

== See also ==
- Laurenti
- Laurentius
