= De Laurentiis (surname) =

De Laurentiis is an Italian surname. Notable people with this surname include:

- Aurelio De Laurentiis (born 1949), Italian film producer and president of S.S.C Napoli
- Dino De Laurentiis (1919–2010), Italian film producer
- Luigi De Laurentiis (1917–1992), Italian film producer
- Giada De Laurentiis (born 1970), Italian American chef
- Martha De Laurentiis (1954–2021), American film producer
- Raffaella De Laurentiis (born 1952), Italian film producer
- Suzanne DeLaurentiis (21st century), American film producer
- Veronica De Laurentiis (born 1950), Italian author
- Teresa de Laurentis (or de Lauretis; born 1938), Italian author and Professor of the History of Consciousness
- Jeffrey DeLaurentis (born 1954), American diplomat and Chargé d'affaires ad interim in the U.S. Embassy of Havana

== See also ==
- De Laurentiis (disambiguation)
