= Laurenti =

Laurenti is a surname. It may refer to:

== People ==
- Adolfo Laurenti (1856-1944), Italian sculptor
- Camillo Laurenti (1861–1938), Italian cardinal
- Cesare Laurenti (engineer), Italian designer of submarines influencing HMS Swordfish (1916)
- Cesare Laurenti (painter) (1854–1936), Italian artist
- Donato Laurenti (died 1584), Roman Catholic Bishop of Ariano and then Bishop of Minori
- Fabien Laurenti (born 1983), French footballer
- Josephus Nicolaus Laurenti (1735-1805), Austrian naturalist and zoologist of Italian origin
- Laurentius Laurenti (1660–1772), German hymnwriter
- Lodovico Filippo Laurenti (1693–1757), Italian composer
- Mariano Laurenti (1929–2022), Italian film director
- Silvio Laurenti Rosa (1892-1965), Italian film director

== Fictional character ==
- Commissario Proteo Laurenti, protagonist in a series of crime novels by Veit Heinichen

== Biology ==
- Aphaenops laurenti, species of beetle in the subfamily Trechinae
- Astylosternus laurenti, species of frog in the family Arthroleptidae
- Boophis laurenti, species of frog in the family Mantellidae
- Chironius laurenti, species of nonvenomous snake in the family Colubridae
- Hyperolius laurenti, species of frog in the family Hyperoliidae
- Idia laurenti, species of litter moth of the family Erebidae

== Other uses ==
- Champagne Laurenti, champagne producer from Les Riceys/France
- Fiat-Laurenti, two classes of Japanese Type L submarine

== See also ==
- Raymond Laurent (1917–2005), herpetologist, origin of reptile binomial name laurenti
