= Laurentius Laurenti =

Laurentius Laurenti (née Lorenz Lorenzen; 1660–1722) was a German hymnwriter.

Lorenz Lorenzen was born in 1660 in Husum in the Duchy of Schleswig, at that time part of Denmark.

He studied at the University of Rostock and in Kiel.

Laurenti was appointed as music director and cantor in the Lutheran cathedral church in Bremen in 1684.

Laurenti died in 1722 in Bremen.
