= Bremen Cathedral =

Cathedral in Bremen, Germany

- Bremer Dom
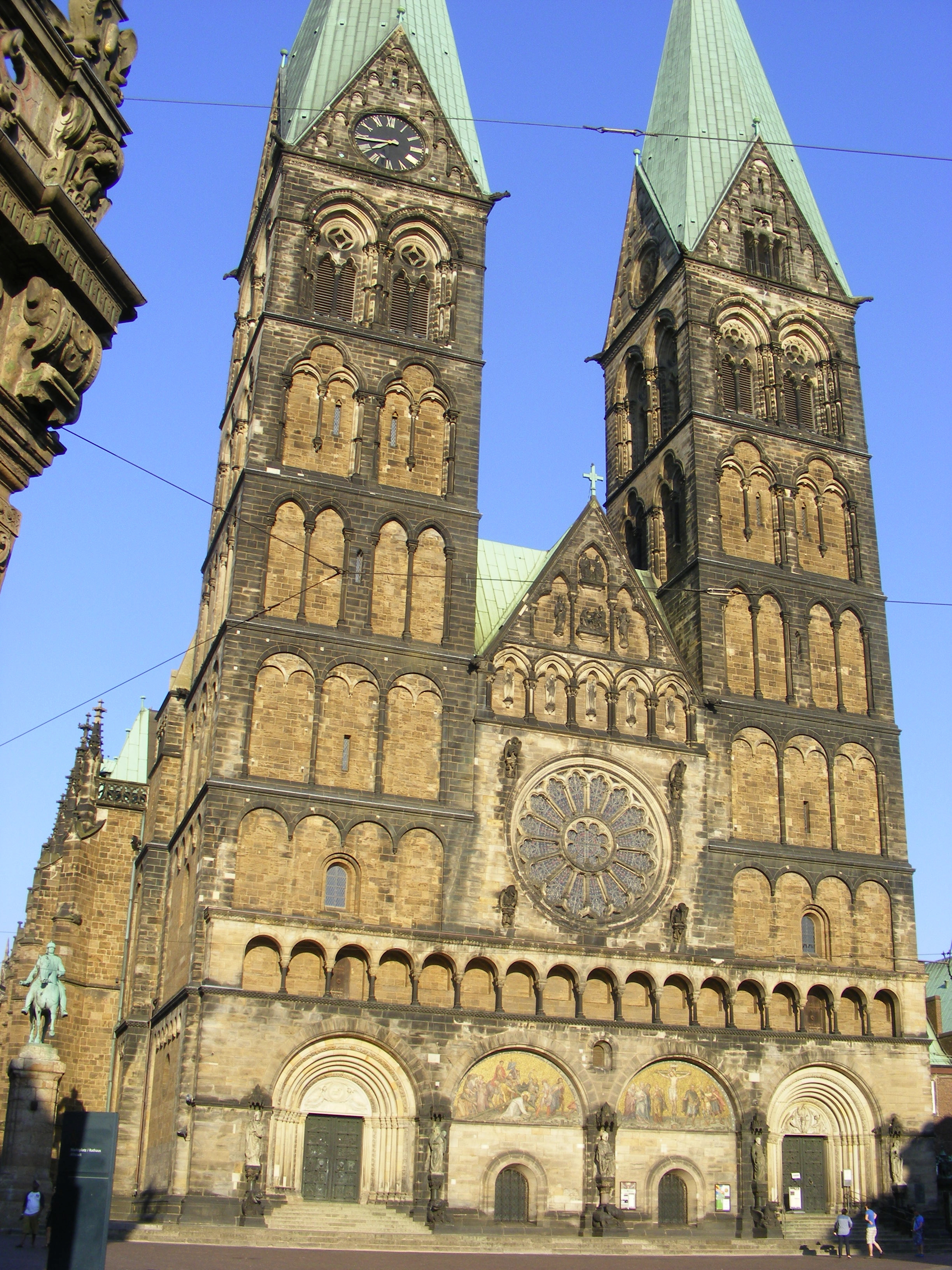
- Bremen Cathedral
- 53°04′32″N 8°48′32″E
- Location: Bremen
- Country: Germany
- Denomination: Evangelical Church in Germany
- Previous denomination: Roman Catholic

Architecture
- Style: Romanesque

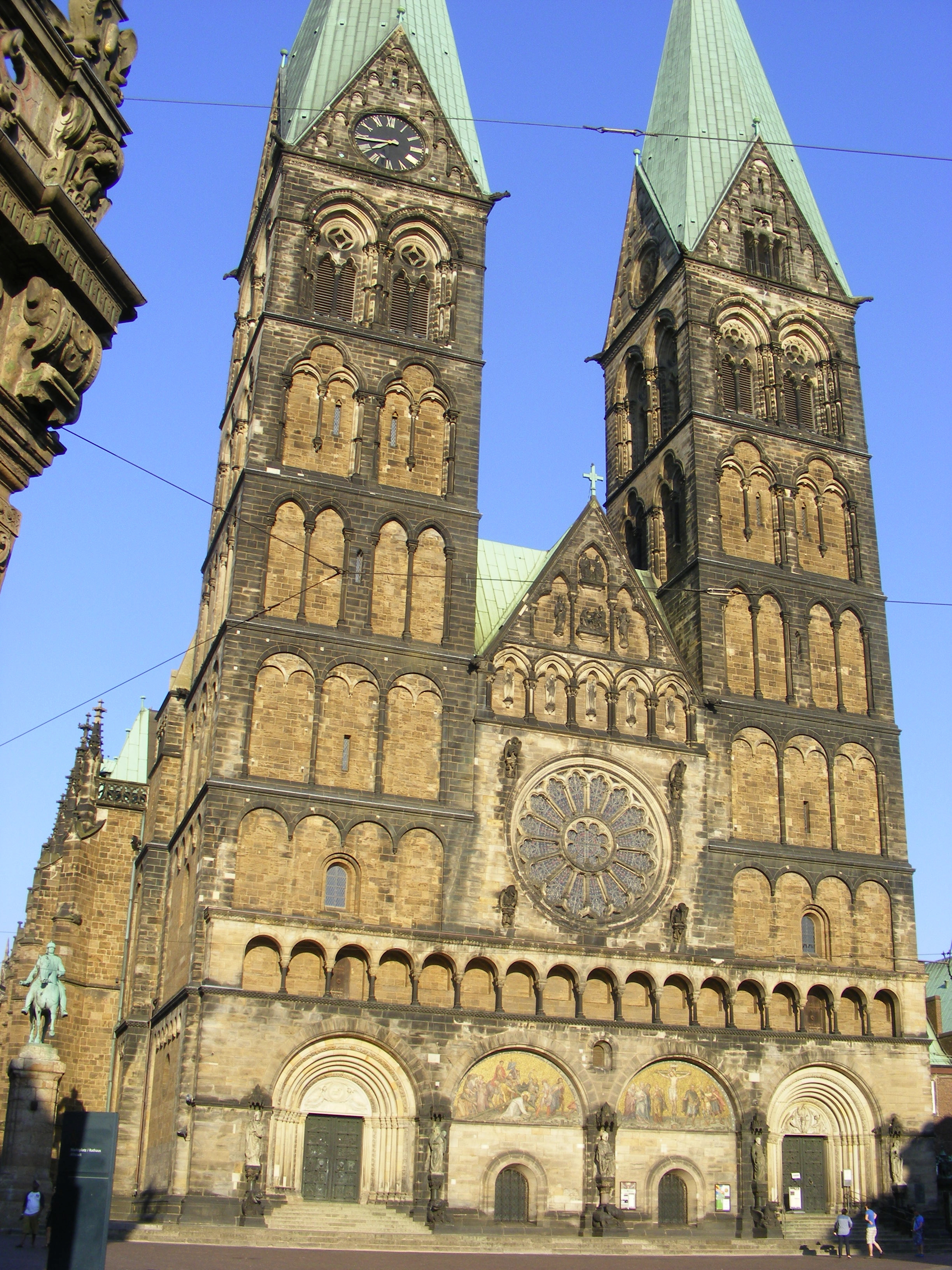
Bremen Cathedral, western façade

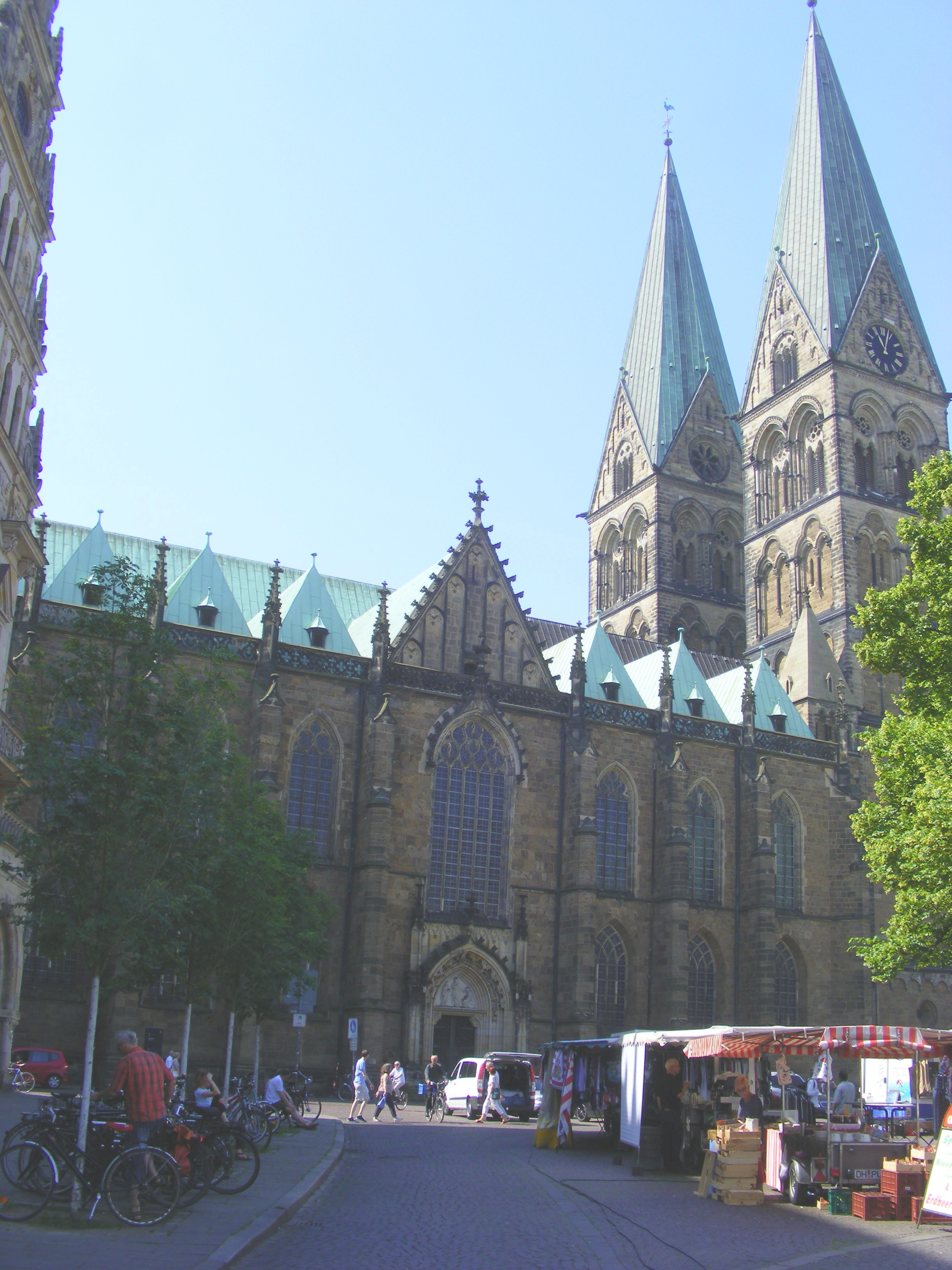
Bremen Cathedral, northern façade

Bremen Cathedral (German: Bremer Dom or St. Petri Dom zu Bremen), named after St. Peter, is a church situated in the market square in the center of Bremen. The cathedral belongs to the Bremian Evangelical Church, a member of the umbrella organization Evangelical Church in Germany. It is the previous cathedral of the former Roman Catholic Prince-Archbishopric of Bremen. Since 1973, it is protected by the monument protection act.

== Periods and materials ==
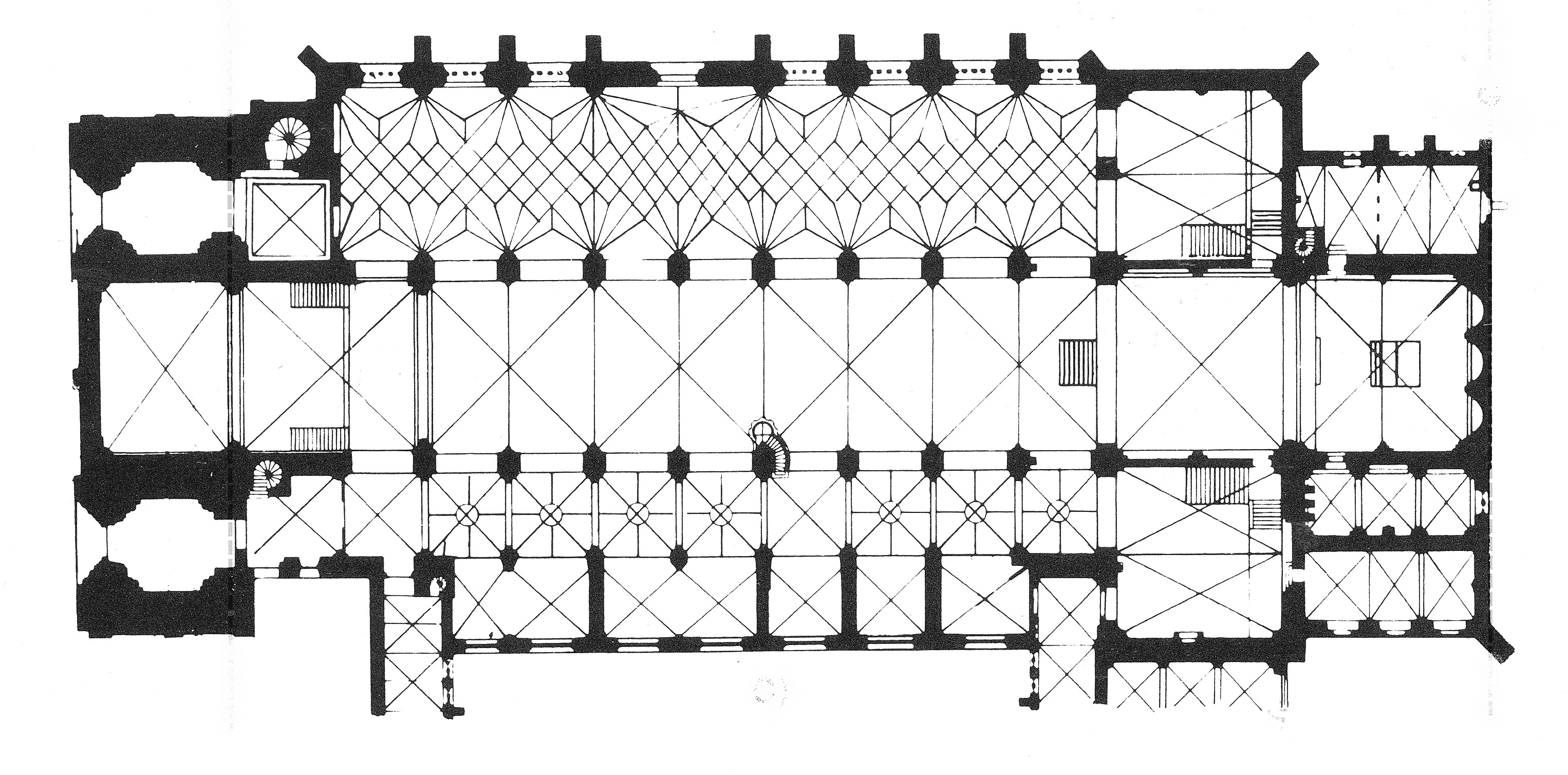
Plan of the cathedral before 1888 (in the south still connected to the cloister, which was destroyed by a fire in 1912)

In general, Bremen Cathedral is a medieval building. The oldest visible structures are the two crypts. The last parts built in romanesque style and in sandstone were the lower storeys of the western façade and the western towers. Since the late 1220s, vaults and walls were erected in bricks, partly hidden by sheets of sandstone. Only the outer wall of the southern row of chapels shows unhidden bricks. St Peter's is one of the largest historic brick structures in Europe, but it comprises too many stone structures to be subsumed to Brick Gothic. During the great restoration of 1888 to 1901, the western towers and most of the western façade were rebuilt relatively close to previous structures. The crossing tower was a new addition, using the medieval crossing tower of Worms Cathedral as an example. The roofs above the transepts and the northern aisle were redesigned.

== History ==
=== Early buildings ===
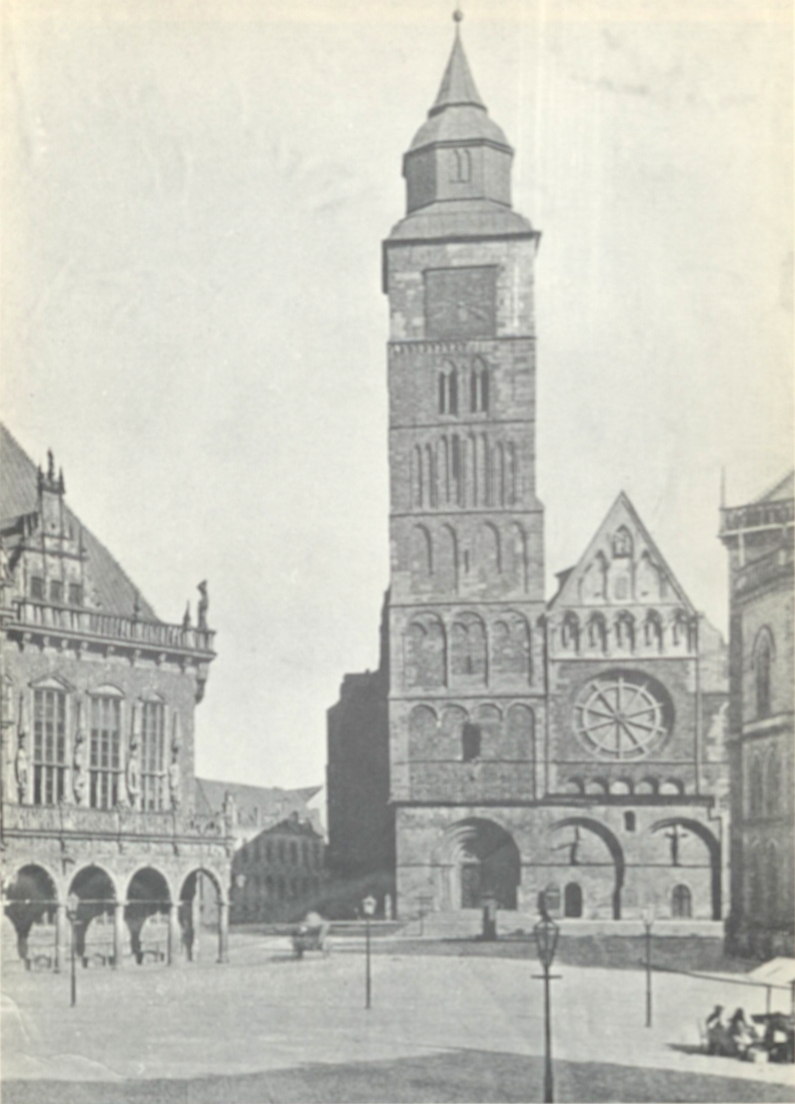
Bremen Cathedral in 1880, the collapsed southern belfry is hidden behind the stock exchange

The first church structure that can be verified on the site of St Peter's Cathedral in Bremen was a timber church on a high point overseeing the Weser River built by Saint Willehad, an early missionary to the Frisians. The church was built about 789 in conjunction with the creation of the Diocese of Bremen, with Willehad as the first bishop. Willehad died the same year.

Just three years later Saxons attacked and burned Bremen and its tiny timber cathedral. No trace of it remains. The see remained vacant for thirteen years until it was reestablished under Bishop Willerich in 805. St Peter's was built as the cathedral church of local sandstone in several stages by Bishop Willerich.

After the sack of Hamburg by the Danes in 845, Bremen became the seat of the combined Bremen and Hamburg Archdiocese under Archbishop Saint Ansgar who held the see from 848 to his death in 865. He was one of the most prominent missionaries to northern Europe and is credited with the beginnings of the conversion of the Danes and Swedes to Christianity. He was succeeded by Archbishop Rimbert.

It is believed that during Ansgar's time the cathedral had a central nave and two side aisles with a choir at each end of the nave, a typical Carolingian church form. There was a cathedral school and cloister.

Early in the tenure of Archbishop Adalbrand (1035–1043) the church was in the process of being rebuilt and enlarged, but in 1041 most of Bremen including the cathedral was destroyed by a terrible fire. The fire also destroyed much of the cathedral library. Bishop Adalbrand ordered the building rebuilt in 1042, but died before it could be completed.

=== Oldest parts of the present building ===
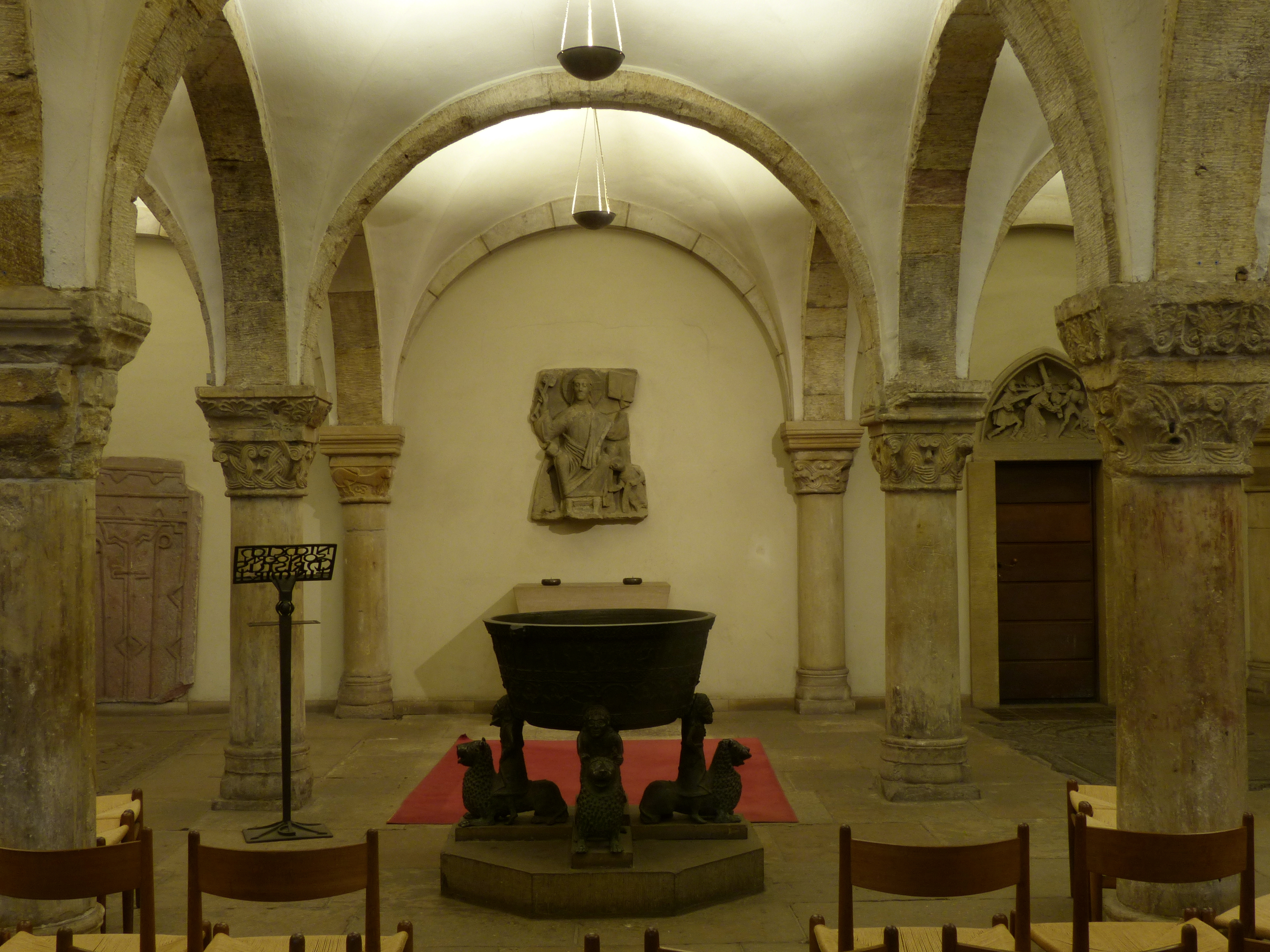
Western crypt

Most of the rebuilding fell to Archbishop Adalbert (1043–1072). The cathedral was rebuilt as a pillared basilica with rounded Romanesque style arches and a flat timber ceiling. Two stubby, flat-topped towers were added to the west front. A crypt was built under the west part of the nave. The building plan was based on the cruciform shape of the cathedral at Benevento in Campania, Italy which Adalbert was familiar with. He also brought craftsmen from Lombardy to make repairs and embellish the cathedral, much to the consternation of local builders and artists. Adalbert ignored the criticism and forced his vision for the cathedral. On Adalbert's orders parts of the fortification of the cathedral district (not the unwalled market town beside) were torn down to provide low-cost stone for the cathedral. Adalbert's short-sightedness resulted in Saxons sacking the city and the cathedral in 1064. Under Adalbert's rule the oldest visible part of today's cathedral was built, the western crypt.

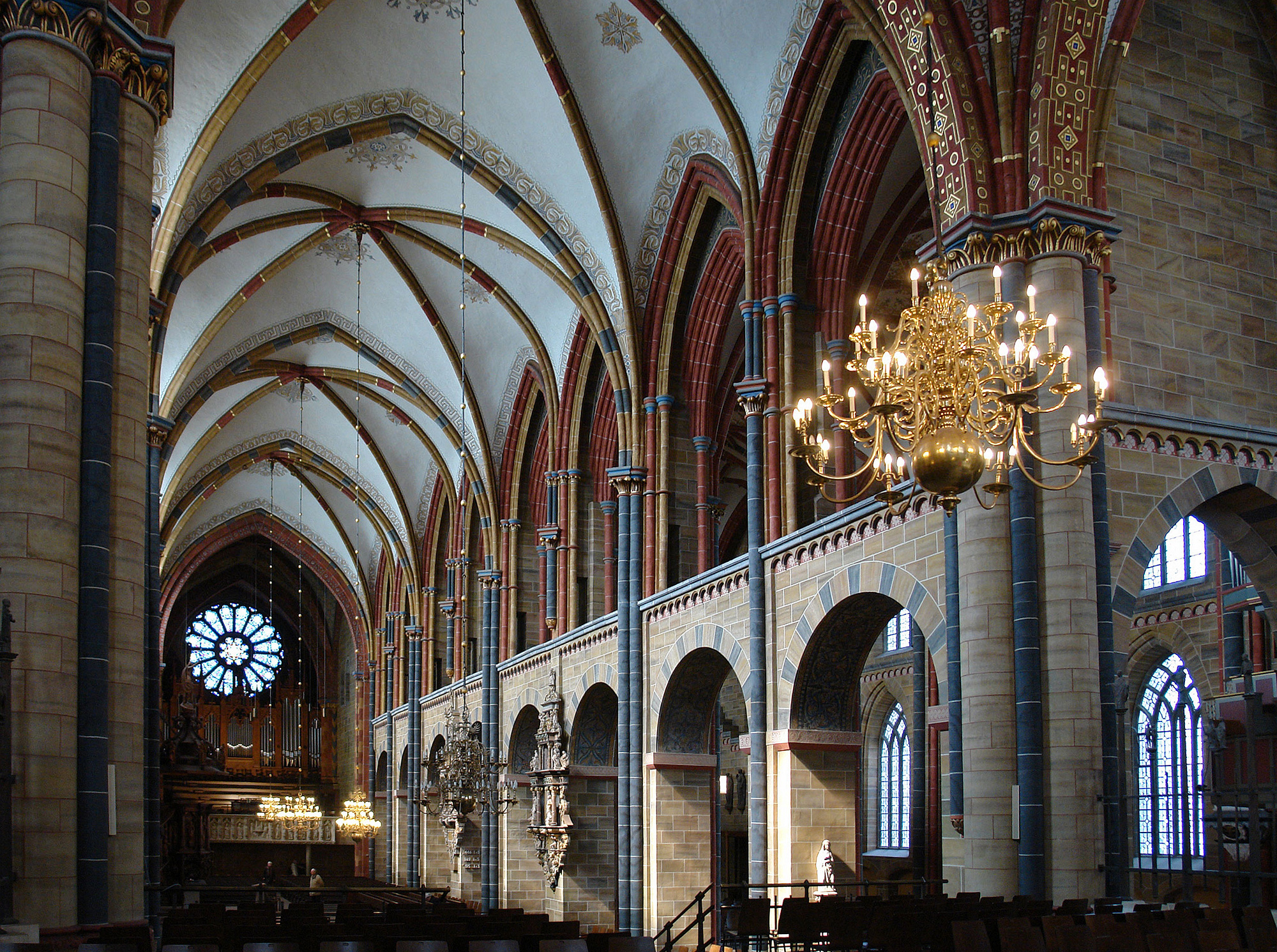
Central nave: on the right the two- storey arcade towards the northern aisle, lower in romance style, upper twin arcades in early & late gothic styles

Under his successor, Liemar (1072–1102), the eastern crypt was built and the cathedral reached almost present-day extent on the ground.

In 1104, the archdiocese lost most of its administrative power to the newly established archbishopric of Lund.

=== Dominant structures of the present building ===
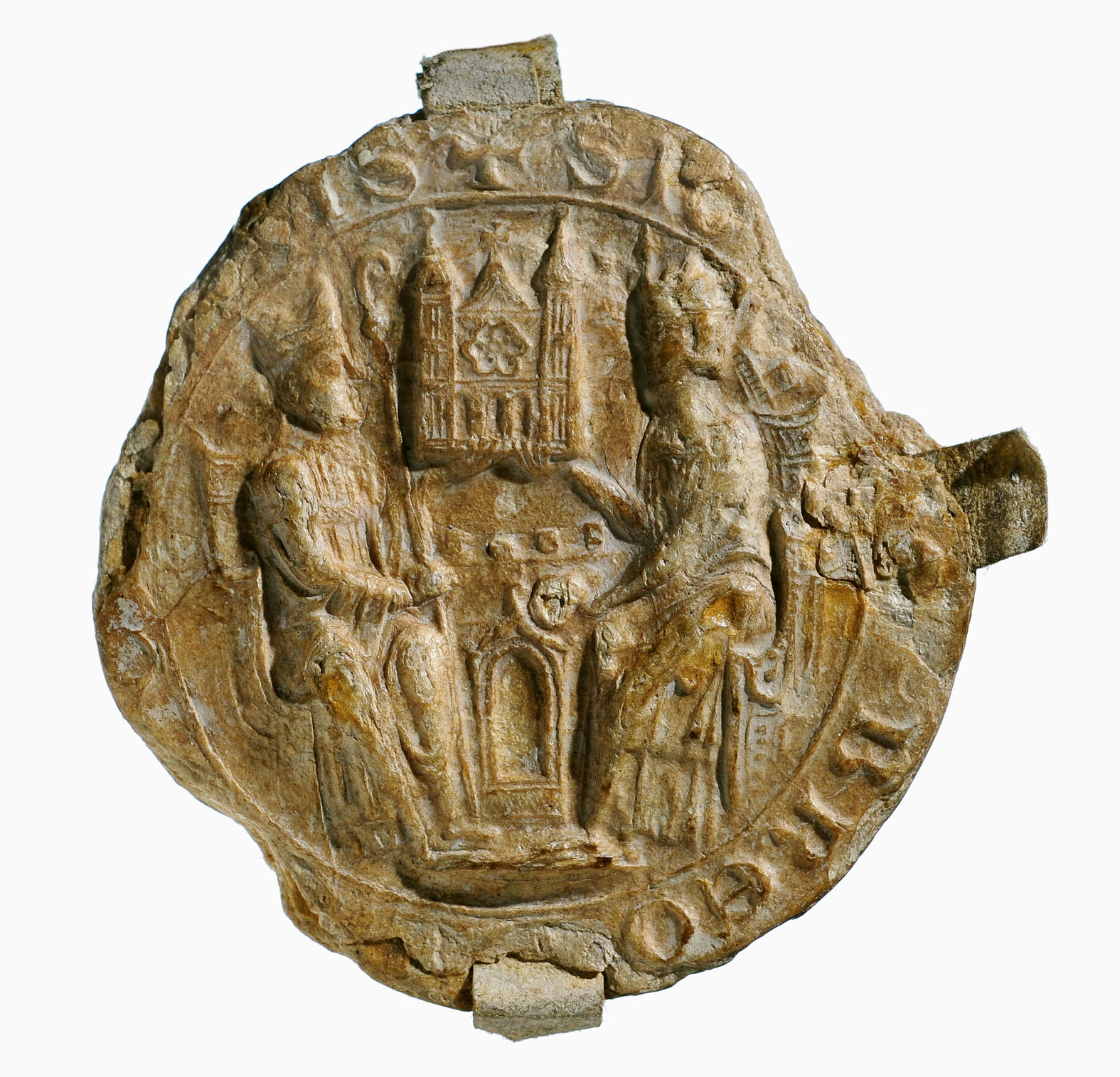
Seal of the City of Bremen from 1230, showing the cathedral with a rose window

During the rule Prince-Archbishop Gerhard II (1219–1258), the conditions for works on the cathedral improved: On Christmas 1223 the rivalry of Bremen and Hamburg was finished by a papal decision, Bremen became the only see of the archbishopric. In March 1224, another papal decree authorized an indulgence campaign to subsidize a "repair" of the cathedral. The construction of the lower storeys of the western façade and towers – in pure romanesque style – may have begun before the decree and even before the onset of Gerhard's rule.

Between the towers, a rose window was added, it has already been depicted in Bremen's first municipal seal, cut in 1230. Than, successively and most of it under the same rule, at first the two westernmost bays of the nave were vaulted (still almost Romance style), then the aisles in very early Gothic architecture, then central nave, choir, crossing and transept in advanced early Gothic style. Differing from the Romance parts, the vaults and new walls were constructed in brick as were many other large ecclesiastic and public buildings in northern Europe.

Central nave and choir have double bays with six sections each. The pillars at their corners are supported by flying buttresses (since 1502–'22 only on the southern side). The pillars of the middling ribs, carrying only one fourth (or eighth) of the weight, have none, except of the choir, where they were added as late as in 1911.

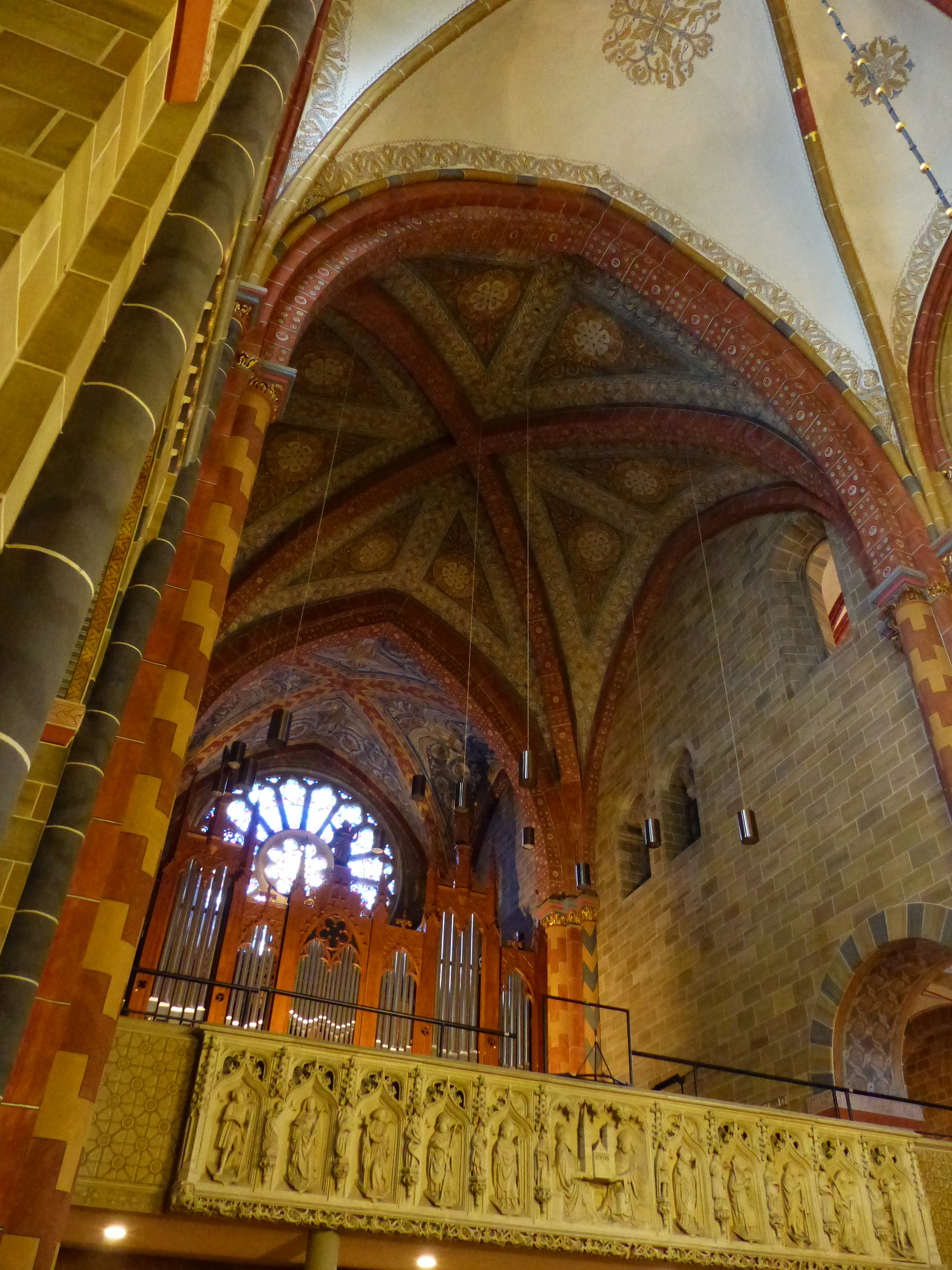
The oldest vaults are above the main organ, in the west.

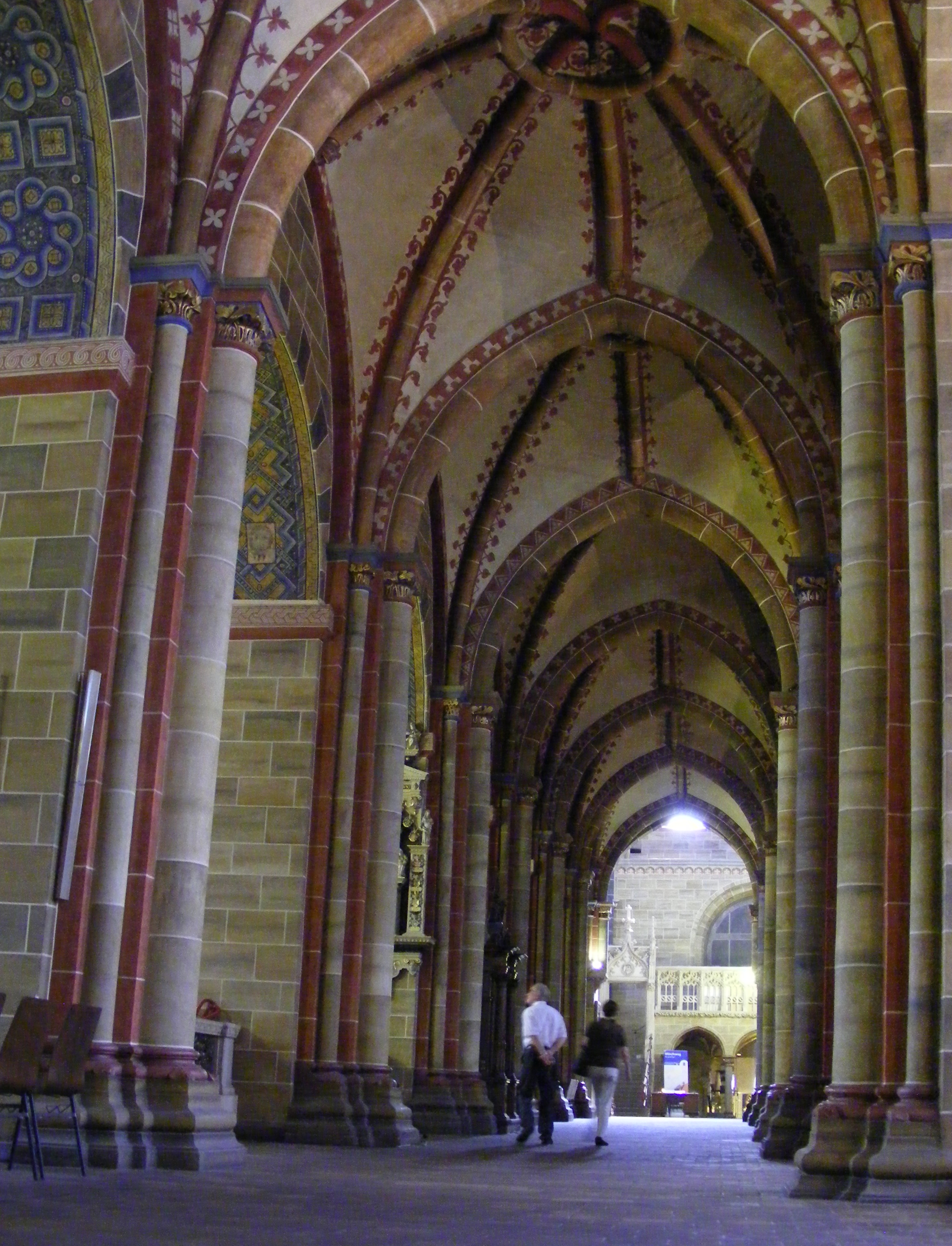
Southern aisle, vaulted before central nave, choir, crossing and transept

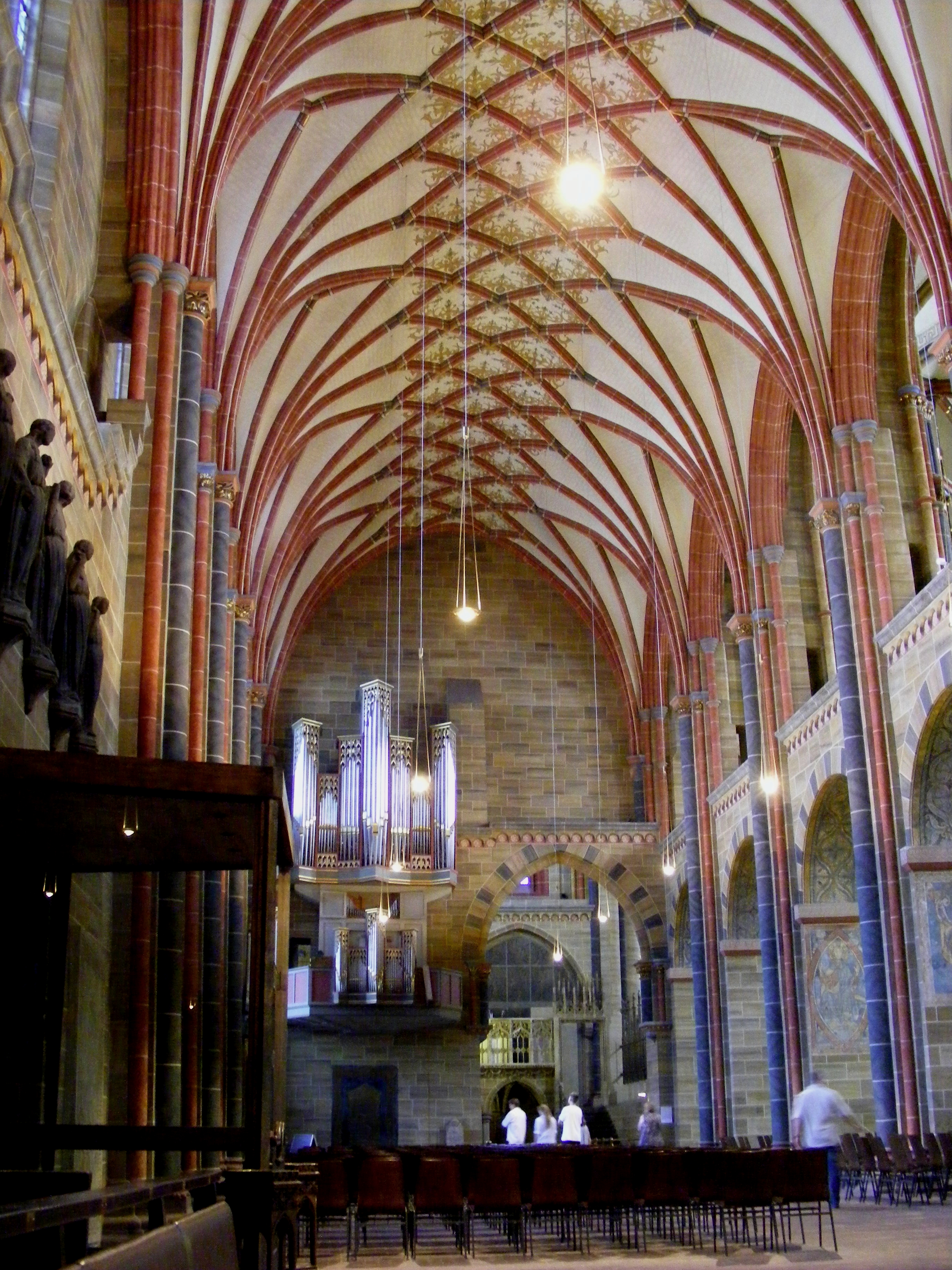
Northern aisle, repaired and raised to the height of the central nave in 1502 to 1522 (late gothic style)

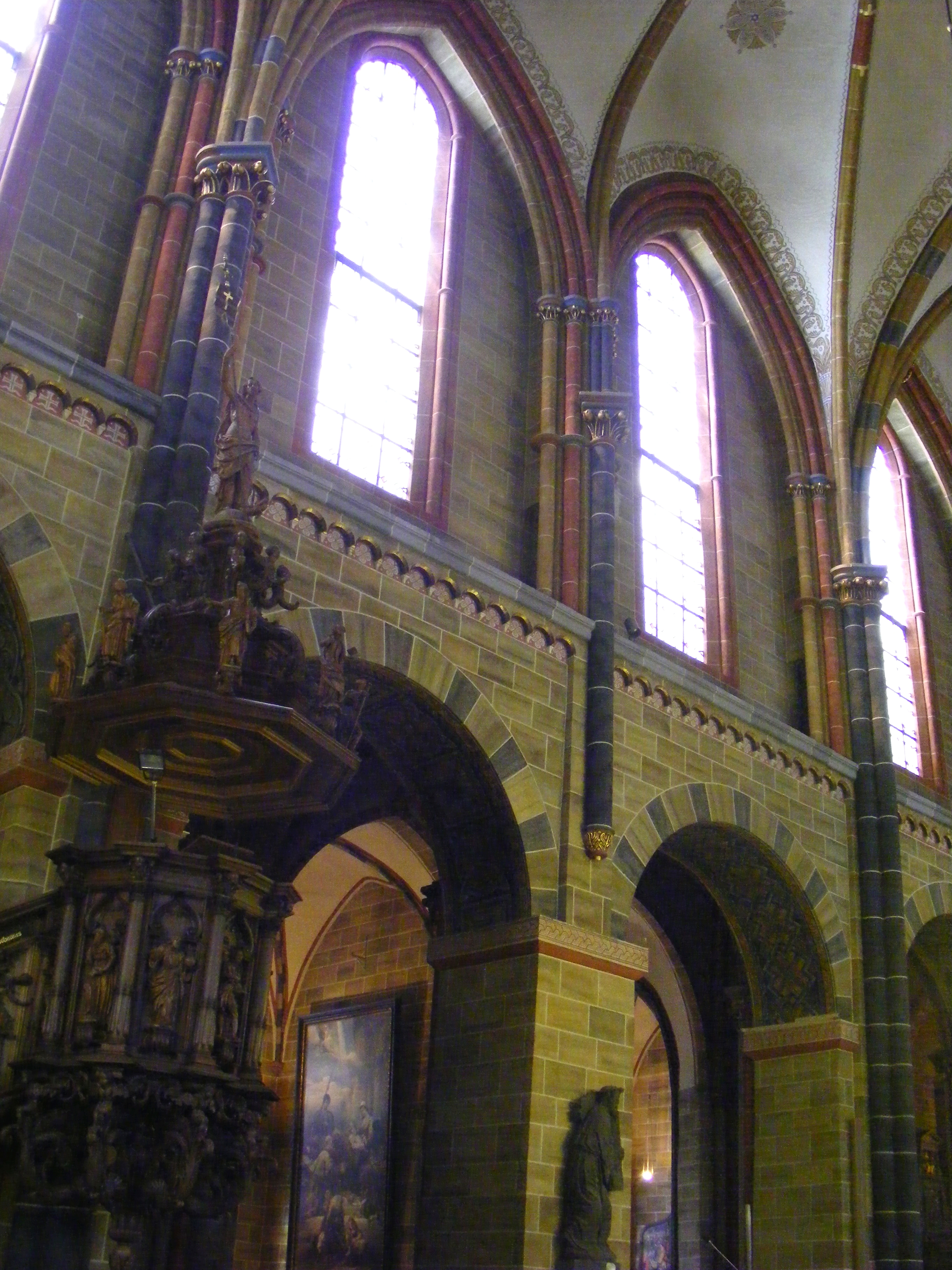
Pulpit of 1638, southern wall of the central nave rather romance: arcade with round arches, no triforium

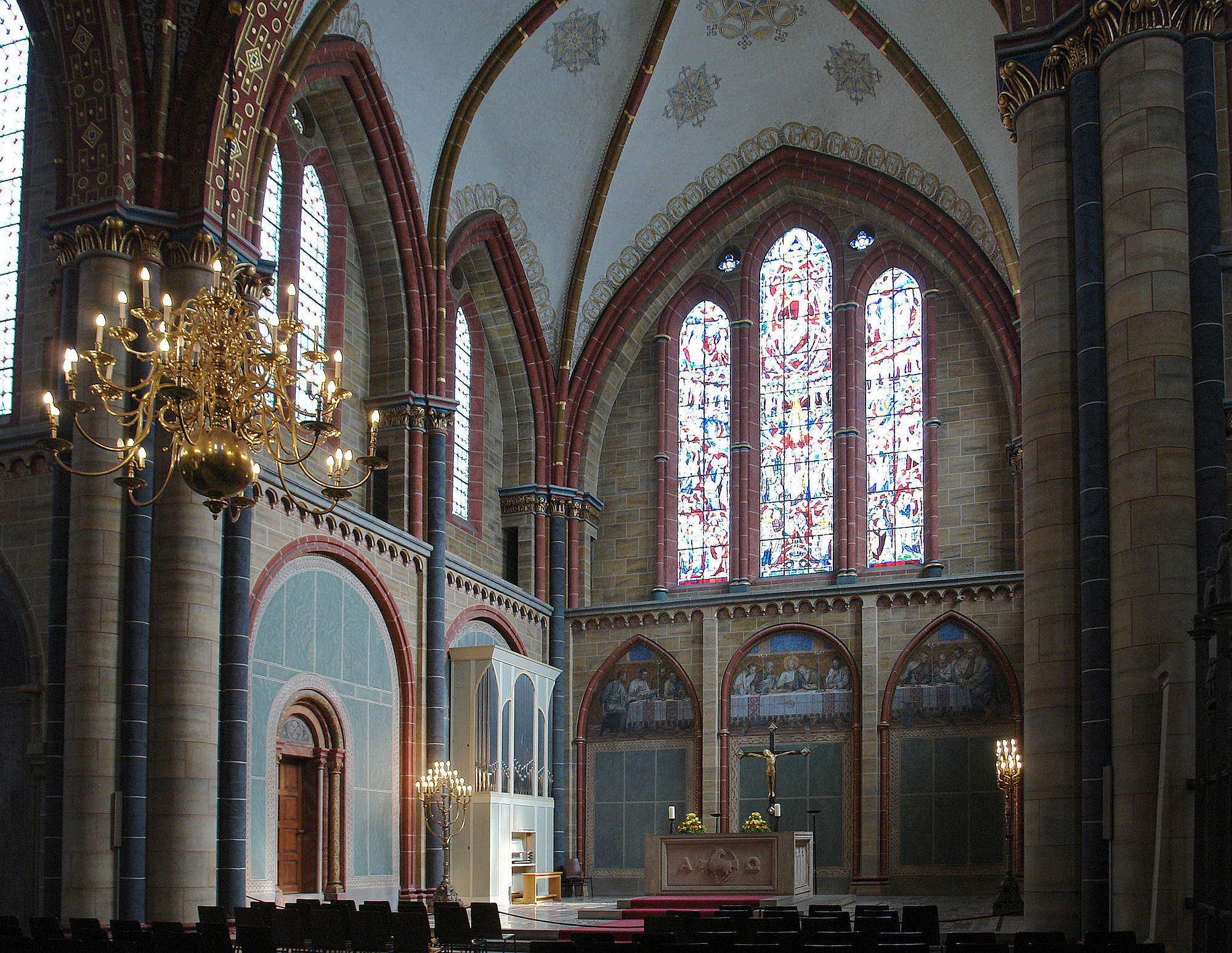
The choir has a romanesque floorplan

At Easter 1334 Prince-Archbishop Burchard Grelle claimed to have found the skulls of the Saints Cosmas and Damian. He "personally 'miraculously' retrieved the relics of the holy physicians Cosmas and Damian, which were allegedly immured and forgotten in the quire of Bremen Cathedral. In celebration of the retrieval Prince-Archbishop and cathedral chapter arranged a feast at Pentecost 1335, when the relics were translated from the wall to a more dignified place." (For the original quotation see the note) Grelle claimed the relics were those Archbishop Adaldag brought from Rome in 965. In about 1400 the cathedral master-builder Johann Hemeling commissioned a shrine for the relics, which has been accomplished until after 1420. The shrine from carved oak wood covered with gilt rolled silver is considered an important mediaeval gold work. In 1649 Bremen's Chapter, meanwhile Lutheran, sold the shrine with the alleged relics to Elector Maximilian I of Bavaria. It is now shown in the Jesuit church of St Michael in Munich.

Under Prince-Archbishop Johann Rode, officiating between 1497 and 1511, the basilica style church was further transformed into a German "High Gothic" style church with a new northern nave. Several chapels were added and even more ambitious plans were made for the church.

While the municipality of Bremen had gained more and more independence from the archbishopric, the cathedral remained under the control of the chapter and the archbishops. The municipality was divided in four parishes. Even the laic inhabitants of the cathedral immunity had a special parish church, Saint Willehadus chapel. The cathedral was the church of the clergy and for special religious celebrations and special events of the archbishopric. The cathedral and its district were included by the municipal fortifications, but politically they formed an exclave.

=== Protestantism in Bremen ===
When the Protestant Reformation swept through northern Germany, the first Reformed sermon in Bremen was held in 1522, and in 1534 the city established a Protestant rule of churches. The cathedral chapter was still catholic and closed St Peter's cathedral, after on Palm Sunday of 1532 a delegation of Bremen's revolutionary Council of the 104 men had forcefully interrupted a Catholic mass and prompted a pastor to hold a Lutheran service. The Roman Catholic Church was condemned as a symbol of the abuses of a long Catholic past by most local citizens and the building fell into disuse and then disrepair. In 1547 the chapter, meanwhile prevailingly Lutheran, appointed the Dutch Albert Hardenberg, called Rizaeus, as the first Cathedral preacher of Protestant affiliation. Rizaeus turned out to be a partisan of the rather Zwinglian understanding of the Lord's Supper, which was rejected by the then Lutheran burghers, city council, and chapter. So in 1561 – after tremendous quarrels – Rizaeus was dismissed and banned from the city and the cathedral shut again its doors.

While the majority of Bremen's burghers and city council adopted Calvinism until the 1590s, the chapter, being simultaneously the body of secular government in the neighbouring Prince-Archbishopric, clung to Lutheranism.

=== Tower disasters ===
On 27 January 1638, the southern belfry, that had already looked unstable for more than a century, collapsed causing severe damage to surrounding buildings and killing eight people. Its lower storeys received a flat roof.

Also in 1638, the Prince-Archbishopric's Lutheran Administrator Frederick II reopened St Peter's as a Lutheran place of worship, while meanwhile all other churches in town had become Calvinist. In 1642, a Lutheran Latin School opened at St Peter's. Just eighteen years later, lightning struck the northern tower and burned the roof, which collapsed into the nave destroying the roof. The walls of northern tower were quickly rebuilt, covered with a simple pyramidal roof. The southern tower suffered a second collapse and remained an open ruin for almost two and a half centuries.

=== Interior development ===
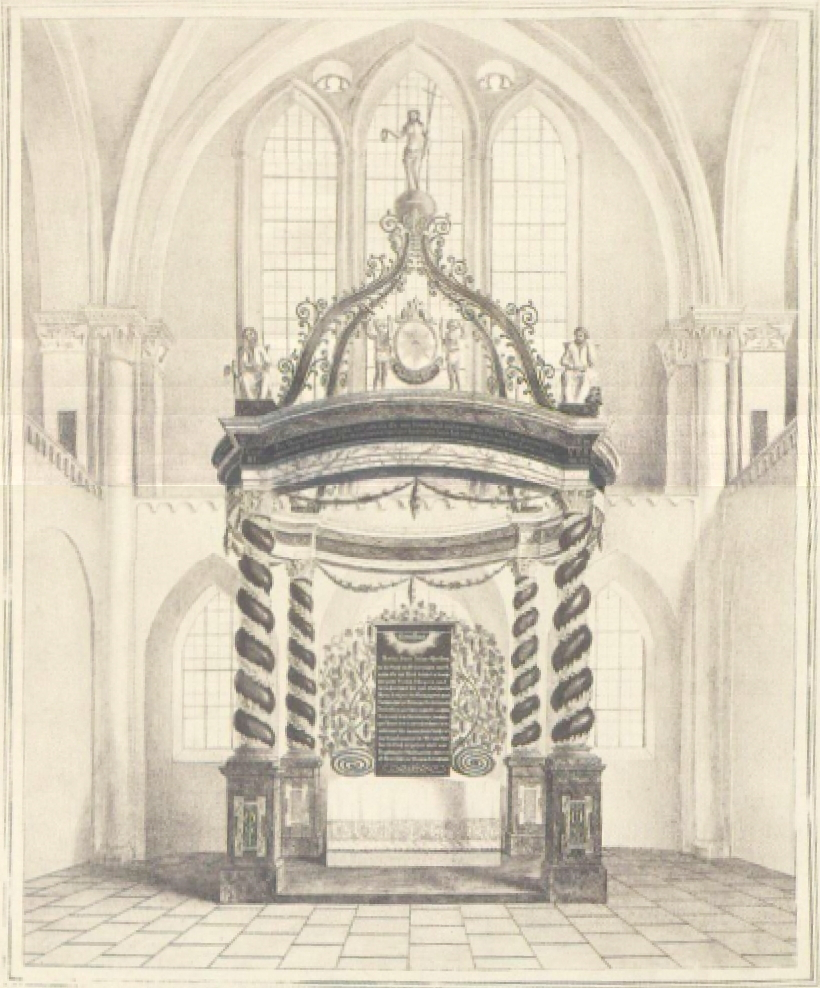
Baroque altar with a canopy, 1694/96 – 1839

Though the outer appearance of the building remained quite poor for more than two centuries, the importance of the church increased. The Lutheran community in the walls of Bremen lacked the status of a parish, but due to immigration from the Lutheran states around Bremen, time by time it became the largest religious group in the city. In administrative matters, the Lutherans that joined the services in the cathedral, at the same time were members of the Calvinist parishes of the municipal districts, where they lived.

To get space for the increasing audience of the services, some galleries were built inside the central nave and the northern aisle. Between 1693 and 1698, Arp Schnitger installed a huge organ that would be played until 1847, one of the most valuable equipment, Bremen Cathedral ever had. in the same period, in 1694/96, the Lutheran church received a new main altar with a canopy, resembling St. Peter's Baldachin in Vatican Basilica. About 80 years later, the western rose window had to be changed (for a simpler one), in order to prevent damages of the organ caused by humidity.

=== Municipal rule ===
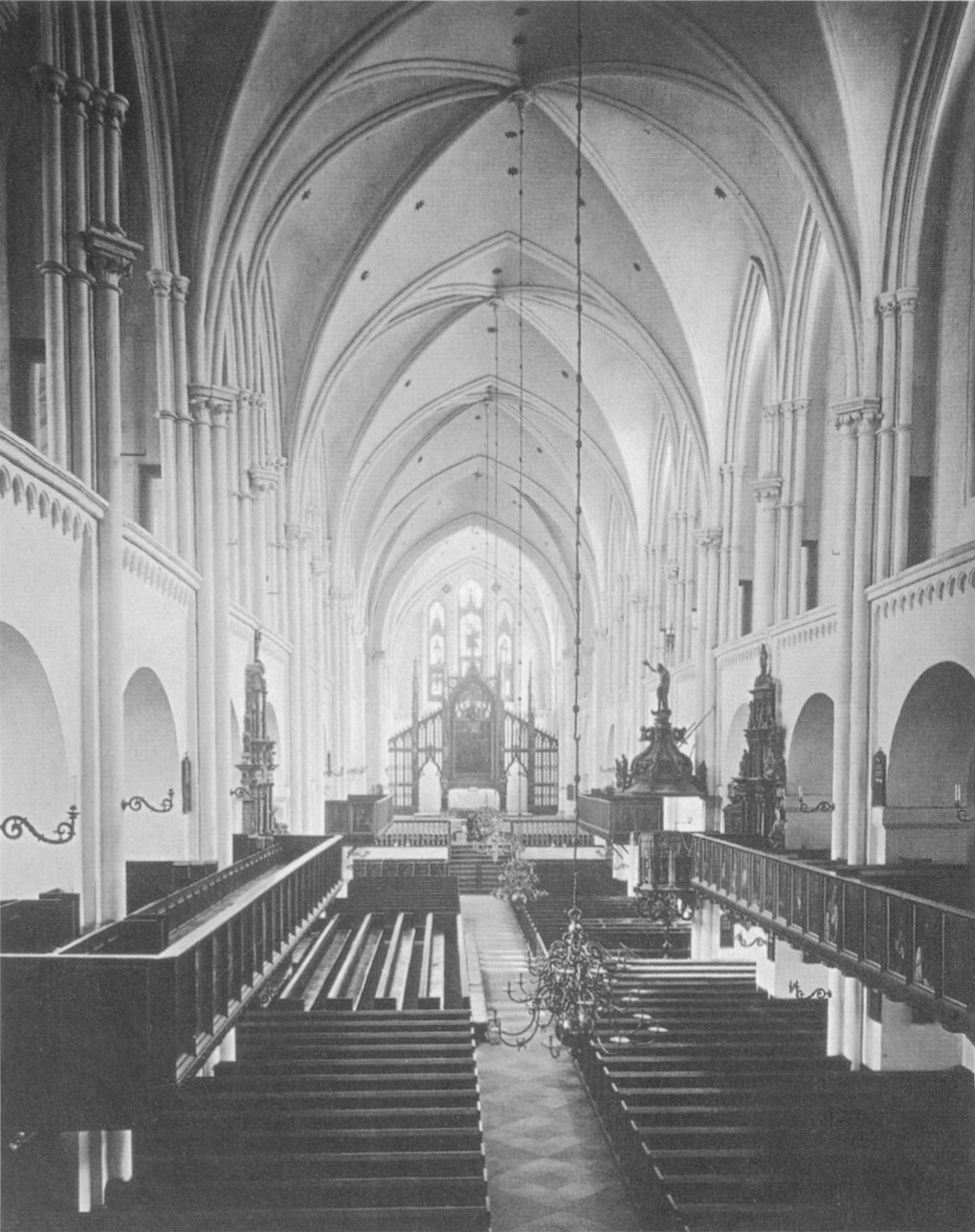
Central nave and Gothic Revival altar in 1876

In 1803 the cathedral immunity district with St Peter's, meanwhile an extraterritorial enclave of the Electorate of Hanover, which had gained the duchy of Bremen-Verden in, was incorporated into the Free Imperial City of Bremen. Its burgomaster Johann Smidt, a devout member of the Reformed (Calvinist) church, confiscated the considerable estates of the Lutheran congregation. The representatives of the Lutheran congregation, led by the cathedral preacher Johann David Nicolai, started to fight for its right to exist. In 1810, facing the annexion of Bremen by the French Empire, the city council agreed to the establishment of a cathedral parish, this way preventing a French confiscation of the church's properties. But the new parish wouldn't gain full equality of right with the Calvinist parishes before 1830, asserted by a majority of Bremen's Calvinist senators (government members) against the expressed will of Smidt.

[In 1873 the Calvinist and Lutheran congregations in Bremen reconciled and founded a united administrative umbrella, the still existing Bremian Evangelical Church, comprising the bulk of Bremen's citizens.]

In 1817, the city council ordered the withdrawal of some small houses, attached to the northern wall of the cathedral. But the consequent reparations of the wall had to be paid by the parish's construction fund. After more than two centuries of economic decline, for the free city of Bremen investments in its nautic and other transport infrastructure had priority to the reconstruction of the cathedral. Therefore, during the 3rd to 9th decades of the 19th century, urgent renovations had to be paid from the construction fund, and embellishments from gifts. Since 1822, some innovations of the interior were done. The abundance of stalls was reduced to a functional density. Unfortunately, some most valuable medieval stalls were destroyed that way. In 1839/40, a new main altar in Gothic Revival style was installed, and 1847 to 1849 a new organ. In the 1860s, the cathedral got its first coloured stained glass windows after the Reformation.

=== Restoration ===
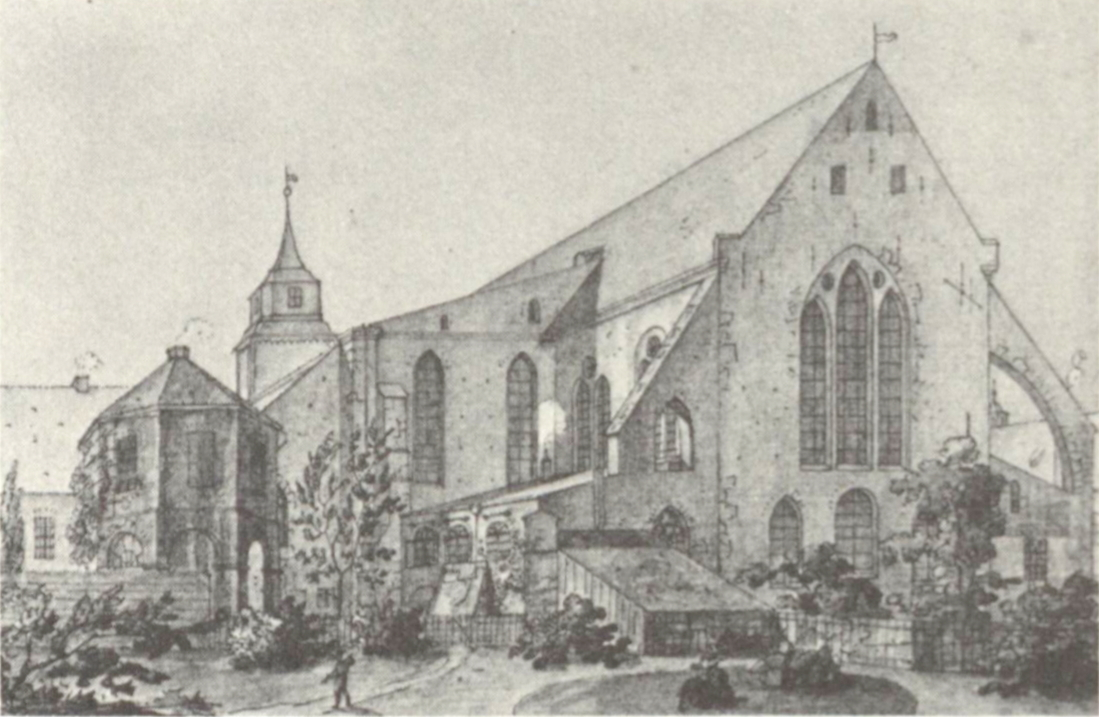
Choir and transept at about 1820

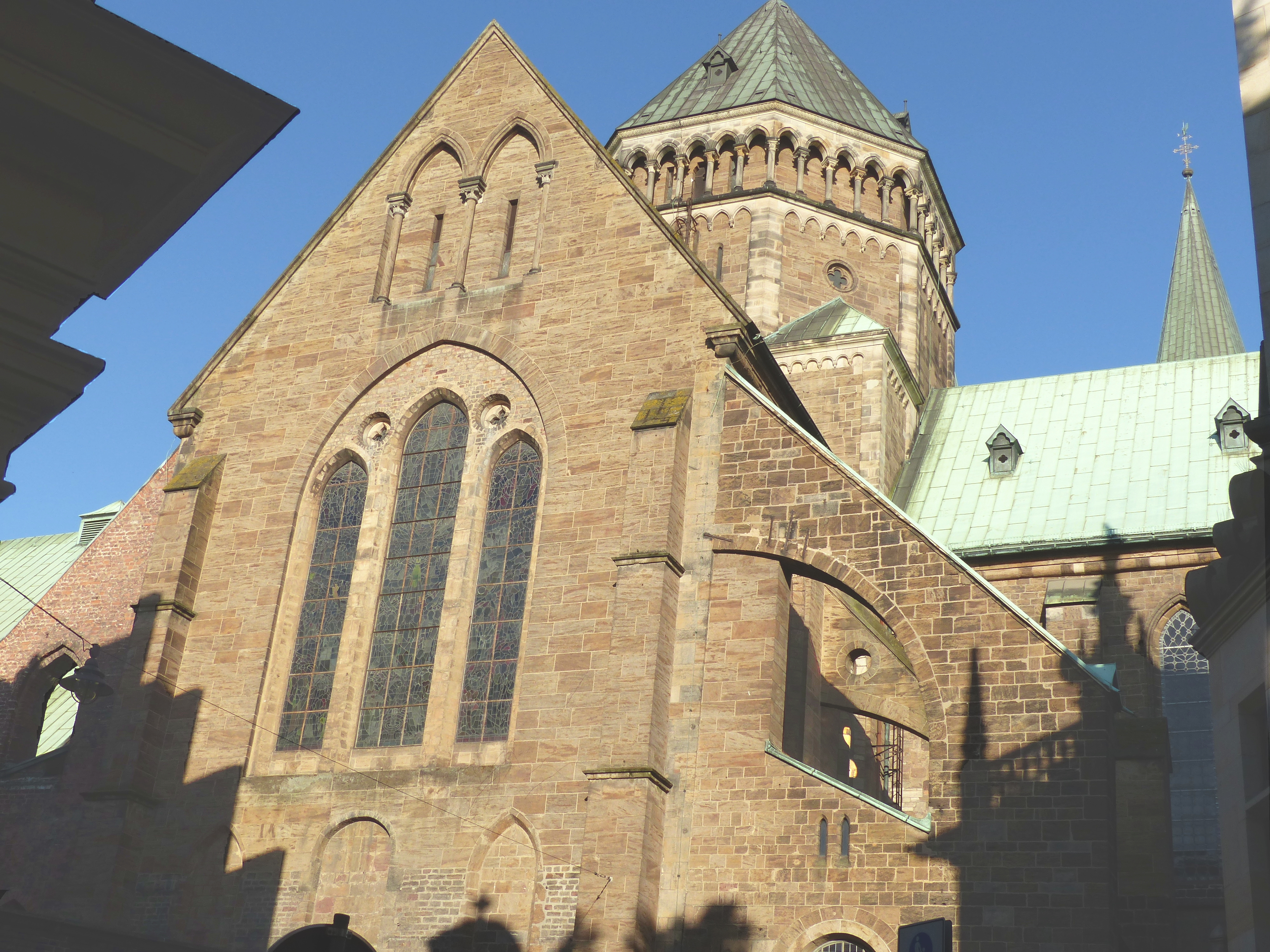
Choir, crossing tower and transept today

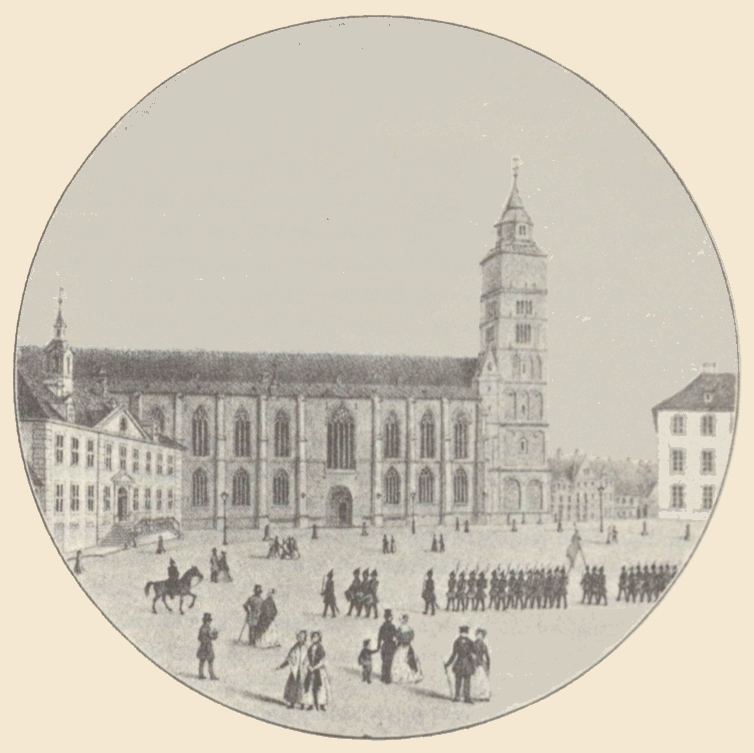
Northern side in mid 19th century

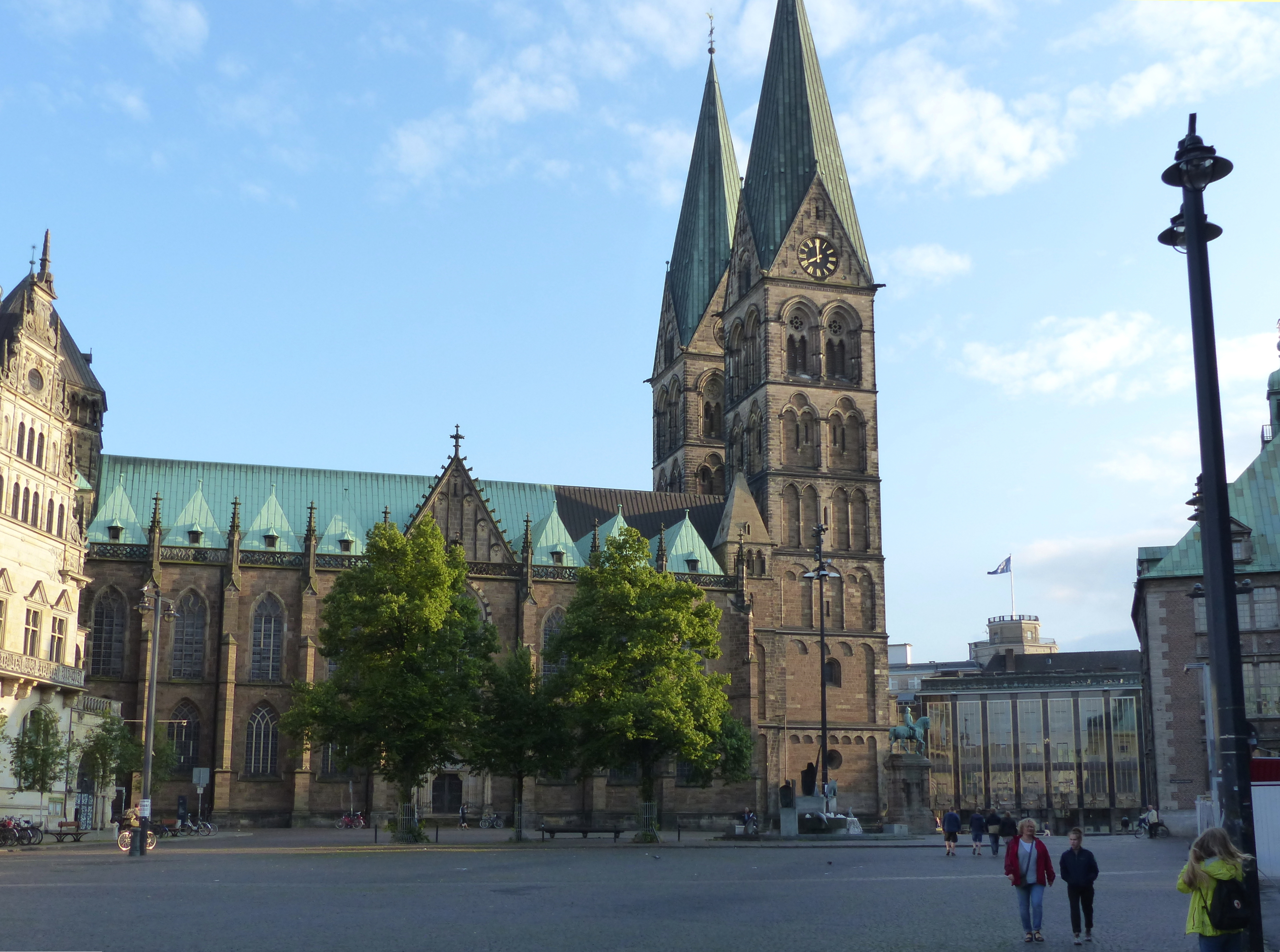
Northern side today

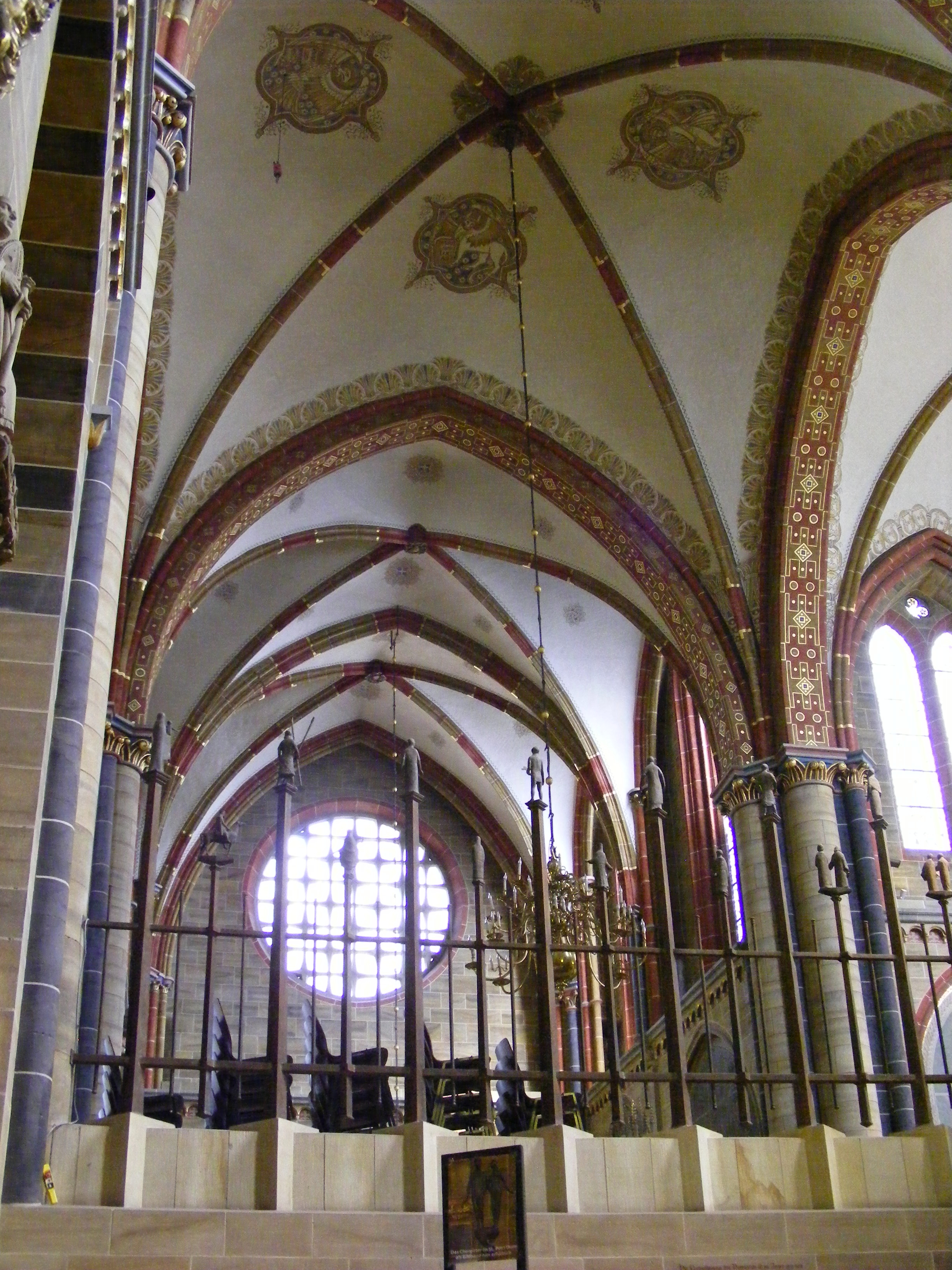
The crossing: original medieval arcs & vaults on 19th century pillars

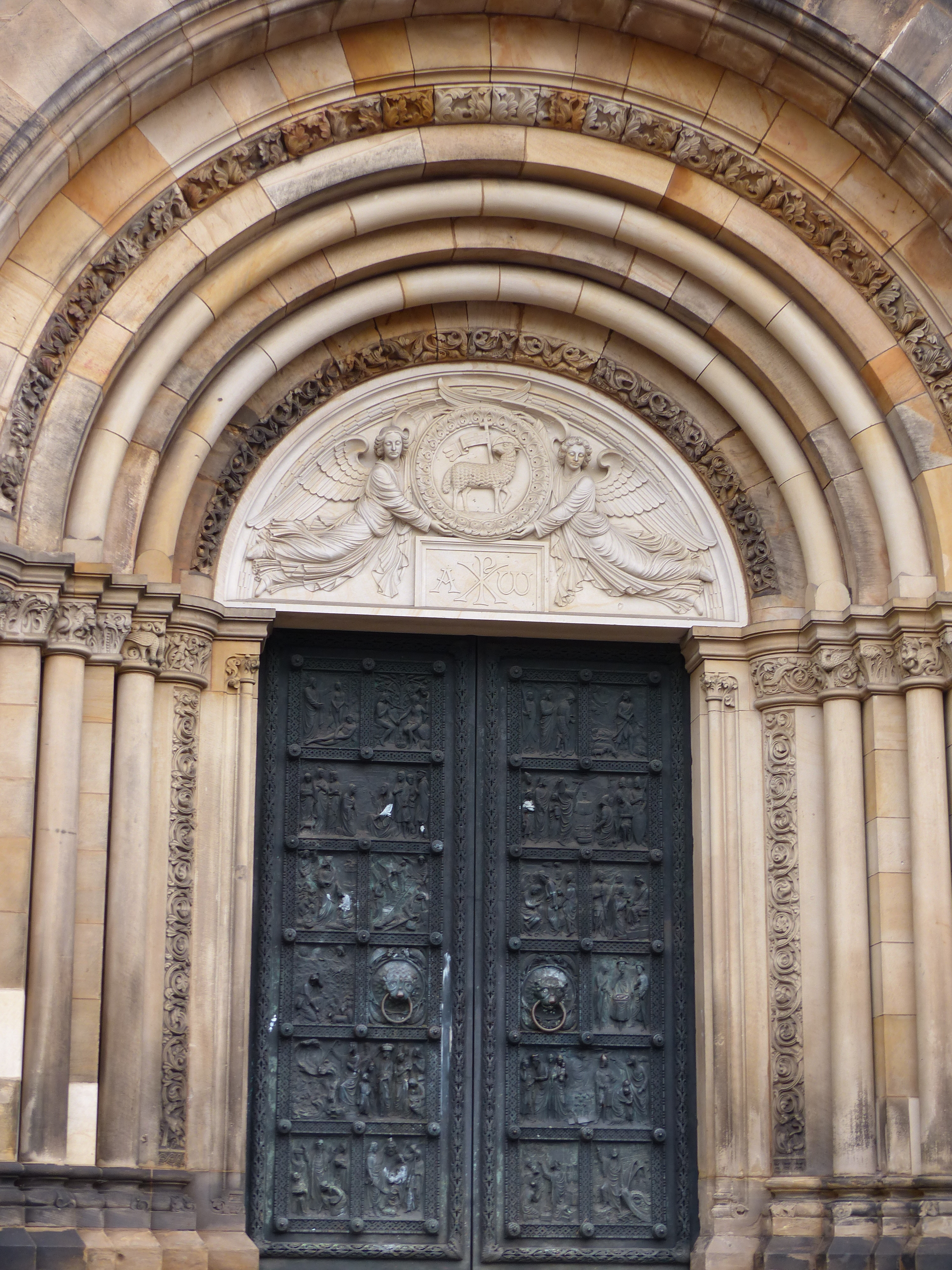
Left door: the arch is a replique, tympan and bronze door are creations of 1891

By the 1880s the citizens of Bremen decided that the cathedral should be restored to its medieval glory. The idea was predominantly promoted by Franz Schütte. Money was raised for the restoration of the building and work began in 1888. Reconstruction continued off and on until 1901 when the church reopened. The restoration was done close to the status before and old pictures, but with a few additions in Romanesque Revival and Gothic Revival style. The whole concept was developed by Max Salzmann. The towers were raised to their present height and completed in 1892. The interior of the church was restored in the Gothic style making it difficult to see the changes in style that occurred over time.

The northern tower that had collapsed in the 17th century was newly erected from its foundations, but using recent structures of the northern tower and old depictions of the cathedral as an example. Of the northern tower it is unknown even to the authorities concerned today, if the lower four storeys were kept or pulled down and rebuilt almost identically. The upper storeys were redesigned a bit. The mosaics in the two central arcs of the façade were new. The gallery above the entrances was restored a bit more solid, and the rose window a bit more decorated than they had been.

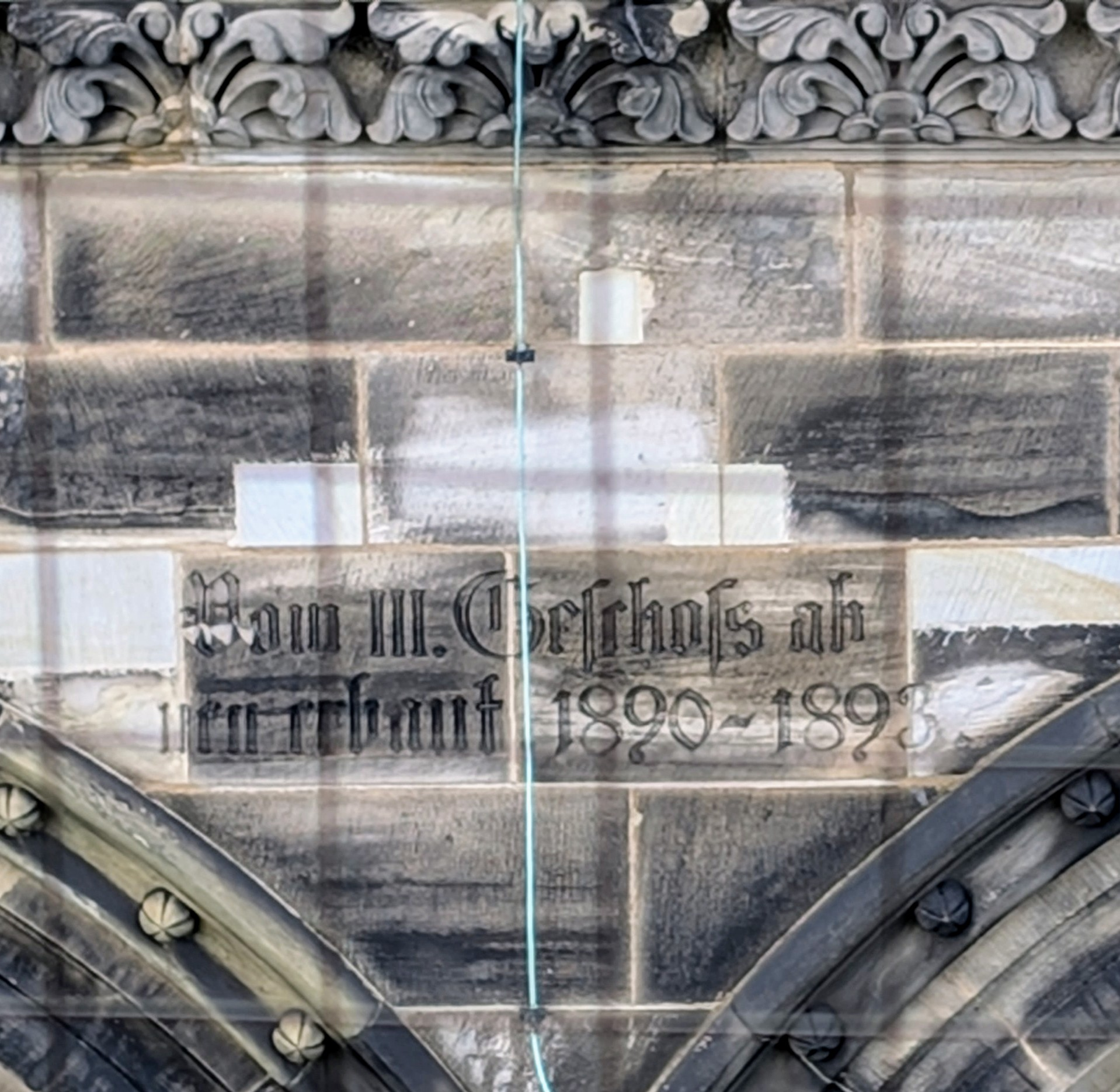
Bremen Cathedral Northern Tower Inscription Reconstruction 1890 - 1893

On the northern façade the gables of the transept and above the Brautportal ("Bride Door") were new, and the Bride Door itself was redecorated, now it has Gothic Revival design.

The addition of the crossing tower was a challenge of engineering, the four columns of the crossing had to be displaced by more stable pillars, but the medieval vaults were kept.

Inside, the walls were repainted in a Neo-Byzantine style.

=== World War II and new repairs ===
The church was struck by a fire bomb during an Allied air raid in 1943 and damaged repeatedly until 1945 when a high explosive bomb caused the collapse of parts of the vaults of the northern aisle. Due to that gap, it was feared that the building could collapse totally. However, all roofs and windows were closed quite soon, and by 1950 the vaults were reconstructed and the whole building stabilized. From 1972 to 1981 the church was restored once again. During those works, the chance was used for an intensive archaeological examination of the foundations and the graves under the floor. The only change of structures was the new rose window of the northern transept, but many of the Neo-Byzantine paintings disappeared. The design of the stained glass windows is totally new.

== Interior ==
=== Altars and pulpit ===
On the eve of the reformation, the cathedral contained fifty altars. Now, there are four altars and one pulpit. The main altar is in the choir. For smaller services, there is a central altar beside the pulpit in the middle of the northern side of the central nave. It is decorated with a torso of a sculpture of Christ, carrying his cross, saved from northern façade. The two other altars are in the crypts. In the western crypt, nowadays used as baptismal chapel, it is decorated with the oldest sculpture of the cathedral, Jesus Christ as a ruler with Saint Peter's key.

The pulpit installed in 1638 was a gift to the people of Bremen from Queen Christina of Sweden, whose troops – in the course of the Thirty Years' War – had already captured the Prince-Archbishopric of Bremen, and aimed at gaining the city too. The pulpit remains in its original location.

=== Organs ===
Bremen has a long-standing tradition of fine organ music. As early as in 1244, the cantor was ordered to take care of the organ. Notations are preserved since 1526. In 1528, the construction of a new "large organ" was begun. From 1698 to 1843 the famous organ built by Arp Schnitger, one of the Baroque period's best known organ makers was the main organ. Its replacements, the Schulze organ and then the Wilhelm Sauer organ, one of the largest in northwest Germany. The cathedral today has five organs in different parts of the cathedral and continues the long tradition of great organs and organists.

=== Choir stalls ===
Up to the nineteenth century, the cathedral choir, which still exists today, was situated in the crossing and divided from the transepts by lateral walls. On both sides of this choir, there were two files of choir stalls. In 1826, they were withdrawn, as they had no view to the pulpit. Unfortunately, most of them were used as firewood. But nine of the carved stall wings were saved by the cathedral's structurer. They had been created in the 1360s. Now they are exposed in one of the chapels. Each of them has a program, showing connected stories from the bible.

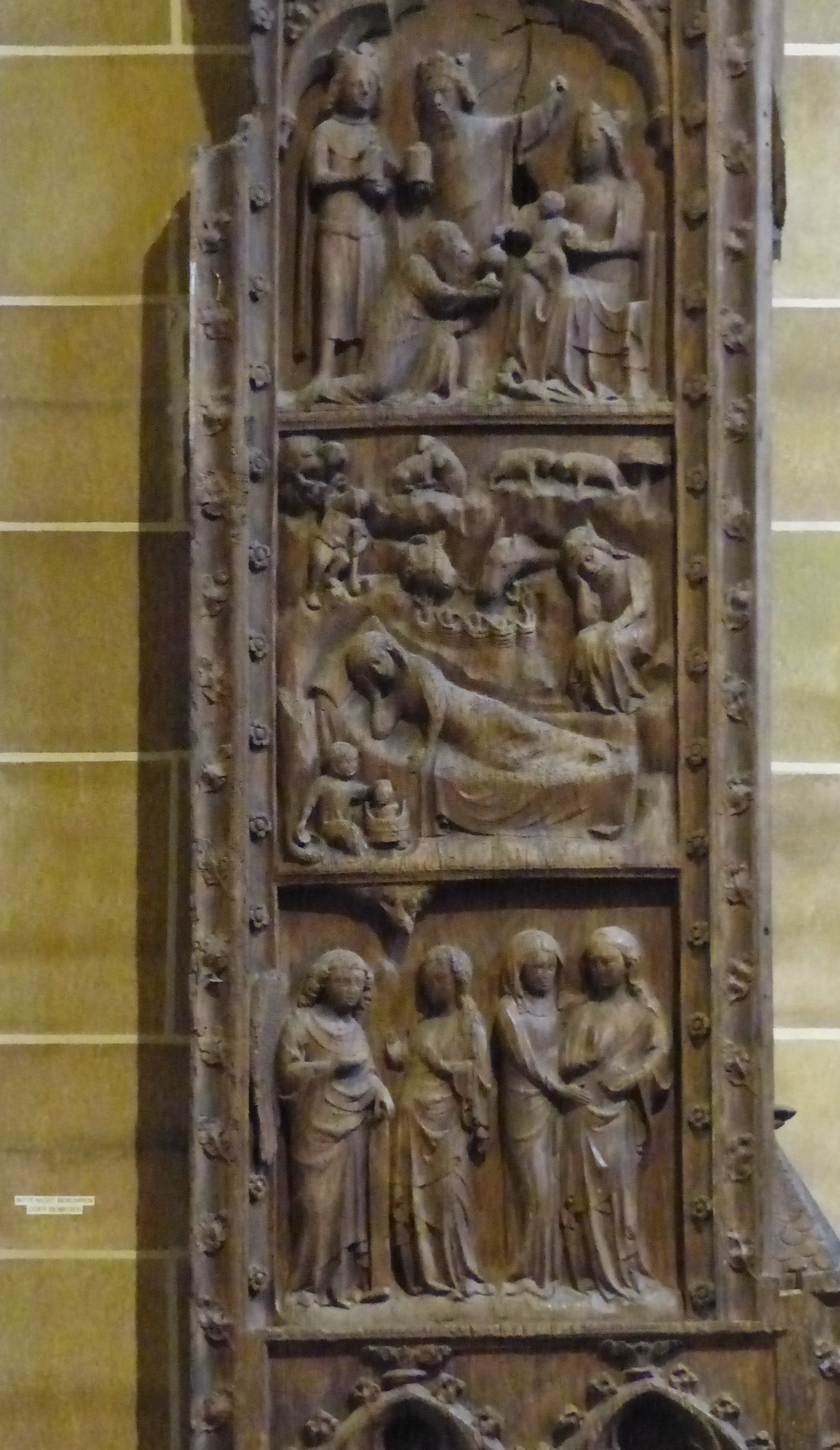
Stall wing, ascendingly: announcement, birth and adoration of Jesus

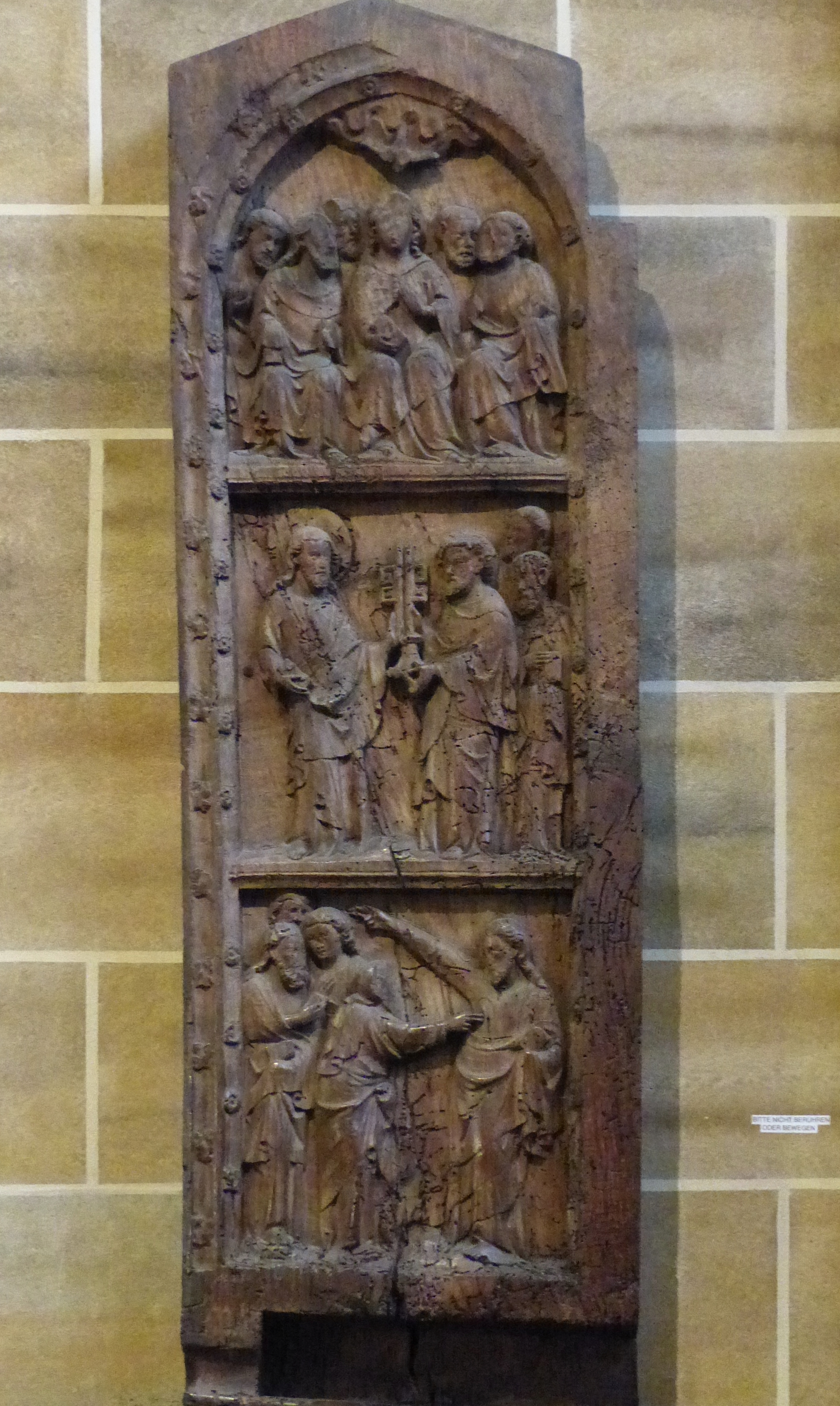
Stall wing, ascendingly: Jesus and Saint Thomas, Jesus and Saint Peter, the miracle of Pentecost

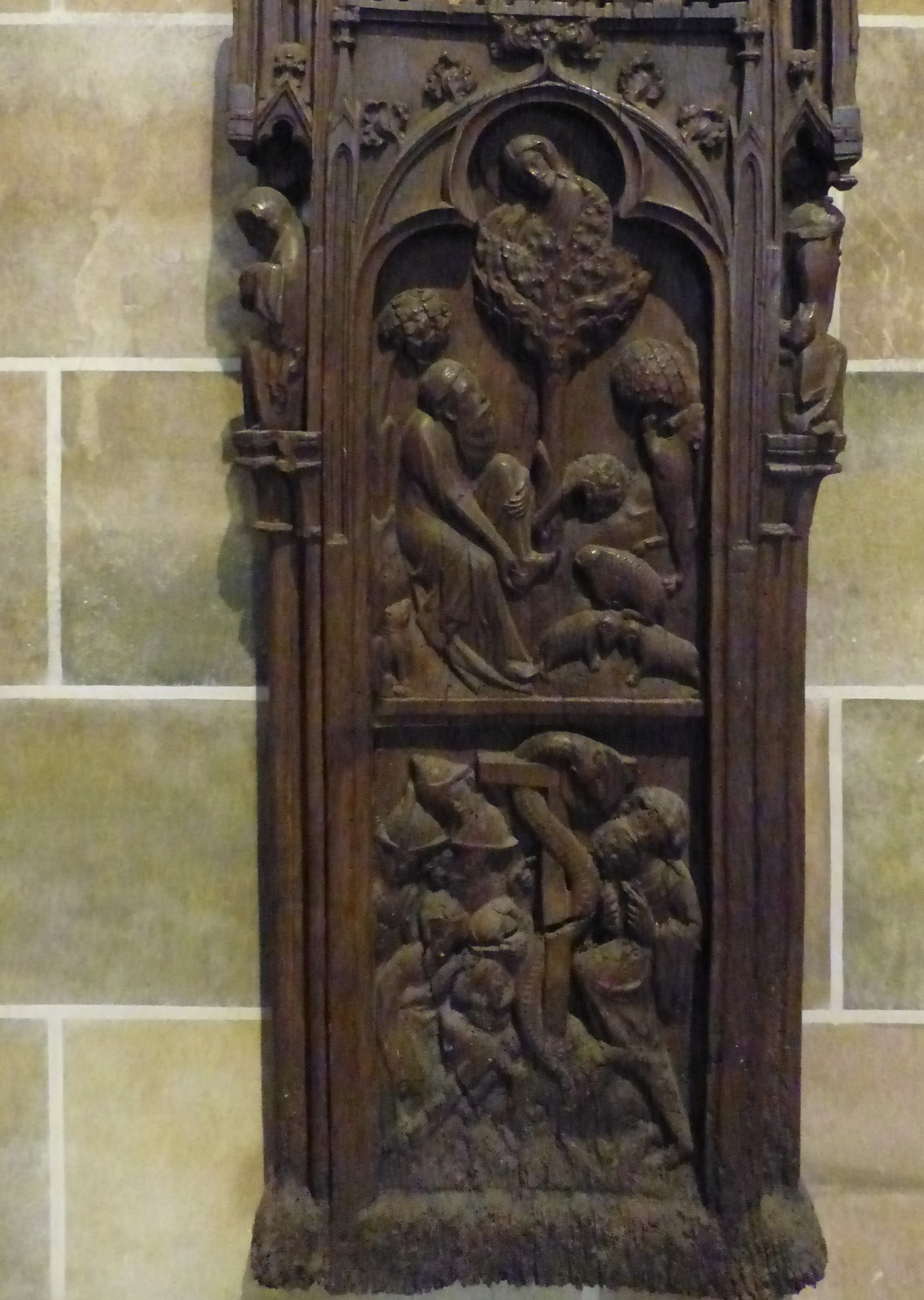
Stall wing of the paradise and the snake of temptation

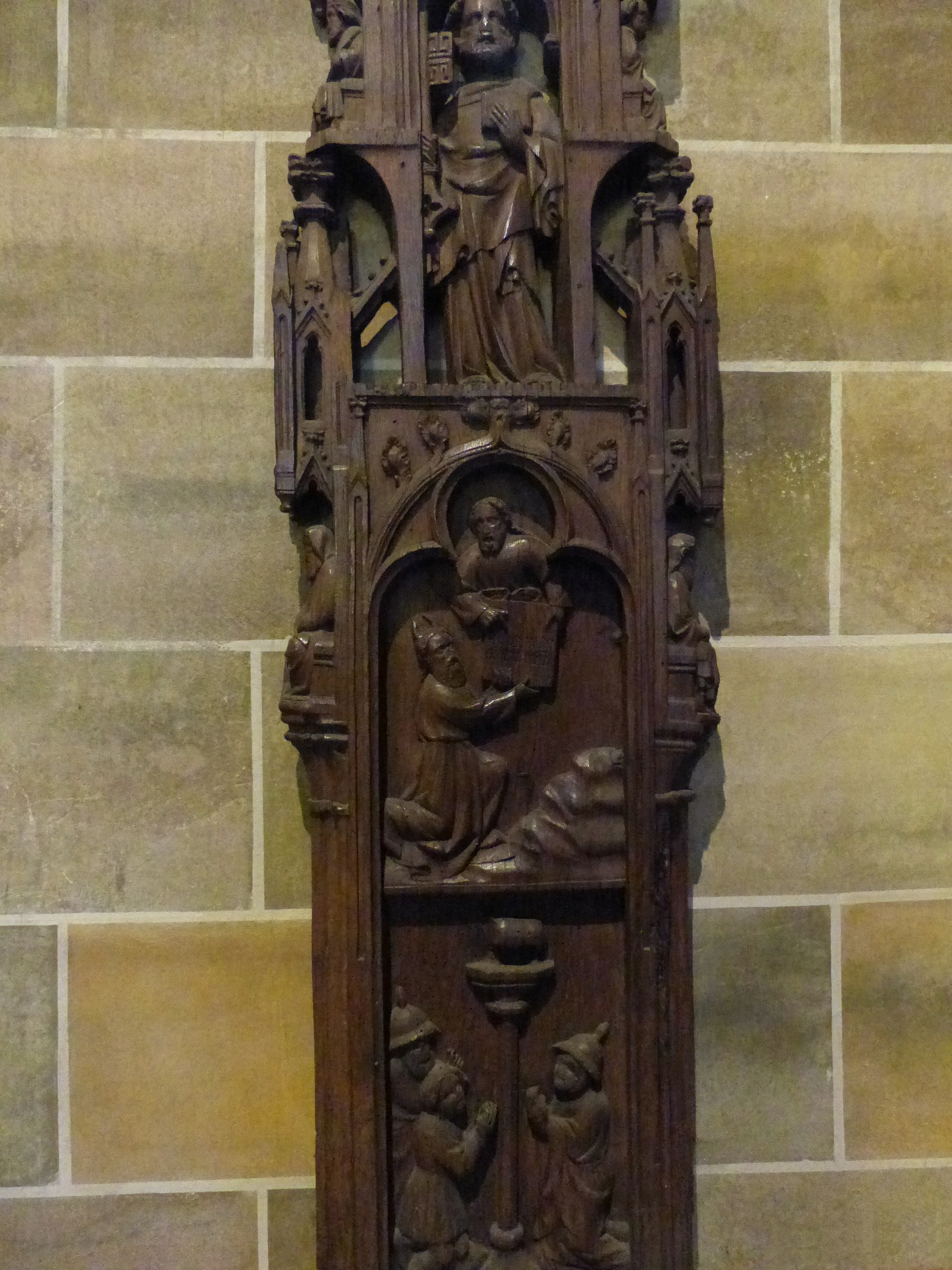
Stall wing, showing Saint Peter, Moses on Mount Sinai and the Golden Calf

=== Burials ===
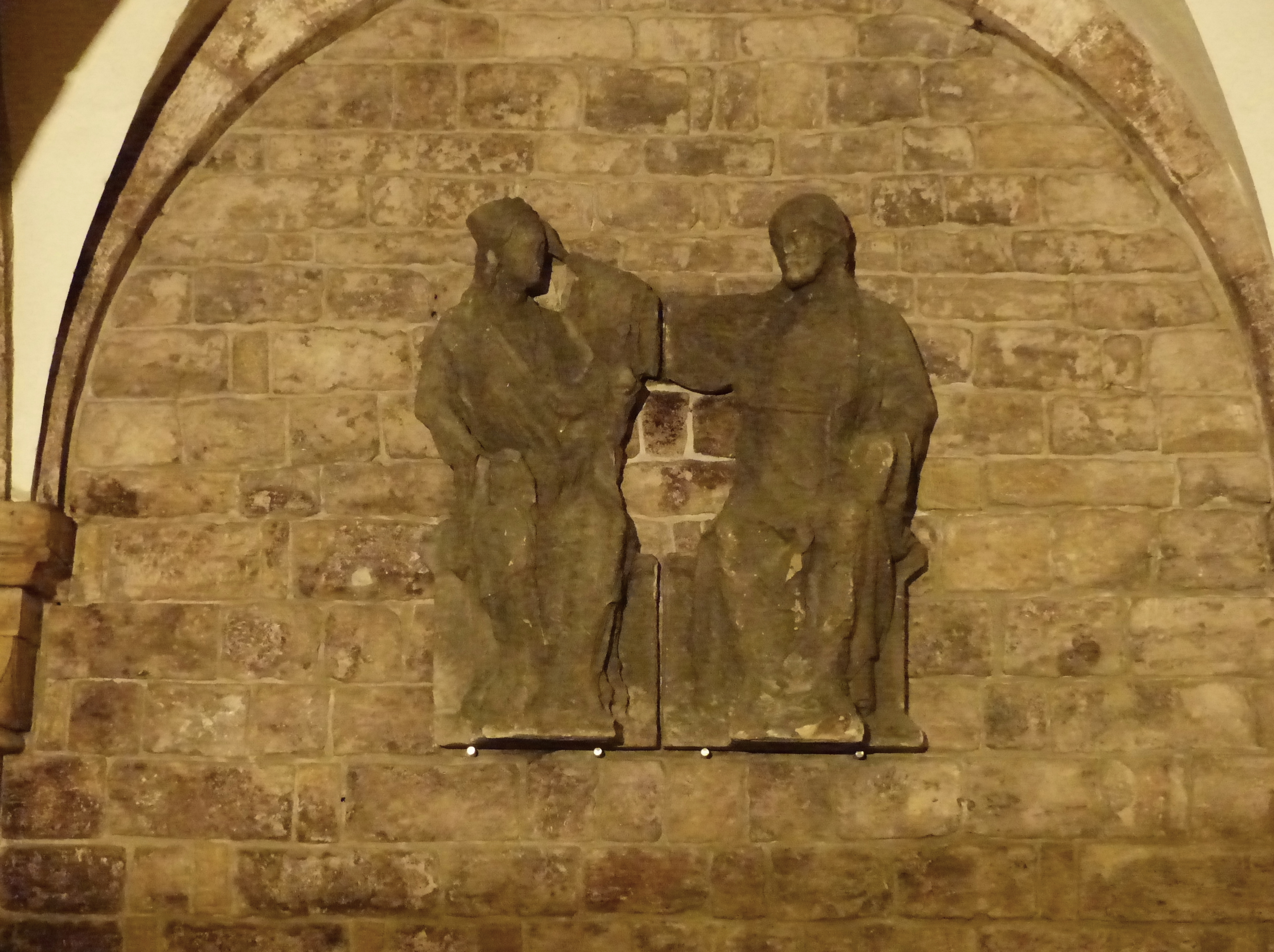
St Mary's coronation from the western gable in the eastern crypt; outside there is now a free replique

- Willehad of Bremen
- Emma of Lesum
- Unni (archbishop) – his head

=== Crypts and tombs ===
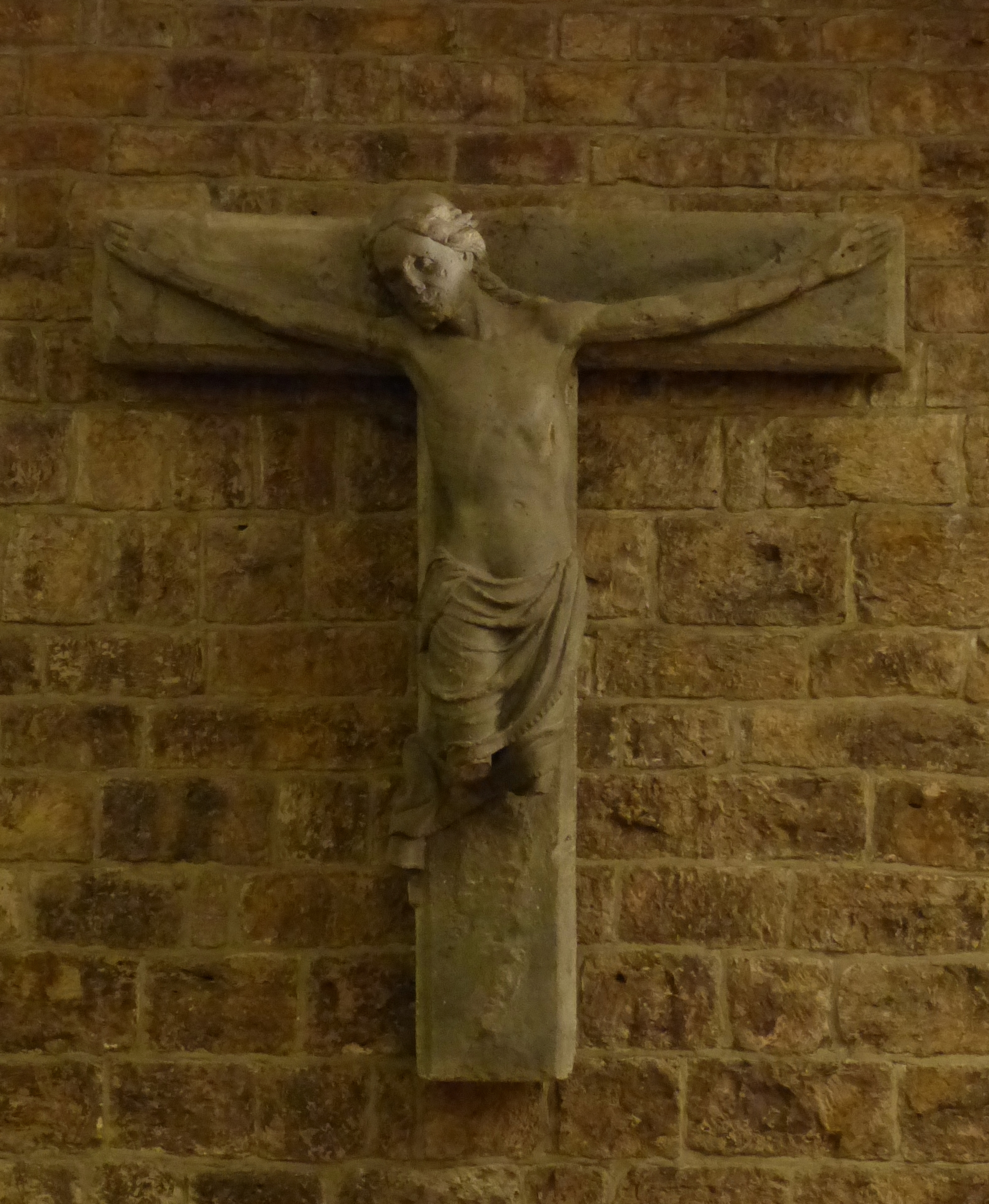
Relic of the crucifixion sculpture from the western arcade, nowadays in the eastern crypt

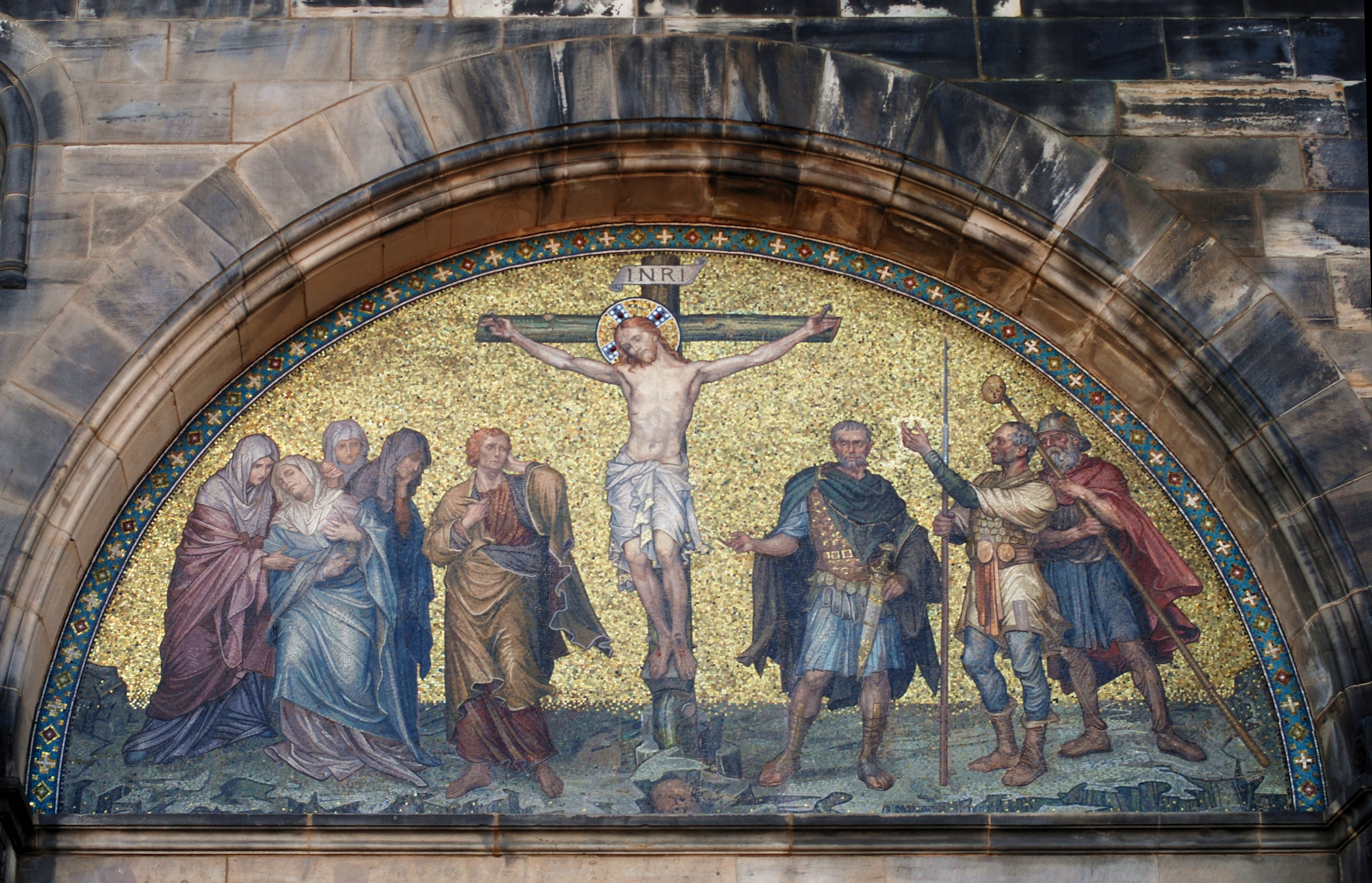
Crucifixion of Christ, on the façade of the cathedral, placed after 1888 instead of the sculpture on the left

Two crypts reveal the lower portions of the early Romanesque state of the cathedral. Consecrated in 1068, the western crypt is the oldest room on Bremen. Its altar is decorated by a Christ Pantocrator, the oldest sculpture of the cathedral. Nowadays this room is used for baptisms. Therefore, it contains the bronze baptismal font from 1229 that had been moved to all parts of the cathedral before.

The eastern crypt contains the bodies of almost ninety graves of bishops, archbishops, and other notables. Furthermore, it contains two sculptures from the western façade, the coronation of Saint Mary from the attic and the relic of the crucifixion from the southern central arch.

St Peter's has several fine examples of artistic epitaphs for individuals that have survived the many restorations of the cathedral. The three finest are for Chapter Senior Segebade II von der Hude (ca. 1500–1578; Provost of Himmelpforten Convent), Dr. Gerhard Brandis (1518), and Cathedral Provost Sigebade Clüver (1547). St Peter's was the original resting place of St Emma of Lesum, a wealthy benefactress of the church, who lived in outside the city in the early 11th century. When her tomb was opened, her body had crumbled to dust except for her right hand; the one that gave aid to the poor. The relic was moved to the church at Werden.

=== Museum ===
The cathedral museum was established in one of the side chapels in the 1970s cathedral restoration.

=== Bleikeller ===
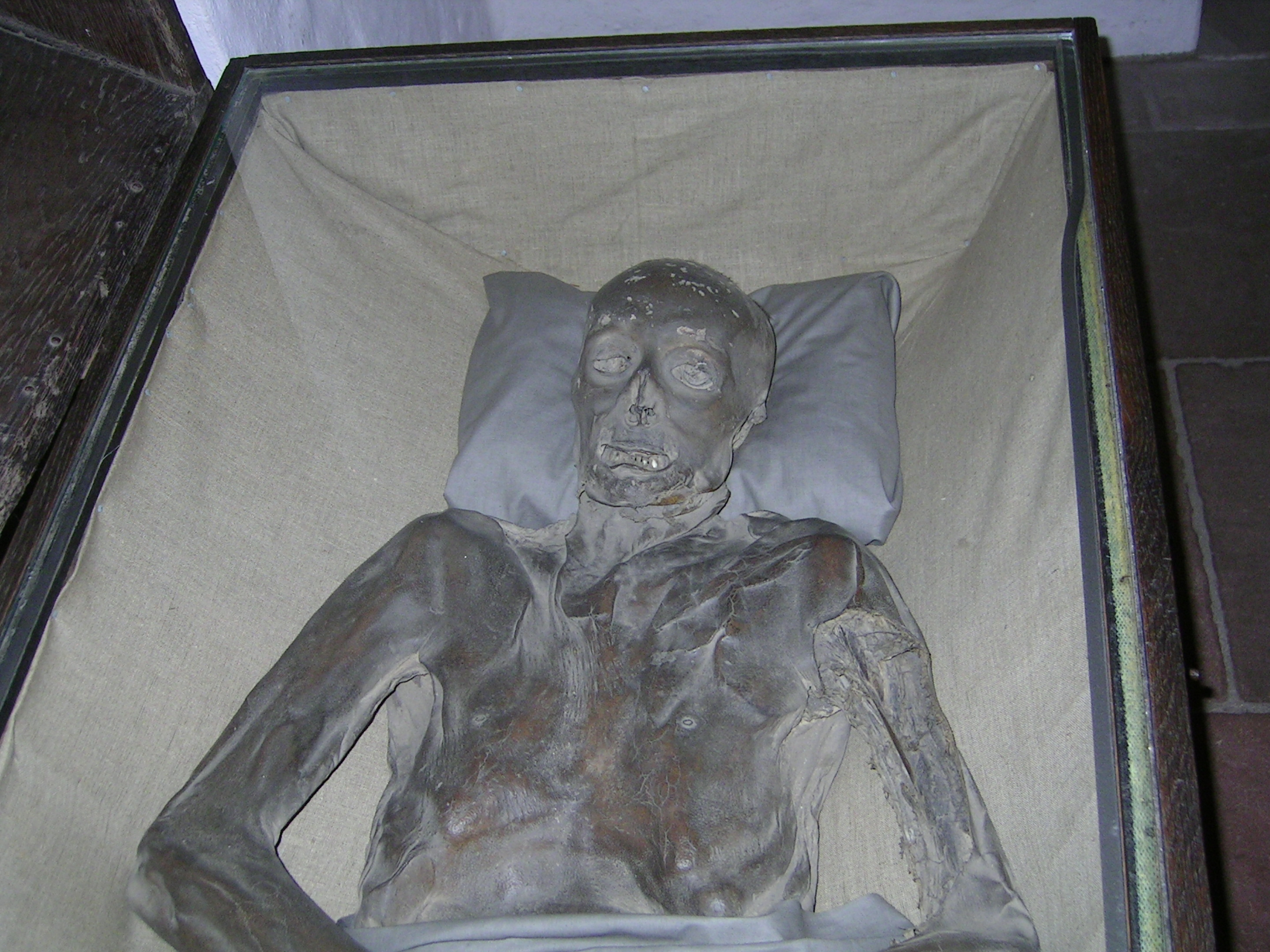
One of the mummies in the basement of the cathedral.

An unusual "Bleikeller" or lead basement is located beneath the nave, but has no more direct access from it. Originally, the roofs of the cathedral were covered with lead. As it had to be repaired very often, a huge amount of that metal was stored in a basement. Even before the Reformation, it was found that this cellar was an excellent place to preserve corpses amazingly well. Eight mummies in glass-topped coffins can be seen there. Their identity is displayed: two Swedish officers from the Thirty Years' War, an English countess, a murdered student, and a local pauper. That basement has become the cathedral's most visited attraction for more than 300 years.

== Towers ==
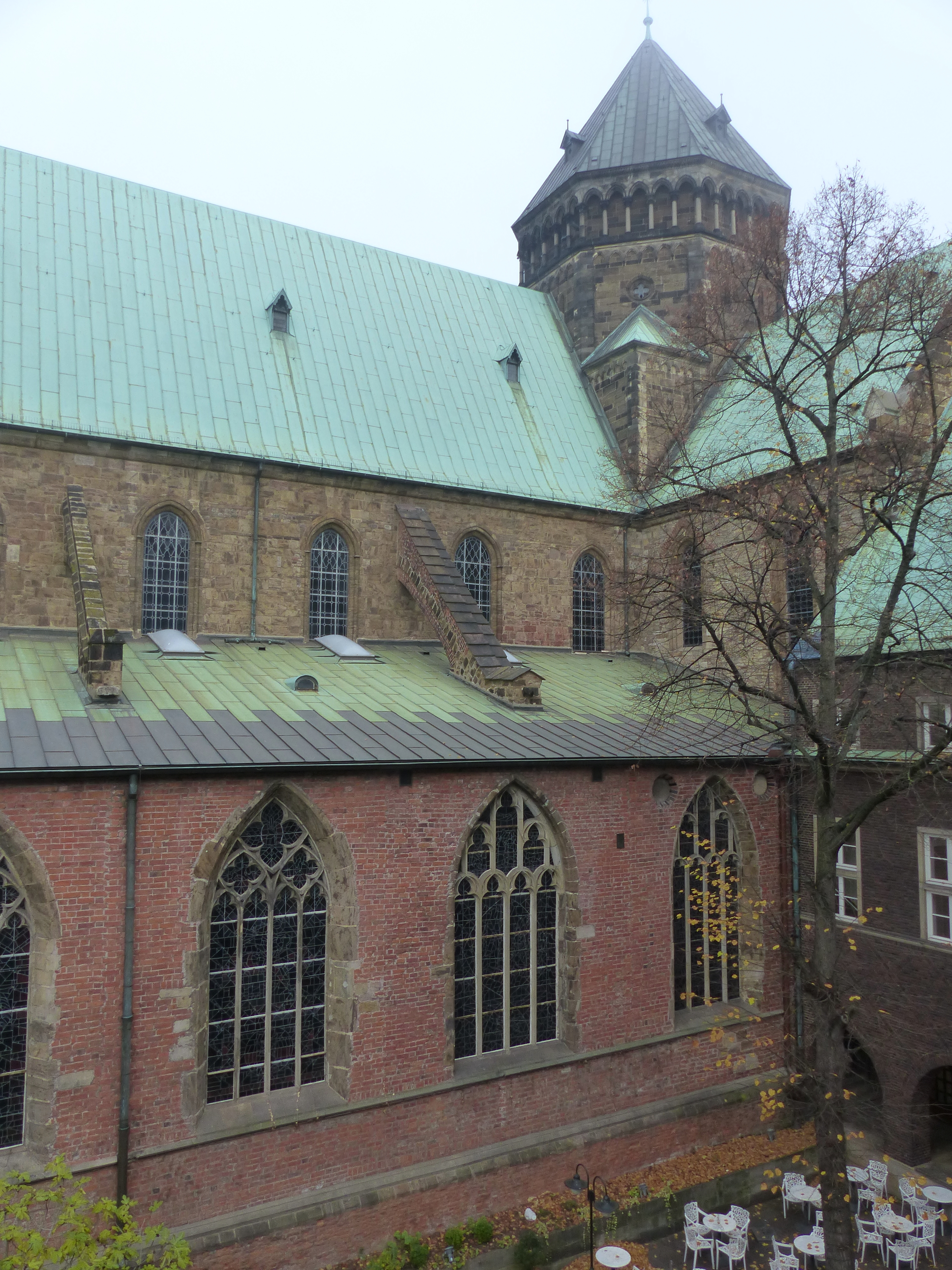
Crossing tower, nave and southern transept, seen across the bible garden (former cloister)

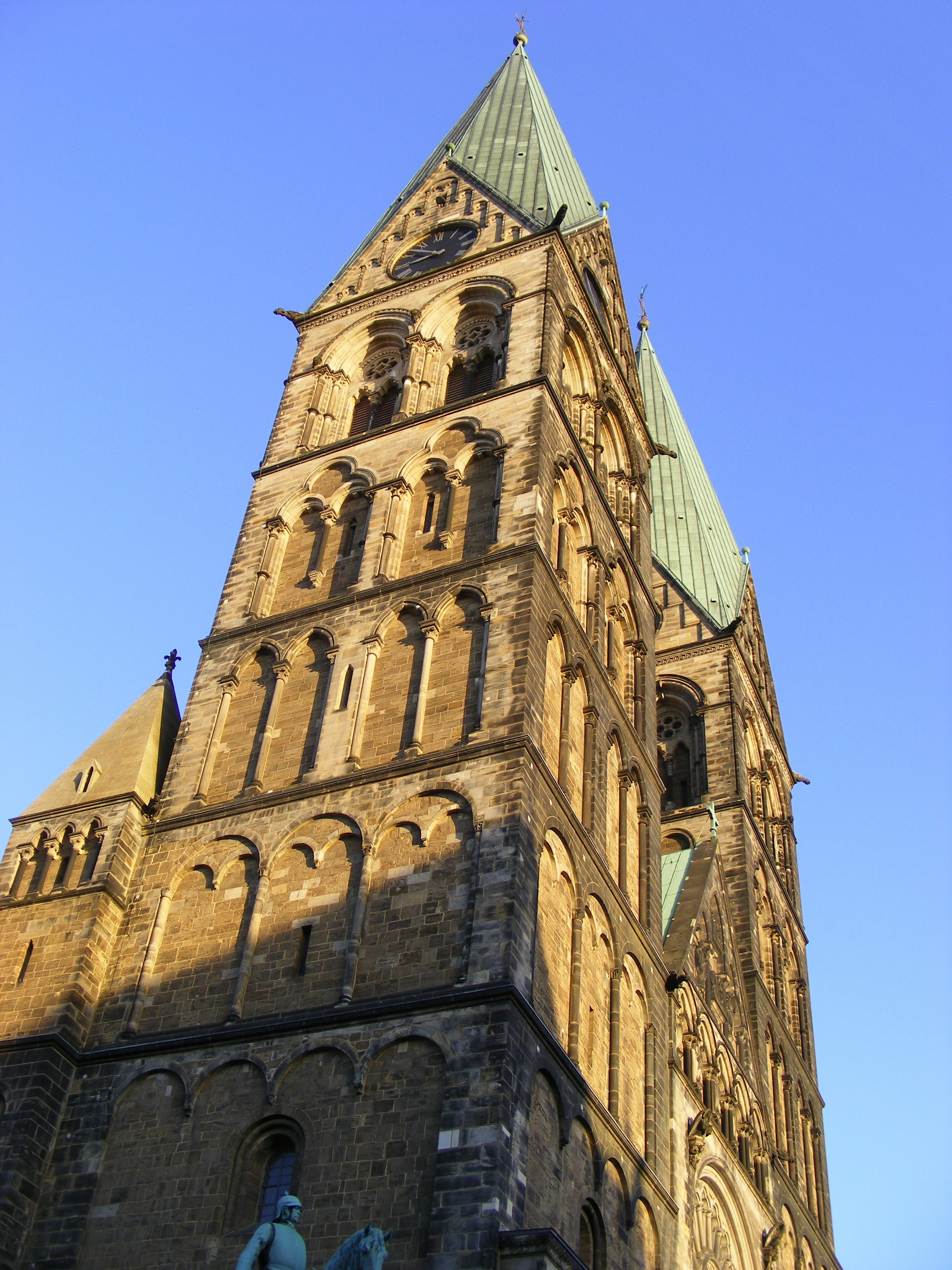
The lower storeys of the northern tower may be original

The cathedral has twin 89 meter towers (with weather-vanes 92.31 m) referred to as the north tower and the south tower. Like several major romanesque churches, Bremen Cathedral has a second choir in the west. The towers were constructed flanking this western choir, forming the west front of the church since 1215 and 1253. In 1346 the towers were strengthened and given pyramidal tops of uneven heights. When the towers were restored and raised in the 1890s they were given Rhenish "helmets," which still cap the towers today. It is possible to climb the south tower for a view of the city. The north tower has no public access. The crossing tower is a completely new addition of end 19th century. For several centuries, the outside design of the crossing had been modest.

== Bells ==
Both western towers together house the cathedral's four bells. The northern tower has three bells. The oldest surviving bell is the "Gloriosa" cast in 1433 by the famous bell maker Ghert Klinghe. The other bells were removed and melted down for the war effort in World War II. In 1951 two bells, "Hansa" and "Felicitas", were donated to the cathedral by former residents living abroad.

In 1962, a prominent Bremen family donated a fourth bell, the "Brema," which hangs in the southern tower. The Brema is the cathedral's bourdon bell and it weighs 7000 kg. In 2022, the cathedral added two new bells bringing a total to six and the Brema was recast. In Germany, the bells are always numbered from largest to smallest, Bell 1 is always the tenor or bourdon.

| Bell Number | Name (German) | Name (English) | Year of Cast | Mass (Kg) |
|---|---|---|---|---|
| 1 | Brema (Bourdon Bell) | | 1962 | 7000 |
| 2 | Gloriosa | | 1433 | 3700 |
| 3 | Hansa | | 1951 | 2100 |
| 4 | Felicitas | | 1951 | 1475 |
| 5 | Gerechtigkeit | Justice Bell | 2022 | 1050 |
| 6 | Schöpfung | Creation Bell | 2022 | 863 |

== Connected Themes ==
=== Adam of Bremen ===
11th century archbishop Adalbert also wanted to improve the reputation of the cathedral school and invited Magister Adam of Magdeburg Cathedral School to come to Bremen and eventually become its director. After 1072 Adam wrote The Deeds of the Bishops of the Hamburg Church, a history of the missionary efforts in northern Germany and Scandinavia in four volumes. Adam of Bremen, as he became known, used the earlier works of others available to him at what was left of the cathedral library to describe the events and people in the Christianization of north Germany, Frisia, and Scandinavia, for which Hamburg had authority to send missionaries. Adam of Bremen continued to revise and update his writing until his death in 1080. His fourth book was mainly written, it is believed, as a guide to the geography and customs of the peoples of Denmark, Norway, and Sweden for future missionaries in the conversion of the pagans of Denmark, Norway, and Sweden. In his work is found the first reference to Vinland.

=== Customs ===
There is a tradition with a connection to the cathedral. When a man reaches the age of 30 and still is not married, he must sweep the cathedral steps until a young woman gives him a kiss and then he is released from his duty. Women who reach their thirtieth birthday unmarried go to polish the cathedral doorknobs in the company of friends and family.

== Bibliography ==
- Hoffmann, Hans-Christoph (2007). Die Erhaltung des St.- Petri-Doms zu Bremen im 19. Jahrhundert (in German). Bremen: Hauschild. ISBN 978-3-89757-376-5.
