= Willehad =

8th-century Bishop of Bremen

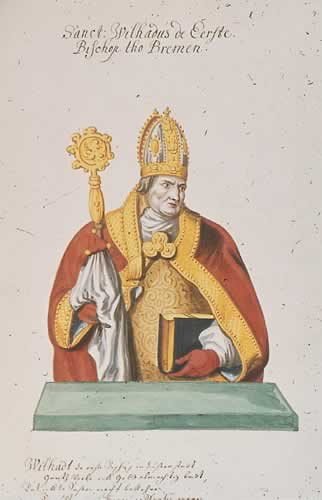
- Willehad of Bremen, from a woodcut of the Late Middle Ages

Missionary, Pilgrim and Bishop of Bremen
- Born: c. 735; Northumbria, England
- Died: 8 November 789; Blexen upon Weser, Germany
- Venerated in: Roman Catholic Church; Eastern Orthodox Church
- Major shrine: Echternach, Luxembourg
- Feast: 8 November, 13 July (ordination)
- Attributes: bishop overturning idols
- Patronage: Saxony

Willehad or Willihad (Latin: Willehadus/Willihadus); c. 745 AD – 8 November 789) was a Christian missionary and the Bishop of Bremen from 787 AD.

== Life ==
Willehad was born in Northumbria and probably received his education at York under Ecgbert. He was a friend of Alcuin. He was ordained, and about the year 766, he went to Frisia, preaching at Dokkum and in Overijssel, to continue the missionary work of Boniface who had been martyred by the Frisians in 754. At an assembly in Paderborn in 777, Saxony was divided into missionary zones. The zone between the Weser and the Elbe, called Wigmodia, was given to Willehad.

From 780 Willehad preached in the region of the lower Weser River on commission from Charlemagne. He barely escaped with his life when the Frisians wanted to kill him and he returned to the area around Utrecht. Once again he and his fellow missionaries barely escaped with their lives when the local pagans wanted to kill them for destroying some temples. Finally, in 780, Charlemagne sent him to evangelize the Saxons. He preached to them for two years but, in 782, the Saxons under Widukind, rebelled against Charlemagne and Willehad was forced to flee to Frisia. A number of his assistants and friends were killed. He took the opportunity to travel to Rome where he reported to Pope Adrian I on his work.

Upon his return from Rome, Willehad retired for a time to the monastery of Echternach, in present-day Luxembourg. He spent two years there working in the scriptorium, and reassembling his missionary team.

After Charlemagne's conquest of the Saxons, Willehad preached in the region around the lower Elbe and the lower Weser. In 787 Willehad was consecrated bishop, and that part of Saxony and Friesland near the mouth of the Weser was assigned to him for his diocese. He chose as his see the city of Bremen, which is mentioned for the first time in documents of 782, and built a cathedral there. Praised for its beauty by Anschar, it was dedicated in 789. He also built a small church at Blexen.

Willehad died in Blexen upon Weser, today a part of Nordenham. He is buried in the city's cathedral, which he consecrated shortly before his death on 8 November 789. Anschar compiled a life of Willehad, and the preface which he wrote was considered a masterpiece for that age. In 860, a sick girl from Wege (Weyhe) traveled to his grave. There, she was reportedly cured by a miracle. This was the first time the small village was mentioned in any historical documents.

== See also ==
- Saint Willehad, patron saint archive

== Sources ==
- McKitterick, Rosamond (1983). The Frankish Kingdoms under the Carolingians, 751–987. London: Longman.

Willehad Born: 745 in Northumbria Died: 8 November 789 in Blexen upon Weser
Catholic Church titles
New diocese	Bishop of Bremen; 787–789	Vacant Title next held by Willerich; 805–838
