= Willerich =

German Catholic bishop

Willerich (*unknown – 4 May? 838*) was the second bishop of Bremen in Germany; or, according to some, the first, his predecessor Willehad being just a missionary in the area, and the diocese set up after his death. He was consecrated in 804 or 805.

He took part in an evangelizing mission to Denmark in 823, with Ebbo of Rheims and Halitgar, bishop of Cambrai. It had only a very limited success, the conversion of the north would take place later with Ansgar.

== Notes ==
Willerich Born: unknown Died: 4 May? 838
Catholic Church titles
Vacant Title last held by Willehad; 787-789	Bishop of Bremen; 805–838	Succeeded by Leuderich
