= Assault on Bützfleth redoubt =

Fought between Sweden and Denmark in 1657

- Part of the Dano-Swedish War (1657–1658)
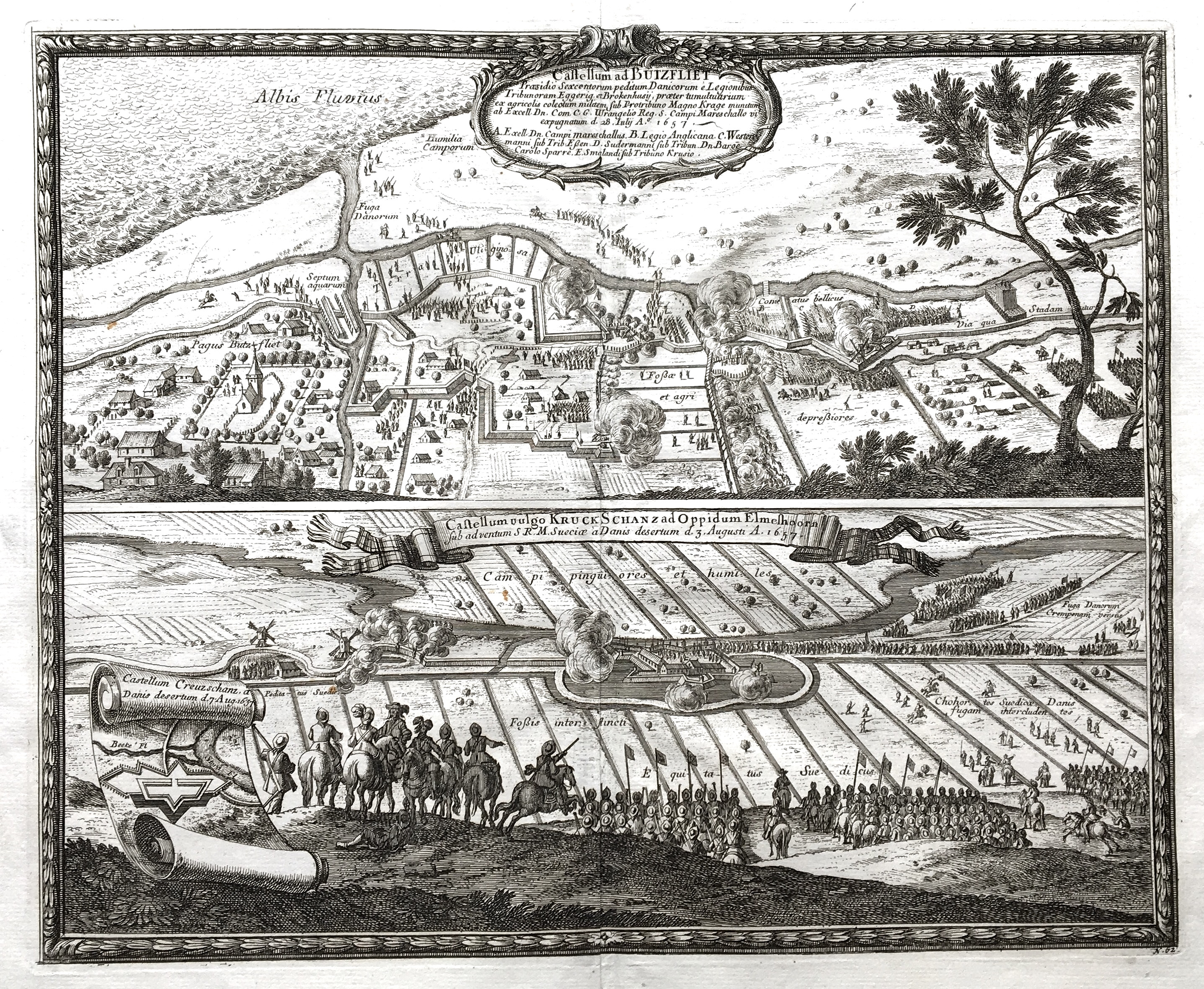
- Upper copper engraving from 1696 by Samuel Pufendorf depicts the Swedish assault on Bützfleth
Date	28 July 1657
Location	Bützfleth, Bremen-Verden 53°40′N 9°29′E
Result	Swedish victory
Territorial changes	Bützfleth recaptured by Swedish forces

Belligerents
(yes) Swedish Empire	Denmark–Norway

Commanders and leaders
(yes) Carl Gustaf Wrangel	Mogens Krag (surrendered)

Units involved
Unknown	Bützfleth garrison

Strength
1,800 men	c. 450–500 men

Casualties and losses
"Nine cart-loads" (Danish claim); 6 killed and 6 wounded (Swedish claim)	150–300 killed and wounded 200–300 surrendered

The assault on Bützfleth redoubt occurred on 28 July 1657 during the Dano-Swedish War of 1657–1658, when a Swedish force of 1,800 men under the command of Carl Gustaf Wrangel successfully assaulted the Danish-held redoubt at Bützfleth, garrisoned by 450–500 men commanded by Mogens Krag.

After having bombarded Danish defenses with artillery, Swedish troops advanced along a dam, eventually forcing the Danes to surrender after inflicting 150–300 killed and wounded. Mogens Krag, along with the remaining Danish troops, fell into Swedish captivity and in August Wrangel assaulted Lehe sconce as well.

== Background ==
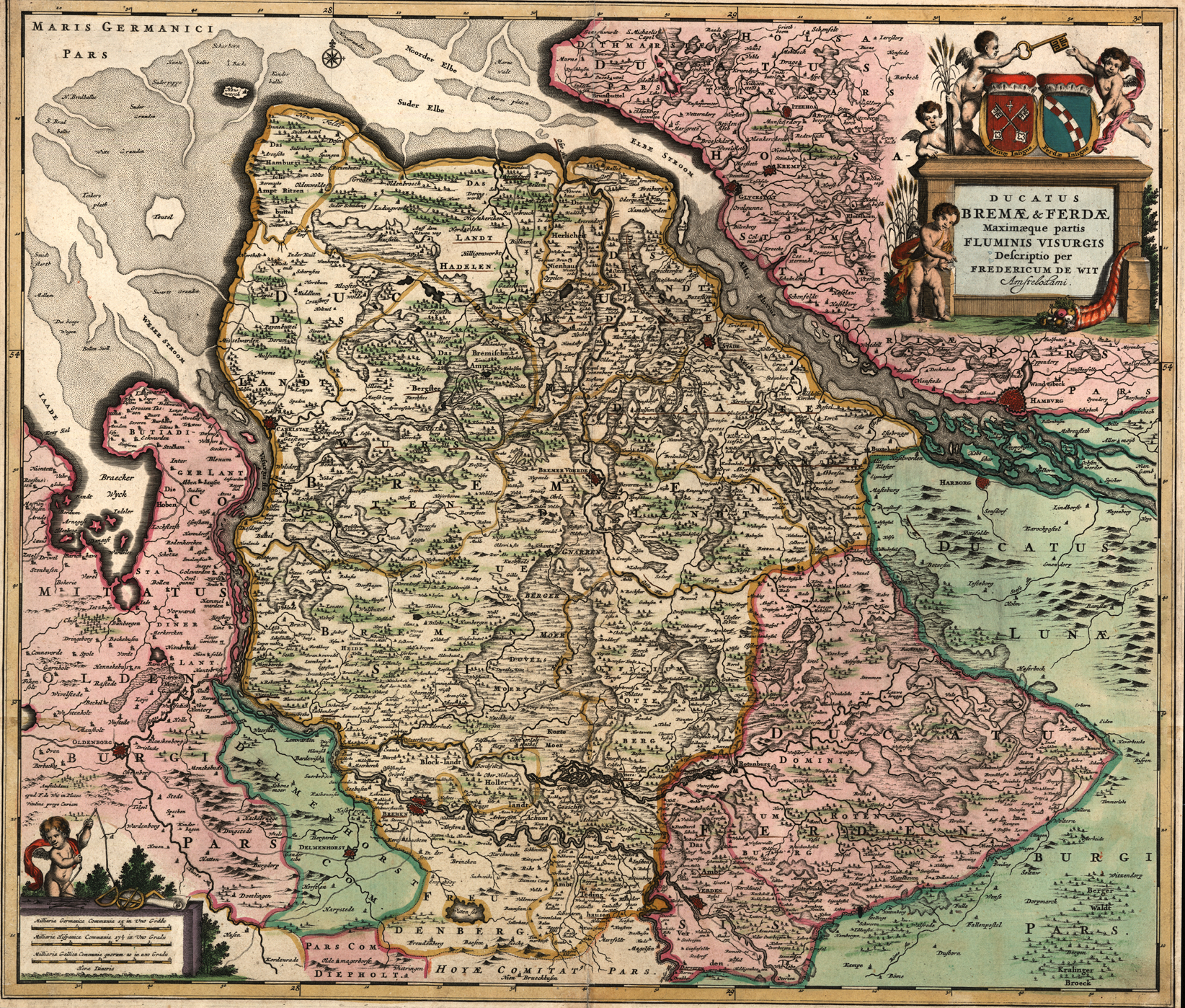
Map of Bremen-Verden from 1655 by Frederik de Wit

At the beginning of the Danish invasion of Bremen-Verden in 1657, Danish Colonel Eiler Holck captured the bastions at Lehe, some days before the capitulation of Bremervörde to Anders Bille. However, on 24 July, reports of King Charles X Gustav's approach from Pomerania reached the Danes, causing panic among Frederick III and other commanders. By 2 August, a Danish reconnaissance mission to Hamburg led by Hinrich Ahlefeldt was routed at Fuhlsbüttel by the advance guard of Charles' army. On 3 August, the Swedish army reached the Elbe, preventing the Danish flottila from stopping a crossing. Consequently, the Danish cavalry, some 4,000 men, retreated from Holstein. After a few days' rest in Ottensen, Carl Gustaf Wrangel was dispatched to Bremen-Verden with 1,800 men to clear out any remaining Danish troops.

== Assault ==
While Charles X Gustav personally recaptured Schwinge from the Danes, Wrangel marched against the unfinished Bützfleth redoubt, garrisoned by around 450–500 infantry under the command of Lieutenant Colonel Mogens Krag. The Danish garrison was not expecting a Swedish attack and was therefore unprepared. After bombarding the Danish defenses with artillery, the redoubt was assaulted on July 28. The Swedes had to advance along a narrow dam to access the redoubt, but the Danes soon faltered and surrendered after suffering 150 killed and wounded. According to other sources, 200 Danes were captured, including Krag, while the rest were killed.

Accounts of Swedish losses vary. According to Danish sources, Swedish losses were heavy, described as 'nine cart-loads' of dead, whereas Wrangel reported six killed and six wounded.

== Aftermath ==
After capturing Bützfleth redoubt, Wrangel marched against the bastion at Belem, firing on Danish vessels evacuating across the Elbe. Any remaining cavalry and infantry fled to Lehe, with the exception of Valdemar Daae's company, which dissolved soon after. The remaining Danish units retreated to Lehe or Bremervörde. The former was taken by Swedish forces in August.

== See also ==
- Assault on Lehe sconce – Fought between Sweden and Denmark in 1657
- Siege of Fredriksodde – 1657 Dano-Swedish War siege
- Assault on Eda Sconce – Assault on a Swedish sconce in 1658
