= Assault on Lehe sconce =

Fought between Sweden and Denmark in 1657

- Part of the Dano-Swedish War (1657–1658)
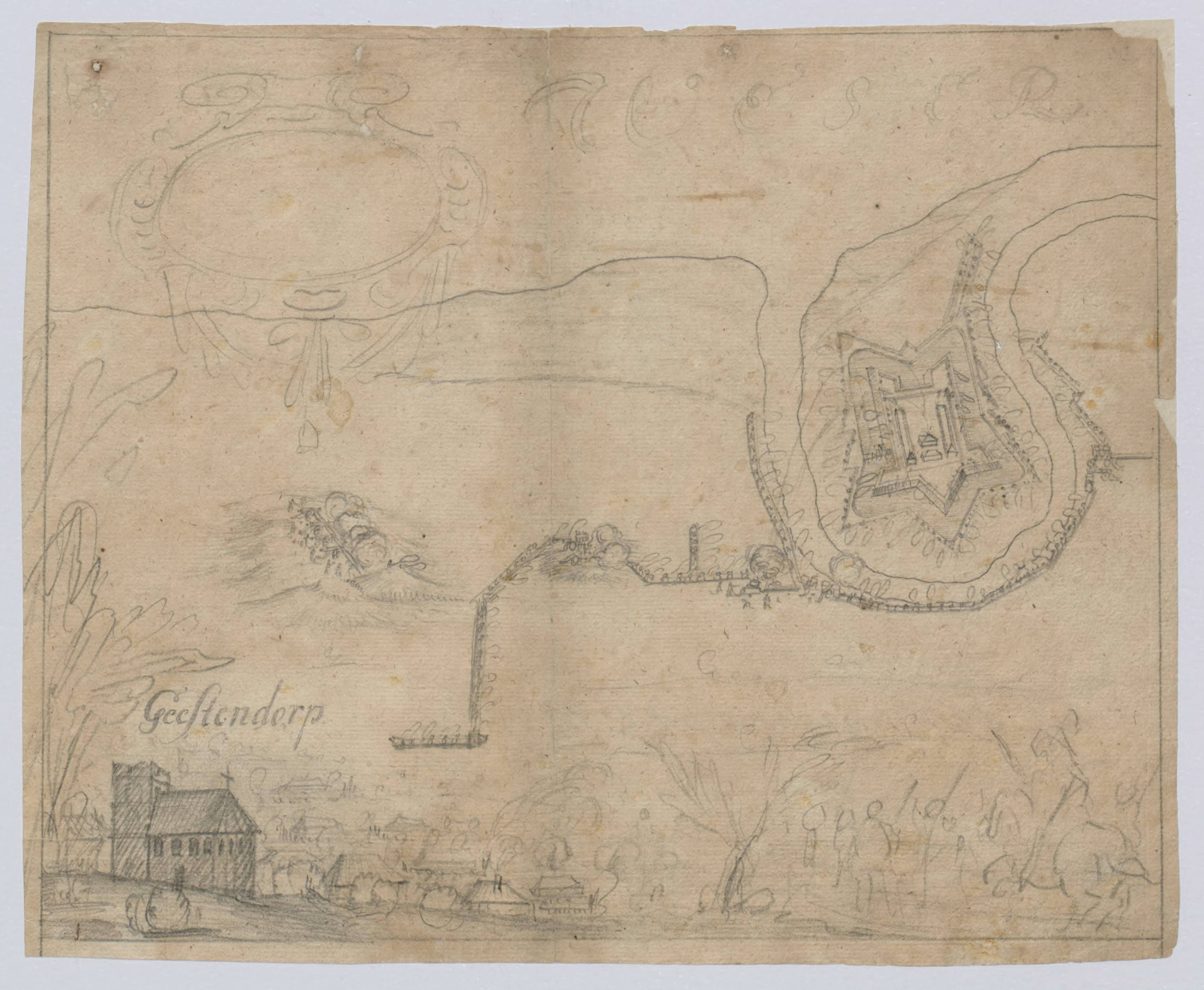
- Contemporary depiction of the assault by Erik Dahlbergh
Date	2–6 August 1657
Location	Lehe sconce, Bremen-Verden 53°34′22.68″N 08°35′38.05″E
Result	Swedish victory
Territorial changes	Lehe sconce capitulates to Swedish forces

Belligerents
(yes) Swedish Empire	Denmark–Norway

Commanders and leaders
(yes) Carl Gustaf Wrangel	Iver Olufsen †; Holle (surrendered)

Units involved
Unknown	Lehe garrison

Strength
1,800 men At least 11 guns	c. 400–500 men

Casualties and losses
2 killed 2 wounded	Several killed Remaining troops surrendered

The assault on Lehe sconce occurred from 2–6 August 1657 during the Dano-Swedish War of 1657–1658. A Swedish force of 1,800 men under the command of Swedish commander Carl Gustaf Wrangel successfully attacked the sconce which was defended by Iver Olufsen and Major Holle with 400–500 men. After reaching the sconce on 2 August, skirmishing between both sides broke out until Swedish artillery arrived on 4 August, after which both sides began bombarding each other. Despite the Swedish numerical superiority, Olufsen refused to surrender and was killed in combat, after which Major Holle capitulated to the Swedes.

== Background ==
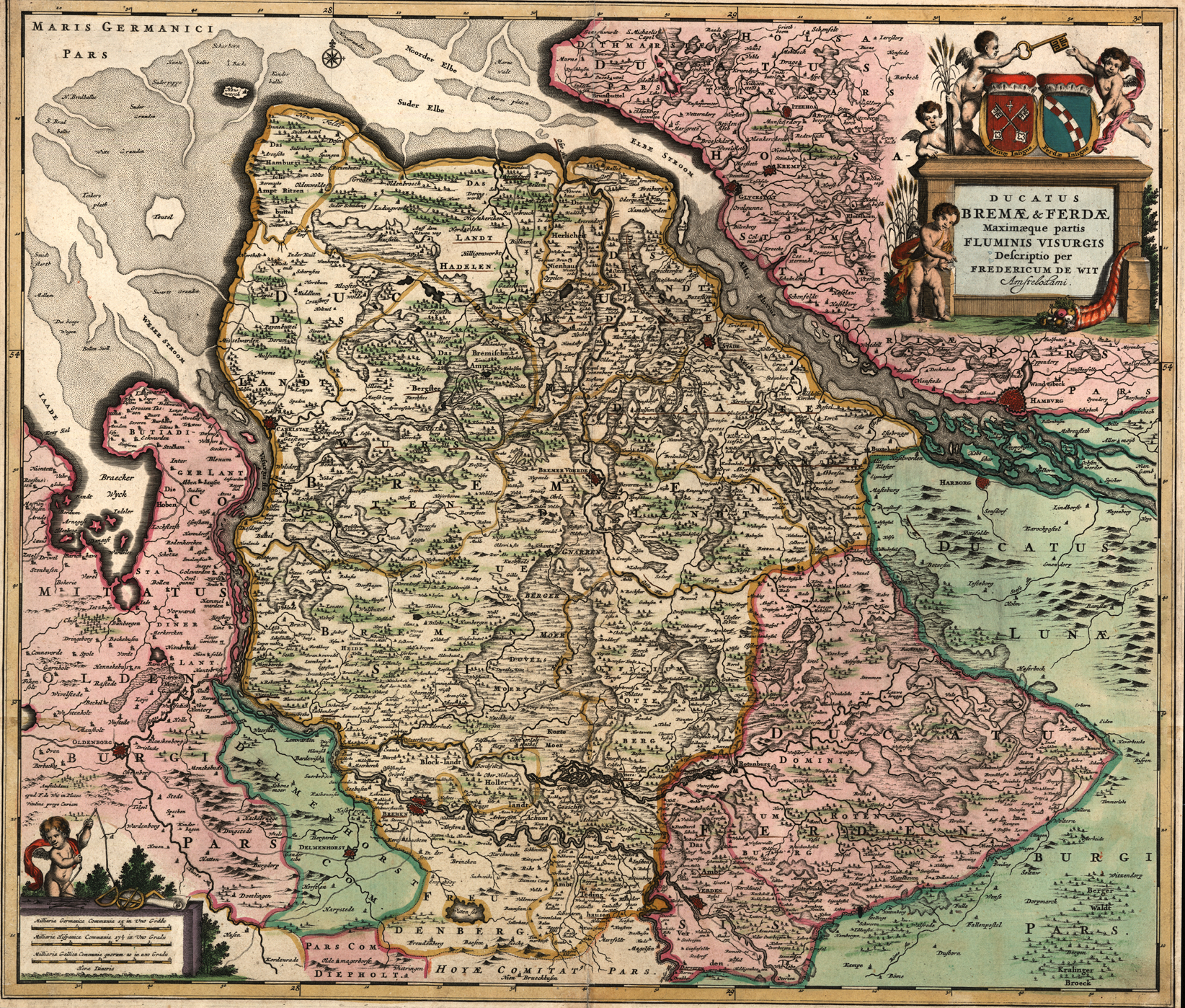
Map of Bremen-Verden from 1655 by Frederik de Wit

At the beginning of the Danish invasion of Bremen-Verden in 1657, Danish Colonel Eiler Holck captured the bastions at Lehe, some days before the capitulation of Bremervörde to Anders Bille. However, on 24 July, reports of King Charles X Gustav's approach from Pomerania reached the Danes, causing panic among Frederick III and other commanders. By 2 August, a Danish reconnaissance mission to Hamburg led by Hinrich Ahlefeldt was routed at Fuhlsbüttel by the advance guard of Charles' army. On 3 August, the Swedish army reached the Elbe, preventing the Danish flotilla from stopping a crossing. Consequently, the Danish cavalry, some 4,000 men, retreated from Holstein.

After a few days' rest in Ottensen, Carl Gustaf Wrangel was dispatched to Bremen-Verden with 1,800 men to clear out any remaining Danish troops. He recaptured Bützfleth redoubt from Colonel Mogens Krag on 28 July. Wrangel then marched against the bastion at Belem, firing on Danish vessels evacuating across the Elbe. Any remaining cavalry and infantry fled to Lehe, with the exception of Valdemar Daae's company, which dissolved soon after. The remaining Danish units retreated to Lehe or Bremervörde.

== Assault ==
In lieu of pursuing the Danes, Wrangel moved against Lehe sconce, arriving on the Weser opposite the sconce on 2 August. The sconce was commanded by Iver Olufsen, along with Major Holle, who led a company from Lübbe's Black Regiment. Lehe sconce had also been reinforced by 232 men from other Danish companies. In total, the sconce had some 400 men, including healthy, sick, and wounded troops. Other sources claim that the sconce had a garrison of 500 men.

Following days of skirmishing, Swedish artillery, in the form of nine heavy guns, several light guns, and two mortars, arrived on 4 August. Both sides subsequently began bombarding each other. The Swedes began advancing with two trenches on opposite sides. Two of the Swedish mortars caused extensive damage, as the Danes lacked cover from their bombardment. Despite this, Olufsen refused to surrender and the Danes continued defending themselves until 6 August when Olufsen was killed, and Major Holle surrendered after negotiations. Wrangel's joy over the victory was "exceedingly great" and he was unable to find words strong enough to express it.

== Aftermath ==
Swedish casualties amounted to around 2 killed and 2 wounded, while several Danes had been killed, which has been described as heavy. The remaining Danish troops fell into Swedish captivity. Wrangel also garrisoned the sconce with 100 men. Thus, Wrangel had recaptured all of Bremen-Verden except for Bremervörde, which he blockaded due to its powerful fortifications.

== See also ==
- Siege of Fredriksodde – 1657 Dano-Swedish War siege
- Assault on Eda Sconce – Assault on a Swedish sconce in 1658
- Assault on Bützfleth redoubt – Fought between Sweden and Denmark in 1657
