= Jens Grand =

Danish archbishop (1260–1327)

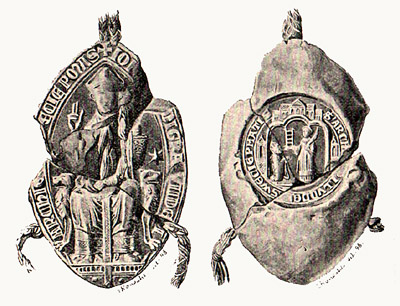
Seal of Jens Grand

Jens Grand, the Firebug (Low German: Fürsate, Swedish: Fursat; about 1260 – 29 May 1327 in Avignon) was a Danish archbishop of Lund (1289–1302), titular Archbishop of Riga and Terra Mariana (1304–1310), and Prince-Archbishop of Bremen (as John I 1310–1327), known as the central figure of the second ecclesiastical struggle in Denmark in the late 13th century. He was an outstanding jurist of canon law.

Grand was the son of Torbern Hvide, an officer at the Danish royal court, and of Cæcilie Skjalmsdatter, a sister of Peder Bang, Bishop of Roskilde. Bang and Cæcilie were also members of the Hvide clan, which came into conflict with the Danish throne through Stig Andersen Hvide's regicide of King Eric V Klipping in 1286. Grand studied at the University of Paris and received a degree as a doctor of canon law. About 1280 he gained a prebend as canon of the Roskilde Cathedral and in 1283 he advanced to the post of cathedral provost. Possibly Grand was an accomplice of the regicide. Maybe his donation of twelve prebendaries to the Roskilde Cathedral, which Pope Nicholas IV confirmed in 1288, is to be understood as an atonement for that sin. On 27 July, the same year, Ingvar Bishop of Roskilde granted Grand the castle of Selsø Slot (a part of today's Skibby).

== Grand as Archbishop of Lund ==
Grand appeared as a political figure when in 1289 the cathedral chapter of Lund elected him as archbishop. This position included the Scandinavian primacy. Even though the Danish King Eric VI Menved sharply protested at the Holy See, Nicholas IV confirmed Grand's election in 1290. From the start Grand firmly opposed the royal power, openly sympathising with the exiled magnates and refusing any support of the royal family. Like Lund's former Archbishop Jacob Erlandsen, whose sister was Grand's maternal grandmother, he seems to have been the supporter of an independent church without any obligations towards the State or the king. These views, which seem to have been expressed in a both daring and provoking way, made him appear to the young Eric Menved as a pure traitor - especially at a time of danger.

In 1291 Grand approved himself as a jurist and decreed the new Constitutio cum Ecclesia Daciana, asserting canon law in Denmark at the expense of royal privileges. This affront escalated in a dispute between Eric Menved and Grand on the investiture of Lund's dean, Thorkil, and its provost, Jakob Lange, with additional prebends. In the following year Grand initiated to set up a necrologium of the Archdiocese, an inventory recording all the dead to be clerically commemorated by Offices of the Dead and the pertaining prebends and foundations donated to account for these ceremonies. In the course of the dispute - ostensibly on the prebends Grand invested disregarding the royal say in investiture - Grand excommunicated Eric Menved.

In 1294, Eric Menved in return ordered Grand's and Lange's arrestment. Grand was imprisoned in Søborg Castle in Northern Zealand under both humiliating and unhealthy conditions. After some months in terrible conditions, Eric Menved sent a messenger to Grand to see if he would swear allegiance again and promise to seek no revenge for his captivity. He replied: "Rather than bend to his will, I would rather that the king sliced me apart joint by joint than submit to his commands." Pope Celestine V protested Grand's imprisonment, but in vain. Lange was held in captivity in Kalundborg castle. At the beginning of 1295 Lange managed to escape and fled to Rome pleading the new Pope Boniface VIII for help.

On 14 December 1295, Grand too, succeeded in escaping with the help of a cook and fled to his castle Hammershus on Bornholm, whereafter he sought help from Boniface VIII. While Grand was in Rome, Eric Menved took his revenge by ravaging the estates of Grand and his supporters. Grand preferred a charge on Eric Menved at the curia, demanding a huge compensation for his arrest, the ravage of his estates, together with general royal concessions. In return Eric Menved accused him of disloyal behaviour and treason.

In 1297 the curial verdict obliged Eric Menved to compensate Grand with a silver weight of 40,000 marks of Lund, an enormous amount at that time. When Eric Menved refused to provide that amount of silver, Boniface issued an interdict on Denmark and a ban on Eric Menved, but without much effect. Both the Danish bishops and much of the people seem to have preferred a peaceful solution. The papal nuncio sent out to execute the verdict, Isarnus Tacconi (also Isarno Morlane) from Fontiès-d'Aude, archpriest of Carcassonne, came off empty-handed. In 1301 Tacconi became Prince-Archbishop of Riga.

The Grand affair lasted from 1297 to 1302 and was a foreign political strain on the Danish government. Eric Menved's firm attitude, together with a half-hearted support from the church, weakened Grand's case. After a royal rapprochement to Pope Boniface VIII - negotiated by Martin (Morten Mogensen) of Dacia, canon of the Ribe Cathedral in the Ribe diocese, later Rector of the University of Paris -, the affair ended in 1302 with a reduced compensation of silver weighing 10,000 marks. In the end Eric Menved only provided 4,000 marks in 1304, so that then Pope Benedict XI, Boniface' successor, lifted the ban on him. As part of the deal, Grand was removed from the rich see of Lund. Grand's later career was marked by new struggles.

== Grand as Prince-Archbishop designate of Riga ==
On 3 January 1303 Boniface VIII - with effect only in 1304 - replaced Grand as Archbishop of Lund by Isarnus Tacconi, since 1301 prince-archbishop in Riga. Still in 1303 Pope Benedict XI, Boniface' successor, provided Grand with the thus vacant Prince-Archbishopric of Riga and Terra Mariana. But Grand rejected Riga's see as too poor. Instead Grand then moved to Paris, lucratively investing 2,400 livres parisis from his Danish compensation as a credit to the St Denis Abbey on the grounds that the Abbey would pay him later an annual rent of 400 livres.

== Grand as Prince-Archbishop of Bremen ==
Meanwhile, Benedict XI was succeeded by Pope Clement V, who was personally acquainted with Grand. In 1310 Clement V, then residing in Poitiers, took his chance to circumvent the say of the Bremian cathedral chapter and claimed according to the new canonical ius devolutionis the right to appoint himself Grand as new Prince-Archbishop of Bremen. Grand was the first Archbishop of Bremen, who was not elected by the Chapter, thus he had no local supporters.

On 2 June the same year, Grand was invested with the pallium in Avignon. Three weeks later Grand got the invoice, the papal treasurer demanded to pay the servitia minuta and the so-called servitium commune, the latter making up a third of the annual revenues of the See. Grand paid a servitium commune of 600 Guilders (Florins), thus Bremen's annual revenues only amounted to a 1,800 Guilders, while Lund yielded its archbishop 12,000 Guilders, and Riga, which he had doomed too poor, still brought 2,400 Guilders p.a. Maybe Grand accepted the Prince-Archbishopric of Bremen, because by his sister Ingefred Torbe(r)nsdatter (marr. with Jon Jonsen Litle) he was related to the Counts of Schauenburg and Holstein, whose county belonged to the diocesan territory of Bremen.

=== Situation in the Prince-Archbishopric at Grand's Arrival ===
On 17 September 1310 Bernhard, Count of Wölpe, the dean of Bremen's cathedral and Prince-Archbishop elect of 1307 died, after years of bowing and scraping at the curia, without ever gaining his papal confirmation. All of Northern Germany was plagued already with a famine lasting about 15 years after a series of misharvests. In addition to that law and order in the Prince-Archbishopric of Bremen had fallen into decay during the three years of sede vacante. The council of the city of Bremen had usurped the jurisdiction from the prince-archiepiscopal bailiff in town. Burghers bought feudal estates in the proximity of the city, superseding knight families. This development led to the establishment of city-own countryside territory, where the city council would influence the appointment of judges within the Gohe (dike and drainage system venues).

Different magnates and clerical or secular entities (such as convents, cities) had alienated the prince-archiepiscopal revenues. Knights from families of nobility or ministerialis had usurped powerful positions in the Prince-Archbishopric. While Martin von der Hude terrorised the area between the rivers Weser and Oste, Heinrich von Borch, another robber baron, covered the area eastwards thereof until the river Elbe. In 1309 the city of Bremen, John III of Oldenburg-Delmenhorst and a number of knights confederated themselves to defeat Martin von der Hude.

Borch held the central prince-archiepiscopal Vörde Castle and the pertaining bailiwick. He abused the castle as starting point for his brigandages, earning him the epithet Isern Hinnerk (Iron Henry). In the same time he built his own castle Dannensee near Beckdorf and close to the Prince-Archbishopric's border with the Principality of Brunswick and Lüneburg-Celle. Local esquires, the city of Bremen, and many knights of the ministerialis, among them the bailiffs of Stade and of the Saxe-Lauenburgian exclave of the Land of Hadeln, formed a federation, sealed in April 1310, combining their interests to subject the brigandage with the separatist ambition of Stade's bailiff, the Count of Brobergen or Stade, being a vassal of the Prince-Archbishop, to constitute the County of Stade as a territory of imperial immediacy directly under the Emperor of the Holy Roman Empire. 200 armed men of the federation beleaguered the castle in Vörde and demanded Isern Hinnerk to leave.

== Grand Re-establishing the Order in the Prince-Archbishopric ==
In October 1310 Grand arrived in the monastery in Hude, which belonged in religious respect to his new diocese, but as to the secular reign it was part of the County of Oldenburg. From there monks and representatives of the city of Bremen accompanied him into the Prince-Archbishopric of Bremen. The federation welcomed him warmly and accepted Grand as Prince-Archbishop. The federation and Grand made Isern Hinnerk abandon the castle in Vörde, with Isern Hinnerk entrenching in his own castle near Beckdorf.

Still in 1310 Grand demanded from all the clergymen within his diocese and the pertaining suffragan dioceses of Lübeck, Ratzeburg, and Schwerin the donum charitativum (also called subsidium caritativum) amounting to 10% of all cleric revenues, such as prebends and the like, but he spared the Bremian capitulars to win their support. At the beginning of their episcopate bishops used to levy the donum as a tax from their subordinate clergy including the suffragan bishops to recover the expenses necessary to buy a papal confirmation or appointment to a See. In a wide interpretation of this use, Grand demanded the city of Stade to pay a tithe as subsidium caritativum. The Bremian Subchapter at Hamburg Concathedral protested at the curia for not being spared like Bremen's Chapter and on behalf of Stade.

Meanwhile, Isern Hinnerk expanded his brigandages, to rob the means to accomplish his castle. Grand excommunicated him, but Isern Hinnerk even spread his robberies to neighboured Brunswick and Lunenburg-Celle and the Prince-Bishopric of Verden. This brought about a coalition of Grand with Duke Otto II the Strict of Brunswick and Lunenburg-Celle and Prince-Bishop Frederick I inflicting a feud on Isern Hinnerk, which would put an end to his robberies. They destroyed his castle Dannensee, beleaguered the castle in Horneburg, where he found refuge with relatives. After a second flight Hinnerk was enjailed in Vörde in 1311. The population appreciated Grand's success, because after years of insecurity he re-established order in the Prince-Archbishopric.

== Grand's Deteriorating Relations to his Subjects and Neighboured Princes ==
The Bremian clergy south of the river Elbe yielded and paid the donum, but north of the Elbe the old rivalry with the subchapter in Hamburg resurged, demanding the same treatment as the Bremian Chapter. Grand convened for a provincial synod, but the representatives of the suffragan dioceses and Hamburg's Subchapter refused to come. Grand then decided, to ignore the complaints of the absent clergymen. To make the things worse, Grand appointed his own candidates with prebends of the Lübeck Cathedral. He disentangled the new Archdeaconry of the Land of Wursten from the existing Archdeaconry of the Land of Hadeln, so that he could provide the canon Johannes Lütke as Wursten's Archdeacon with his own prebend. On 23 November 1311 Pope Clement XII appointed Grand as arbiter in the dispute between the Prince-Archbishopric of Riga under Prince-Archbishop Frederick and Teutonic Prussia under Grand Master Karl von Trier. At the beginning of the next year he participated in the Council of Vienne. There he was confronted with proceedings, instituted by Lübeck's Chapter on his unconsented appointments.

When in 1312 Grand returned his clerical opponents had united. His stubbornness and invidiousness earned him the Low German nickname Fürsate (Engl. literally: fire-seed(er), the Firebug). The provost of Hamburg's Subchapter refused to pay, declaring the donum to be illegal, the suffragan prince-bishops Burchard of Lübeck, Marquard of Ratzeburg, and Godfrey I of Schwerin assented to that view. In 1313 Clement V adjudicated Grand the subsidium caritativum from Hamburg's Subchapter, but it still refused to pay. Grand in return inflicted excommunications on his opponents. The clergy again ignored the excommunications.

Meanwhile, Grand also fell out with the Bremian Chapter, the city of Bremen, the Bremian nobility and ministerialis, the neighboured rulers over (1) the high taxes to sanify the ruinous state budget, (2) the appointment of the former robber baron Martin von der Hude as officialis of the Prince-Archbishopric and bailiff of the castle in Langwedel (Count Otto II of Hoya and Count John III of Oldenburg-Delmenhorst protested, because Hude had earlier also ravaged their territories with his brigandages.), (3) a charge, preferred by the Bremian Chapter, that Grand ordered the arrest of the priest Ubbo, whom - once in jail - Grand allegedly put to death. The city of Bremen assented to the Chapter's view.

His opponents set the settlement close to his castle in Vörde on fire and maltreated one of his clerics. In early 1314 Grand fled under acute threat of arrestment to the castle in Langwedel, held by his vassal Martin von der Hude, who was known for exploiting and maltreating the population in his bailiwick. The opposition also demanded to rehabilitate Isern Hinnerk.

On 21 July 1314 Prince-Bishop Burchard, Prince-Bishop Marquard, Hamburg's Subchapter, the Chapters of the Prince-Bischoprics of Lübeck, Ratzeburg, and Schwerin concluded an alliance against Grand's immoderate tax collections. Soon after Prince-Bishop Godfrey joined the alliance. The alliance started a series of lawsuits against Grand at the curia, while Grand banned the allies with anathemata. Grand did not wait for the curia to react, but himself chose Prince-Bishop Nicolaus Ketelhodt of Verden and his treasurer as judges. On 3 January 1315 they admitted the litigants to be correct and annulled Grand's anathemata. Grand ignored the judgement. This even brought together the rivalling Chapters of Bremen and Hamburg, which agreed upon a common way of proceeding in February 1315. Grand, out of funds, now incurred debts with Count John III of Oldenburg-Delmenhorst, while Grand's debtors increasingly refused to pay, playing for time, hoping Grand to be deposed soon.

On 19 August 1314 Count Otto II of Hoya, Count John III of Oldenburg-Delmenhorst, and the Esquire of Diepholz confederated themselves against Grand. The city of Stade and the Count of Stotel later joined. The confederates and Grand appealed for an arbitration and on 6 October 1314 the arbitrators, prelates, knights and city councillors, delivered the judgement that Grand should adhere to the practices and respect the privileges, which were usual under his predecessor Gilbert of Brunkhorst.

On 1 November 1314 Prince-Bishop Godfrey had died, and Grand took his revenge on the Chapter of Schwerin. He refused to consecrate Hermann II, the Chapter's Prince-Bishop elect. On 22 May 1315 Martin von der Hude informed Schwerin's Chapter, that Grand demanded 42,000 Bremian Marks in advance, then the price of a silver weight of 1,000 marks, for Hermann II's investiture. Grand requited the refusal to pay with an anathema, which he soon revoked. Meanwhile, also the city of Hamburg litigated Grand at the curia.

Grand started travelling within the Prince-Archbishopric proper, at its fringes (such as Ditmarsh and Rüstringen) and beyond in other parts of his diocese, hastily searching for a hideout and funds to pocket. In summer 1315 Grand participated in a synod of the archdeaconry in Jever outside of the Prince-Archbishopric proper, where representatives of the Bremian Chapter threatened Grand to depose him, if he would not reside again within the boundaries of the Prince-Archbishopric, as it were his duty. The public opinion about him sharply deteriorated: A prostitute in Norden (East Frisia), a part of his diocese but outside of the Prince-Archbishopric, recognising Grand in the street, and beat him up - a very embarrassing event. He was arrested twice (once in Wildeshausen). Finally he rested in the monastery in Wildeshausen, an exclave of the Prince-Archbishopric.

== The de facto Dismissal of Grand as Prince-Archbishop of Bremen ==
On 19 May 1316 the Bremian Chapter declared Grand to be insane and appointed Duke John, scholaster (headmaster of the school of the Bremen Cathedral) and a son of Duke Otto II the Strict of Brunswick and Lunenburg-Celle, as coadjutor of the See and administrator of the Prince-Archbishopric. Grand travelled to Avignon and sued the Chapter, but due to the papal sede vacante no decisions were taken. Jacobus de Rota, a papal collector, who had travelled the Prince-Archbishopric in 1317, described it as a hideout of robber barons. He reported the lower clergy, nobility, ministerialis and the common people wished Grand back as Prince-Archbishop. The new Pope John XXII, who personally knew Grand and esteemed him, thus refused to depose him.

Nevertheless, Administrator John continued to wield the power in the Prince-Archbishopric. Right after Grand's exile Isern Hinnerk was rehabilitated and appointed prince-archiepiscopal Burgmann in the castle in Ottersberg and bailiff in the pertaining bailiwick. In 1317 Administrator John arbitrated reconciliation between Ditmarsh and Count Gerhard III the Great of Schauenburg and Holstein-Rendsburg. Administrator John put Marcellus, a priest speaking up for Grand, to death.

== Grand's interference into the Prince-Archbishopric's affairs from his exile ==
On 27 March 1318 John XXII deputed Prince-Archbishop von Pernstein, Engelbert of Weyhe, Prince-Bishop of Osnabrück, and a canon of the Schleswig Cathedral to restitute the Bremian See to Grand. They meticulously investigated the discharge of Administrator John's office. After the intercession by Queen Jeanne II of France, the Pope acquitted Administrator John of the charge with the homicide of Marcellus.

Grand did not dare to return to the Prince-Archbishopric and therefore appointed Heinrich Dartsowe, a priest from Ratzeburg and later cantor of the Lübeck Cathedral, as his Vicar general. Dartsowe paid in return a high price for his investiture. He never entered the Prince-Archbishopric proper but mostly tried to recover the price he paid by collecting dues from the suffragan dioceses of Lübeck, Ratzeburg and Schwerin, which refused. In 1320 Dartsowe inflicted interdicts on Lübeck's Prince-Bishop Henry II and Schwerin's Prince-Bishop Hermann II, which were ordered to come to the curia to vindicate themselves. In the Prince-Archbishopric proper Administrator John wielded the power unchallenged.

Grand meanwhile lived in Paris, where – even after an admonishment by John XXII in 1321 – the St Denis Abbey refused to pay Grand the annual rent of 400 livres parisis. The dispute was only settled in 1326. Over the years Grand, the outstanding jurist, settled the different pending disputes between him and the suffragan dioceses, other persons and entities - represented by Burchard Grelle, then archdeacon of Rüstringen – at costly compensations to be paid to Grand and largely withheld by the curia as brokerage.

In 1322 the Bremian Chapter and the curia concluded a deal of unknown background. Administrator John was deposed, the Chapter paid 3,000 Bremian Marks for an unknown purpose, and Nicolaus Ketelhot, Prince-Bishop of Verden, and Dietrich von Xanthen, a canon of the St. Gereon's Basilica in Cologne, were appointed as new vicars general and new administrators. In 1324 Ketelhot confirmed all of Bremen's town privileges. After that he won the city of Bremen, the Bremian Chapter, Count Otto II of Hoya, Count John III of Oldenburg-Delmenhorst, and the Esquire of Diepholz to settle the feuds and uproars by a countrywide peace on 25 May 1325. Grand misgrudged Ketelhot his success and interfered by arbitrarily investing other persons as Vicars, each time pocketing an investiture fee.

Coloured by the opinion of his enemies and opponents, Grand's reputation and legacy suffered. However, he seems to have been a man of courage, business acumen and administrative ability, firmness and of principles, but also hot-tempered, cantankerous and reckless. Even in an age of great respect of the clergy, he lacked general support. The reason of his defeat was probably also that the power of the Pope was in decline.

Grand died on 29 May 1327 in Avignon. He was buried there the day after in the church of St. Mary. John XXII detained his residue from the Prince-Archbishopric of Bremen, which was highly indebted because of Grand. His estate consisted of 7,444 Guilders in cash, an additional 350 Guilders in foreign coins, a library estimated to 535 Guilders, as well as a diversity of silver tableware.

== Notes ==
Jens Grand House of Hvide Born: around 1260 Died: 30 May 1327
Catholic Church titles
| Preceded by Jens Dros | Archbishop of Lund as John II; 1289–1302 | Succeeded by Isarnus Tacconi of Fontiès |
Regnal titles
Catholic Church titles
| Preceded by Isarnus Tacconi of Fontiès | Prince-Archbishop of Riga as John IV; 1304–1310 (titular, never came to Riga) | Succeeded by Friedrich von Pernstein |
| Vacant Title last held by Bernhard, Count of Wölpe (1307-1310) and Florent, Count of Brunckhorst (1307-1308) rival prince-archbishops elect 1307–1310 rule by the Chapter due to sede vacante | Prince-Archbishop of Bremen as John I 1310–1327 | Succeeded by Burchard Grelle |
