= Grelle =

Grelle is a surname. Notable people with the surname include:

- Burchard Grelle (died 1344), German Roman Catholic bishop
- Jessie James Grelle (born 1985), American voice actor and writer
- Jim Grelle (1936–2020), American middle-distance runner

== See also ==
- Grella
