= Johann Rode von Wale =

- Prince-Archbishop of Bremen
- Church: Roman Catholic Church
- Archdiocese: Bremen
- Province: Bremen
- Elected: 30 January 1497 papally confirmed 28 April
- Predecessor: Henry II
- Successor: Christopher the Spendthrift
- Previous post: cathedral provost

Orders
- Consecration: 6 June 1497 by Bertold of Landsberg, Henry III of Minden

Personal details
- Born: Johann Rode von Wale; 1445 Bremen
- Died: 4 December 1511 (aged 65–66) Vörde
- Buried: Bremen Cathedral
- Denomination: Roman Catholic
- Residence: Vörde Castle
- Parents: Heinrich Rode von Wale; Anna Vagedes (Vaget/Vagts)
- Occupation: metropolitan
- Profession: scholar of law
- Education: Universities of Rostock and Erfurt

Johann Rode von Wale (c. 1445 – 4 December 1511, Vörde; distinguished from his namesake uncle as Johann Rode the Younger; also Johann Roden Bok, or Rhode, Latinised: Iohannes Rufus de Wale) was a Catholic cleric, a Doctor of Canon and Civil Law, a chronicler, a long-serving government official (1468–1497) and as John III (German: Johannes III.) Prince-archbishop of Bremen between 1497 and 1511.

== Family and early life ==
Rode was born c. 1445 in Bremen. He was a member of a patrician family of Bremen, recorded for holding political offices of the city since the 2nd half of the 13th century. The family was said to be also related by marriage with ministerialis and noble families in the Prince-Archbishopric of Bremen. Rode's father Heinrich Rode (died 1496) was city councillor in Bremen between 1484 and 1496, his mother Anna was a daughter of Bremen's burgomaster Borchard Vagedes (Vaget/Vagts; died 1512, burgomaster since 1482) and his wife Bartke Brede.

His namesake and paternal uncle Johann Rode the Elder (died 1477), like two further paternal uncles, Lüder Rode (Germanised: Lothar; died 1503) and Theodericus Rufus (Germanised: Dietrich Rode; died 1484, provost of the college in Ramelsloh), were also clerics, as cathedral provost, cathedral cantor (Domkantor), and ordinary cathedral canon (Domherr), respectively, with seats and votes in Bremen's cathedral chapter. Rode's brother Heinrich, son-in-law of Bremen's burgomaster Hermann von Groepelingen (officiating 1425–1435), served as city councillor of Bremen and their sister Margarethe (died 1513) was married to Bremen's burgomaster Heinrich Stenow, officiating between 1486 and 1506.

Being of successful bourgeois background the landed nobility in the prince-archbishopric considered Rode as a representative of urban commerce and economic interests and belittled him as a man of minor, shoemakers' descent. His family was most likely also invested in urban real estate, Buden (literally booths), rented out to the non-propertied classes.

== Career ==
In 1463, Prince-Archbishop Gerard III, a son of Otto III, Count of Hoya had died, the cathedral capitulars, with Rode's three uncles among them, preferred to elect him, however, Rode, with only 18 years too young, proposed instead Henry of Schwarzburg, who was five years older and then elected. Rode finished school as baccalaureus in 1464. In 1465, Rode started his studies at the University of Rostock, where he enrolled under Rector Johann Stammel. Due to his youth Pope Pius II confirmed Henry's election under the proviso that he would be only administrator until reaching the age of 27, which was in 1467. However, in 1466 Henry was elected Prince-Bishop of Münster, took residence in Münster in Westphalia and then never pursued his appointment as archbishop any more. Nevertheless, he is referred to as Henry II of Bremen, but Prince-Bishop Henry III of Münster.

Starting from Michael's day 1468 until 1485 Rode served as cathedral dean (Domdechant) of Bremen Cathedral. In 1468, already as dean, he enrolled at the University of Erfurt and was elected its rector on 2 May 1470. He had studied law and graduated as doctor of both laws from the University of Erfurt in 1474. He was also a scholar of the history of the prince-archbishopric. In 1485, the capitular canons elected Rode cathedral provost (Dompropst) of Bremen, a leading function including the presidency of the cathedral chapter (Domkapitel).

Rode's provostship fell into a difficult time since Henry II preferred to live in Münster. The Bremians considered him a bad administrator, too much a partisan of Münster interests and too involved in politics of the Holy Roman Empire. Henry conveyed the administration of Bremen to vicegerents, among them Günther of Schwarzburg and another of his brothers. Henry successfully reclaimed the lordship of Lechterseite of Delmenhorst, alienated by Gerard of Hoya in favour of his sister Catharina and her husband Maurice IV, Count of Oldenburg, even waging war against the usurping Count Gerhard VI "the Quarrelsome" of Oldenburg. However, while the overlordship and all the effort, such as pawning other Bremian estates to finance it, was from the side of the prince-archbishopric, Henry then annexed Lechterseite, regained in 1481, to his preferred Münster. Rode and the other members of the Bremian chapter disapproved this as alienation of prince-archiepiscopal estates. However, they could not help it.

Henry had a warlike temperament and involved in the imperial wars against Duke Charles the Bold of Burgundy, participating in the relief of the beleaguered Neuss in 1473. This was of no interest for Bremen, but also financed by alienating prince-archiepiscopal estates. In 1481 John V, Duke of Saxe-Lauenburg had redeemed the Saxon exclave Land of Hadeln, which had been previously pawned to Hamburg as security for a credit. John V had then made his son and heir apparent, Magnus, regent of Hadeln, situated at the Outer Elbe adjacent to the secular territory of the prince-archbishopric and underlying Bremen's archdiocesan competence.

In 1484, Hadeln's ambitious Regent Magnus, who aimed at increasing his local revenues, had reached out to conquer the rich Land of Wursten, a de facto autonomous region of free Frisian peasants in a North Sea marsh at the Weser estuary, but he failed. Magnus tried to justify his violent act with the pretence that Wursten used to be Saxon before the imperial deposition of Duke Henry the Lion and the carve-up of his Saxony in 1180, which only brought Magnus' Ascanian dynasty to take the belittled dukedom. The prince-archbishopric, claiming Wursten for itself, was alarmed. Wursteners so far little disputed Bremen's claim, as long as the prince-archiepiscopal rule had remained a light financial burden without major interference in their internal and external affairs usually decided in autonomy.

Through his work as cathedral provost Rode was experienced in government affairs and a proven diplomate. Johann Martin Lappenberg judged him as "one of the most excellent bishops of Bremen".

== Reign and archiepiscopate ==
After Henry's death in 1496 the enfranchised capitulars wanted a successor rich and thus independent enough and void of any princely aspirations. The majority of the canons of the cathedral chapters of Bremen and Hamburg (with only three votes) elected Rode archbishop on 30 January 1497, beating his election rivals John of Saxe-Lauenburg, brother of Magnus, and Otto of Oldenburg (a canon in Bremen and son of Gerhard VI). Family and friends among the capitulars helped Rode to gain the majority. On 28 April Pope Alexander VI confirmed Rode. This was accompanied by the papal invoice, the so-called servitia minuta and servitium commune, the latter making up a third of the annual revenues of a see.

On 1 May 1497, Rode issued his election capitulation (Wahlkapitulation), a document indicating much of the gravamina against Henry, to be prevented during Rode's reign. The capitulation stipulated the participation of the cathedral chapter in government affairs, guaranteed the capitular privileges, and forbade the future alienation of prince-archiepiscopal estates. Furthermore, the prince-archbishop was not to allow knights of ministerialis or nobility to build new fortified castles or manors of their own, but even to destroy unauthorisedly erected "new fortresses or fortified residences" (Low Saxon: nige veste offt waninge). The capitulation had been formulated by the cathedral chapter during sede vacante, thus Rode was one of its co-authors. Accepting and issuing the capitulation was an obligatory self-commitment of the incumbent of Bremen's see since the investiture of Prince-Archbishop Gilbert of Bronckhorst in 1274. The election capitulation formed part of the constitution of the prince-archbishopric, restraining the power of the ruler, organising the cooperation of the estates of the prince-archbishopric (Stiftsstände) and the ruling archbishop.

Rode's election capitulation committed him not to alienate further prince-archiepiscopal estates, to regain alienated and pawned estates, and privileges, to staff offices, such as the executive official of the prince-archbishopric, the landdrost, or the bailiffs (Vogt/Vögte, sg./pl.) on the castles with indigenous persons, who were not bound to foreign interests. Waging war would be only allowed to the prince-archbishop after consulting with the cathedral chapter and the estates of the prince-archbishopric.

The city of Bremen even demanded more, in a 1499 treaty between the city and the cathedral chapter the parties stipulated that the chapter must not introduce any future new archbishop, who did not commit himself by oath and a written deed (such as an election capitulation) not to pawn castles, not to wage war, and not to reduce anybody's privileges unless consented with chapter and city council. Rode's election rivals John and Otto were both sons of dynasties ruling neighbouring monarchies (Saxe-Lauenburgian exclave of Hadeln, Oldenburg), and had thus the smell of representing princely expansionism, entailing the weakening and belittlement of the prince-archbishopric.

On 6 June 1497, Rode received the pallium through the prince-bishops of Hildesheim and Verden, Bertold of Landsberg, and Minden, Henry of Schauenburg. On 14 September, Emperor Maximilian I invested Rode, the confirmed and consecrated archbishop, with the princely regalia, which made him the secular ruler of the prince-archbishopric, holding a vote in the imperial diet and that of the Lower Saxon Circle. Representatives of the subjects then rendered Rode homage and he was sworn in as ruler. Since Rode's predecessor Henry II never pursued his papal confirmation as archbishop, he was never invested princely regalia with the prince-archbishopric thus being banned from exercising its privilege of a vote in the imperial diet.

Right at the start, when levying from the prince-archiepiscopal subjects the homage tax (German: Willkommen/Willkommschatzung) and from all the clergy within his archdiocese the donum charitativum (also called subsidium caritativum) in order to recover the papal fees, Rode had to realise that a prince-archbishop lacking a local power base cannot assert himself. In fulfilment of his election capitulation, and in order to strengthen his position, Rode aimed at regaining and reassuring prince-archiepiscopal privileges and estates which had been pawned or alienated under Henry II. Between 1498 and 1500, he prompted the edition of the Registrum bonorum et Iurium Castri Vorde citra et ultra Oestam (Vörde Register), a register of all estates, privileges, easements etc. pertaining to Vörde Castle, the prince-archiepiscopal residence. By reclaiming estates and privileges he had to confront their then holders, causing conflicts with the knightage (Ritterschaft) among ministerialis and nobles.

The Stedingers, being no serfs or soccage farmers, but free peasants in the marshes on both sides of the Weser, revolted against paying the homage tax and found support in Stadland and Butjadingen, more northwestwards along the Weser, also inhabited by free peasants only accepting loose Bremian overlordship. When on 24 June 1498 Emperor Maximilian I invested Conrad of Rietberg, Archbishop Henry's successor in the diocese of Münster, with the regalia in the Prince-Bishopric of Münster, the deed also named territory as part of Münster, which was actually Bremian and had only been pawned to Münster by Henry. So Rode sued Prince-Bishop Conrad in the Rota Romana to accept Bremen's claim to the bailiwicks of Harpstedt, Delmenhorst's Lechterseite, and Wildeshausen. On 28 September, the same year Rode conveyed the bailiff house in Ottersberg to the cathedral chapter in compensation for debts which the late Henry had never repaid.

An external new conflict arose with the ambitious Regent Magnus in Hadeln, who planned a new conquest of Wursten. On 24 November 1498 John V and Magnus of Saxe-Lauenburg allied with Henry IV the Elder of Brunswick and Lunenburg, Prince of Wolfenbüttel to conquer Wursten. Henry IV obliged to send 3,000 lansquenets, who should gain their payment by ravaging and plundering the free peasants of Wursten, once successfully subjected. Rode had prepared for this, he and Hamburg's three burgomasters (upcoming, presiding, and outgoing), Johannes Huge, Hermen Langenbeck and Henning Buring had concluded a defensive alliance on 16 November. Hamburg feared for its exclave Ritzebüttel, its military outpost at the Outer Elbe to defend the free access to Hamburg via Elbe, thus the city became the driving force in preparing everything for an eventual attack.

However, Rode was surprised when in April 1499 Count John XIV of Oldenburg, brother of Rode's election rival Otto, waged war on the prince-archbishopric conquering with mercenaries Stadland and Butjadingen. This was the start of a series of campaigns to subject the free peasants in the North Sea and river marshes to feudalism, to wit Altes Land, Ditmarsh, Land of Hadeln, Haseldorf Marsh, Kehdingen, and Wilstermarsch, also known as the Elbe Marshes, Butjadingen and Stadland (today's Weser Marsh), as well as Stedingen, the Land of Würden, and the Land of Wursten.

Then Rode appealed at the burghers of Bremen, Hamburg and Stade, which considered the areas downstream the rivers Elbe and Weser their own front yard existential for their free maritime trade connections. Hamburg and Stade were already worried since John V had redeemed Hadeln in 1481, while Bremen was alarmed by Saxe-Lauenburg's expansionism into Wursten at the Weser estuary in 1484. So the three cities supported Rode, who further won the Ditmarsians, free peasants under Bremen's loose overlordship. On 1 May Rode gathered representatives of the Land of Wursten, just across the Weser opposite to Butjadingen, of the cities of Hamburg and Bremen and they concluded a defensive alliance in favour of Wursten in case of an Oldenburgian invasion.

Wursten was then threatened by the Oldenburgers under the command of the brothers Otto and Adolphus from the west and by Saxe-Lauenburg from the east. In order to avoid war on two fronts Rode tried to ease the relation with Regent Magnus, while intensive efforts to prepare defense were going on. On 1 August, Rode, Bremen's cathedral chapter, more prelates from the prince-archbishopric, as well as the cities of Bremen, Buxtehude, Hamburg, and Stade concluded a war alliance to supply 1,300 warriors and equipment to defend Wursten and / or invade Hadeln, while all members of Bremian ministerialis and nobility abstained.

Rode remained hesitant, in order not to provoke open disloyalty of the prince-archiepiscopal ministerialis and nobility, he tried to avoid the war. Many a member of ministerialis and nobility rather sided with Magnus. On 24 August, Hamburg admonished Rode to maintain the war alliance, finally accusing him for breach of contract in a letter to Hildesheim's Prince-Bishop Bertold of Landsberg. So Rode waged feud against John V of Saxe-Lauenburg on 9 September 1499. The allied forces easily conquered the Land of Hadeln, defeating Magnus and even driving him out of Hadeln.

While the cities wanted a peaceful front yard without powerful influence of whomsoever, the Ditmarsians were more in favour of autonomy of free peasants. Hamburg and the Ditmarsians fell out with each other. On 16 September a lansquenet hired by Hamburg slayed Cordt von der Lieth, a member of Bremian ministerialis, causing the Otterndorf Strife (Otterndorfer Streit). The lansquenet rumoured a Ditmarsian had slain von der Lieth and fled. Hamburg's lansquenets then attacked the uninvolved Ditmarsians and slayed 76 men in their military camp. Thus Ditmarsh cancelled its alliance with Rode, Bremen and Hamburg and the Ditmarsians returned home. Hamburg aimed at reestablishing its rule in Hadeln, as wielded between 1407 and 1481 during the pawnship.

By 20 November 1499, Magnus hired the so-called Great or Black Guard of ruthless and violent Dutch and East Frisian mercenaries, commanded by Thomas Slentz, prior operating in Oldenburg. Their invasion into the prince-archbishopric was repelled at Bremen, however, upstream they succeeded to cross the Weser in the neighbouring Prince-Bishopric of Verden near Verden city by the end of November, ravaging the prince-bishopric, especially looting and robbing the monasteries, heading northeastwards towards the Brunswick-Lunenburgian Principality of Lunenburg-Celle. Having crossed the latter's border the Guard turned westwards into the Bremian prince-archbishopric, by-passing the fortified Buxtehude and Stade, leaving behind a wake of devastation on the countryside and in the monasteries (Altkloster, Neukloster, both localities of today's Buxtehude, and the Himmelpforten Convent).

Since prince-archiepiscopal forces secured Vörde the Guard circumvented them southerly, not sparing the Zeven nunnery. Finally on Christmas Eve arriving downstream the Weser in Lehe the Black Guard tried to invade Wursten, however, the free peasants there repelled their attack near Weddewarden on 26 December. So the Guard turned northeastwards, looting Neuenwalde Nunnery underways, into Hadeln, repressing the joint forces of Rode and the cities – lacking support by Bremian knights and the Ditmarsians –, recapturing it for Magnus in early 1500. For the Hadelers, however, this invasion meant no less slaughtering, looting and incendiary than for the rural population in the prince-archbishopric.

By early December, Rode had to do what he exactly did not want to do, and had committed not to do in his election capitulation. Without sufficient military forces at his hand Rode turned for help to Duke Henry IV the Elder, who was actually allied with Magnus. In return Rode had to offer appointing Henry's 12-year-old son Christopher as his coadjutor, a position usually (as coadiutor cum iure succedendi), and in this case indeed, entailing the succession to the respective see. This exactly accomplished Henry’s the Elder own expansionist ambitions, so he quit the alliance with Magnus und John V and agreed to militarily support Rode. Rode, who had been elected to maintain Bremen's independence, thus had to deliver the prince-archbishopric to a successor, who would just weaken and subject it to princely interests.

Henry IV the Elder and his troops were now hunting the Black Guard. Magnus, unable to pay the mercenaries so that they turned even the more oppressive for the local population, was like the Sorcerer's Apprentice, who could not get rid of "the spirits that he called". By mid-January 1500 King John of Denmark hired the Guard and guaranteed for its safe conduct first southeastwards via Lunenburg-Cellean Winsen upon Luhe and Hoopte, crossing the Elbe by Zollenspieker Ferry to the Hamburg-Lübeckian bi-urban condominium (Beiderstädtischer Besitz) of Bergedorf and Vierlande. From there the Black Guard headed northwestwards again through Holstein in order to subject Ditmarsh. It were the Ditmarsians then, who destroyed the Black Guard utterly in the Battle of Hemmingstedt on 17 February 1500 and thus the Danish King John's dream of subjecting them.

Mediated by Duke Eric I of Brunswick and Lunenburg, Prince of Calenberg and Henry IV, Rode and Magnus had concluded peace already on 20 January 1500. Hadeln was restored to Magnus, while the Wursteners rendered homage to Rode on 18 August, who in return had confirmed their autonomy, thus in fact little had changed as compared with the status quo ante. The free peasants in Stadland and Butjadingen liberated themselves from the Oldenburgian yoke in April 1500. This increased their attitude of independence. Rode's administration calculated the damages caused by the Black Guard to be about 200,000 guilders, while the pay for the prince-archiepiscopal soldiers amounted to 10,500 guilders. This had deteriorated Rode's finances, who had to borrow 8,314 guilders from different creditors, many members of the cathedral chapter, and pawned them all the prince-archiepiscopal castles except of his residential castle in Vörde.

In the course of the inquiries for the Vörde Register Rode learned about the fact that the free peasants of Kehdingen had established their own bodies of representation (Hauptleute), and held jurisdiction with their own judges, ignoring the imposed prince-archiepiscopal reeves, about which Rode complained in 1500. In the Vörde Register Rode states that cruelty and pressure of the prince-archiepiscopal bailiffs against the serfs drove many into flight leaving behind deserted villages and untilled land turning into wasteland.

On 1 February, Rode and the cathedral chapter officially appointed Christopher, a foreign prince, as coadjutor. Rode and chapter had agreed to pay for Christopher's necessary papal dispensation from the canon-law age limit, he was too young to be coadjutor, while Duke Henry IV the Elder guaranteed military support for the prince-archbishopric. On 7 May 1501 Pope Alexander VI dispensed him from being under age, which cost the Bremian see 1,500 Rhenish guilders. Alexander VI confirmed Christopher as coadjutor under the proviso that he should only ascend to office having come of age (27 years), which was in 1514.

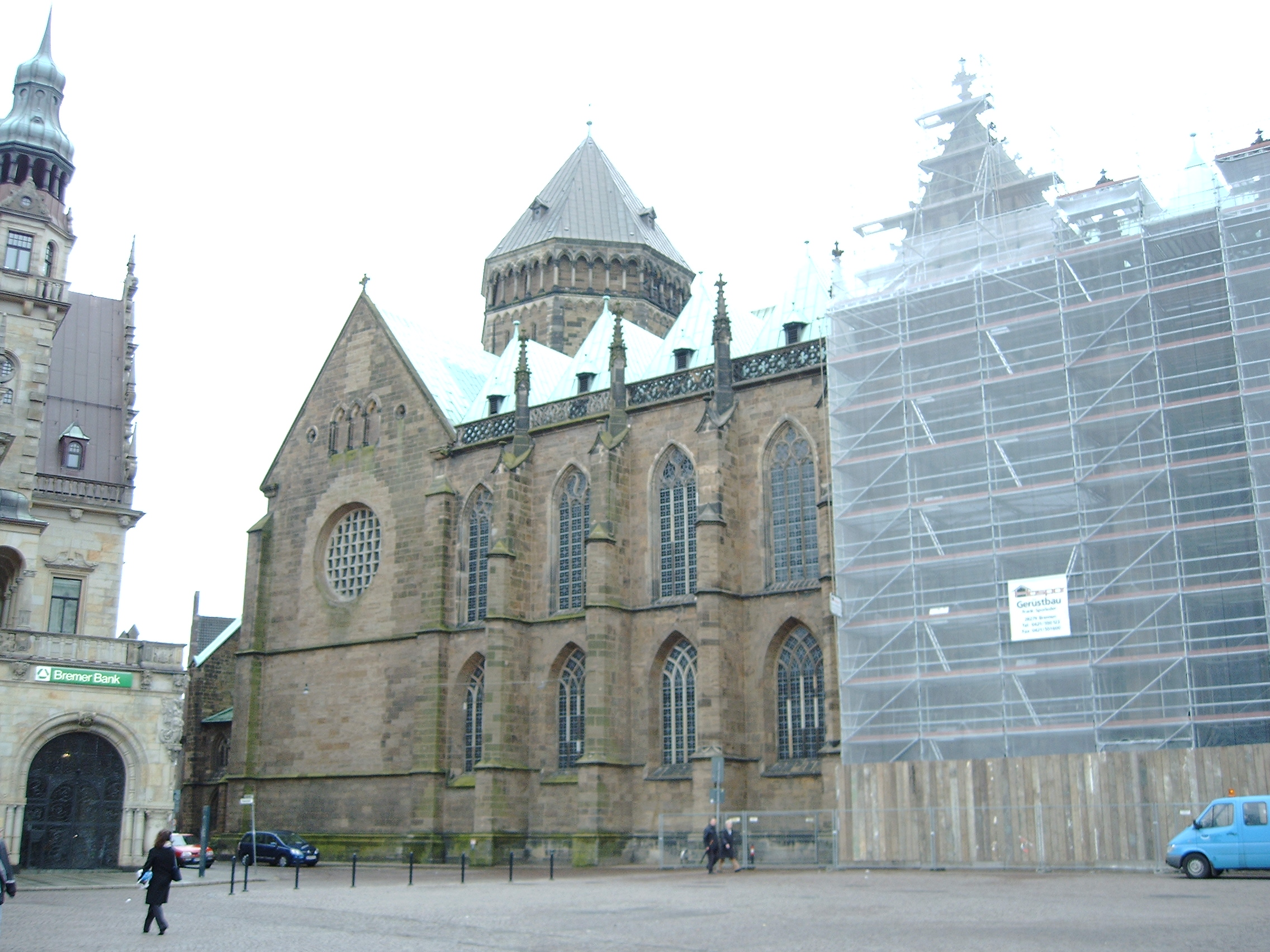
Bremen cathedral: The northern nave, commissioned by Rode, and the northern transept as seen from Domshof square.

Rode, supported by troops from Wolfenbüttel, successfully suppressed the Stedingers. On 25 May 1501, Rode concluded a treaty with Duke Henry IV the Elder, also joined by Count John XIV stipulating the subjection of Stadland and Butjadingen, with the Count of Oldenburg being promised the enfeoffment with Butjadingen as Bremen's vassal. In September 1501, Rode, supported by Wolfenbüttel and Oldenburg, failed to conquer Stadland and Butjadingen for the prince-archbishopric. The rest of Rode's reign remained peaceful.

In 1502, Rode's revenues improved, the cathedral chapter granted him an exceptional double procuration charge (Prokurationsgeld), which was levied from the archdiocesan clergy south of the Elbe. After Rode's appeal to the estates of the prince-archbishopric, meeting for Tohopesaten in Basdahl, they decided a onetime plough tax (Pflugschatz) on 23 April 1502, which amounted to 1,798 guilders collected by the chapter until 1503. These higher revenues allowed Rode to prompt the construction of the huge new northern nave to Bremen Cathedral, which is still preserved. Also the parapet of the rood screen in the western quire, an important piece of art, was commissioned by Rode and finished by Evert van Roden in 1512.

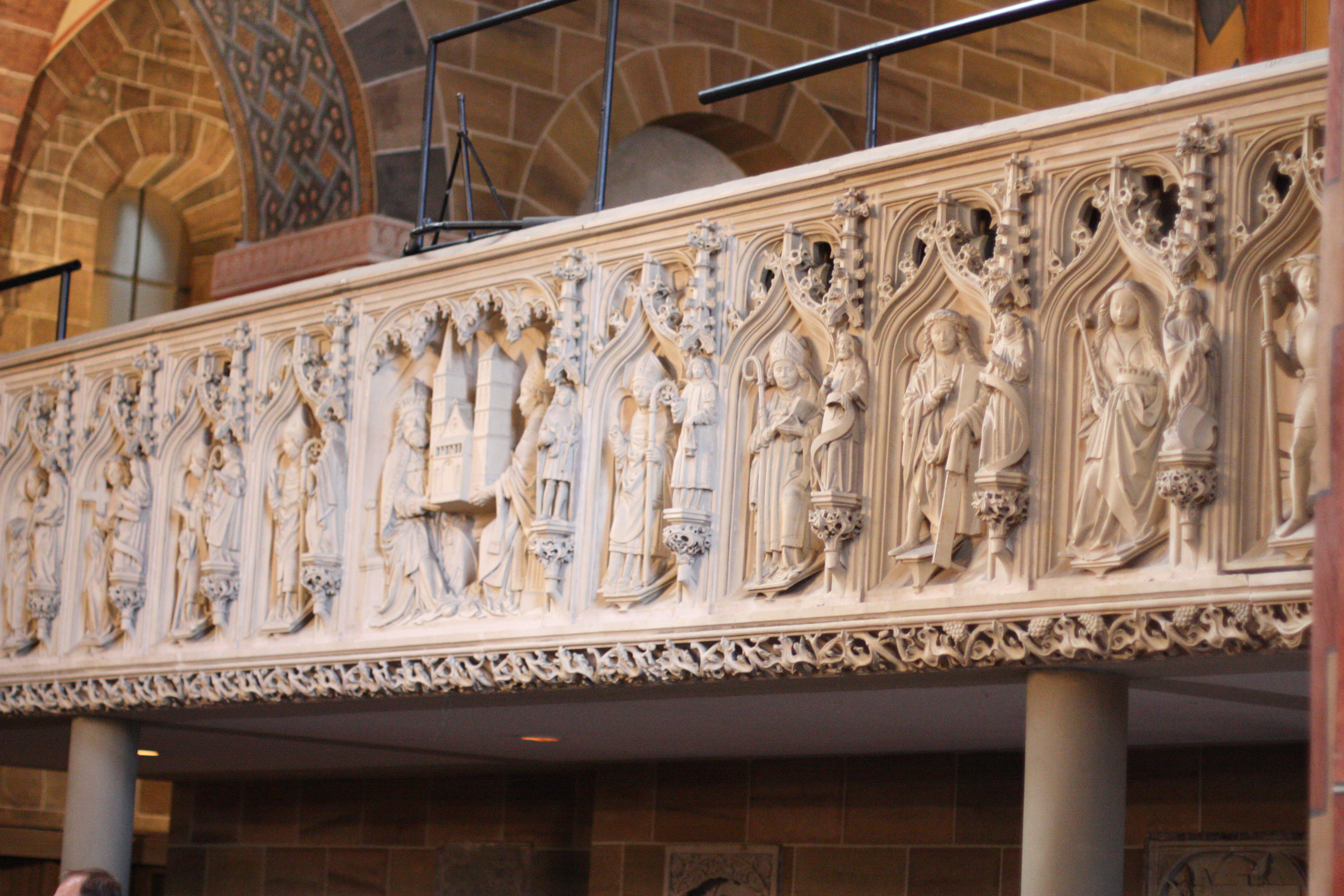
Bremen Cathedral: Parapet of the rood screen towards the western quire, commissioned by Rode

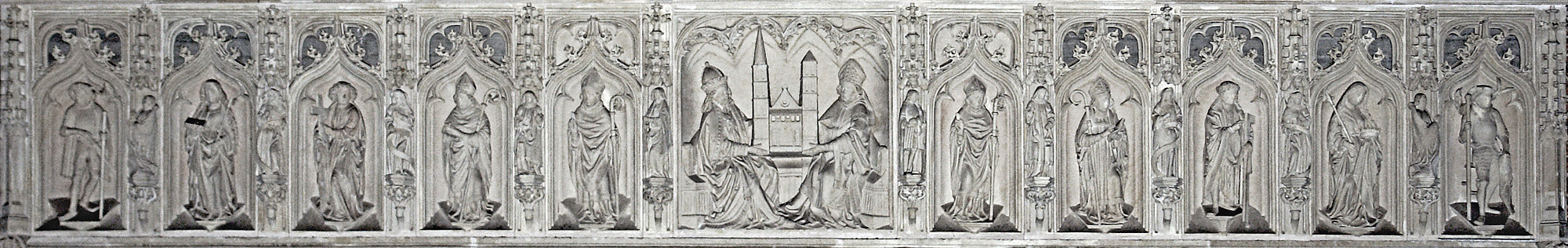
Bremen Cathedral: The sculptures on the parapet of the rood screen towards the western quire by Evert van Roden.

Rode's attempt failed to reclaim alienated Bremian territory in Alt- and Neubruchhausen, in the course of the succession squarrels on the extinct comital line of Hoya Lower County. In 1503, Rode and Edzard I, Count of East Frisia concluded a 5-year non-aggression treaty on the thing site in Lehe, near today's Geeste ferry. So Rode assured, that neither the East Frisians, aiming at subjecting Butjadingen, nor himself, having failed so far to do so, would take that area.

As to the interior, in 1503 Rode exceptionally broke his self-commitment (as in his election capitulation) of not allowing ministerialis and nobility to build new fortified castles of their own by permitting von der Lieth family to fortify their residence in Niederochtenhausen (a part of today's Bremervörde). Rode tried to prevent the new fortified manor house from becoming a vassal stronghold against him, the liege lord, but in vain, the von der Lieths gradually usurped deserted villages and arable land and settled them with their serfs.

Accompanied by Legate Cardinal Raymond Peraudi, Christopher, simultaneously Prince-Bishop of Verden since 1503, entered the city of Bremen in 1504 and Rode involved him more and more with government affairs. From 1505 on Rode lived a quite retired life in Vörde. Rode acquired the forested Wingst Ridge, previously an old Billungian possession, which he considered a private acquisition in favour of his family.

In c. 1508 Rode visited the Neuenwalde Convent in connection with his mission of reforming the convent along the lines of the Bursfelde Reform. Rode promoted a stronger adherence to the Benedictine rule and stricter claustration. During his visit he removed the previous prioress and, the convent elected Margarethe Eytzen their new prioress, whom he consecrated. In 1509, at Eytzen's request Rode issued a writ confirming her election and her power in all conventual matters. It also confirmed the nuns' right to freely elect their prioresses with the approval of the prince-archbishop.

In 1510, Rode reorganised Our Lady's Friary in Stade and the Archabbey in Harsefeld following the Bursfelde reform, also replacing the abbots of both monasteries. In Stade Rode then appointed a probable relative as new abbot, named Gerhard Rode. In 1511, Rode prompted the edition of the Missale secundum ritum Bremense. He recruited the prince-archiepiscopal councillors mostly from indigenous families, partially from cleric background, partially from ministerialis and nobility, only lower ranks were also staffed with foreigners. Stade's burgomaster Claus von der Decken was apparently the only higher-ranking official representing city interests.

Rode is famous for his works as statistician and chronicler. In 1498, he had ordered to compile a register, Registrum bonorum et iurium ecclesiae Bremensis, also known as Johannes Rhodii Chronicon Bremense, of all the franchises and privileges pertaining to Vörde Castle, which was still in progress in 1510. This register, partially re-edited by Gottfried Leibniz in 1710, is valuable because it goes far beyond the purpose given in its title. It includes information about customary law, copies of deeds covering the time between 1160 and 1507, dealing with treaties, decisions, decrees, memoranda, comments and forms used in all three fields of Bremian administration, the religious archdiocese proper, the Ecclesiastical Province of Bremen, and the secular prince-archbishopric. Rode prompted the compilation of similar land books (Latin: libri jurium, Low Saxon: Jördebôke; literally Earth Book), for the possessions in other prince-archiepiscopal areas, which, however, mostly have never been completed or were later lost, except of the one dealing with the southern Elbe Marshes (Altes Land, Hadeln and Kehdingen) and with Wursten.

With the comprehensive registration and listing of all privileges, estates and franchises Rode established a new office, the rent master (Rentmeister), first held by Matthäus von Hoya, in charge of collecting recurrent prince-archiepiscopal revenues. Rode also installed a chancery for the regular prince-archiepiscopal correspondence, and appointed a chancellor, Bertold Rese, a cleric from Mainz, recorded since 1509, thus establishing and stabilising a permanent bureaucracy.

Rode further rationalised the office of the landdrost, with the new incumbent Hermann von Mandelsloh, appointed in consensus with the chapter ("mit weteme und willen des … Capittelss") and sworn to strict instructions in 1500. Rode mostly enjoyed the support of the cathedral chapter among the estates. However, the relations to the cities were ambivalent. Rode enjoyed their support, when his and their interests were equal, like averting foreign intrusions, but he complained about their usurpation of privileges, collecting duties from merchants, he considered prince-archiepiscopal. Rode died on 4 December 1511 in Vörde Castle and was buried in Bremen Cathedral.

=== Landdroste during Rode's reign ===
Dates and names following Schleif:

- 1497–1499: Balthasar Schulte
- 1499–1500: Jürgen Bremer
- 1500–1505: Hermann von Mandelsloh (a.k.a. Koborch)
- 1505–1507: vacancy
- 1507–1510: Martin von Heimburg
- 1510–1515: vacancy

== Legacy ==
Rode's election capitulation became the blue print for those of his successors, repeating most of the contents and adding more restrictions developed from the experiences during the reigns of every deceased incumbent. Rode's grave slab is preserved now standing upright on the western wall of the northern transept in Bremen Cathedral.

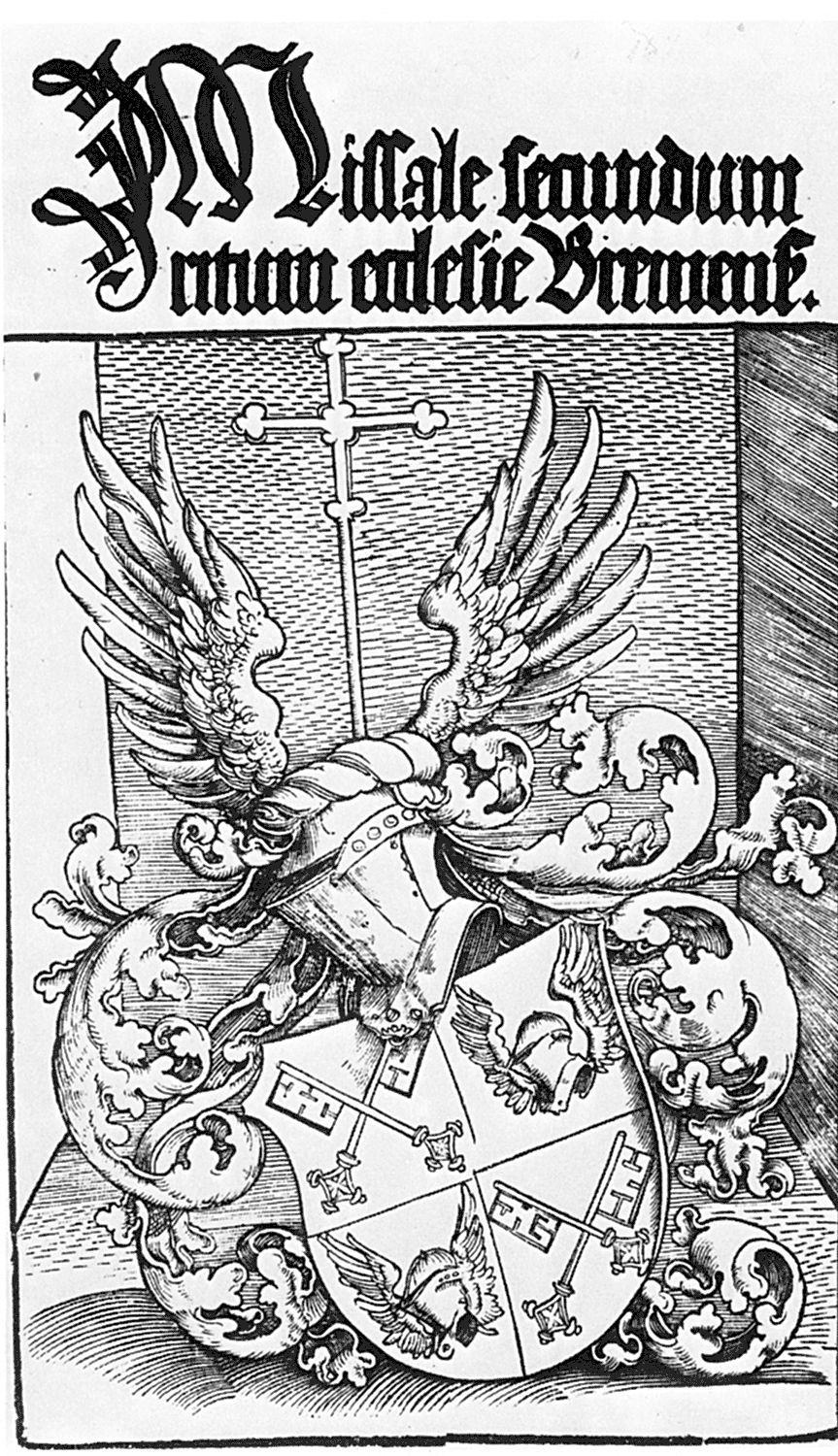
Rode's crest on the frontispice of his Missale Bremense

Rode's purchase of the Wingst Ridge for his family was later disputed by Prince-Archbishop Christopher, who claimed it as prince-archiepiscopal estate. Christopher wanted to enfeoff his son, Christian of Bremen (a.k.a. Carsten/Karsten Hillen) with the estate. However, Rode's nephew and namesake, Johann Rode, representing their family, defended the estate. In 1533 the dispute developed into a bloody feud involving Christopher's two prince-bishoprics, Bremen and Verden.

== Rode's coat of arms ==
Rode's coat of arms is recorded in Erfurt's enrolment list. It is also presented in the upper right and lower left quarters as given on the front page of the Missale secundum ritum ecclesie Bremense, which has been edited on Rode's instigation under his supervision, as shown on the right. Rode's coat of arms shows in an azure (blue) field two wings in or (gold) flanking a modest Jousting helmet in or turned dexter (shield bearer's right, but viewer's left). The crest consists of two buffalo horns in argent (silver) banded in azure flanking an argent helmet. The supporter, not shown here, is an ape-like haired wild man with face, hands and feet in gules (red), referring to the family name Rode, which means in Low Saxon the red (one), (Latinised: Rufus). On the front page of the Missale secundum ritum ecclesie Bremense the Rode family coat of arms combines in a quartering with the coat of arms of the Prince-Archbishopric of Bremen.

== Contemporary namesakes ==
The surname Rode and the given name Johann were quite common in Rode's lifetime. Therefore, he is sometimes confused with namesakes also serving as clerics.

- His namesake and paternal uncle Johann Rode the Elder (died 9 December 1477) was a cleric too. In 1426 Johann Rode the Elder advanced to canon at the Collegiate Church of St. Ansgar's in Bremen, later Protonotary and Corrector bullarum at the papal curia in Rome. Since 1457 Johann Rode the Elder served as cathedral provost first at Hamburg Cathedral and thereafter at Bremen Cathedral (1460–1477). In 1460 Pope Pius II sent him out as arbiter between the city council of Lunenburg and foreign prelates, negotiating in Lunenburg and Hamburg. However, only King Christian I of Denmark-Norway and Sweden solved the conflict in 1462.
- Rode's Hamburg namesake Johannes Rode (a.k.a. Johannes de Hamburgo) was a Carthusian from the Charterhouse Mariengarten near Prague, recorded for the years 1400–1430. He published the Epistole perutiles inter legendumq[ue] suaues: fratris Johannis Carthusiensis ordinis ad quosdam studentes Pragenses de Hamburg, whose third part is also known under the separate title: Viridarium clericorum.
- Magister Johann Rode, secretary of the Senate of Lübeck and as such delegated as patron of Our Lady Church there, later serving as dean. He was ridiculed in satirical songs between 1528 and 1530.
- Johann Rode, a canon of Lübeck Cathedral, who contributed an "Epigramma ad lectorem" to Hinrich Boger's poems published as Etherologium in 1506.
- Maybe one of the last two namesakes is identical with another Johann Rode, serving definitely until 1481, possibly until 1497, as Catholic priest in Lunden in Ditmarsh, subject to Bremen archdiocese and under Bremen's loose prince-archiepiscopal overlordship, whose work as chronicler shows a good knowledge of Lübeck.
- Dr. Johann Rode from Stadthagen (Urbin daginaeus), "Summus legatus" of Wittenberg, is mentioned in a work of Marschalkus Thurius in 1522.

== Works ==
- Johann Rode von Wale (Johann Roden Bok), Johannis Rode Archiepiscopi Registrum bonorum et iurium ecclesiae Bremensis, Richard Cappelle (ed.), Bremerhaven: Heimatbund der Männer vom Morgenstern, 1926.
- Missale secundum ritum Bremense, Strasbourg: Renatus Beck, 1511

== Notes ==
Johann Rode von Wale Born: 1445 in Bremen Died: 4 December 1511 in Vörde
Regnal titles
Catholic Church titles
Preceded by Henry II	Prince-Archbishop of Bremen as John III; 1497–1511	Succeeded by Christopher the Spendthrift
