= Burchard Grelle =

German archbishop

Burchard, Burghard or Borchard Grelle (died 12 August 1344) was a German Roman Catholic bishop. From 1327 to 1344 he was Archbishop of Bremen, one of only two commoners to be elected to that office (the other was Johann Rode von Wale), resulting in an unusually good relationship between the city and the archbishopric during his tenure.

== Life ==
From a family of citizens of Bremen, Grelle's father Volcmar was a member of the city council from 1296 to 1314. Burchard graduated MA at the University of Paris before becoming canon and then from 1310 archdeacon in Rüstringen, where he was able to mediate between the city of Bremen and the inhabitants of Rüstringen then living in Fehde. For a period he represented the archdiocese before the Roman Curia and after archbishop Jens Grand's death Pope John XXII appointed Burchard to the vacant archbishopric on 25 September 1327. He remained in the papal court in Avignon until 1328, receiving consecration as a bishop and the pallium. Politically he allied with the Curia against Louis IV, Holy Roman Emperor, with the pope working to weaken the Holy Roman Empire's power, though there are no known instances of Burchard openly acting against the Emperor.

== Bibliography (in German) ==
- Wilhelm von Bippen: Burchard. In: Allgemeine Deutsche Biographie (ADB). Band 3, Duncker & Humblot, Leipzig 1876, S. 555 f.
- Eckhard Danneberg, Heinz-Joachim Schulze (editors): Geschichte des Landes zwischen Elbe und Weser. Band II: Mittelalter. Landschaftsverband der ehem. Herzogtümer Bremen und Verden, Stade 1995, ISBN 3-9801919-8-2, S. 175–180.
- Friedrich Bock: Der Pontifikat Borchards von Bremen im Rahmen des Kampfes von Nationalstaat und Imperium. In: Bremisches Jahrbuch der Historischen Gesellschaft Bremen. Band 57. Schünemannverlag, Bremen 1957, S. 15–51.

Catholic Church titles
Preceded by Jens Grand	Prince-Archbishop of Bremen; 1327–1344	Succeeded by Otto I
