= Georg Alexander Ruperti =

Georg Alexander Ruperti (December 19, 1758, in Bremervörde – March 14, 1839, in Stade) was a German Lutheran theologian of the 18th and 19th centuries who also authored several notable works of classical scholarship.

== Life ==
Ruperti was born the son of an official assessor in Bremervörde. He studied theology and in 1809 became rector in Stade. In 1811 he was the first pastor in the village of Dorum, and in 1814 he became the superintendent of the general diocese of Bremen-Verden and consistorial councilor in Stade.

Ruperti was married to Elisabeth Maria Louise, née Wickhardt (1764–1836). The couple had a son, Justus. Ruperti's grandson was the theologian and Lutheran clergyman Justus Ruperti.

== Scholarship ==
Before his time as rector in Stade, he published, among other things, a "monumental", multi-volume commentary on the ancient Roman historian Livy, as well as works on the Roman poet Juvenal, between 1795 and 1798, ushering in a "new phase" in classical scholarship in Europe.

In 1816, academic George Ticknor, after a visit to Monticello, sent several volumes of German classical scholarship to Thomas Jefferson, the then-former president of the United States, including Ruperti's edition of Juvenal. Jefferson read them and thought highly of several of them, referring to Ruperti's Juvenal specifically as "first order" in a letter he wrote to Ticknor the following year.

== Sources ==
- Karl Ernst Hermann Krause (1889). "Ruperti, Georg". Allgemeine Deutsche Biographie (in German). Vol. 29. Leipzig: Duncker & Humblot. pp. 703–704.
- Philipp Meyer: Die Pastoren der Landeskirchen Hannovers und Schaumburg-Lippes seit der Reformation. Göttingen 1942/43
