= Berthold II of Landsberg =

Bishop of Verden and Hildesheim (died 1502)

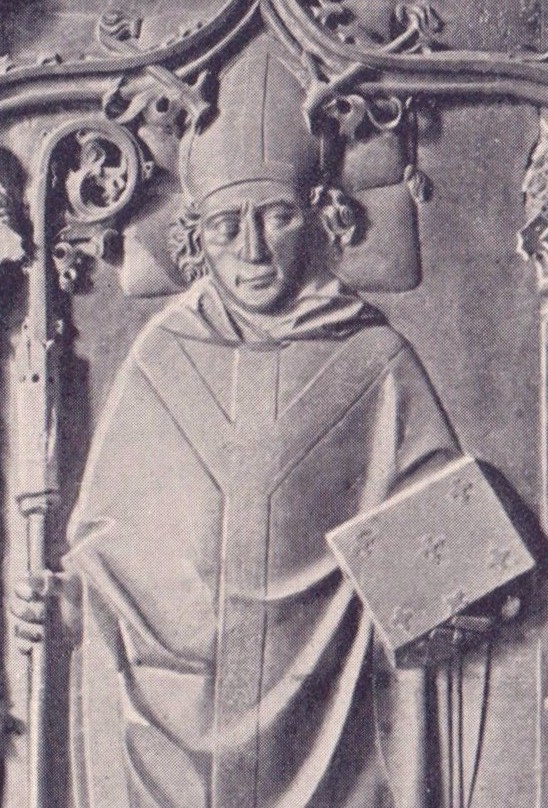
- Berthold's tomb
- Born: before 1464
- Died: 4 May 1502; Rotenburg an der Wümme
- Buried: Cathedral in Verden
- Noble family: House of Landsberg
- Father: Ulrich of Landsberg

Bertold of Landsberg (before 1464 – 4 May 1502 at the castle in Rotenburg an der Wümme) was bishop of Verden. He was also Bishop of Hildesheim as Berthold II.

== Life ==
=== Ascent to bishop of Verden ===
Berthold descended from the Lower Saxon Landsberg family (not to be confused with the Westphalian family of the same name). His father was Ulrich of Landsberg. He studied Law and obtained his JD degree. He became a canon in Verden and became a dean in 1464. From 1468, he administered the bishopric on behalf of Bishop John III of Asel, who suffered from ill health. In 1470, the cathedral chapter urged John III to abdicate and elected Berthold as his successor. His election was confirmed by Pope Paul II.

=== Bishop of Hildesheim ===
In 1472, Berthold and the city of Hildesheim support the candidacy of his cousin Henning of Hus as the next bishop of Hildesheim, against several other candidates. A feud ensued. Henning was unable to prevail against the provost and the local nobility. After another was with Brunswick and Hesse, he withdrew his candidacy in favour if Berthold. Berthold's appointment was confirmed by the pope and the pope also gave Berthold permission to continue to administer Verden.

=== Great feud ===
He tried to the financial problems of his bishopric with new taxes. In 1484, this led to a serious conflict with the city of Hildesheim, known as the "Great Feud". The citizens of Hildesheim even went so far as to take some of their bishop's vassals prisoner. Berthold countered with ecclesiastical punishments, such as anathema and interdict. Nevertheless, the city prevailed. As a result, the citizens began to strengthen the city's fortifications. Berthold ordered the city to revert the city wall to their previous size, but the city refused. War broke out again, with both sides plundering and looting the enemy's territory. In 1486, their differences were settled and a peace treaty was agreed. Nevertheless, tensions remained.

=== Foreign and domestic policies ===
Berthold concluded a treaty of alliance for a twenty-year period with Duke William I of Brunswick-Wolfenbüttel, who had been his predecessor's greatest enemy. However, it soon became clear that William would not support him in his conflicts with the local nobility.

Several North German cities concluded an alliance against their princes; Hildesheim was among them. In 1483, the cities of Brunswick and Hildesheim defeated Duke Henry VII of Brunswick-Lüneburg at Bleckenstedt in 1483.

In 1488, Berthold travelled to Rome to object to an unjustified papal ban against the bishoprics of Verden and Hildesheim. He never managed to get the local nobility under control. In 1500, a nobleman from the Schwichelt family convinced the pope to pronounce a ban against the church in Hildesheim again. In 1493, he concluded an alliance for a twenty-year period with archbishop Henry II of Bremen. However, Henry's successor John III cancelled this alliance.

=== Promoting religion and culture ===
Because of the unsettled conditions in Hildesheim, Berthold resided mostly in the castle of Rotenburg an der Wümme in the Bishopric of Verden. He supported church activities. He patronized the cult of the Eucharist and the worship of Saint Anne and the patron saint of the diocese. During his reign, the monasteries of Isenhagen, Ringelheim and Grauhof were reformed. The construction of the nave of Verden Cathedral began during his reign.

Berthold died on 4 May 1502 and was buried in Verden Cathedral. A cast bronze grave stone has been preserved to this day.

Berthold II of Landsberg House of Landsberg Born: before 1464 Died: 4 May 1502
Catholic Church titles
Regnal titles
Preceded by John III of Asel	Prince-Bishop of Verden; 1470–1502	Succeeded by Christopher of Brunswick-Wolfenbüttel
Preceded by Henning of Hus	Prince-Bishop of Hildesheim; 1481–1502	Succeeded by Eric of Saxe-Lauenburg
