= Grella =

Grella is an Italian surname. Notable people with the surname include:

- Mike Grella (born 1987), American soccer player
- Vince Grella (born 1979), Australian footballer

== See also ==
- Grelle
