= Basdahl =

- Municipality
- Flag Coat of arms

- Location of Basdahl within Rotenburg (Wümme) district
- Interactive map of Basdahl
- Location within Germany Location within Lower Saxony
- Coordinates: 53°26′36″N 09°00′11″E
- Country: Germany
- State: Lower Saxony
- District: Rotenburg (Wümme)
- Municipal assoc.: Geestequelle
- Subdivisions: 3

Government
  - Mayor: Heiko Wendte (SPD)

Area
  - Total: 32.34 km^{2} (12.49 sq mi)
- Elevation: 24 m (79 ft)

Population (2025-12-31)
  - Total: 1,496
  - Density: 46.26/km^{2} (119.8/sq mi)
- Time zone: UTC+01:00 (CET)
  - Summer (DST): UTC+02:00 (CEST)
- Postal codes: 27432
- Dialling codes: 04766
- Vehicle registration: ROW
- Website: www.basdahl.de

Basdahl is a municipality in the district of Rotenburg, in Lower Saxony, Germany.

== History ==
Basdahl belonged to the Prince-Archbishopric of Bremen, established in 1180. Its parliament, the Bremian Estates (German: Stiftsstände), convened in diets (Tohopesaten or Landtage) usually in Basdahl, with Bremervörde serving as capital with the prince-archiepiscopal residence and seat of government (as of 1219). The Bremian chapter had its seat in the city of Bremen. In 1648 the Prince-Archbishopric was transformed into the Duchy of Bremen, which was first ruled in personal union by the Swedish Crown - interrupted by a Danish occupation (1712–1715) - and from 1715 on by the Hanoverian Crown. The estates met then much less frequent, because the Swedish rulers tried to discard the estates influence in legislation.

In 1807 the ephemeric Kingdom of Westphalia annexed the Duchy, before France annexed it in 1810. In 1813 the Duchy was restored to the Electorate of Hanover, which - after its upgrade to the Kingdom of Hanover in 1814 - incorporated the Duchy in a real union and the Ducal territory, including Basdahl, became part of the new Stade Region, established in 1823. Basdahl's historical role in the prince-archbishopric is commemorated in its coat-of-arms showing on the left side the crisscrossed keys, the coat-of-arms of the prince-archbishopric.
