= Bremervörde Castle =

Local museum in Germany

Coordinates: 53°28′59″N 9°09′05″E

Bremervörde Castle (German: Schloss Bremervörde), also called Vörde Castle, in the German town of Bremervörde in northern Lower Saxony was the largest fortification in the region. It was slighted in 1682 after various military conflicts and largely demolished. Today, the surviving chancery building (Kanzleigebäude) houses a museum.

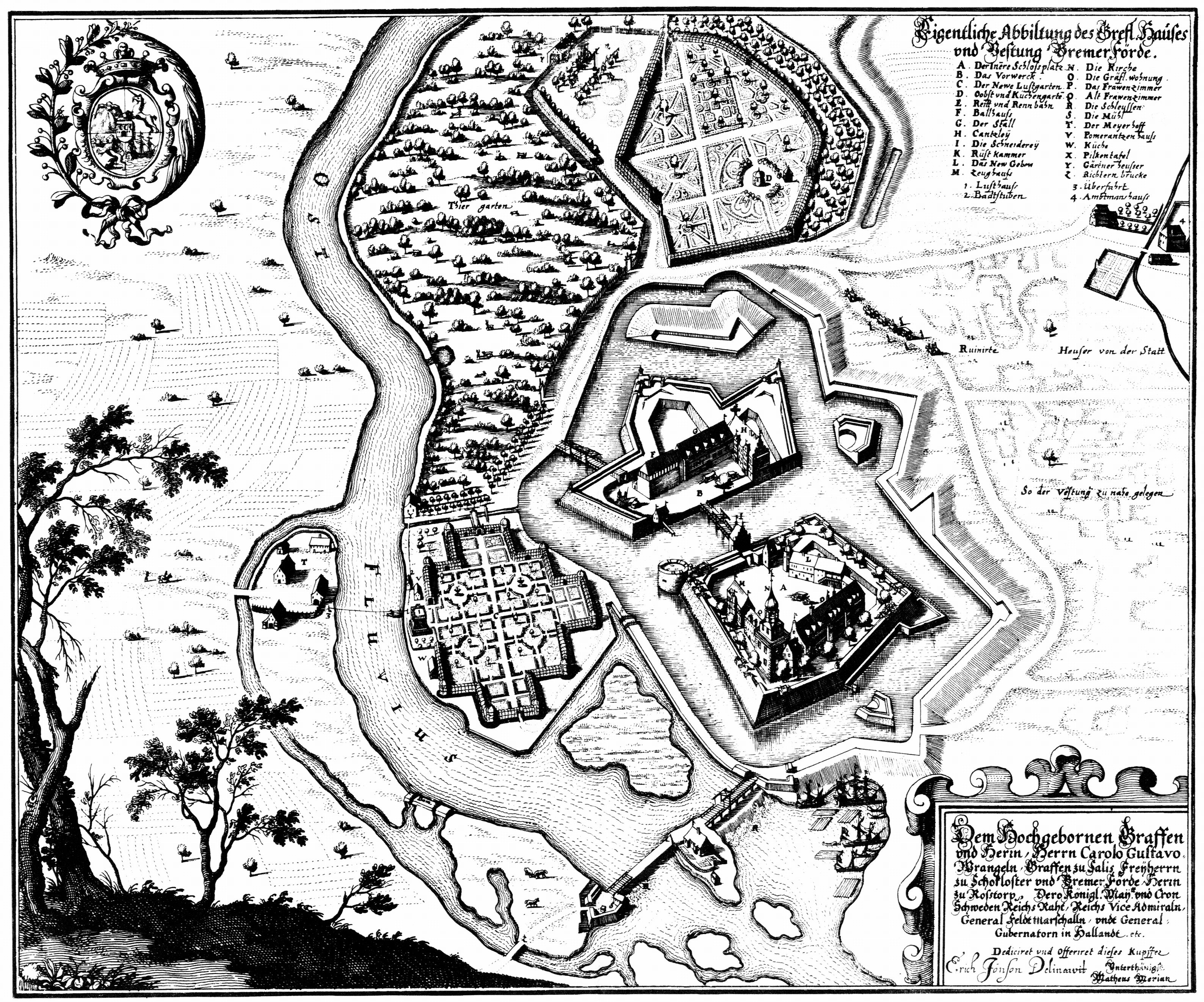
The castle in 1653 in a drawing by Merian. Above the castle island the surviving, L-shaped chancery may be made out in the centre of the outwork

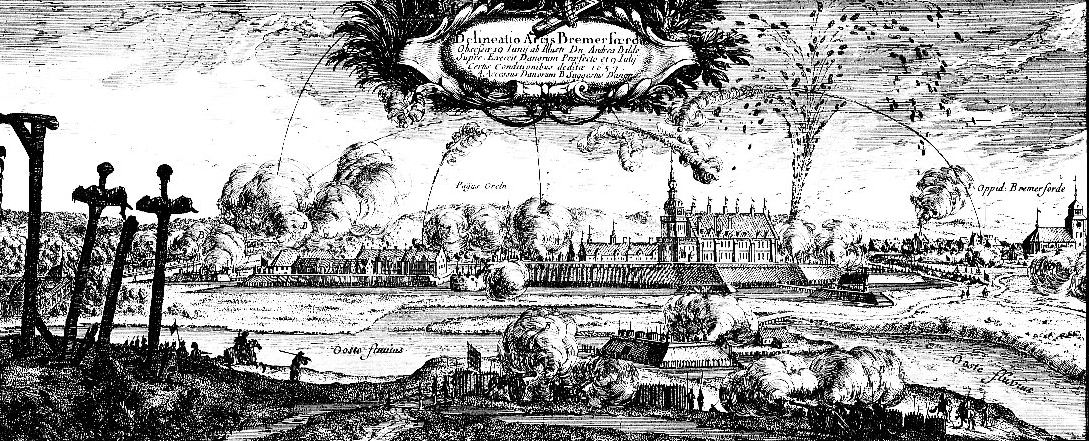
The shelling of Bremervörde and its castle (right) in 1657

== From medieval castle to stately home ==
The first castle on the site of the subsequent stately home was built in the early 12th century, between 1112 and 1122, at the behest of Lothair III. Because there was a ford here over the River Oste and the site was on the historic Ox Road, the location was of strategic importance.

The castle, known in Latin documents as Castrum Voerde ("Vörder Castle"), fell into the hands of various owners as a result of disputes. For example, it went from the counts of Stade to Henry the Lion and finally, in 1219, to the Archbishopric of Bremen. Roughly located in the centre of the bishopric, the castle grew during the course of the centuries that followed, into the greatest fortress in the region and the headquarters of the central administration of the episcopal estates and the district advocates. The castle was used as a residenz by several of the bishops of Bremen and gradually extended and converted into a stately home or schloss. From the 16th century onwards, the construction material used for the castle came mainly from the brickworks in the neighbouring town of Bevern.

At the outset of the Thirty Years' War the castle consisted of a fortified island in the Oste, which protected the ostentatious, multi-winged, Renaissance house. The castle island opposite had an outwork protected by bastions and south and east of the castle were several courtly pleasure gardens and vegetable gardens.

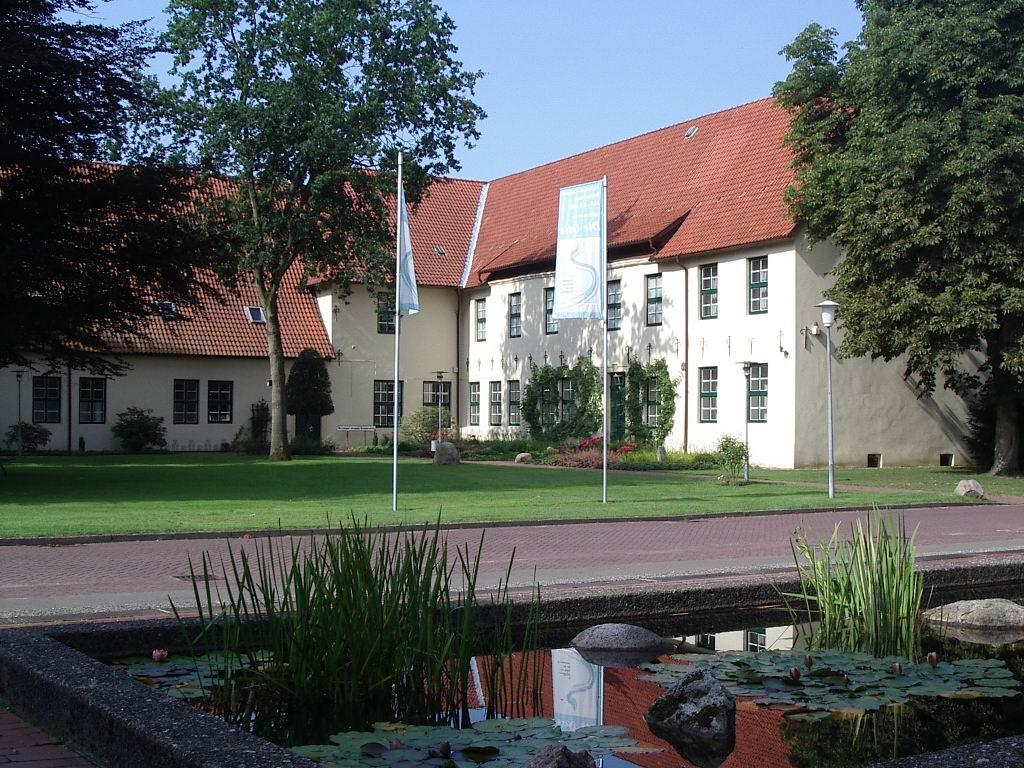
The old chancery building which houses the Bachmann Museum today

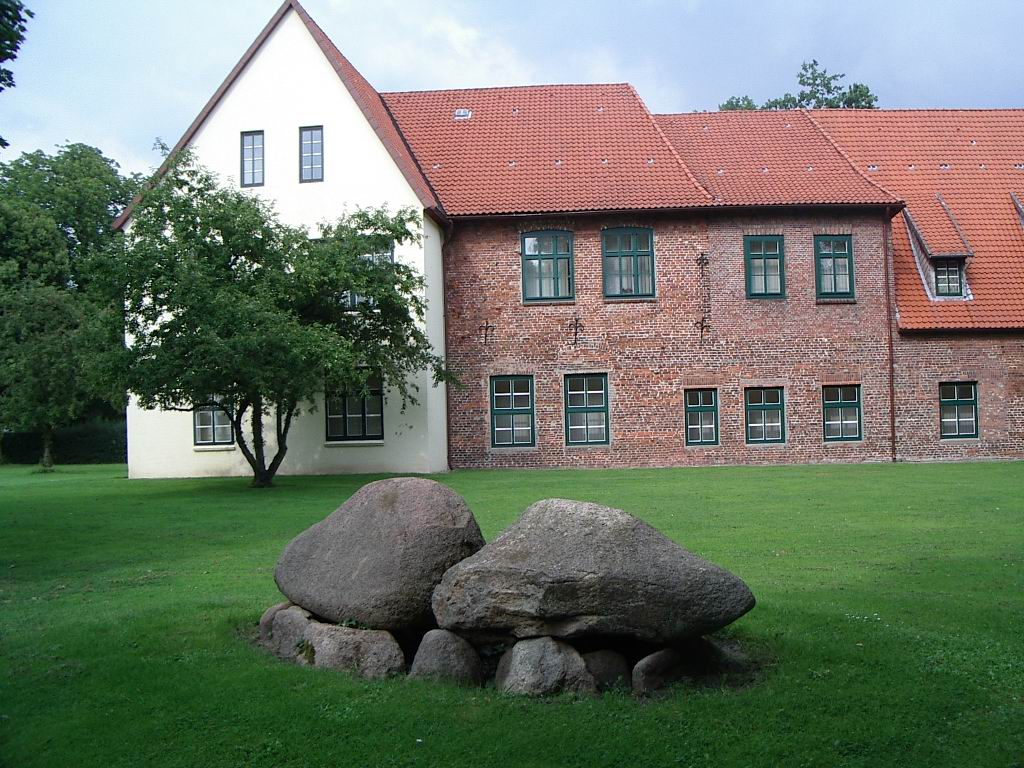
The rear of the old chancery building

During the course of the war, the town and the castle were besieged in 1627 and 1646 and badly damaged. The castle endured a further siege in 1657 in the Dano-Swedish War. During the period of Swedish rule the new lords moved their seat of government to Stade and into the newly built country house of Agathenburg, so the older, very extensive castle in Bremervörde waned in importance. One of its owners during this period was Swedish field marshal Carl Gustaf Wrangel. In 1682, much of the fortress was slighted and the ruins of the house and defensive works were dismantled. Some of the construction material thus made available was used to build the Swedish Warehouse (Schwedenspeicher) in Stade.

== Literature ==
- Ernst Andreas Friedrich: Die Burg Bremervörde, pp. 49–50, in: Wenn Steine reden könnten, Band III, Landbuch-Verlag, Hanover, 1995, ISBN 3-7842-0515-1.
