= Assault on Eda Sconce =

Assault on a Swedish sconce in 1658

Assault on Eda sconce
- Part of the Dano-Swedish War (1657–1658)
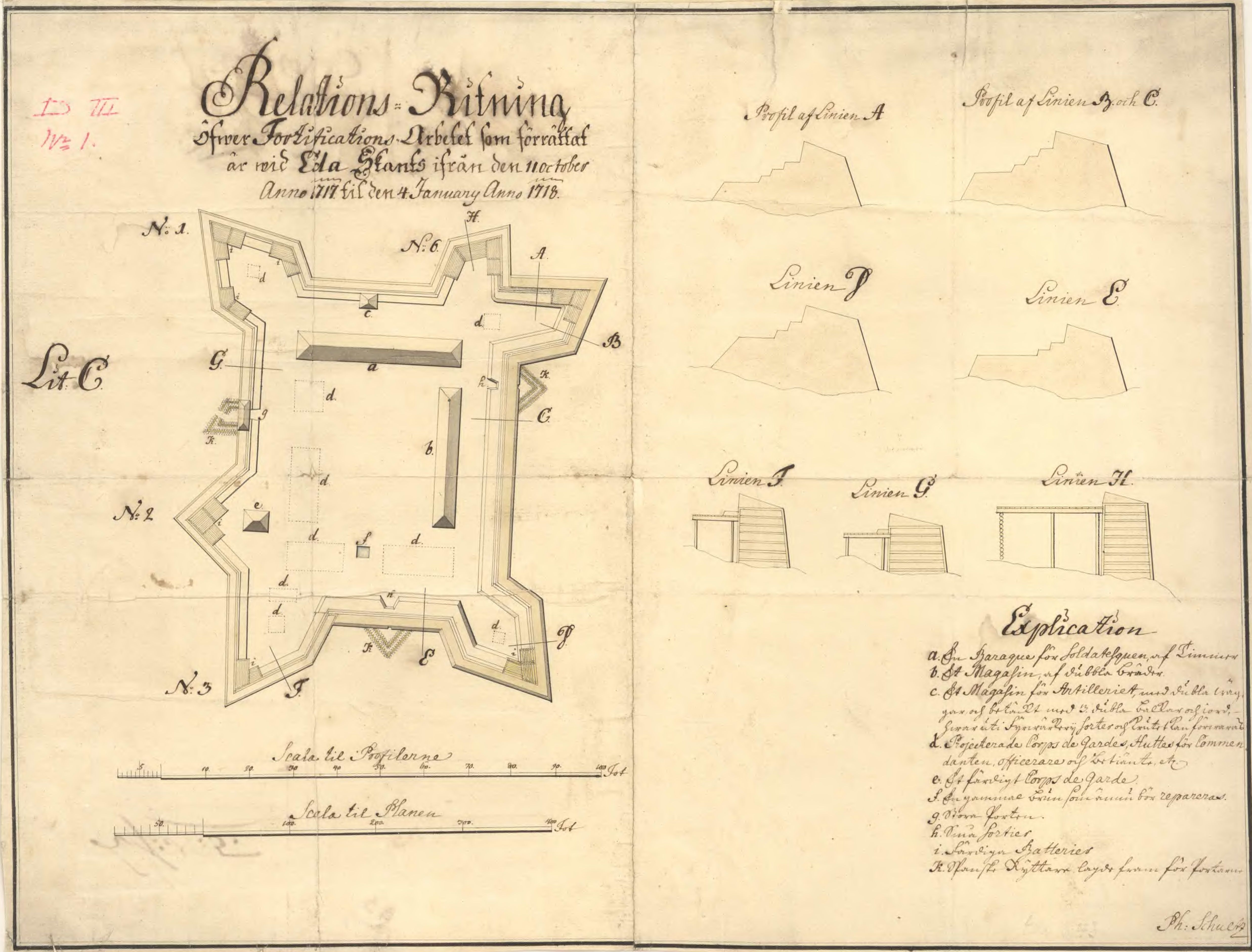
- Map showing the work done at Eda sconce in 1717
Date	11 February 1658
Location	Eda sconce, Värmland
Result	Swedish victory
Territorial changes	Norwegians retreat back into Norway

Belligerents
(yes) Swedish Empire	Denmark–Norway

Commanders and leaders
(Swedish Empire) Clas Fleming (WIA) (Swedish Empire) Christenstein (WIA) (Swedish Empire) Oluf Pärsson	(Denmark–Norway) Michael Opitz

Units involved
(Swedish Empire) Eda sconce garrison	(Denmark–Norway) Akershus regiment (Note: Parts of it)

Strength
875–1,900 men 12 guns	309 men

Casualties and losses
25 killed 20 wounded	20 killed

The Assault on Eda sconce was an incident on 11 February 1658, when a Norwegian force under Michael Opitz attacked the Swedish Sconce at Eda. The Norwegians were successful at first, but were later repelled by the Swedish artillery fire, forcing them to withdraw. The fighting lasted for 2 hours.

== Background ==
In Värmland, the strongest part of the Swedish defense was Eda Sconce in the road between Åmotfors and Arvika. There, Generalmajor Gustaf Oxenstierna had stationed 660 men until he was ordered to take the majority of this force towards Vänersborg. Oxenstierna realized how it was very dangerous to thin out the garrison in Eda Sconce which now meant that he did not want to take responsibility for it, however, he nonetheless went to Vänersborg with most of the troops. As his replacement, Clas Fleming was chosen to be his successor. At the time of his accession to the post of commander, Eda skans had a garrison strength of 201 soldiers, most of which were veterans, along with a company of peasants consisting of 114 men. There was also an additional 560 peasants spread out in multiple reconnaissance towers.

Eda Sconce was large and well-built and defended with 12 cannons. However, for an effective defence, Fleming needed far more men than he had available. A reasonable garrison force would have been around 1,500 men, although some sources claim that the Sconce had 1,700 soldiers and 200 cavalry at the time of the storming.

For the entire autumn, it was calm in Eda Sconce, and no Norwegians were spotted, which led to a relative calm spreading among Fleming and his troops.

=== Prelude ===
On 11 February 1658, everything suddenly broke loose; poor reconnaissance had allowed Fleming to be taken by surprise by the Norwegian assault. The Norwegian force, under Michael Opitz, had skilfully walked around and avoided the peasant guards at the border without being spotted. They sneaked across unpaved roads up to Eda Sconce under the night.

== Assault ==
The Norwegian assault came like "thunder from a clear sky"; the Swedes reacted with dismay, and several of them began fleeing when the Norwegians, some 309 men from the Akershus regiment, entered the Sconce. The peasant troops folded immediately, along with some 30 cavalrymen. The last line of defence was the officers and veterans, who resisted the assaulting Norwegians. Fleming wrote the following report about the attack:

... måste altså jag med mina Officerare, och en fendrich ... stå uthi sticket, så att Jagh blef skutin medh een förgiftad kuhle igenom armen, min Capitein Lieutenant (Christenstein) skutin genom låhret, och min Fendrich niderstuckin på Skantzen, så väl som een af mine Officerare..."

Rough translation:

"... I, along with my officers and an ensign, had to stand in the open, so I was shot with a poisoned bullet through the arm, my captain lieutenant (Christenstein) was shot through the thigh, and my ensign was stabbed at the redoubt, as well as one of my officers..."

Fleming was also hit in the head with a sword, which led to him being led away from the Sconce during the evening.

However, the luck began to turn. The Swedes, with the help of their cannons, managed to repel the Norwegians. They quickly returned, however, and launched a new attack, which was also repelled. The Swedish success can be largely attributed to Oluf Pärsson, who effectively led the cannon fire.

== Aftermath ==
Since the fighting lasted no more than two hours, the casualties were relatively small, the losses were as follows:

=== Losses ===
==== Swedish losses ====
- 25 killed
- 20 wounded, including Fleming and Christenstein

==== Norwegian losses ====
- 20 killed
- Many wounded

After the failed assault, the Norwegians retreated back across the border without being stopped.

== Works cited ==
- Essen, Michael Fredholm (2023). Charles X's Wars: Volume 3 - The Danish Wars, 1657-1660. Helion & Company. p. 188. ISBN 9781915113603.
- Isacsson, Claes-Göran (2015). Karl X Gustavs krig: Fälttågen i Polen, Tyskland, Baltikum, Danmark och Sverige 1655-1660 [Wars of Charles X Gustav: The campaigns in Poland, Germany, the Baltics, Denmark and Sweden 1655-1660] (in Swedish). Historiska Media. pp. 128–129. ISBN 9789175450117.
- Wolke, Lars Ericson (2014). 1658: Tåget över bält [1658: March across the Belts] (in Swedish). Historiska Media. p. 90. ISBN 9789187031984.
