= Bremervörde =

- Town
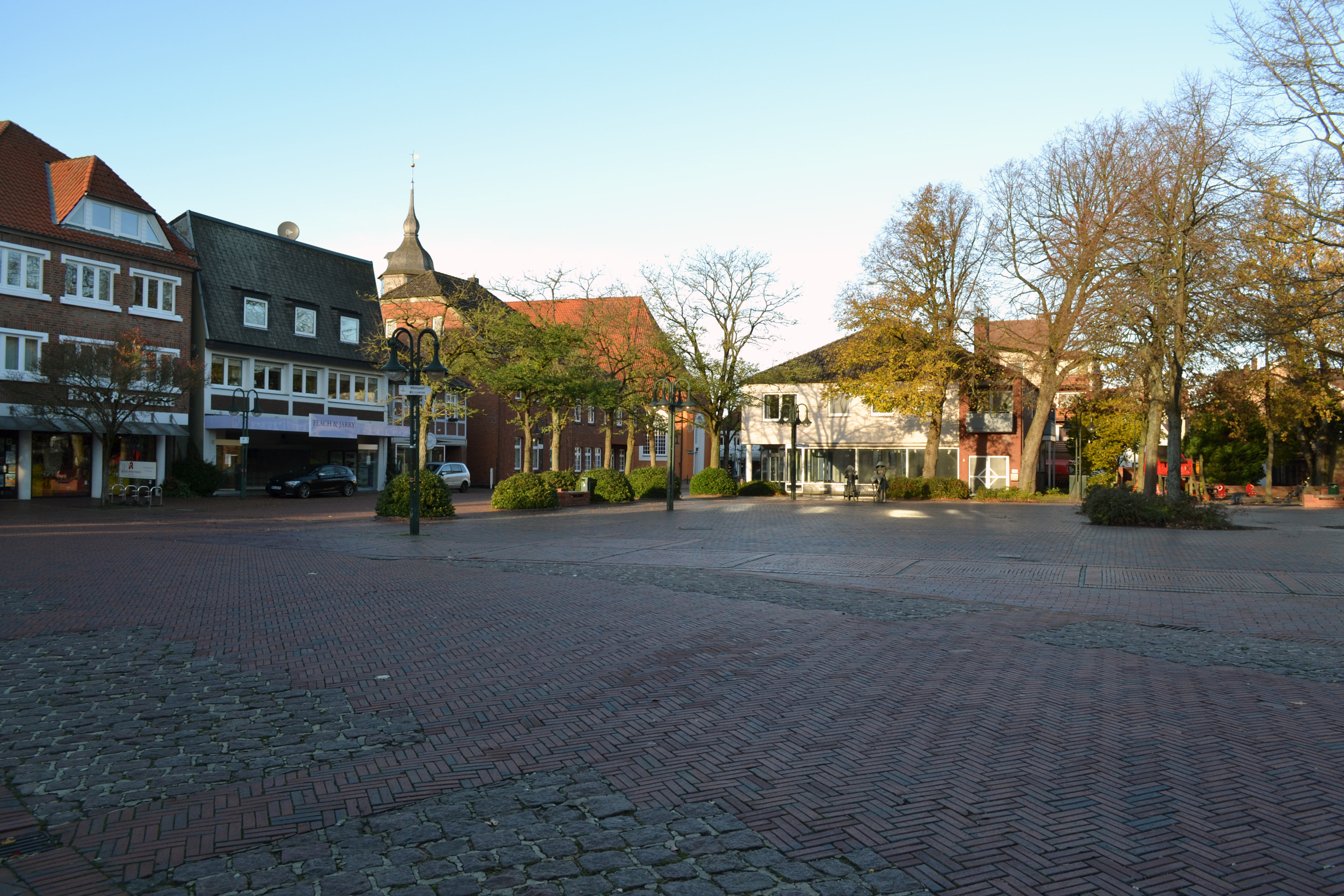
- Market square

- Coat of arms

- Location of Bremervörde within Rotenburg (Wümme) district
- Interactive map of Bremervörde
- Location within Germany Location within Lower Saxony
- Coordinates: 53°29′N 9°8′E
- Country: Germany
- State: Lower Saxony
- District: Rotenburg (Wümme)

Government
  - Mayor (2021–26): Michael Hannebache (Ind.)

Area
  - Total: 150.18 km^{2} (57.98 sq mi)
- Elevation: 4 m (13 ft)

Population (2025-12-31)
  - Total: 18,409
  - Density: 122.58/km^{2} (317.48/sq mi)
- Time zone: UTC+01:00 (CET)
  - Summer (DST): UTC+02:00 (CEST)
- Postal codes: 27432
- Dialling codes: 04761
- Vehicle registration: ROW, BRV
- Website: www.bremervoerde.de

Bremervörde (German pronunciation: [ˌbʁeːmɐˈføːɐ̯də]) is a town in the north of the district (Landkreis) of Rotenburg, in Lower Saxony, Germany. It is situated on the Oste river near the centre of the "triangle" formed by the rivers Weser and Elbe, roughly equidistant from the cities of Hamburg, Bremen and Cuxhaven.

== Division of the town ==

The municipality Bremervörde consists beside the town Bremervörde of the villages Bevern, Elm, Hesedorf, Hönau-Lindorf, Nieder Ochtenhausen, Iselersheim, Mehedorf, Minstedt, Ostendorf, Plönjeshausen and Spreckens.

== History ==
By 1111 the Saxon Duke Lothair of Supplinburg, later king of the Holy Roman Empire, erected castrum vorde, the Vörde Castle at an Oste ford, important for the Oxen Way, an ancient trackway connecting Jutland with Westphalia.

Because of the strategically advantageous location between the rivers Elbe and Weser it was a matter of conflicts in the following centuries. Later it came under the control of Henry the Lion and then, in 1219, it fell under the control of the Prince-Archbishopric of Bremen, providing functions as capital with the prince-archiepiscopal residence and seat of government. The parliament, the Bremian Estates, convened at other places (usually in Basdahl), the Bremian cathedral chapter had its seat in the city of Bremen.

Maurice of Oldenburg (d. 1368), serving as Diocesan Administrator of Bremen since 1345, ruled the prince-archbishopric from Vörde. When the new Prince-Archbishop Albert II, invested in 1360, tried to depose him Maurice entrenched in Vörde Castle. Only after Albert's brothers Magnus II Torquatus, Duke of Brunswick and Lunenburg, Prince of Wolfenbüttel, and Louis, and the latter's father-in-law William II, Duke of Brunswick and Lunenburg (Celle line) and their Wolfenbüttelian and Cellean troops had beleaguered the Vörde in January 1362, Maurice signed his resignation.

The prince-archbishops added up for the development of Vörde. Prince-Archbishop John III (d. 1511), founded a hospital and infirmary, renovated in 1576 by Administrator Henry III, who also else contributed to Vörde's prosperity as a market town.

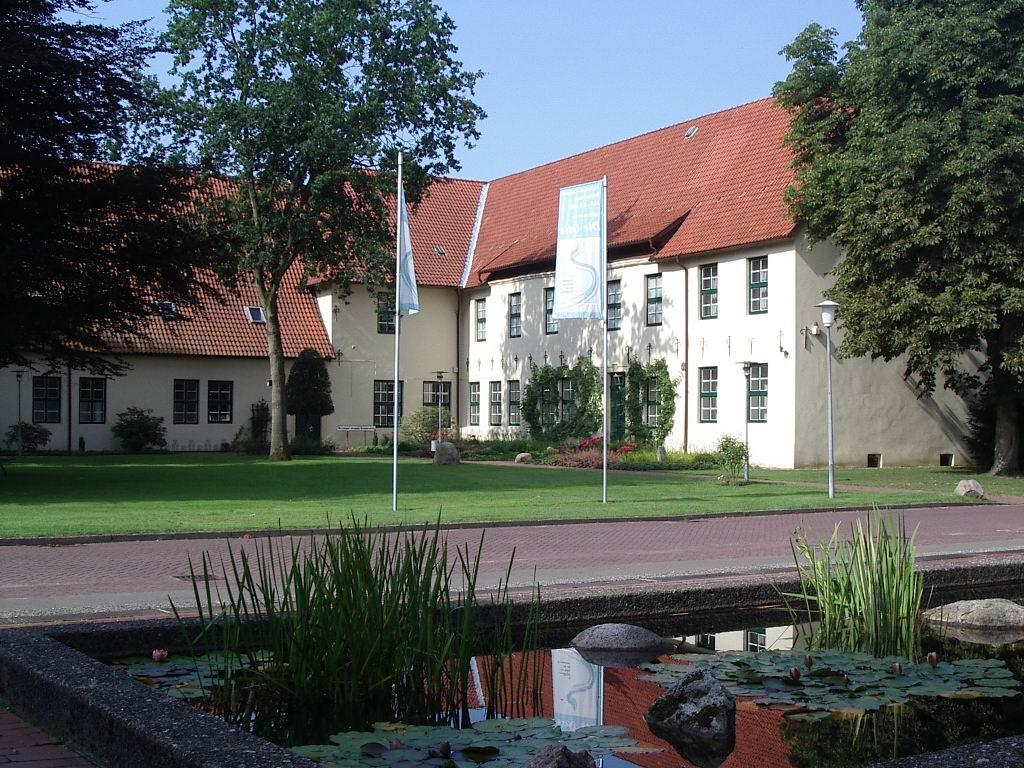
Vorwerk of the former Castle: The Chancery, now housing the Bachmann-Museum for regional archeology, geology and history.

Administrator John Frederick extended the fortified castle by a Vorwerk, including stables and the prince-archiepiscopal Chancery (built in 1608), since 1960 housing a museum, called Bachmann-Museum for regional archeology, geology and history since 1985. The capital function caused the town to be named Bremervörde since the mid-17th century. In 1648 the Prince-Archbishopric was transformed into the Duchy of Bremen, which was first ruled in personal union by the Swedish Crown. The Swedes relocated the capital to Stade.

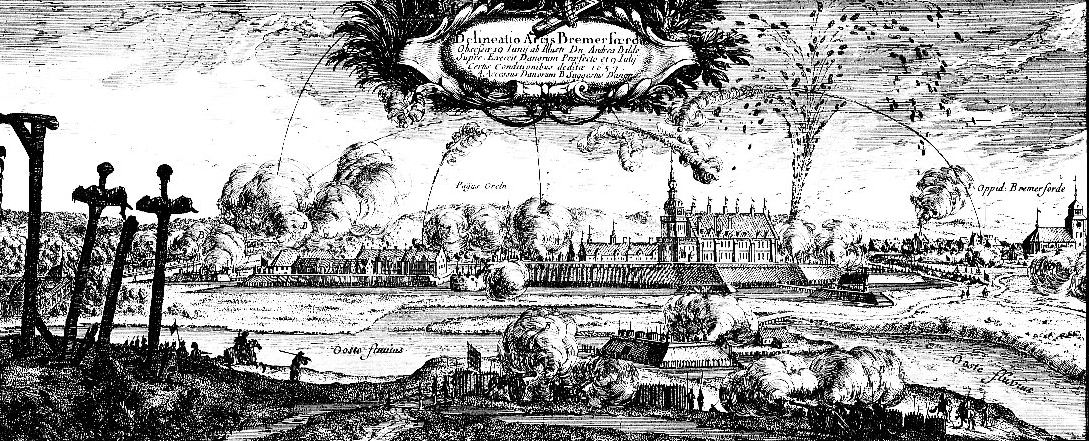
Bremervörde under Danish attack in 1657 during the Dano-Swedish War.

During the Swedish reign the Danish-Norwegian King Frederick III (as of 1648, deposed by the Swedes as Bremian Administrator Frederick II in 1645) invaded the Duchy and bombed his former residence in 1657. In 1682 the damaged castle and the castle church, burial place of many prince-archbishops, were demolished, the rubble bricks moved to Stade for the construction of the Swedish Warehouse (Schwedenspeicher) there. After another Danish occupation between 1712 and 1715 during the Great Northern War the Duchy of Bremen was handed over to the House of Hanover, ruling the area until 1866. In 1823 the Duchy was abolished and its territory became part of the Stade Region.

On May 21, 1945, shortly after the end of the Second World War, the fleeing senior Nazi Heinrich Himmler was captured at an Allied roadblock in Bremervörde.

== Climate ==
Climate data for Bremervörde (1991–2020 normals)
Month	Jan	Feb	Mar	Apr	May	Jun	Jul	Aug	Sep	Oct	Nov	Dec	Year
Mean daily maximum °C (°F)	4.6 (40.3)	5.0 (41.0)	9.0 (48.2)	14.6 (58.3)	18.5 (65.3)	21.2 (70.2)	22.7 (72.9)	22.7 (72.9)	19.6 (67.3)	14.0 (57.2)	8.6 (47.5)	5.4 (41.7)	13.8 (56.8)
Daily mean °C (°F)	2.2 (36.0)	2.4 (36.3)	4.8 (40.6)	9.1 (48.4)	12.9 (55.2)	15.9 (60.6)	17.6 (63.7)	17.2 (63.0)	14.3 (57.7)	10.4 (50.7)	6.1 (43.0)	3.3 (37.9)	9.8 (49.6)
Mean daily minimum °C (°F)	−0.1 (31.8)	−0.8 (30.6)	1.1 (34.0)	3.5 (38.3)	7.0 (44.6)	10.4 (50.7)	12.3 (54.1)	11.9 (53.4)	9.5 (49.1)	6.7 (44.1)	3.3 (37.9)	0.8 (33.4)	5.5 (41.9)
Average precipitation mm (inches)	76.9 (3.03)	51.7 (2.04)	54.8 (2.16)	37.2 (1.46)	49.7 (1.96)	69.8 (2.75)	92.9 (3.66)	75.3 (2.96)	55.2 (2.17)	68.6 (2.70)	63.3 (2.49)	74.7 (2.94)	777.6 (30.61)
Average precipitation days (≥ 0.1 mm)	20.0	15.5	15.9	13.4	14.7	15.0	16.9	17.3	14.4	16.1	18.5	20.7	199.3
Average relative humidity (%)	89.0	85.5	80.5	74.1	73.4	75.8	77.8	79.8	82.2	86.5	89.8	90.6	81.8
Mean monthly sunshine hours	35.6	66.0	115.6	186.5	215.2	199.4	190.4	185.9	152.4	91.4	47.1	32.1	1,512
Source: NOAA

== Tourism ==
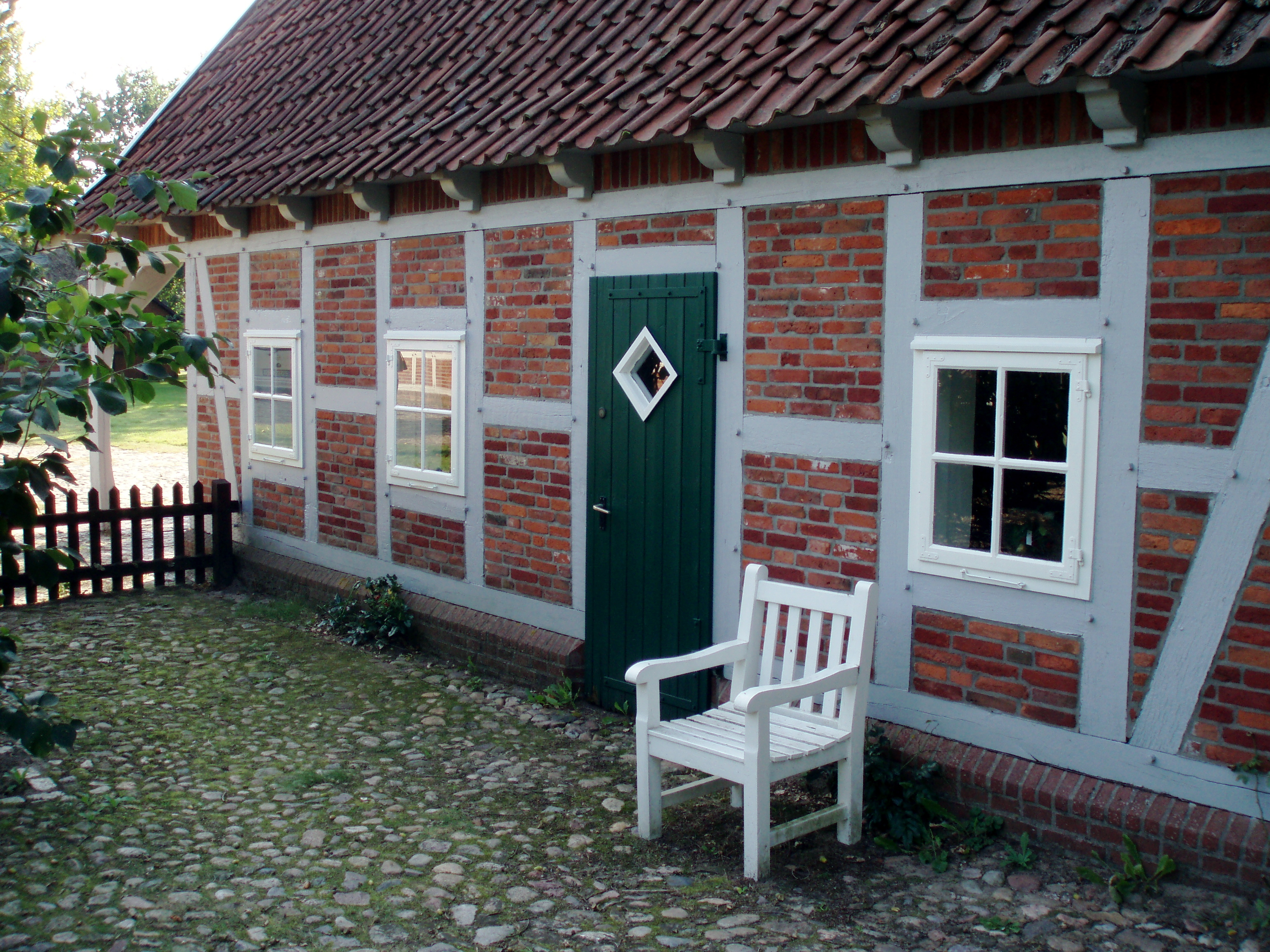
In the garden of the historic Haus am See

Bremervörde is the end point of the "Deutsche Fährstraße" established in May 2004, an institution similar to the American National Scenic Byways. It connects various places between Bremervörde and Kiel with relation to the history of ferries and crossing of rivers, like the historic transporter bridges in Osten and Rendsburg.

== Born in Bremervörde ==
- Georg Alexander Ruperti (1758–1839), German theologian and scholar
- Johan Frederik von Marschalck (1618–1679), Norwegian government official and landowner, the last Chancellor of Norway
- Dietrich Tiedemann (1748–1803), philologist and philosopher, university lecturer
- Martin Greiffenhagen, (DE Wiki) (1928–2004), political scientist, professor at the Stuttgart University
- Rainer Brandt, (DE Wiki) (born 1945), local historian and writer
- Dorothea Brandt (born 1984), swimmer
- Brian Behrendt (born 1991), footballer, played about 300 games

== Connected with Bremervörde ==
- Albert II of Brunswick-Wolfenbüttel (1359–1395), Archbishop of Bremen, died here
- Johann Rode von Wale (1445–1511), Archbishop of Bremen, died here
- Henry of Saxe-Lauenburg (1550–1585), not recognized archbishop and prince-bishop, died here

=== Sport ===
- Bernd Klingner (born 1940), athlete in small calibre shooting, gold medallist at the 1968 Summer Olympics
- Peter Kohnke (1941–1975), athlete in small calibre shooting, died here, gold medallist at the 1960 Summer Olympics
- Klaus Thomforde (born 1962), football coach and former football goalkeeper, played 317 games; born in the district of Minstedt
