= Siegfried I the Elder =

German count (d. 990)

- Count of Walbeck
- Died: 15 March 990
- Noble family: Walbeck
- Spouse: Kunigunde von Stade
- Father: Lothar II the Old, Count of Walbeck
- Mother: Mathilde von Arneburg

Siegfried I the Elder (Siegfried der Ältere von Walbeck) (died 15 March 990), Count of Walbeck and Möckerngau, son of Lothar II the Old, Count of Walbeck, and Mathilde von Arneburg.

== Rule ==
He succeeded his father as Count of Walbeck upon his death. Siegfried is first mentioned as an ally of Odo I, Margrave of the Saxon Ostmark, in his conflict with Mieszko I, Duke of Poland. In particular, Siegfried fought in the Battle of Cedynia (Zehden), as reported in the Chronicon of Siegfried’s son Thietmar of Merseburg. Both Siegfried and Odo escaped the ensuing slaughter. As an interesting sidebar, Mieszko married Oda of Haldensleben, daughter of Dietrich, Margrave of the Nordmark, who was the predecessor of Siegfried’s brother Lothar I as margrave. In 979, he and his brothers were appointed regents of the County of Möckerngau by Emperor Otto II. Siegfried consolidated his position as sole count in 983. Later that year, he fought with the Saxon army against the Great Slav Rising revolt against the empire.

== Death ==
He supported the Empress Theophanu in her war against Boleslaus II in 990, and while moving against the rebellious Lutici, he fell from his horse and died on 15 March 990.

== Marriage and children ==
Siegfried married Kunigunde von Stade, daughter of Henry I the Bald, Count of Stade. Siegfried and Kunigunde had five sons:

- Henry, Count of Walbeck (killed in battle, 1004)
- Friedrick, Count of Walbeck
- Thietmar of Merseburg, Bishop of Merseburg
- Siegfried of Walbeck, Bishop of Münster, 1022–1032
- Bruno of Walbeck, Bishop of Verden, 1034–1049.

Upon his death, Siegfried was succeeded as Count of Walbeck by his son Henry.

== Sources ==
- Warner, David A., Ottonian Germany: The Chronicon of Thietmar of Merseburg, Manchester University Press, Manchester, 2001
- Grosse, Walther, Die Grafen von Walbeck. In: Harz-Zeitschrift, 1952
