= Frederick, Count of Walbeck =

Friedrick (Friedrich von Walbeck; 974–1018), Count of Walbeck and Viscount (Burggraf) of Magdeburg, son of Siegfried I the Older, Count of Walbeck, and Kunigunde von Stade daughter of Henry I the Bald, Count of Stade. He was brother to Thietmar of Merseburg, whose Chronicon was the main source of information on him, and his predecessor Henry, Count of Walbeck.

Frederick was the first recorded Burggraf of Magdeburg. Frederick and his brother Henry accompanied their cousin Werner, Margrave of the Nordmark, and "other excellent warriors" in their abduction of Reinhild, the mistress of Beichlingen, from her fortress at Quedlinburg. Werner was captured by the forces of the abbess, but apparently neither Friedrick nor Henry were charged.

Frederick supported Werner in his quarrel with Dedo I of Wettin, although it is not clear that he participated in his murder. The years before Dedo's death were overshadowed by a feud with the Counts of Walbeck. When his father-in-law Dietrich was deposed as the Margrave of the Nordmark, Dedo claimed the office of margrave for himself. The office was granted instead to Lothair I, Freidrick's uncle. Dedo I was involved in the devastation of the castle of Wolmirstedt which was in the possession of the Counts of Walbeck. Dedo's dispute with the House of Walbeck continued with Lothair's son and successor as margrave Werner. Dedo was killed by Werner on 13 November 1009, along with his vassals, near Mose at the confluence of the Tange and Elbe rivers.

Friedrick married to Thietburga, born of an unknown family. Friedrick and Thietuerga had two children:

- Conrad, Count of Walbeck and Viscount of Magdeburg
- Brigida, Abbess of the Monastery of St. Lawrence at Magdeburg. (Bridida's parentage is described in two ways by Thietmar. She either the daughter of Frederick or that of his uncle Lothar.)

Upon Friedrick's death, his son assumed the titles of Count of Walbeck and Viscount of Magdeburg.
