= Theodoric I (disambiguation) =

Theodoric I was the king of the Visigoths from 453 to 466.

Theodoric I (or Theoderic I, in French Thierry I) may also refer to:

- Theuderic I, Frankish king of Austrasia (511–533/534)
- Theodoric I of Paderborn, bishop (908–916)
- Theodoric I of Wettin (died c. 975)
- Theodoric I, Duke of Upper Lorraine (978–1027)
- Theodoric I, Count of Montbéliard (1073–1105)
- Theodoric I, Margrave of Lusatia (1156–1185)
- Theodoric I, Margrave of Meissen (1198–1221)

== See also ==
- Theodoric, other persons with the name
- Dietrich I (disambiguation), the German form of the name
- Dirk I (disambiguation), the Dutch form of the name
