= Memleben Abbey =

German abbey

Coordinates: 51°17′00″N 11°34′00″E

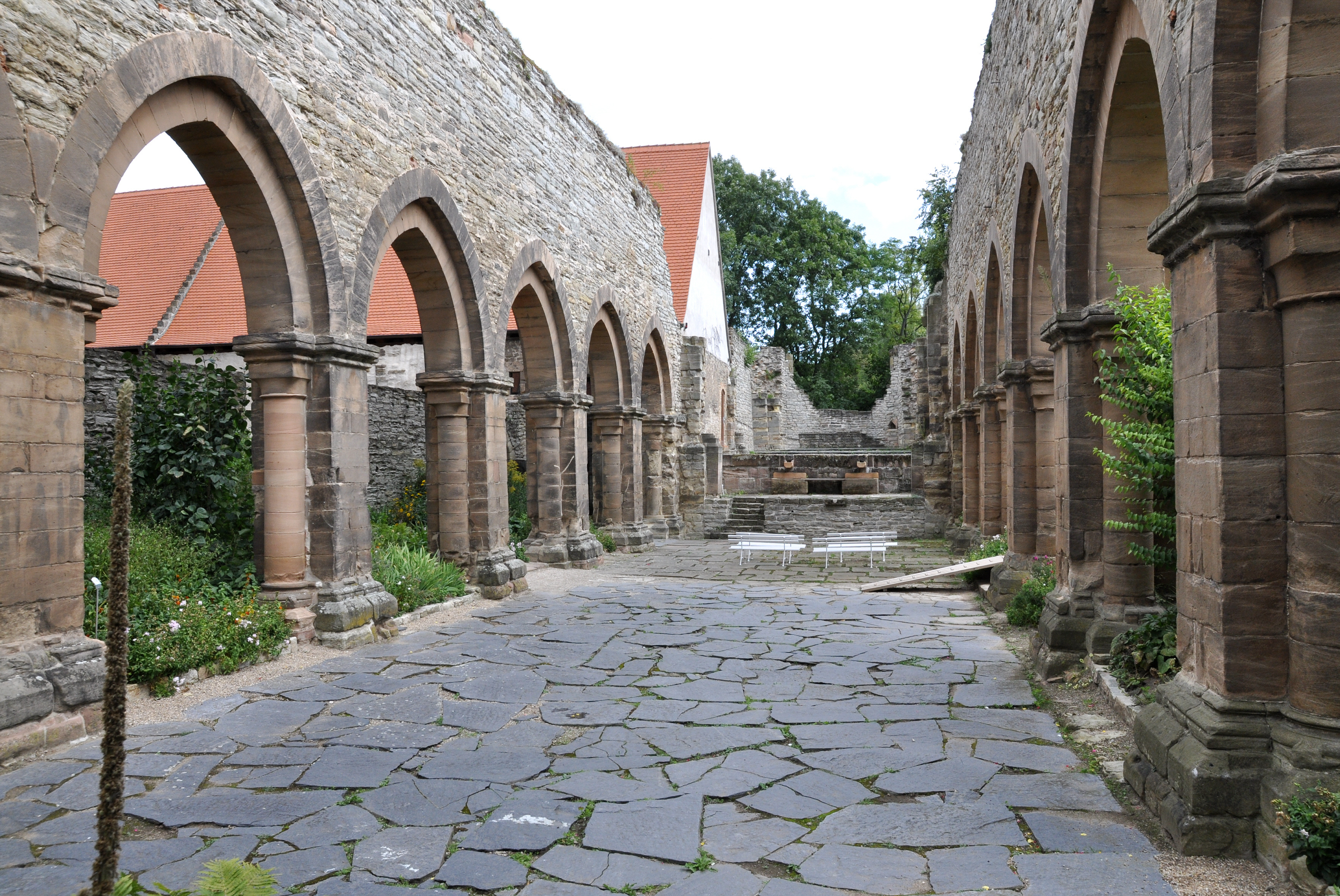
- Ruins of St. Mary's Church
- Interactive map of Memleben Abbey

Monastery information
- Order: Benedictine
- Established: 979
- Disestablished: 1548

Site
- Location: Memleben

Memleben Abbey (German: Kloster Memleben) was a Benedictine monastery in Memleben on the Unstrut river, today part of the Kaiserpfalz municipality in Saxony-Anhalt, Germany. The convent, now ruined, was established by Emperor Otto II and his consort Theophanu about 979.

== History ==
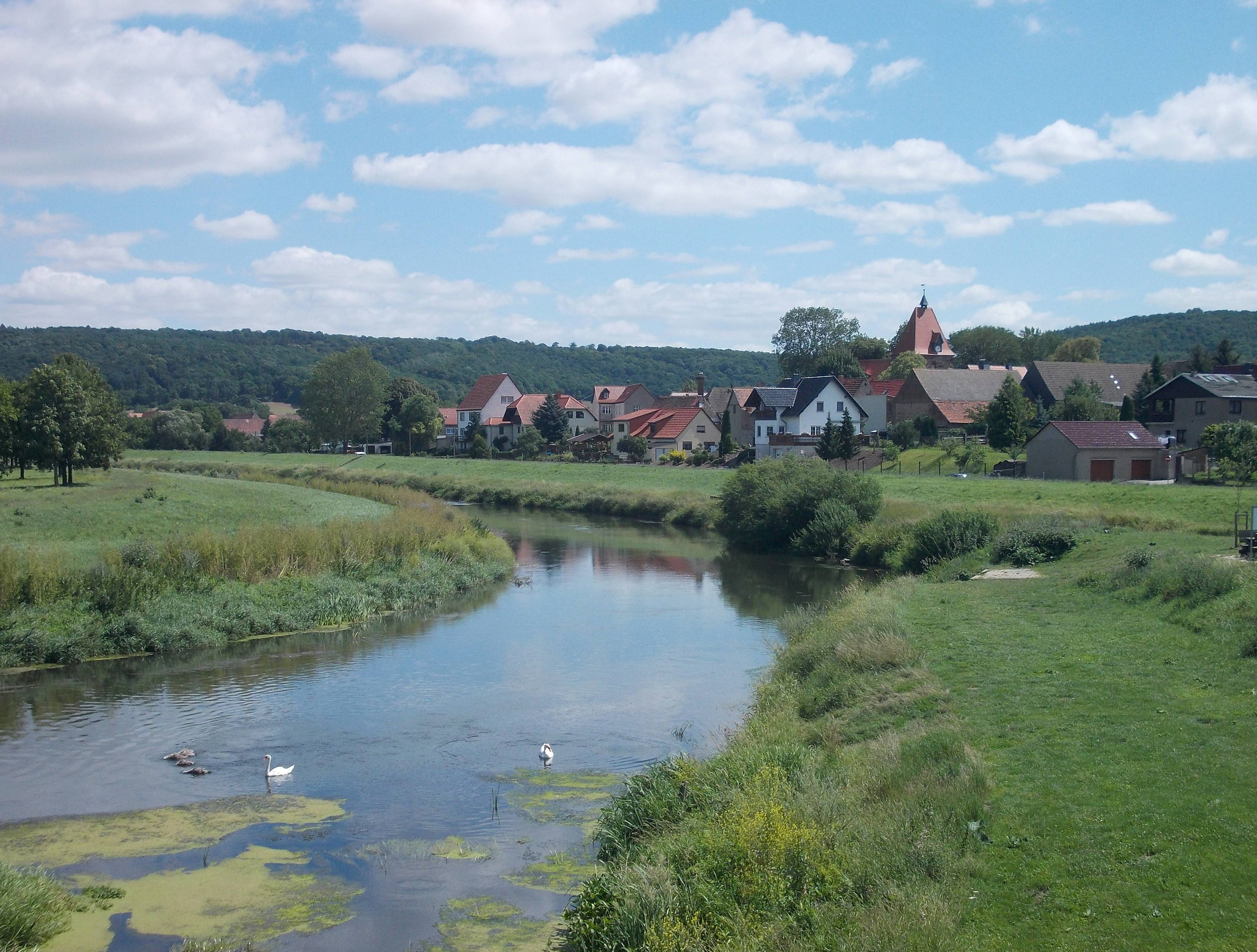
Unstrut riverbank

The settlement of Mimilebo was already mentioned in an urbarium register of Hersfeld Abbey under the rule of Archbishop Lullus of Mainz (died 786). A Hersfeld tithe register, compiled between 881 and 899, again documents the locality of Mimileba in the Saxon shire (Gau) of Friesenfeld, west of the Hassegau.

=== Royal palace ===
Memleben acquired considerable importance under the Saxon dukes of the Ottonian dynasty about 900. Duke Otto the Illustrious (d. 912) served as Hersfeld abbot, his son Henry the Fowler married Hatheburg of Merseburg, a daughter of Count Erwin of Merseburg and heiress of large estates in Hassegau und Friesenfeld. Her brother-in-law, Count Thietmar of Merseburg was one of Henry's tutors. In 909 the couple separated and Hatheburg again took the veil, nevertheless, Henry retained her Eastphalian estates. He spent much time in this area; when he succeeded Conrad I as King of East Francia in 919, he had a royal villa in Memleben. Later greatly enlarged, this Royal Palace (villa regia or Königspfalz) became his favourite residence next only to Quedlinburg.

In 935, while hunting near the royal palace of Bodfeld in the Harz mountains, King Henry seriously fell ill (presumably from a stroke). According to the reports by Bishop Liutprand of Cremona, he assembled the East Frankish princes in Erfurt the next year, to arrange the succession of his son Otto I, and afterwards retired to the castellum of Memleben, where he died after another stroke on 2 July 936. His mortal remains were transferred to the Quedlinburg abbey church.

Otto I, like his father, often stayed in Memleben and issued a number of documents from here. However, no festive ceremonies or diets are documented and parts of the Memleben estates were granted to the newly established Bishops of Zeitz. Crowned Holy Roman Emperor in 962, Otto apparently planned to celebrate the feast of Pentecost at Memleben in 973. The sixty-year-old may have felt his end drawing near when he arrived at his father's place of death. According to the Saxon chronicles by Widukind of Corvey and Thietmar of Merseburg, he died here on 7 May 973 and was buried in Magdeburg Cathedral alongside his first wife Eadgyth. Legend has it, that although his body was buried in Magdeburg, his heart was buried in Memleben.

=== Imperial abbey ===
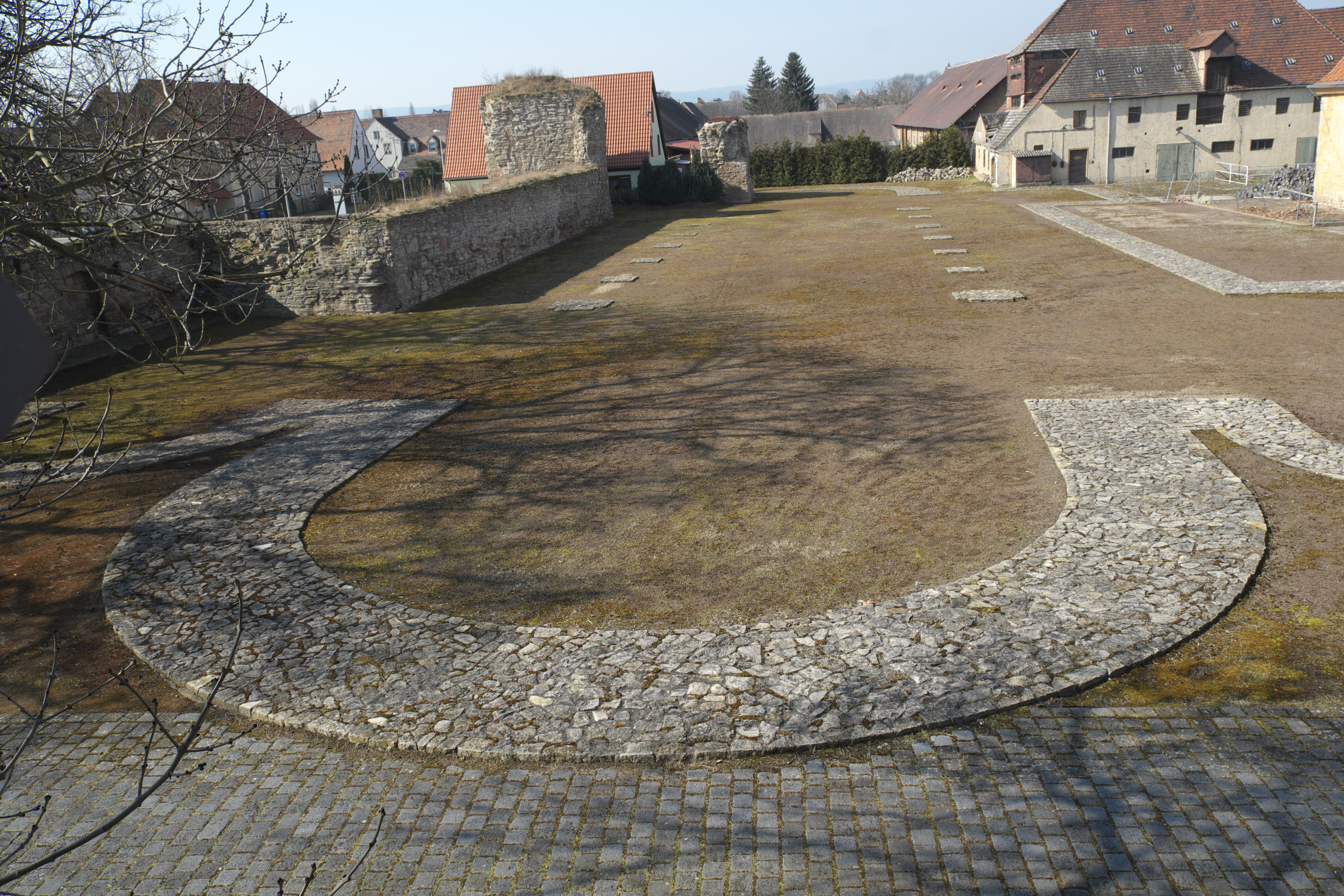
Foundations of the Memleben abbey church

Otto's son and successor, Emperor Otto II, also issued several documents from Memleben. In his father's memory, and perhaps as an intended site of dynastic memorial, his son and successor Otto II with his consort Theophanu founded about 979 a Benedictine monastery near his Kaiserpfalz, which within a short time had become one of the richest and most influential of the Imperial abbeys.

Otto II endowed Memleben with large estates and privileges in present-day Thuringia, Saxony-Anhalt and Hesse, several of them formerly held by Hersfeld Abbey, and also tithe privileges in the Friesenfeld and Hassegau counties. The abbey also received Hevelli lands in the Northern March (present-day Brandenburg), which however were lost in the Great Slav Rising of 983, and further territories in the Saxon Eastern March. After the early death of Otto II, his son, Otto III, stayed at the abbey several times. He granted market, mint and customs rights in the Memleben territory in 994 and donated the Thuringian Wiehe estates to the abbey four years later. He even had plans to make it the centre of a projected See of Thuringia, but died aged 22 in Italy before he was able to act on his intention.

In 1015 the golden age of Memleben Abbey ended. On his accession in 1002, Henry II, the successor of Otto III, initially had confirmed to Abbot Reinhold of Memleben the privileges and possessions of his predecessors, on par with the Imperial abbeys of Fulda, Corvey and Reichenau. However, thirteen years later, he substantially disempowered and dispossessed the Memleben community in favour of Hersfeld Abbey, to whom he subordinated it, in return for estates for his pet project, the newly created Bishopric of Bamberg. The decline of Memleben Abbey, and its Ottonian memoria, was thus ensured.

The Salian emperor Conrad II was the last documented German monarch who stayed at Memleben in 1033. The Memleben convent existed until in 1525 the abbey was plundered during the German Peasants' War and after a steadily worsening decline in the wake of the Protestant Reformation it was finally dissolved in 1548. The abbey's estates were taken over by the Electors of Saxony in 1551 and given to the school at Pforta, which had just been re-founded, and which retained possession of them until the end of World War II.

== Memleben today ==
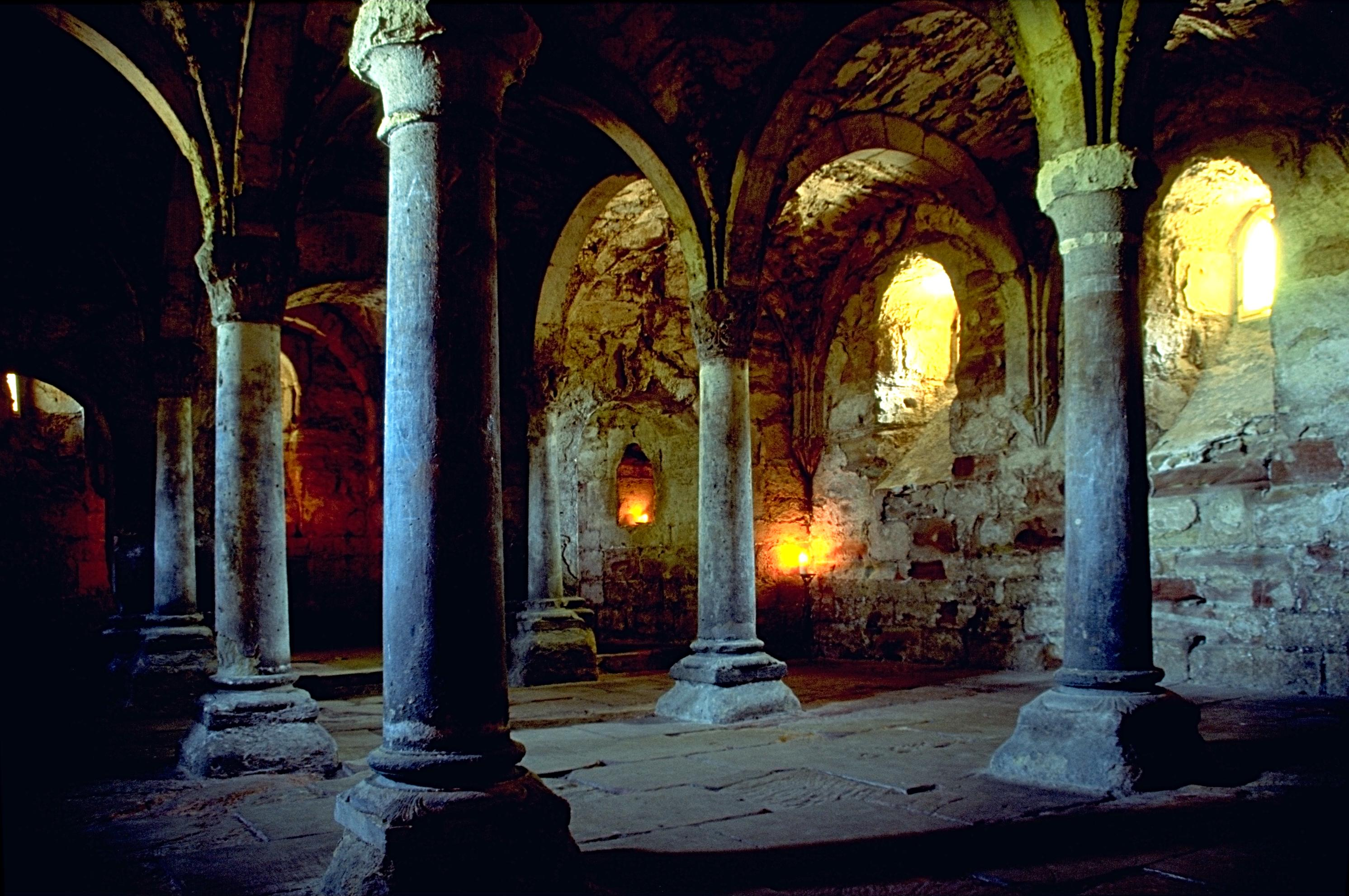
Memleben Crypt

Since the roof of the former abbey church was struck by lightning and destroyed in 1722, several attempts were made later to demolish the rest of the building. Nevertheless, the remaining ruins are still of interest, particularly the Late Romanesque crypt. Of the first monumental church building erected in the 10th century, some walls and foundations are preserved, particularly the southwestern transept and crossing piers, as well as the southern side of the nave.

The former monastic buildings were given during the East German period after World War II to an agricultural collective, who made considerable alterations to them. They now house a museum with a permanent exhibition relating to the royal and monastic history of the abbey and the town, directly perceptible also in an extended monastery garden and a medieval scriptorium. Memleben is a stop on the scenic Romanesque Road. Since 2011, the premises are temporarily attended by Benedictine monks from Münsterschwarzach Abbey.
