= Lothar of Walbeck =

Lothar of Walbeck may refer to:

- Lothar I, Count of Walbeck
- Lothar II the Old, Count of Walbeck
