= Memleben =

- Ortsteil of Kaiserpfalz
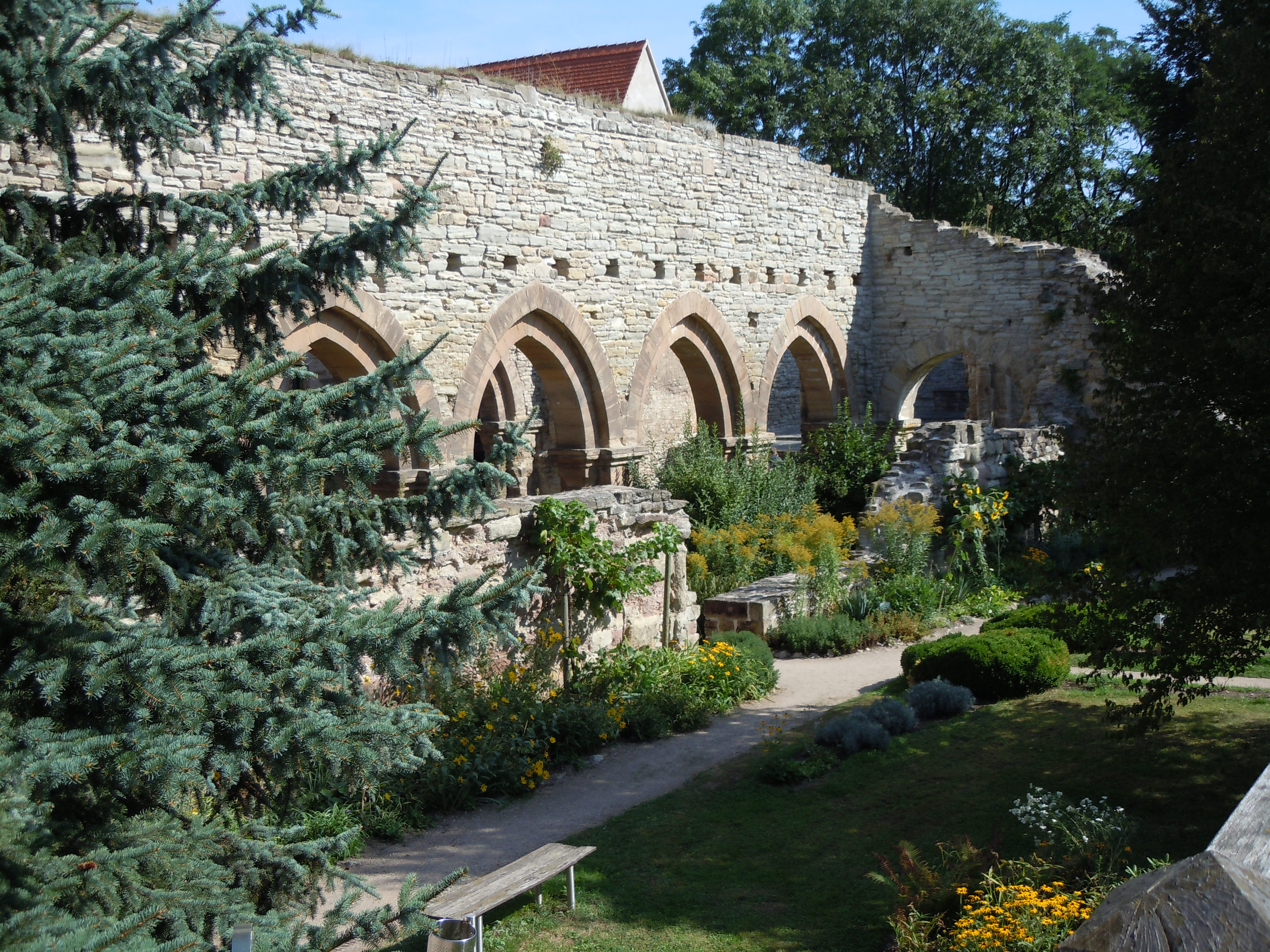
- Memleben Abbey Church ruins
- Interactive map of Memleben
- Location within Germany Location within Saxony-Anhalt
- Coordinates: 51°17′N 11°34′E
- Country: Germany
- State: Saxony-Anhalt
- District: Burgenlandkreis
- Town: Kaiserpfalz

Area
  - Total: 16.76 km^{2} (6.47 sq mi)
- Elevation: 120 m (390 ft)

Population (2006-12-31)
  - Total: 716
  - Density: 42.7/km^{2} (111/sq mi)
- Time zone: UTC+01:00 (CET)
  - Summer (DST): UTC+02:00 (CEST)
- Postal codes: 06642
- Dialling codes: 034672
- Vehicle registration: BLK

Memleben is a village and part of the Kaiserpfalz municipality of the Burgenlandkreis district, in Saxony-Anhalt, Germany. It is known for former Memleben Abbey, the site of a medieval Kaiserpfalz.

== Geography ==
It is located southwest of Nebra on the Unstrut River. The former municipality was merged with the neighbouring villages of Bucha and Wohlmirstedt into Kaiserpfalz on 1 July 2009.

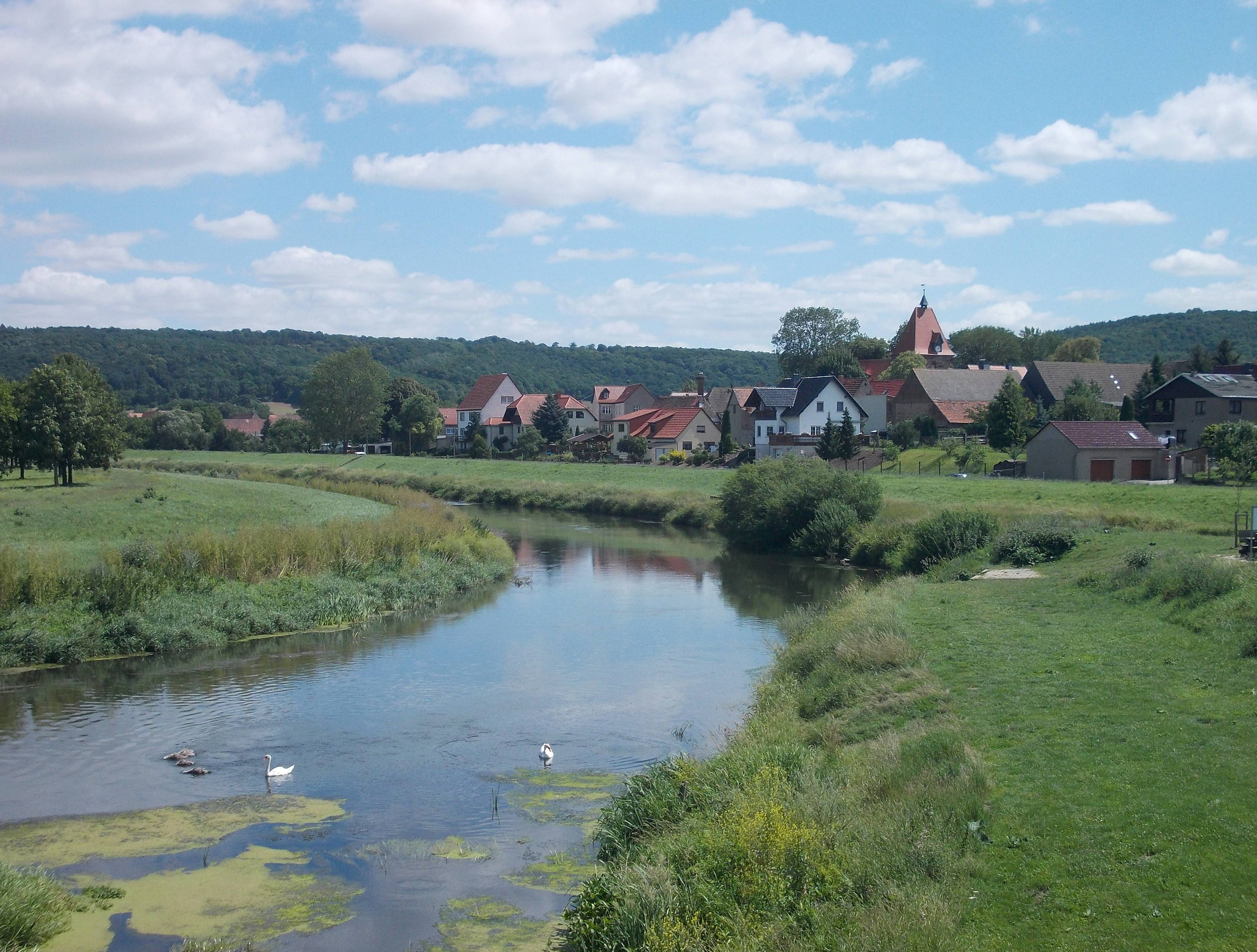
Memleben from the bridge over the river Unstrut

Nowadays the village has about 800 inhabitants. It also has an animal exhibition park with a small circus.

== History ==
A settlement called Mimelebo was already documented in a 780 register of the Hersfeld Abbey estates, issued by Archbishop Lullus of Mainz. In the 10th century the Pfalz or villa regia of Memleben, a kind of seasonal king's court, was one of the favourite places of the German king Henry the Fowler and his son Emperor Otto I. Henry the Fowler died here, probably by stroke, on 2 July 936; his son Emperor Otto I also used Memleben as a temporary residence and died here on 7 May 973. According to the Res gestae saxonicae by the contemporary chronicler Widukind of Corvey, his intestines were buried in a Memleben church.

On behalf of Emperor Otto II, son of Otto I, the Benedictine Memleben monastery was built there from about 979 to honour the memory of his father. The Imperial abbey became one of the most important monasteries in the German kingdom for a short time, until in 1015 Emperor Henry II ceded it back to the monks of Hersfeld Abbey.

The monastery buildings were devastated during the German Peasants' War in 1525. After the Protestant Reformation the abbey was finally dissolved in 1548, its estates were seized by the Electorate of Saxony and ceded to the newly established Pforta state school. Remains of the church and the monastery are still to be seen.

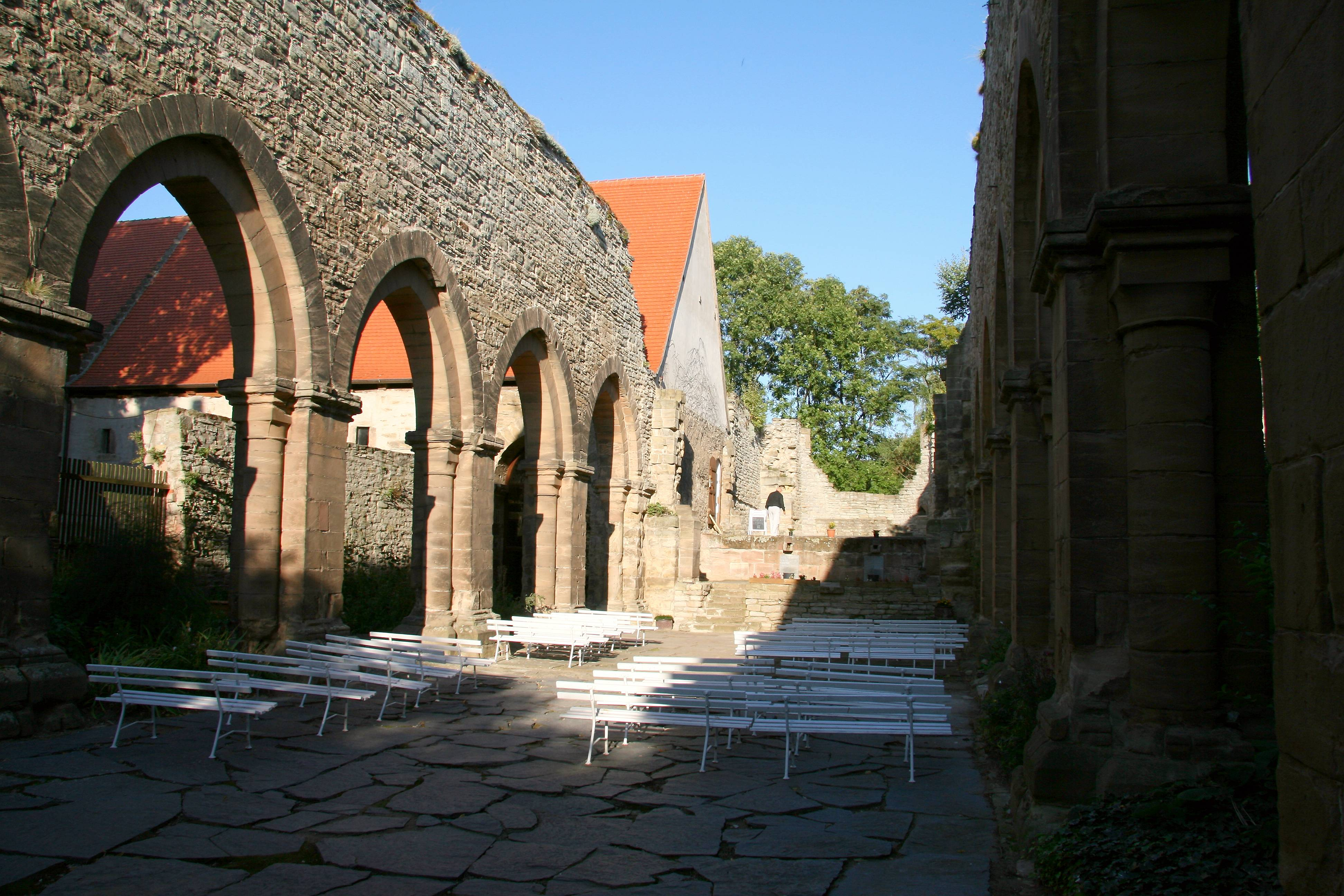
Ruins of the monastery church from the west

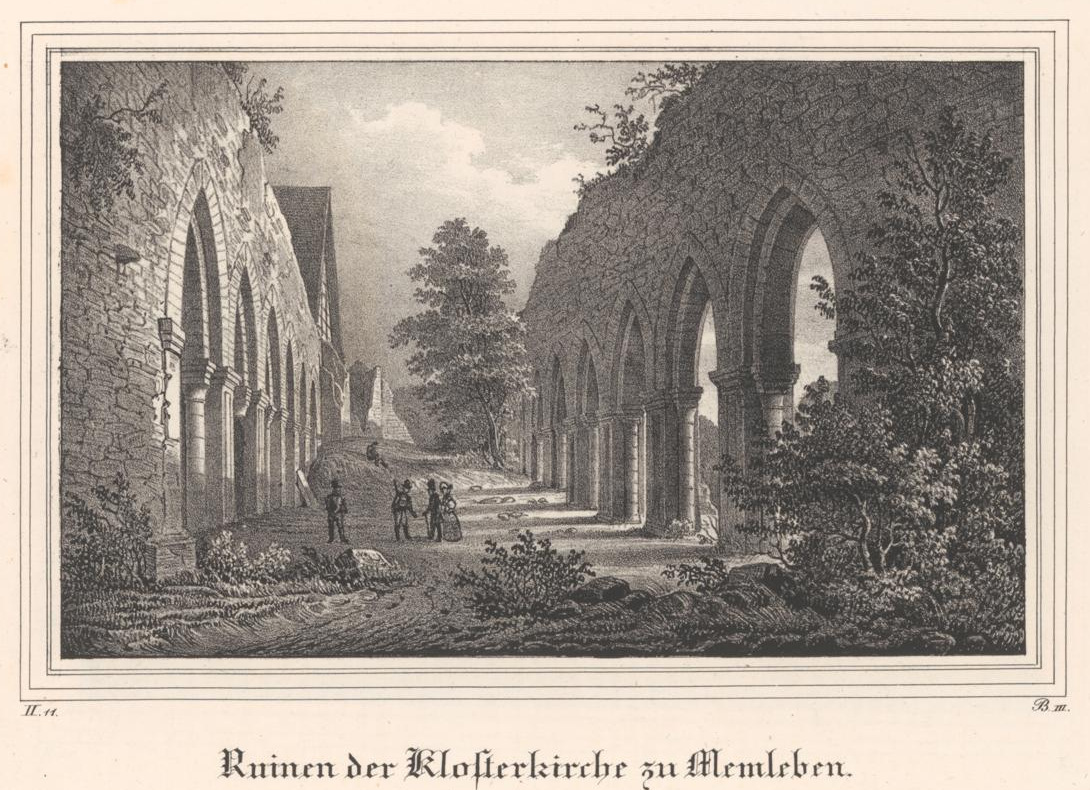
Ruins of the monastery church, 1838

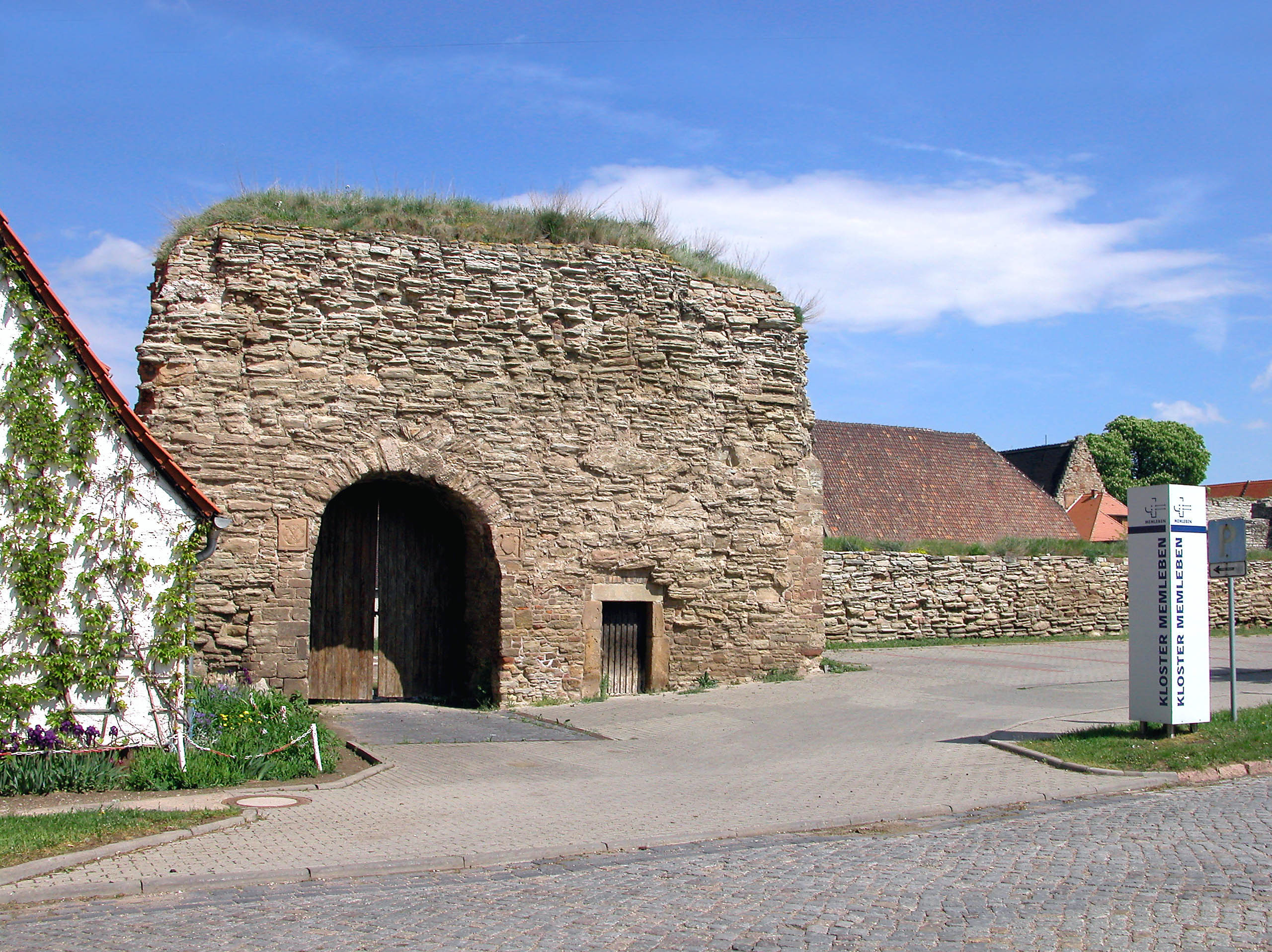
Imperial door of the former Marian Church from the 10th Century

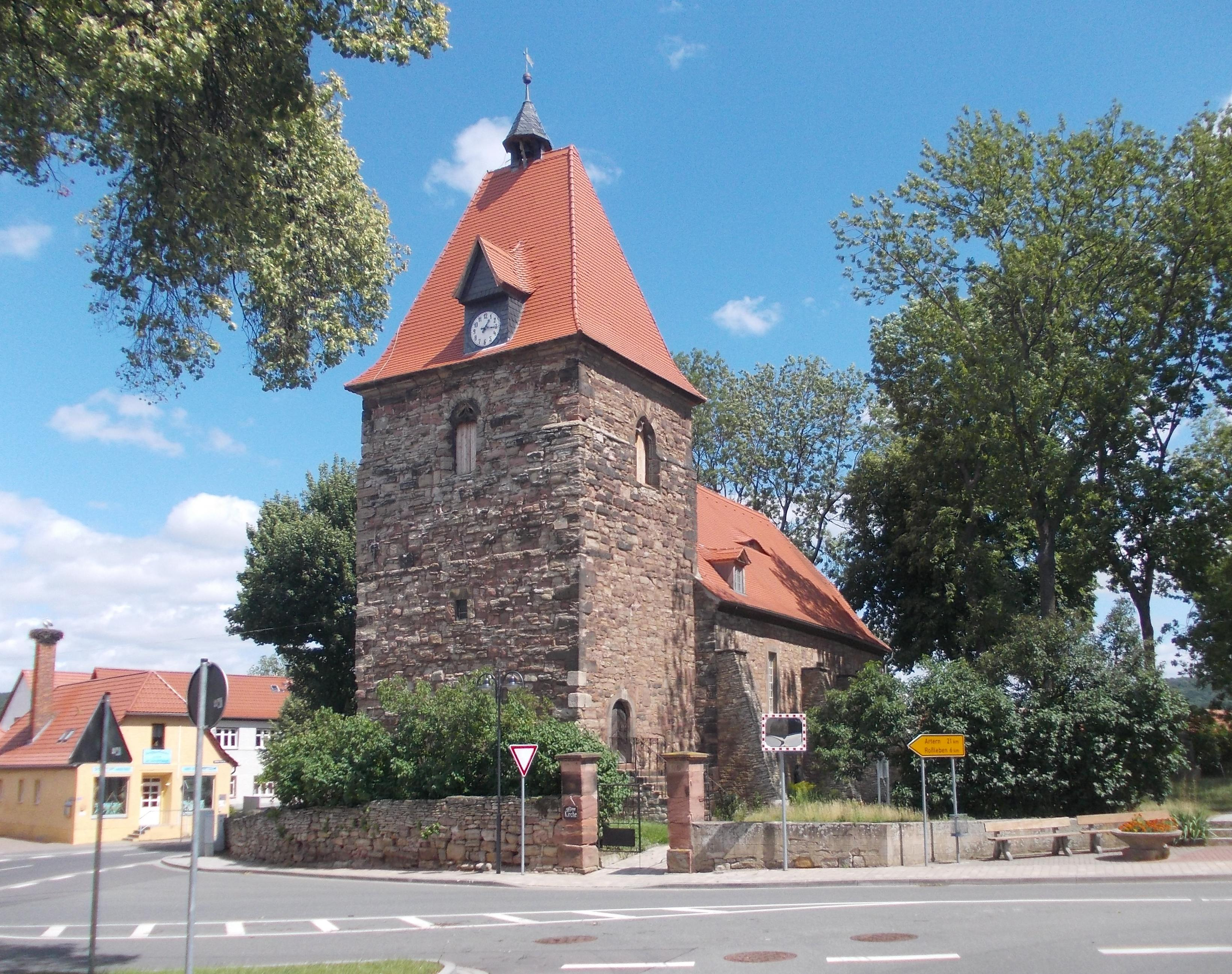
St. Martin's Church in Memleben

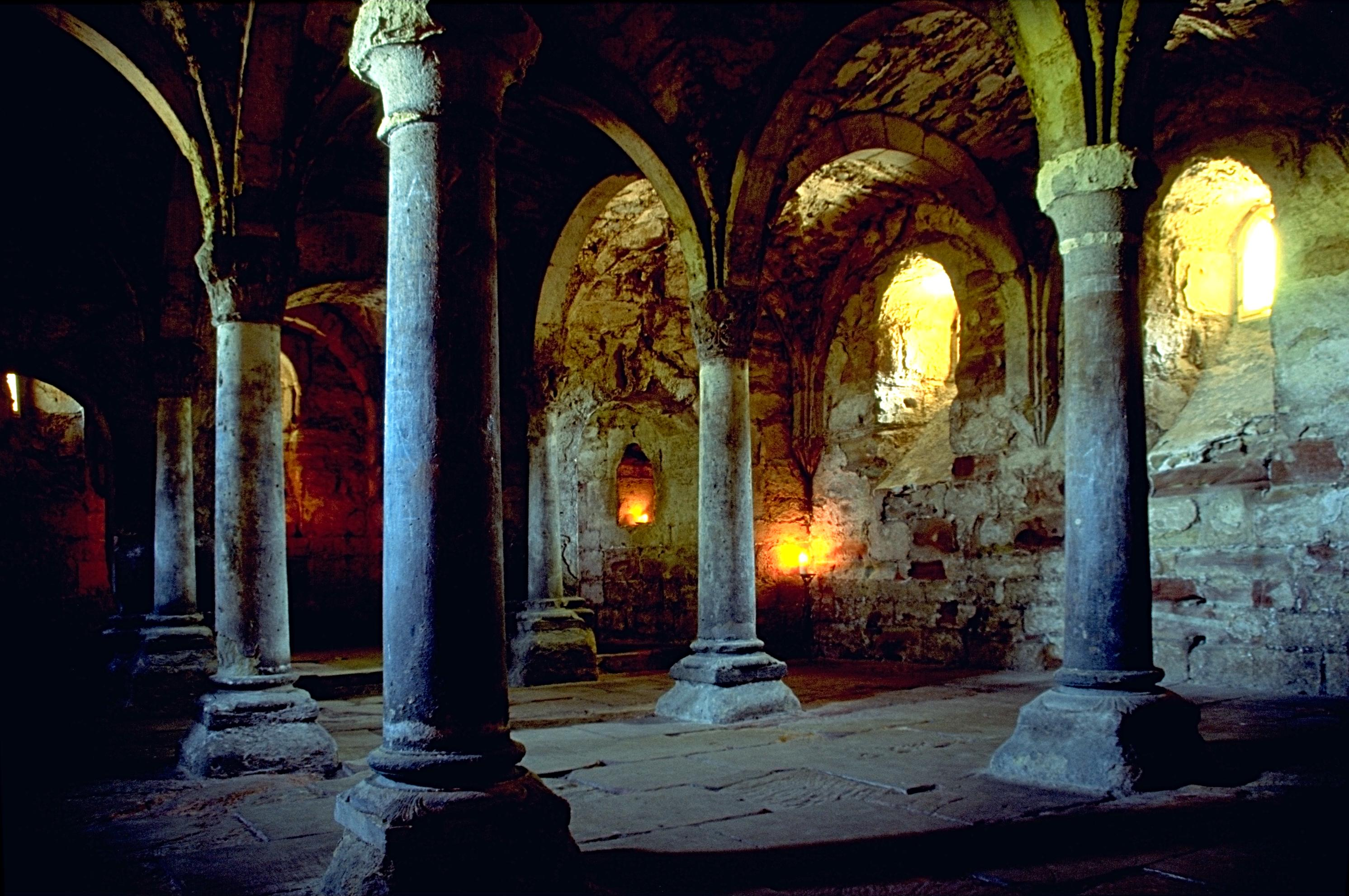
Crypt in Memleben monastery ruins

St. Martin's Church has its origin in the Middle Ages and is currently being renovated.
