= Henry II the Good, Count of Stade =

Henry II the Good
- Born: c. 946
- Died: 1016
- Title: Count of Stade
- Successor: Siegfried II

Henry II the Good (c. 946–1016), Count of Stade, son of Henry I the Bald, Count of Stade, and his wife Judith von der Wetterau, granddaughter of Gebhard, Duke of Lorraine.

Little is known about Henry, other than the writings of Thietmar of Merseburg, who described the deaths of his three maternal uncles Henry, Udo and Siegfried, captured by pirates with Count Adalgar. Thietmar also reports that Henry destroyed the castle at Harsefeld and replaced it with a monastery.

Henry married Mechtild, of an unknown family, and they had two children, only one of which is recorded:

- Siegfried III von Stade (d. 26 October 994)

Henry was succeeded as Count of Stade by his youngest brother Siegfried II upon his death. Henry's other brother Lothair Udo I is also identified in some sources as a Count of Stade and, if so, then the two brothers shared the countship for a period of time.

== Sources ==
- Warner, David, ed. (2001). Ottonian Germany: The Chronicon of Thietmar of Merseburg. Manchester University Press.
- Hucke, Richard G., Die Grafen von Stade 900-1144. Genealogie, politische Stellung, Comitat und Allodialbesitz der sächsischen Udonen; Diss. Kiel, Stade mit umfassenden Nachweisen der Quellen und älteren Literatur, 1956
