= Gero, Count of Alsleben =

Gero (died 11 August 979) was a Count of Alsleben, conjectured to be the son of Siegfried and therefore grandson of Gero the Great. If so, his mother was Hedwig, daughter of Wichmann the Elder. Gero was the brother of Tetta, who established a monastery at Alsleben in his name. Thietmar of Merseburg refers to Gero as a Count in Northern Thuringia and Morzani. Gero was married to Adela of an unknown family. Gero and Adela had one daughter, Adela of Alsleben, who married Siegfried II, Count of Stade. No other counts of Alsleben are recorded until the 12th century.

Waldo, a Saxon warrior, appeared before Emperor Otto II, accusing Gero of a crime, the details of which are unknown. At the instigation of Adalbert, Archbishop of Magdeburg, and Dietrich, Margrave of the Northern March, Gero was captured at Sömmering and placed in the custody of Thietmar's father and uncle, Siegfried I, Count of Walbeck, and Lothair I, Margrave of the Nordmark.

In accordance with the practice of trial by combat, Gero and Waldo met for a judicial duel on 11 August 979. During the fight, Gero's strikes resulted in two serious blows to the neck of Waldo, but Waldo was able to counter with a heavy blow to Gero's head. With his opponent too dizzy to continue, Waldo left the site and disarmed, only to suddenly die of his wounds.

Despite clearly winning the combat, Gero was declared guilty and sentenced to death. On the emperor's orders, Gero was beheaded at sunset. Apparently, the only ones pleased with the verdict were Adalbert and Dietrich. Otto I, Duke of Swabia and Bavaria, who arrived later in the day, and Berthold, Count of the Radenzgau, rebuked the emperor, Otto II, for allowing such a man to be condemned on a petty charge. The remarkable outcome of this duel was long remembered in medieval Germany.

== Sources ==
- Warner, David A. Ottonian Germany: The Chronicon of Thietmar of Merseburg. Manchester University Press, Manchester: 2001.
