= Frederick I of Wettin =

Frederick I, Count of Eilenburg (born c. 960; died 5 Jan 1017 in Eilenburg) was a son of Count Dietrich I and the brother of Dedo I of Wettin.

Together with his brother Dedo, he administered the Burgward of Zörbig, which had already been transferred to them before 1009. In the years 973 to 978 Frederick may have been the bailiff of Magdeburg Cathedral. In addition, Emperor Henry II entrusted him temporarily with the supervision of the castle in Meissen in the years 1009 and 1015. In 1012, Frederick stayed near the residence of the Archbishop of Magdeburg, Walthard.

Among the territories that he ruled over, besides the allod, the "civitas" of Eilenburg, in the west the former March of Lusatia, as well as count's estates in the Gau of Quezizi near Eilenburg. When Frederick died in January 1017, he left all allodial property to his three daughters and transferred Eilenburg to his nephew Dietrich I, since he himself had no male offspring.

== Literature ==
- Stefan Pätzold: Die frühen Wettiner. Adelsfamilie und Hausüberlieferung (Geschichte und Politik in Sachsen; 6). Böhlau, Cologne, 1997, ISBN 3-412-08697-5.
