= Siegfried I =

Siegfried I may refer to:

- Siegfried I the Elder, Count of Walbeck (d. 990)
- Siegfried of Luxembourg (922–998), first count of Luxembourg
- Siegfried I, Count of Sponheim (c. 1010 – 1065)
- Siegfried I (Archbishop of Mainz) (d. 1084)
- Siegfried I, Prince of Anhalt-Zerbst (c. 1230 – 1298)
