= Dedo I =

Dedo I may refer to:

- Dedo I of Wettin (c. 950 – 1009)
- Dedi I, Margrave of the Saxon Ostmark (1004–1075)
