= Lothar II of Stade =

German aristocrat, Count of Stade

Lothar II (874-929), Count of Stade, son of Lothar I, Count of Stade, and Oda of Saxony, daughter of Liudolf, Duke of Saxony. Lothar was the great-grandfather of Thietmar of Merseburg, and is frequently confused in genealogical sources with Thietmar’s other great-grandfather of the same name who was Count of Walbeck.

Lothar died fighting the Slavs in the Battle of Lenzen, as did Lothar I, Count of Walbeck. Thietmar describes his great-grandfathers (called Liuthar in his Chronicon), as “distinguished men, the best of warriors, of illustrious lineage, and the honour and solace of the homeland.”

Lothar married Swanhild of Saxony and had four children:

- Henry I the Bald, Count of Stade
- Gerburg von Stade
- Siegfried I, Count of Stade

Upon his death, Lothar was succeeded as Count of Stade by Wichmann I the Elder.

== Sources ==
Warner, David A., Ottonian Germany: The Chronicon of Thietmar of Merseburg, Manchester University Press, Manchester, 2001

Leyser, Karl, Medieval Germany and Its Neighbours 900-1250, The Hambledon Press, London, 1982

Bury, J. B. (editor), The Cambridge Medieval History: Volume III, Germany and the Western Empire, Cambridge University Press, 1922
