= Siegfried I of Stade =

Siegfried I (b. before 929, d. after 961), Count of Stade, son of Lothar II, Count of Stade, and Swanhild of Saxony, brother of Henry I the Bald, Count of Stade.

After the death of their father, Lothar, in the Battle of Lenzen, Stade was ruled by Wichmann I the Elder and his sons, who controlled a relatively large cavalry force (several hundred horses) on the left bank of the Elbe. By 955, the sons of Wichmann, Wichmann II the Younger and Egbert the One-Eyed, had rebelled against Otto I, then King of Germany, and the countship of Stade reverted to the family of Lothar.

Siegfried and his brother built the castle at Harsefeld which was converted to religious uses for the Archdiocese of Bremen under the rule of Henry's son and then to a Benedictine archabbey in 1104.

The only reference to Siegfried as a count is in a charter of Otto dated 23 April 961, and it is possible that Siegfried and his brother were co-rulers at that time. It is not known whether Siegfried was married or had any children. The next known Count of Stade was Henry's son Henry II the Good, who ruled the county until his death in 1016.

== Sources ==
- Warner, David A., Ottonian Germany: The Chronicon of Thietmar of Merseburg, Manchester University Press, Manchester, 2001
- Reuter, Timothy, Germany in the Early Middle Ages, 800-1036, London and New York, 1992
- Bury, J. B. (editor), The Cambridge Medieval History: Volume III, Germany and the Western Empire, Cambridge University Press, 1922
