= Werner, Margrave of the Nordmark =

Margeave of Nordmark

Werner
- Margrave of the Nordmark
- Tenure: 1003 – 1009
- Died: 11 November 1014; Allerstedt, Duchy of Saxony
- Spouse(s): Liutgard of Meissen (m. 1003; died 1012)
- Father: Lothair I, Margrave of the Nordmark
- Mother: Godila of Rothenburg

Werner (also Wirinher or Werinharius) (died 11 November 1014) was the Margrave of the Nordmark from 1003 until 1009. He was a cousin of the contemporary bishop and historian Thietmar of Merseburg.

Werner was the eldest son of Lothair I, Margrave of the Nordmark, and his wife Godila of Rothenburg, a Franconian. He was born when his mother was only thirteen years old. Werner abducted Liutgard, the eldest child of Eckard I of Meissen, from the castle of Quedlinburg and, in January 1003, married her. That same year, Werner succeeded his father in the Nordmark, but was removed from office and deprived of his titles in 1009 following accusations brought forth by Dedo I, Count of Wettin. He was replaced as margrave by his rival, Bernard of Haldensleben. In 1013, Werner and Eckard II, his brother-in-law, were considered by the Emperor Henry II to be too closely allied with Boleslaus I of Poland.

Werner's wife predeceased him on 13 November 1012. Werner, accompanied by his cousins Henry and Frederick, abducted Reinhild, the "mistress of Beichlingen," in November 1014. He was captured, but before he could be put on trial, was murdered at Allerstedt on 11 November 1014, "having patiently endured whatever misfortunes had hitherto come his way", according to Thietmar. He was buried beside his wife in the familial monastery of Walbeck. He left no children.

== Notes ==
=== Sources ===
- Reuter, Timothy (1991). Germany in the Early Middle Ages 800–1056. New York: Longman.
