= Henry, Count of Walbeck =

Henry (died September 1004), Count of Walbeck, son of Siegfried I the Older, Count of Walbeck, and Kunigunde von Stade, daughter of Henry I the Bald, Count of Stade. Virtually all that is known about Henry was provided in the chronicle of his brother Thietmar of Merseburg.

Henry and his brother Frederick accompanied their cousin Werner, Margrave of the Nordmark, and "other excellent warriors" in their abduction of Liudgerdam from her fortress at Quedlinburg. Werner was captured by the forces of the abbess, but apparently Henry and Fredrick were not charged.

In 1004, Henry participated in an invasion of the "lands of the Milzeni" [it is not clear as to the identity of this tribe], in support of Jaromír, Duke of Bohemia. Henry was vassal to Hemuzo, "a warrior noble in lineage and vigorous in manner" who was killed when half a millstone struck his helmeted head. According to Thietmar, "the jeering enemy dragged his corpse into the burg." Henry ransomed his body and returned it to his homeland. There are no other historical references to Hemuzo

Henry was charged with carrying out the sentence of his cousin Werner for his actions, but Werner was murdered before justice could be served.

It is not recorded whether or not Henry married, nor is there any evidence on an heir. Upon his death, Henry was succeeded as Count of Walbeck by his brother Frederick.

== Sources ==
- Warner, David A., Ottonian Germany: The Chronicon of Thietmar of Merseburg, Manchester University Press, Manchester, 2001
- Grosse, Walther, Die Grafen von Walbeck. In: Harz-Zeitschrift, 1952
