= Wolf-Heinrich Graf von Helldorff =

German police official and politician (1896–1944)

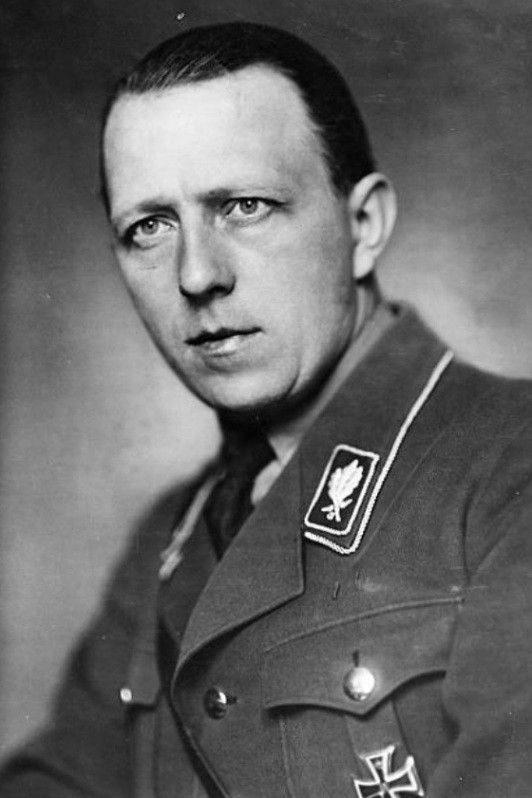
- Wolf-Heinrich Graf von Helldorff

Berlin Police Chief
- In office 19 July 1935 – 24 July 1944
- Preceded by: Magnus von Levetzow
- Succeeded by: Kurt Göhrum

Potsdam Police President
- In office 25 March 1933 – 18 July 1935
- Succeeded by: Wilhelm Ernst Graf von Wedel

Member of the Reichstag
- In office 12 November 1933 – 10 August 1944

Personal details
- Born: 14 October 1896 Merseburg, Province of Saxony, Prussia, German Empire
- Died: 15 August 1944 (aged 47) Plötzensee Prison, Berlin, Nazi Germany
- Cause of death: Execution by hanging
- Party: NSFB (1924–1925); NSDAP (1925–1944)

Military service
- Allegiance: German Empire
- Branch/service: Imperial German Army
- Years of service: 1914–1919
- Rank: Leutnant
- Unit: Hussar Regiment 12
- Battles/wars: World War I
- Awards: Iron Cross, first and second class

Wolf-Heinrich Julius Otto Bernhard Fritz Hermann Ferdinand Graf von Helldorff (14 October 1896 – 15 August 1944) was an SA-Obergruppenführer, German police official and politician. He served as a member of the Landtag of Prussia during the Weimar Republic, as a member of the Reichstag for the Nazi Party from 1933, and as Ordnungspolizei Police President in Potsdam and in Berlin. From 1938 he became involved with the anti-Nazi resistance, and was executed in 1944 for his role in the 20 July plot to overthrow Adolf Hitler's regime.

== Early life ==
Wolf-Heinrich Julius Otto Bernhard Fritz Hermann Ferdinand Graf von Helldorff was born in Merseburg on 14 October 1896. A noble landowner's son, Helldorff was educated by private tutors in his youth, and then graduated from the gymnasium in Wernigerode in 1914. He volunteered for military service with the 12th Thuringian Hussars headquartered in Torgau. He served on both the western front and the eastern front in the First World War, attaining the rank of Leutnant and earning the Iron Cross first and second class. After the war, he was a member of the right-wing Freikorps, seeing service with both the Freikorps Lutzow and Freikorps Roßbach in 1919 and 1920. From 1920 to 1924 he was a member of the nationalist paramilitary organisation Stahlhelm.

He became a member of the National Socialist Freedom Movement (NSFB) in 1924, which served as a legal front for the National Socialist German Workers' Party (NSDAP), which had been banned after the Beer Hall Putsch, and he also joined its paramilitary force, the Frontbann. He was elected to the Landtag of Prussia in 1924 on the NSFB list, representing constituency 11 (Regierungsbezirk Merseburg) until 1928.

== Nazi career ==
Helldorf formally joined the Nazi Party on 1 August 1930 (membership number 325,408) and in January 1931 he joined the Sturmabteilung (SA). By July he became the leader of SA-Gruppe Greater Berlin with the rank of SA-Oberführer. Later that year, he was made Gruppe leader for all of Brandenburg. His authority expanded to include the Schutzstaffel (SS) in Brandenburg. On 12 September 1931 (Jewish new year, Rosh Hashanah), von Helldorff organized a riot at Kurfürstendamm, where about a thousand men appeared from within the crowd on the streets and started attacking people who they thought were Jewish, beating them and screaming anti-Jewish threats at them. Helldorff and his Chief-of-Staff Karl Ernst were arrested and tried but their subsequent acquittal with just a small fine turned Helldorff into a Nazi cause-celebre. At their trial Helldorff and Ernst were defended by Nazi lawyers Hans Frank and Roland Freisler.

In April 1932 Helldorff was returned to the Prussian Landtag as a member of the Nazi Party, this time representing constituency 3 (Potsdam II). In September 1932 he was promoted to SA-Gruppenführer and made leader of SA-Obergruppe I, commanding multiple SA Gruppe covering all northeast Germany.

After the Nazi seizure of power, Helldorff was made Police President of Potsdam on 25 March 1933. In November 1933, he was also elected to the Reichstag on the Nazi electoral list. He was reelected in 1936 and, in 1938, as a deputy for electoral constituency 2 (Berlin-West), retaining this seat until removed in August 1944. He remained at the head of the Potsdam police until being named Police President of Berlin on 19 July 1935. In December 1935, he was made a member of the Prussian Provincial Council (Provinzialrat). As chief of the Berlin Police, he was gifted a magnificent lakeside villa at Argentische Allee 28 in the fashionable suburb of Zehlendorf (Berlin) where he lived with his family from 1938.

Helldorff was closely allied with Joseph Goebbels, Gauleiter of Berlin and Reich Minister of Public Enlightenment and Propaganda. While in this post, Helldorff played an instrumental role in the harassment and plundering of Berlin's Jewish population in the early and the mid-1930s. In his diary entry of 19 June 1936, Goebbels commented: "Helldorff is now proceeding radically on the Jewish question ... many arrests ... We will free Berlin of Jews." Goebbels noted on 2 July 1938, that "Helldorff wants to construct a Jewish ghetto in Berlin. The rich Jews will be required to fund its construction." Helldorff was the organizational brains behind the arson and looting of Berlin's synagogues and Jewish businesses in Kristallnacht 1938. On 8 November 1938, the day that Kristallnacht began, he was quoted in The New York Times that: "as a result of a police activity in the last few weeks the entire Jewish population of Berlin had been disarmed." On 9 November 1938, Helldorff was promoted to SA-Obergruppenführer. Though never officially a member of the SS, owing to his position as a Police President, he was authorized to wear the uniform of a General der Polizei, a rank equivalent to an Obergruppenführer in the SS. Helldorff was additionally named as the Higher Police Leader of Greater Berlin in 1943. In this position, he commanded police who guarded deportation trains carrying German Jews.

== 20 July plot ==
It is asserted that Helldorff was in some form of communication with the military opposition to Hitler as early as 1938. Goebbels certainly ensured that Helldorf took the blame for the November pogroms by declaring "the police act with an appearance of legality, the party provides spectators". The police took orders not to arrest or to treat too harshly rioters who beat up Jews.

Helldorff collaborated closely with his subordinate the Kripo head Arthur Nebe, and was supposed to direct all police forces in Berlin to stand down and not interfere in the military actions to seize the government. However, his half-hearted actions on 20 July had minimal influence on the events.

In contrast, Hans Gisevius's book To the Bitter End described Helldorff as playing an important role in a circle of conspirators and anti-Nazis. On 20 July 1944, he was in communication with the coup d'état plotters attempting to assassinate Hitler. His planned role would be to keep the police from interfering with the military takeover and then to aid the new government.

== Trial and execution ==
For his involvement in the 20 July plot to assassinate Hitler at the Wolf's Lair in East Prussia, Helldorff was arrested on 24 July and, under interrogation by the Gestapo, confessed his role in the plot. Expelled from the Party on 8 August and from the Reichstag two days later, he was put on trial and condemned by Roland Freisler at the People's Court on 15 August. He was by far the most senior Nazi Party member to be convicted of involvement in the plot.

He was put to death at Plötzensee Prison that same day. So enraged was Hitler at Helldorff's participation in the plot that he insisted Helldorff be forced to watch his fellow conspirators being hanged before his own execution.

== Personal indebtedness ==
Helldorff was friends with the stage magician and psychic Erik Jan Hanussen, who constantly lent him money for his debts.

The count was always in debt, and his private life was a wreck. He was separated from his wife and was on bad terms with his mother after welching on his promise to pay her rent. Sometimes he was behind in his own rent. On one occasion he 'forgot' to pay for a new Mercedes. And he was always late paying his personal tailor and the trainer he hired for his racehorse. There were other debts as well, all from a gambling habit Helldorff couldn't shake. Luckily, he could always count on a handout from Hanussen. All he had to do was sign an IOU, which Hanussen would add to his growing pile of chits he kept safe in his apartment.

== Career summary ==
- 2 August 1914 – Spring 1918: Service on Western and Eastern Fronts
- 1919: Service with Freikorps Lützow, involved in fighting against communist uprisings in Brunswick, Jena and Munich
- 1919–1920: Leader of Offiziers-Stoßtrupp in Freikorps Roßbach, which participated in the Kapp Putsch of 13 March 1920
- 1919–1924: Member of Der Stahlhelm
- August 1924: Joined the Frontbann
- 7 December 1924 – 3 March 1928: Member of the Landtag of Prussia.
- 1 May 1925 – 22 September 1925: Commander of the Frontbann
- 1 August 1930: Joined the NSDAP, member number 325,408
- January 1931: Joined the Sturmabteilung (SA)
- 24 April 1932 – 14 October 1933: Member of the Landtag of Prussia.
- 25 March 1933 – 18 July 1935: Police President in Potsdam
- 2 November 1933 – 10 August 1944: Member of the Reichstag
- 19 July 1935 – 24 July 1944: Police President in Berlin

== Family ==
Helldorff married Ingeborg Ellinor von Wedel (* 10. November 1894 in Darmstadt; † 8. April 1971 in Munster) on 11 October 1920 in Rothenburg ob der Tauber. They had 5 children together:

- Wolf-Ingo Ferdinand Julius Heinrich Benno (* 23 October 1921 in Leipzig; † 22 February 1991)
- Joachim Ferdinand Hans Heinrich Wedego (* 6 March 1923 in Wohlmirstedt; † 14 June 1997)
- Oda Carmen Gisela Henriette (* 20 January 1927 in Wohlmirstedt; † 7 November 2012)
- Hans-Benno Ferdinand Heinrich (* 3 March 1929 in Harzburg; † 10 August 2016)
- Olaf Rüdiger Heinrich (* 15 May 1936 in Berlin; † 14 January 2022)

== Awards and decorations ==
- 1939 Clasp to the Iron Cross 2nd Class and 1st Class
- 1914 Iron Cross 2nd Class and 1st Class
- Honour Chevron for the Old Guard, 1934
- The Honour Cross of the World War 1914/1918 with Swords, 1934
- Golden Party Badge, 1938
- War Merit Cross 2nd Class with Swords and 1st Class with Swords
- Nazi Party Long Service Award in bronze and silver
