= Wettin =

Wettin may refer to:

- House of Wettin, a German Royal House
- Wettin Castle, near Halle, Saxony-Anhalt, Germany, ancestral seat of the House of Wettin
- Asteroid 90709 Wettin, named in the castle and House's honour
- Wettin, Saxony-Anhalt, a town in Saxony-Anhalt, where Wettin Castle is located
- Wettinus Augiensis (d. 824)
- SMS Wettin, a German pre-dreadnought battleship
