= Dietrich, Count of Plötzkau =

Dietrich (11th century), Count of Plötzkau', son of Bernhard I von Kakelingen, Count of Harzgau and his wife Ida of Querfurt. Little is known about Dietrich or his ancestors other than their familial relations. Dietrich was the brother of Gebhard of Supplinburg, a Saxon count, who was the father of Lothair II, Holy Roman Emperor. Ida, the mother of Dietrich, was niece of Saint Bruno of Querfurt.

Dietrich married Mathilde von Walbeck, daughter of Conrad, Count of Walbeck. Dietrich and Mathilde had four children:

- Helperich von Plötzkau, Margrave of the Nordmark
- Conrad von Plötzkau
- Irmgard von Plötzkau, married to Lothair Udo III, Margrave of the Nordmark
- Adelheid von Plötzkau, married Otto I, Burgrraf von Regensburg, son of Heinrich I, Graf von Sinzing.

Upon his death, Dietrich was succeed as Count of Plötzkau by his son Helperich.
