= Dietrich I =

Dietrich I, or Theodoric I, may refer to:

- Theodoric I of Wettin (ca. 916 – ca. 976)
- Dietrich I of Metz (died 984)
- Dietrich I, Duke of Upper Lorraine (born c. 965, died in 1026 or 1027)
- Dietrich I, Count of Cleves (ruled 1092–1119)
- Dietrich I, Margrave of Lusatia (ca. 1118 – 1185)
- Theodoric I, Margrave of Meissen (1162–1221)
- Dietrich I von Hengebach (born around 1150, died after 1223)
- Dietrich I of Isenberg (before 1215 – 1301)
- Dietrich Schenk von Erbach (died in 1459)
