= Siegfried II of Stade =

Count of Stade

Siegfried II (c. 956 – 1037), Count of Stade, was the youngest son of Henry I the Bald, Count of Stade, and his wife Judith von der Wetterau, granddaughter of Gebhard, Duke of Lorraine. He succeeded his brother, Henry as Count of Stade in 1016. He was captured by pirates, but later escaped.

Siegfried married Adela of Rhienfelden, daughter of Gero, Count of Alsleben, and his wife Adela. Siegfried and Adelaide had three children:

- Lothair Udo II, Count of Stade, and Margrave of Nordmark (as Lothair Udo I)
- Irmgard von Stade, Abbess of Alsleben
- Bertha von Stade, Abbess of Alsleben.

Siegfried was succeeded as Count of Stade by his son Lothair Udo II.

== Sources ==
- Warner, David A., Ottonian Germany: The Chronicon of Thietmar of Merseburg, Manchester University Press, Manchester, 2001
- Bury, J. B. (editor), The Cambridge Medieval History: Volume III, Germany and the Western Empire, Cambridge University Press, 1922
- Hucke, Richard G., Die Grafen von Stade 900-1144. Genealogie, politische Stellung, Comitat und Allodialbesitz der sächsischen Udonen; Diss. Kiel, Stade mit umfassenden Nachweisen der Quellen und älteren Literatur, 1956
