= Lothar II the Old =

Lothar II the Elder (died 986), Count of Walbeck, son of Lothar I, Count of Walbeck.

Thietmar of Merseburg reported that his grandfather Lothar participated in the plot to assassinate Emperor Otto I by his brother Henry on Easter 941 and lost all his property as a result. He was imprisoned for a year at Imgelheim by Berthold of Schweinfurt, Count in the Radenzgau. Lothar paid a heavy fine and founded the canon at Walbeck as atonement. Berthold later married Lothar’s daughter Eilika.

Lothar married Mathilde von Arneburg, daughter of Bruno, Count of Arneburg, and Frederuna, daughter of Volkmar, Count of Harzgau. Mathilde’s nephew was Bruno of Querfurt, son of her brother Bruno, Count of Querfurt. Lothar and Mathilde had four children:

- Lothar III von Walbeck, who became Margrave of the Nordmark (as Lothair I)
- Eilika von Walbeck, married Berthold of Schweinfurt, Count in the Radenzgau
- Siegfried I the Older, Count of Walbeck, married Kunigunde von Stade, daughter of Henry I the Bald, Count of Stade. They were the parents of Thietmar of Merseburg.
- Dietmar von Walbeck, Abbot of Corvey.

Lothar was succeeded as Count of Walbeck by his son Siegfried upon his death.

== Sources ==
- Warner, David A., Ottonian Germany: The Chronicon of Thietmar of Merseburg, Manchester University Press, Manchester, 2001
- Heinrich, Leo, Lectures on the History of the German people and Reich, E. Anton, 1867
- Big, Walthe, The Counts of Walbeck, Resin Magazine, 1952
- Leyser, Karl, Medieval Germany and Its Neighbours 900-1250, The Hambledon Press, London, 1982
- Bury, J. B. (editor), The Cambridge Medieval History: Volume III, Germany and the Western Empire, Cambridge University Press, 1922
