= Theodoric I of Wettin =

Saxon nobleman

Theodoric I
- Born: c. 920
- Died: 976 (age 56)
- Spouse: Jutta of Magdeburg
- Issue: Dedo I, Count of Wettin; Frederick I of Wettin
Names
- Theodoric I von Wettin
- House: Wettin

Theodoric I von Wettin (German: Dietrich), also known as Thierry, was a nobleman in the Duchy of Saxony and the oldest traceable member of the House of Wettin.

== Biography ==
Theodoric was born in the early 10th century to unknown parents. He married Jutta of Magdeburg. They had at least two sons, Dedo and Frederick. He is mentioned as Dedo's father by bishop Thietmar of Merseburg. Dedo is the first known count of Wettin, and Dedo's son, Theodoric II, Margrave of Lower Lusatia, is considered as the first member of the Wettin dynasty, considered to have been founded by his father, Theodoric I. Theodoric I inherited or otherwise acquired Wettin Castle during his career, perhaps from his father. As his son Dedo held the rank of Count, Theodoric may also have been a Count of Wettin. Little is known about his political career, other than that he was a supporter of the Dukes of Saxony. He died in 976 in a feud against his son.

== Issue ==
Theodoric had two sons:

- Dedo I, Count of Wettin (c. 950 – 1009)
- Frederick I, Count of Wettin and Eilenburg (died 1017), with no known issue

== Ancestral theories ==
Thietmar names Theodoric as a member of the tribe of the Buzici (de tribu, quae Buzici dicitur) and as a relative on his father's side of Rikdag, Margrave of Meissen (r. 979 – 985). Several possible fathers have been identified for him, but there is no conclusive evidence for any of them:

- Dedi, count in the Hassegau (count in 940, died 957), one of the retainers of Otto I, a descendant of Burchard, Duke of Thuringia. Proposed by Friedrich Kurze (1886), based on the name Buzici (Buzo as short form Burchard, i.e. the Buzici would be the Burchardings).
- Burchard III, Duke of Swabia (born 906 or 915, died 973), proposed by Reinhard Wenskus (1976) and later Stefan Pätzold (1997), also based on the interpretation of Buzici as a derived from the name Burchard.
- Burchard II, Duke of Swabia (died 926): the association with Liesgau is connected to this hypothesis, as a Swabian count named Burchard is attested for Liesgau in 965 (known as Burchard IV. im Hassegau, brother of Dedi I of Hassegau). This Burchard is suggested as the son of Burchard II and an older brother of Theodoric.
- Folcmar (Volkmar) count in the Harzgau (died before 961) (suggestion mentioned in Lexikon des Mittelalters.)

Depending on who is assumed to be Theodoric's father, it is reasonable to assume a date of birth for Theodoric in the 910s, 920s or 930s. The year of his death has been proposed as 975/6, because it is known that his son Dedo in this year took his own mother hostage in the context of a feud (presumably against his father). Theodoric's wife is named as one Jutta or Judith of Merseburg in early modern historiography.

== Sources ==
- Albert, Duke of Saxony, Die Wettiner in Lebensbildern, Graz, Wien, Köln (1995).
- Flathe, Heinrich Theodor (1894). "Dietrich de tribu Buzizi" . Allgemeine Deutsche Biographie (in German). Vol. 37. Leipzig: Duncker & Humblot. p. 746.
- Kaemmel, Otto, Festschrift zur 800 jährigen Jubelfeier des Hauses Wettin. Dresden Hoffmann (1889).
- Pätzold, Stefan, Die frühen Wettiner. Adelsfamilie und Hausüberlieferung bis 1221 (1997).
- Posse, Otto, Die Markgrafen von Meissen und das Haus Wettin bis zu Konrad dem Grossen, Leipzig (1881).
- Posse, Otto, Die Wettiner. Genealogie des Gesammthauses Wettin, Leipzig (1897).
- Schwarz, Hilmar, Die Wettiner des Mittelalters und ihre Bedeutung für Thüringen, Leipzig (1994).
- Wenskus, Reinhard, Sächsischer Stammesadel und fränkischer Reichsadel, Vandenhoeck & Ruprecht, Göttingen (1976).
