= Dedo I of Wettin =

Count of Wettin

Dedo I
- Count of Wettin
- Born: 963
- Died: November 13, 1009 (aged 45–46)
- Spouse: Thietberga of Nordmark
- Issue: Theodoric II
- House: Wettin
- Father: Theodoric I of Wettin
- Mother: Jutta of Merseburg

Dedo I, Count of Wettin (c. 963 – 13 November 1009), also known as Dedo I of Wettin, was a son of Theodoric I of Wettin and Jutta of Merseburg.

== Life ==
In his youth, Dedo lived in the household of his kinsman Rikdag, Margrave of Meissen, Zeitz and Merseburg, and was thus closely connected with one of the most influential men in eastern Saxony. Before 985, Dedo married Thietburga, a daughter of Dietrich of Haldensleben, Margrave of the Nordmark.

Between 974 and 985, Dedo was involved in the rebellion of Henry II, Duke of Bavaria against the Holy Roman Emperor Otto II and later against his son Otto III, until June 985, when the Bavarian duke finally submitted at Frankfurt.

In 976, Dedo commanded a Bohemian army, conquered the March of Zeitz, and plundered the bishop's church. It is alleged that he even took his own mother prisoner.

Dedo apparently had a good relationship with Archbishop Giselher of Magdeburg, who helped him acquire comital rights in the northern Hassegau. Dedo also successfully claimed the castle of Zörbig for himself and his brother Friedrich.

The years before Dedo's death were overshadowed by a feud with the Counts of Walbeck. When his father-in-law was deposed as Margrave of the Nordmark, Dedo claimed the office of margrave for himself. Instead, it was granted to Lothair, Count of Derlingau and Nordthüringgau, who ruled the Nordmark from 983 to 1003.

Bishop Thietmar of Merseburg, Lothair's nephew, relates in his chronicle that Dedo I took part in the devastation of the castle of Wolmirstedt, then in the possession of the Counts of Walbeck. Dedo's dispute with the house of Walbeck continued with Lothair's son and successor Werner von Walbeck (margrave 1003–1009; d. 1014). Dedo was killed by Werner on 13 November 1009, along with his vassals, near Mose at the confluence of the Tange and Elbe rivers.

== Marriage and issue ==
Dedo and Thietburga of Haldensleben had the following children:

- Theodoric II (c. 970–1034), Count of Wettin and, from 1031, Margrave of Lusatia.
