= Conrad, Count of Walbeck =

Conrad (1018–1073), Count of Walbeck and Viscount (Burggraf) of Magdeburg, son of Friedrick, Count of Walbeck, and Thietburga. There is little known about Conrad's reign.

The name of the wife is not known. They had only one recorded daughter:

- Mathilde, married to Dietrich, Count of Plötzkau, and mother of Helperich, Margrave of the Nordmark.

Conrad was the last Count of Walbeck with the position transitioning to the Margraves of the Nordmark. He was succeeded as Viscount of Magdeburg by Hermann von Sponheim, son of Siegfried I, Count of Sponheim.

== Sources ==
- Warner, David A., Ottonian Germany: The Chronicon of Thietmar of Merseburg, Manchester University Press, Manchester, 2001
- Grosse, Walther, Die Grafen von Walbeck. In: Harz-Zeitschrift, 1952
