= Lothair Udo I of Stade =

Count of Stade (950–994)

Lothair Udo I (950 – 23 June 994) was count of Stade. He was the son of Count Henry the Bald and his wife Judith of the Wetterau, granddaughter of Duke Gebhard of Lorraine. Lothair is frequently confused with his nephew Lothair Udo II, son of his brother Siegfried II, who was margrave of Nordmark as Lothair Udo I.

The writings of Thietmar of Merseburg describe the deaths of his three maternal uncles Henry, Udo [Lothair Udo I] and Siegfried, captured by pirates with Count Adalgar, and reported that Udo was killed in battle with the Vikings.

Lothair married a daughter of Count Siegbert of Liesgau, and had two children:

- Henry III, canon at Hildesheim Cathedral, after 1002
- Udo (986-1040), count of Liesgau and Rittegau, married to Bertrada of an unknown family. Their son Dietrich I of Kahleberg was killed in the Battle of Werben on 10 September 1056. Dietrich married Bertrada, daughter of Count Dirk III of Holland.

== Sources ==
- Warner, David A., Ottonian Germany: The Chronicon of Thietmar of Merseburg, Manchester University Press, Manchester, 2001
- Reuter, Timothy, Germany in the Early Middle Ages, 800-1036, London and New York, 1992
- Bury, J. B. (editor), The Cambridge Medieval History: Volume III, Germany and the Western Empire, Cambridge University Press, 1922
- Hucke, Richard G., Die Grafen von Stade 900-1144. Genealogie, politische Stellung, Comitat und Allodialbesitz der sächsischen Udonen; Diss. Kiel, Stade mit umfassenden Nachweisen der Quellen und älteren Literatur, 1956
