= Lothar I, Count of Walbeck =

German noble

Lothar I (c. 902–929), Count of Walbeck, of unknown parentage. Lothar was the great-grandfather of Thietmar of Merseburg, and is frequently confused in genealogical sources with Thietmar's other great-grandfather of the same name who was Count of Stade.

Lothar died fighting the Slavs in the Battle of Lenzen, as did Lothar II, Count of Stade. Thietmar describes his great-grandfathers (called Liuthar in his Chronicon), as “distinguished men, the best of warriors, of illustrious lineage, and the honour and solace of the homeland.”

Lothar's wife's name is also unknown. They had one child - Lothar II the Old, Count of Walbeck.

Upon his death, Lothar was succeeded as Count of Walbeck by his son and namesake.

== Sources ==
- Warner, David A., Ottonian Germany: The Chronicon of Thietmar of Merseburg, Manchester University Press, Manchester, 2001
- Big, Walther, The Counts of Walbeck, Resin Magazine, 1952
- Leyser, Karl, Medieval Germany and Its Neighbours 900-1250, The Hambledon Press, London, 1982
- Bury, J. B. (editor), The Cambridge Medieval History: Volume III, Germany and the Western Empire, Cambridge University Press, 1922
