= Dirk I =

Dirk I may refer to:

- Dirk I, Count of Holland from ca. 896 to ca. 928 or 939
- Dirk I van Valkenburg (died 1227)
- Dirk I (bishop) (died in 1197)
- Dirk I van Brederode (ca. 1180–1236)
