= Bucha, Saxony-Anhalt =

Bucha
- Ortsteil of Kaiserpfalz
- Interactive map of Bucha
- Location within Germany Location within Saxony-Anhalt
- Coordinates: 51°13′N 11°30′E
- Country: Germany
- State: Saxony-Anhalt
- District: Burgenlandkreis
- Town: Kaiserpfalz

Area
  - Total: 7.84 km^{2} (3.03 sq mi)
- Elevation: 244 m (801 ft)

Population (2006-12-31)
  - Total: 285
  - Density: 36.4/km^{2} (94.2/sq mi)
- Time zone: UTC+01:00 (CET)
  - Summer (DST): UTC+02:00 (CEST)
- Postal codes: 06642
- Dialling codes: 034465

Bucha (German pronunciation: [ˈbuːxa]) is a village and a former municipality in the Burgenlandkreis district, in Saxony-Anhalt, Germany. Since 1 July 2009, it is part of the municipality Kaiserpfalz.
