= Wohlmirstedt =

- Ortsteil of Kaiserpfalz
- Interactive map of Wohlmirstedt
- Location within Germany Location within Saxony-Anhalt
- Coordinates: 51°15′N 11°28′E
- Country: Germany
- State: Saxony-Anhalt
- District: Burgenlandkreis
- Town: Kaiserpfalz

Area
  - Total: 12.96 km^{2} (5.00 sq mi)
- Elevation: 42 m (138 ft)

Population (2006-12-31)
  - Total: 944
  - Density: 72.8/km^{2} (189/sq mi)
- Time zone: UTC+01:00 (CET)
  - Summer (DST): UTC+02:00 (CEST)
- Postal codes: 06642
- Dialling codes: 034672
- Vehicle registration: BLK
- Website: www.vgem-finne.de

Wohlmirstedt (German pronunciation: [ˈvoːlɪʁˌʃtɛt]) is a village and a former municipality in the Burgenlandkreis district, in Saxony-Anhalt, Germany. Since 1 July 2009, it is part of the municipality Kaiserpfalz.

The first reference to Wohlmirstedt (Wolmerstede) is for 786. In 998 it came into possession of Memleben Abbey.

== Sights ==
- Protestant Church St. Maria Magdalena (early 16th century)
