= Wettin Castle =

Former castle near the town of Wettin on the Saale river in Germany

Coordinates: 51.58315°N 11.81060°E

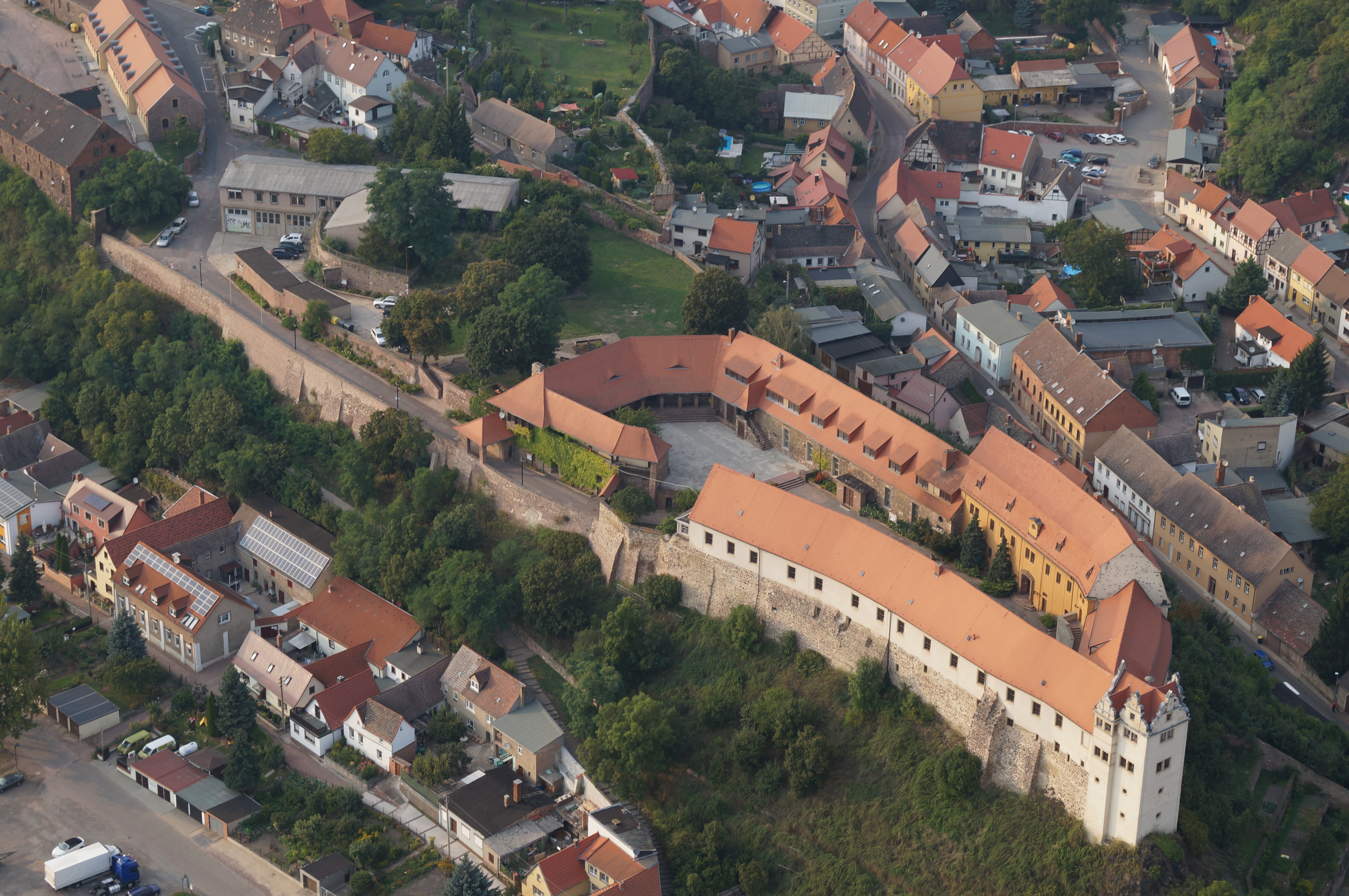
Wettin Castle in 2013

Wettin Castle is a former castle that stood near the town of Wettin on the Saale river in Germany, and which is the ancestral home of the House of Wettin, the dynasty that included several royal families, including that of the current ruling families of the United Kingdom and Belgium.

In 982, Dedo I (d. 1009) and Frederick (d. 1017), sons of Theodoric I of Wettin, perhaps count of Hassegau, received lands taken from the Wends, including the county (or Gau) of Wettin on the right bank of the Saale. There is a legend that the family is descended from one Wettekind, but this can not be attested in any history. At least one reference claims that the castle was built by a descendant of Dietrich named Thimo.

That castle is a rebuilt ruin, used as part of a building that houses a school and other public institutions but other castles owned by the Wettin family, from the 15th century, still exist in Meissen, and on the Elbe river.
