= Hassegau =

Medieval shire in the Duchy of Saxony

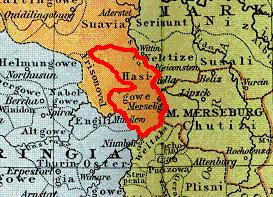
Hassegau about 1000, 19th century map

The Hassegau was a medieval shire (Gau) in the Eastphalia region of the Duchy of Saxony. It was located in the duchy's southeastern corner; confined by the Saale river to the east and its Unstrut and Wipper tributaries to the south and north. Its most important town was Merseburg. In present-day borders, it is in the southeastern part of Saxony-Anhalt.

The Hassegau was bordered by the Saxon shires of Schwabengau (Suavia) in the north and Friesenfeld in the west. The Friesenfeld is considered a distinct shire by some sources, but in other sources it is considered part of the Hassegau. In the southwest, it bordered on the Engilin shire of Thuringia. The lands beyond the Saale river in the east were settled by Polabian Slavs (Wends); they were incorporated into the Saxon Eastern March from the early 10th century onwards and divided into the adjacent Gaue of Nudzici (including the burgward of Wettin), Chutizi (later merged into the March of Merseburg) and Weitaha.

The meaning of the name Hassegau is unclear; but it may be derived from the Hesse region in the Duchy of Franconia, since several nearby shires have names that are clearly derived from other distant Germanic tribes (Schwabengau, Friesenfeld, Engilin). Possibly, these names signify the tribes that colonized the areas and most estates in the Hassegau were tributary to Hersfeld Abbey in Hesse.

In the mid-10th century, King Otto I established the County Palatine of Saxony in parts of the Hassegau. In 968, he founded the Bishopric of Merseburg, which had as temporal property inside the Hassegau only the town of Merseburg itself, where Merseburg Cathedral was erected from 1015 onwards. In the northern part of the shire, the comital House of Mansfeld established itself in the 11th century. By 1200, the shire had completely disintegrated, and apart from the Merseburg bishopric and the County of Mansfeld, parts of it belonged to the Archbishopric of Magdeburg (Halle) and the Lordship of Querfurt.

One Dedi (Theti) is mentioned as Count in the Hassegau in a 949 deed issued by King Otto I. His successors included members of the noble houses of Wettin and Mansfeld, among others. In 1017 the Wettin count Theodoric II received the Hassegau from the hands of Emperor Henry II for his support in the German–Polish. In 1029 Margrave Herman I of Meissen was appointed count in the Hassegau and the adjacent Chutizi territory by Emperor Conrad II. In 1069, King Henry IV ceded large parts of the territory to Count Hoyer of Mansfeld.
