= Kaiserpfalz, Saxony-Anhalt =

Kaiserpfalz
- Municipality
- Location of Kaiserpfalz within Burgenlandkreis district
- Interactive map of Kaiserpfalz
- Location within Germany Location within Saxony-Anhalt
- Coordinates: 51°15′N 11°29′E
- Country: Germany
- State: Saxony-Anhalt
- District: Burgenlandkreis
- Municipal assoc.: An der Finne
- Subdivisions: 9

Government
  - Mayor (2023–30): Andreas Reiche

Area
  - Total: 41.08 km^{2} (15.86 sq mi)

Population (2025-12-31)
  - Total: 1,511
  - Density: 36.78/km^{2} (95.26/sq mi)
- Time zone: UTC+01:00 (CET)
  - Summer (DST): UTC+02:00 (CEST)
- Postal codes: 06642
- Dialling codes: 034465, 034672
- Vehicle registration: BLK

Kaiserpfalz (German pronunciation: [ˈkaɪzɐˌpfalts]) is a municipality in the Burgenlandkreis district, in Saxony-Anhalt, Germany. It was formed by the merger of the previously independent municipalities Bucha, Memleben and Wohlmirstedt, on 1 July 2009.
