= Counts of Walbeck =

Rulers of medieval Walbeck in present-day Saxony-Anhalt

- First holder: Lothar I
- Last holder: Conrad
- Extinction date: 1018
- Seat: Walbeck

The Counts of Walbeck ruled a medieval territory with its capital Walbeck northeast of Helmstedt in the present town Oebisfelde-Weferlingen in Saxony-Anhalt. The foundation of the Archbishopric of Magdeburg established the region as firmly in the oversight of Otto the Great, Holy Roman Emperor. The first Count of Walbeck, Lothar I, was great-grandfather of Thietmar, Prince-Bishop of Merseburg, chronicler of the Ottonian dynasty of Germany and the Holy Roman Empire. Two of Thietmar’s great-grandfathers, both named Lothar, were killed in the Battle of Lenzen, pitting the forces of Henry the Fowler against the Slavs. The early Margraves of the Nordmark were descended from the House of Walbeck.

There were close relationships, and rivalries, between the Counts of Walbeck and the Counts of Stade. The family tree of the Counts of Walbeck is provided in Warner’s Ottonian Germany, a translation of the Chronicon of Thietmar of Merseburg. An excellent source of information is the German Wikipedia article Grafschaft Walbeck.

The Counts of Walbeck were:

- Lothar I (-929)
- Lothar II the Old (929-986)
- Siegfried I the Older (986-991), son of the previous and father of Thietmar of Merseberg
- Henry (991-1004), son of the previous
- Frederick (1004-1012), brother of the previous
- Conrad (1012 -1018), son of the previous.

After Conrad, the Counts of Walbeck transitioned to the Margraves of Nordmark (Northern March). Helperich, grandson of Conrad, is also listed as a Count of Walbeck, but the title was likely ceremonial.
