= Burgward =

Form of settlement of the Kingdom of Germany

A burgward or castellany was a form of settlement used for the organisation of the northeastern marches of the Kingdom of Germany in the mid-10th century. Based on earlier organisations within the Frankish Empire and among the Slavs, the burgwards were composed of a central fortification (a burg) with a number of smaller, undefended villages, perhaps ten to twenty (the ward), dependent on it for protection and upon which it was dependent economically. The fortified site served as a place of refuge during attack and also as an administrative centre for tax collection, the Church, and the court system. It was given a garrison of cavalry, usually Slavic.

The first burgwards (civitates or Burgen) were Merovingian and Carolingian constructions, mostly built to defend against the Saxons. An important line of burgwards lay along the Unstrut west of Merseburg, but it declined in importance in the early ninth century after the integration of the Saxons into the Frankish state. The first burgwards in Sorbian territory were founded in the 940s. Not much later they were being established among the Hevelli and around Brandenburg. There were three lines of burgwards defending eastern Thuringia. Many burgwards were controlled by monasteries, such as Hersfeld and Fulda.

The burgwards were detested by the Slavs, but they were effective in their time. They converted the "tribute-paying peoples" into "census-paying peasants." The German reverses of 983, however, doomed the burgward structure and began a new epoch of Slavic independence in the region (until the 12th century).

== Sources ==
- Reuter, Timothy. Germany in the Early Middle Ages 800–1056. New York: Longman, 1991. p 66.
- Bernhardt, John W. Itinerant Kingship and Royal Monasteries in Early Medieval Germany, c. 936–1075. Cambridge: Cambridge University Press, 1993.
