= Henry the Bald =

Count of Stade

Henry I the Bald (died 11 May 976) was the Count of Stade. He was the son of Lothar II, Count of Stade, and Swanhild of Saxony. Henry is recorded as a cousin of Otto I, Holy Roman Emperor, but their exact relationship remains a mystery. Henry was also appointed Count of Heilangau, the ancient capital of Stade, in 959.

Apparently, when Henry’s father died in the Battle of Lenzen, the county of Stade was taken by Wichmann the Elder and his two sons, not to return to the family of Lothar until 967. Henry's grandson Thietmar of Merseburg recounts that Henry tried to capture Margrave Hermann Billung because of “arrogance” in ceremonial matters, but failed.

Henry married first Judith von der Wetterau (925-973), sister of Conrad I, Duke of Swabia. Their father was either Conrad or Udo, son of Gebhard, Duke of Lorraine. Henry and Judith had:

- Henry II the Good, Count of Stade
- Lothair Udo I, Count of Stade
- Gerberg von Stade (d. 1000), married Dietrich I, Count of Querfurt. Their son was Dietrich, Bishop of Münster.
- Kunigunde von Stade (956-997), married Siegfried I the Older, Count of Walbeck. Their son was Thietmar, Prince-Bishop of Merseburg, chronicler of the Ottonian dynasty of Germany and the Holy Roman Empire.
- Herwig von Stade
- Emnilde von Stade
- Siegfried II, Count of Stade.

Henry married Hildegard von Reinhausen, daughter of Elli I, Count of Reinhausen, for his second marriage. Henry and Hildegard had one child:

- Hildegarde von Stade (974- 3 October 1011), married Bernard I, Duke of Saxony, son of Hermann Billung, Margrave of the Billung March, and his wife Countess Oda.

Henry was succeeded as Count of Stade by his brother Siegfried I. The date of succession is unclear, but it was possibly as early as 973.

== Sources ==
- Reuter, Timothy, Germany in the Early Middle Ages, 800-1036, London and New York, 1992
- Bachrach, B. S. (translator), Widukind of Corvey, Deeds of the Saxons, The Catholic University of America Press, Washington, DC, 2004
- Leyser, Karl, Medieval Germany and Its Neighbours 900-1250, The Hambledon Press, London, 1982
- Bury, J. B. (editor), The Cambridge Medieval History: Volume III, Germany and the Western Empire, Cambridge University Press, 1922
- Warner, David, ed. (2001). Ottonian Germany: The Chronicon of Thietmar of Merseburg. Manchester University Press.
