= Lothair I, Margrave of the Nordmark =

Lothair I
- Margrave of the Nordmark and Count of Walbeck
- Tenure: 983–1003
- Born: c. 940
- Died: 25 January 1003 (aged 62–63)
- Buried: Cologne
- Noble family: Walbeck
- Spouse: Godila of Rothenburg
- Issue: Werner, Margrave of the Nordmark; Lothar, Count of Harzgau; Berthold of Walbeck; Dietrich, Canon at Magdeburg; Brigida, Abbess of St. Lawrence
- Father: Lothar II the Old, Count of Walbeck
- Mother: Mathilda of Arneburg

Lothair I (Lothar, Liuthar) (ca. 940 – 25 January 1003) was Margrave of the Nordmark (Northern March) from about 983 until his death. He was also a member of Saxon nobility as Count of Derlingau and of Nordthüringgau.

Born the eldest son of Lothar II the Old, Count of Walbeck, and Matilda von Arneburg, he succeeded his father as Lothar III, Count of Walbeck, in 964. He was a paternal uncle of the chronicler Bishop Thietmar of Merseburg, son of his younger brother Siegfried. Lothair did not inherit the County of Walbeck, but rather became count in the Derlingau and Nordthüringgau of Eastphalia in 982. When his brother Siegfried died in 990, he tried to seize all his mother's possessions to the disadvantage of his nephews.

After Count Dietrich of Haldensleben in 983 had been deposed from the Northern March for failing to defend the bishoprics of Brandenburg and Havelberg east of the Elbe river in the Great Slav Rising, he was replaced by Lothair, who was first mentioned as margrave in 993. However, his attempts to wrest the eastern territories of the Northern March from the Slavic Lutici were unsuccessful and he actually ruled only over a small strip of land along the Elbe in the southwest. Lothair came into conflict with Margrave Eckard I of Meissen over the arranged marriage of his eldest son Werner with Eckard's daughter Liutgard, which the Meissen margrave opposed. He therefore put up resistance against Eckard's candidacy for the succession of late Emperor Otto III in 1002 and won the Saxon nobles over for the support of rivaling Duke Henry IV of Bavaria. Eckard was murdered in the same year, and the wedding of Werner and Liutgard could take place.

Lothair married Godila (d. 1015), daughter of Werner, Count of Rothenburg. Lothair and Godila had five children:

- Werner, Margrave of the Nordmark
- Lothar (d. in battle, 1033), Count of Harzgau. Sometimes referred to as Lothar IV, Count of Walbeck, but not included in Thietmar's description of the House of Lothar.
- Berthold von Walbeck (d. 1018 or after), married Irmgard von Aspel (d. before 1022), daughter of Godizo, Count of Aspel, and Adela de Verdun, daughter of Godfrey the Prisoner, Count of Verdun
- Dietrich, Canon at Magdeburg
- Birgida, Abbess of St. Lawrence at Magdeburg. Sometimes claimed as daughter of Frederick, Count of Walbeck.

Margrave Lothair died in 1003 and was buried in Cologne. His widow, Godila of Rothenburg, remained unmarried for four years after his death, eventually marrying Herman II, Count of Werl. His first-born son Werner succeeded him in the Northern March and his second son, Count Lothar IV of Walbeck, eventually also placed a claim on it. His third son, Berthold, rebelled in 1017 and submitted in 1018, and his youngest son, Dietrich, became a canon at Magdeburg around 1008.

== Sources ==
- Warner, David A., Ottonian Germany: The Chronicon of Thietmar of Merseburg, Manchester University Press, Manchester, 2001
- Heinrich, Leo, Lectures on the History of the German people and Reich, E. Anton, 1867
- Big, Walther: The Counts of Walbeck, Resin Magazine, 1952
- Leyser, Karl, Medieval Germany and Its Neighbours 900-1250, The Hambledon Press, London, 1982
- Bury, J. B. (editor), The Cambridge Medieval History: Volume III, Germany and the Western Empire, Cambridge University Press, 1922
