= Thietmar of Merseburg =

German bishop and historian (975–1018)

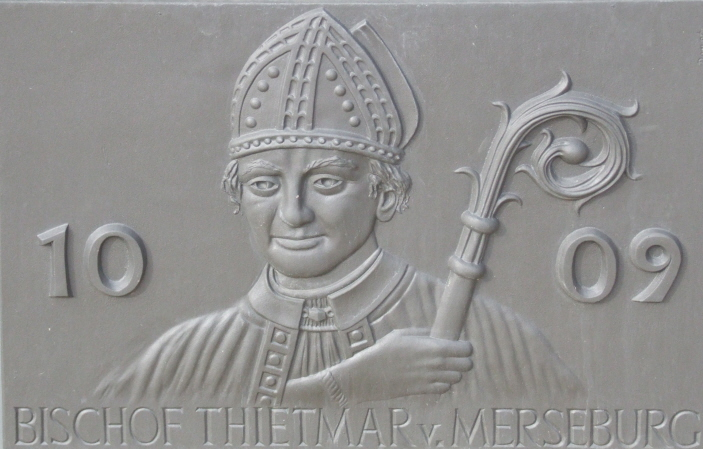
Thietmar of Merseburg in a Bas-relief by Karolin Donst, Tangermünde

Thietmar (also Dietmar or Dithmar; 25 July 975 – 1 December 1018), Prince-Bishop of Merseburg from 1009 until his death in 1018, was an important chronicler recording the reigns of German kings and Holy Roman Emperors of the Ottonian (Saxon) dynasty. Two of Thietmar's great-grandfathers, both referred to as Liuthar, were the Saxon nobles Lothar II, Count of Stade, and Lothar I, Count of Walbeck. They were both killed fighting the Slavs at the Battle of Lenzen.

== Life ==
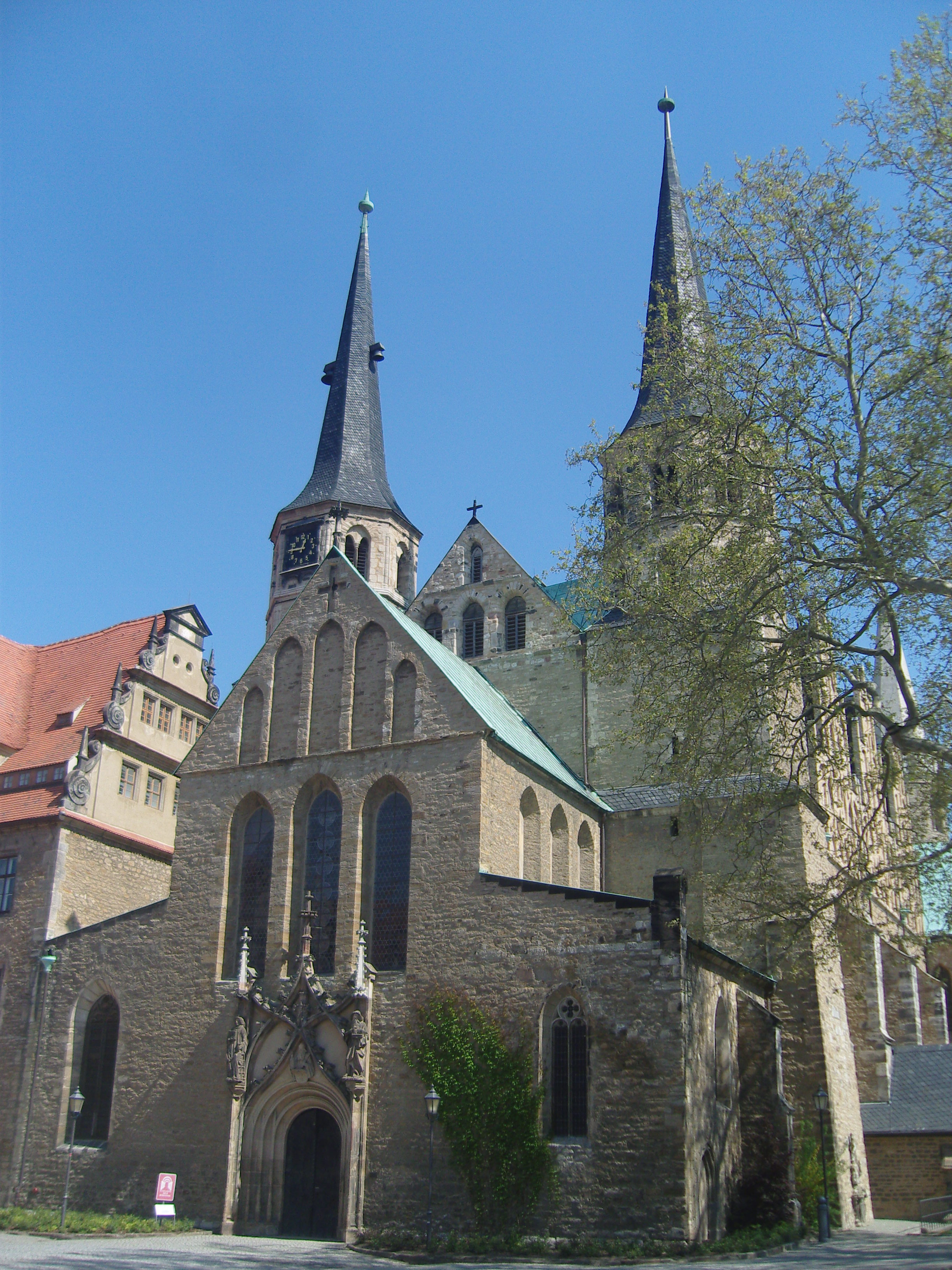
Merseburg Cathedral where Thietmar worked

Thietmar was a son of the Saxon count Siegfried I the Older of Walbeck (died 990) and his wife Kunigunde (died 997), daughter of Henry I the Bald, Count of Stade (House of Udonids). His father fought with Margrave Odo against Duke Mieszko I of Poland at the 972 Battle of Cedynia. At the time of Thietmar's birth, his family sided with the Ottonian duke Henry II of Bavaria ("the Wrangler") in his uprising against his cousin Emperor Otto II. Later, a balance was achieved; Siegfried became burgrave at Möckern and his brother Count Lothair of Walbeck served as margrave of the Northern March from 983 until his death in 1003.

Baptized in Halberstadt, Thietmar prepared for an ecclesiastical career. He was educated at the St. Servatius chapter of Quedlinburg Abbey and from 987 onwards at the Benedictine abbey of Berge in Buckau near Magdeburg. From 1 November 990, he attended the Magedeburg cathedral school, together with his relative Bruno of Querfurt. He was familiar with the works of Augustine of Hippo and with classical authors like Virgil, Horace, Lucan, and Macrobius.

Thietmar witnessed the struggles of the young Ottonian king Otto III and his mother Theophanu to secure their reign. He took some part in some political events of the time; in 994 he was a hostage in the hands of the Norsemen, and he was not unfamiliar with the actualities of war. Upon the death of his parents, he inherited large parts of the Walbeck estates and in 1002 became provost of the family monastery, established by his grandfather Count Lothair II. On 21 December 1004, he was ordained as a priest by Archbishop Tagino of Magdeburg.

In 1009, through the intercession of Archbishop Tagino, he became Bishop of the Merseburg diocese, which had been re-established by King Henry II in 1004. Thietmar was concerned with the full restitution of his bishopric. A loyal supporter of the German kingship, he rarely interfered in political affairs. He died on 1 December 1018 and was buried in Merseburg Cathedral.

== Thietmar's Chronicle ==
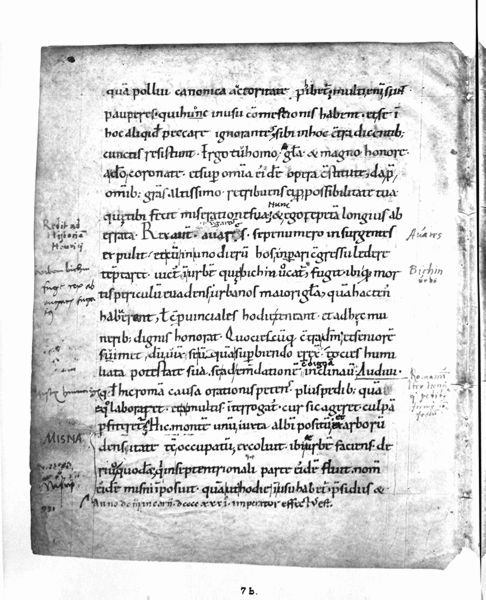
Page of Thietmar's Chronicle

Between 1012 and 1018 Thietmar, while Bishop of Merseburg, composed his chronicle Chronicon Thietmari, which comprises eight books, that cover the period between 908 and 1018, the Saxon Emperors Henry the Fowler, the three Ottos, and Henry II the Saint. As counsellor of the Emperor and participant in many important political transactions he was well equipped for writing a history of his times.

The first three books, covering the reigns of Henry I and the first two Ottos (Otto I and Otto II) are largely based on previous chronicles, most of which are still extant (e.g. Widukind of Corvey's Res gestae Saxonicae, the Annales Quedlinburgenses and others); the fourth book, comprising the reign of Otto III contains much original matter; while the remaining four books, which describe the reign of Henry II to the year 1018, are the independent narrative of Thietmar and, besides being the principal source for Saxon history during the reign of Henry II, contain valuable information not found elsewhere regarding the contemporary history and civilization of the Slavic tribes east of the river Elbe, as well as Poles, Hungarians and Bulgarians.

The surviving manuscript shows ongoing amendments and insertions by Thietmar after the text's completion. The 1913 Catholic Encyclopedia criticizes the style and composition of the writing, as well as the indiscriminate inclusion of unimportant events, but nevertheless recommends it as a historical source on the Saxony during the reigns of the emperors Otto III and Henry II. It contains a detailed history of the Bishopric of Merseburg, and of the wars against the Wends (Polabian Slavs) and the Poles.

The original manuscript was moved in 1570 to Dresden. When the city was destroyed by bombing during World War II the manuscript was severely damaged, and only a few folios remain intact. Fortunately, a complete facsimile edition had been published by L. Schmidt (Dresden, 1905).

Thietmar's statement that the Gero Cross in Cologne Cathedral was commissioned by Archbishop Gero, who died in 976, was dismissed by art historians, who thought he meant another cross, until the 1920s, and finally confirmed as correct in 1976 by dendrochronology.

== Editions and translations of Thietmar's Chronicle ==
Thietmari Merseburgensis episcopi Chronicon:

- Warner, David A., ed. (2001). Ottonian Germany: The Chronicon of Thietmar of Merseburg. Manchester and New York: Manchester University Press. (English translation)
- Trillmich, Werner, ed. (1957). Thietmar von Merseburg: Chronik. Darmstadt: Wissenschaftliche Buchgesellschaf. (Latin text and German translation)
- Holtzmann, Robert, ed. (1935). Die Chronik des Bischofs Thietmar von Merseburg und ihre Korveier Überarbeitung. Berlin: Weidmannsche Buchhandlung. (Latin text, available from digital MGH)
- Lappenbergius, Johannes Martinus; Kurze, Fridericus, eds. (1889). Thietmari Merseburgensis episcopi Chronicon. Hannoverae: Impensis Bibliopolii Hahniani. (PDF available online from the Internet Archive)
- Komarnicki, Z.E.T. (tr.), Kronika Dytmara, Biskupa Merseburgskiego jako jedno z najdawniejszych świadectw historycznych o Polsce.... Ksiegarni Jana Hussarowskiego, Żytomierz, 1861. (Polish translation)
- Laurent, J.C.M. (ed.). Die Chronik Thietmar's, Bischofs von Merseburg (Die Geschichtschreiber der deutschen Vorzeit, 11,1), Berlin 1848. (German translation)
- Lappenberg, Johann Martin (ed.). "Thietmari Chronicon a 919-1018." In Annales, chronica et historiae aevi Saxonici, ed. Heinrich Pertz. MGH Scriptores (in Folio) 3. Hanover, 1839. 723–871. Available online

Count Thietmar of Walbeck Born: 25 July 975 Died: 1 December 1018
Catholic Church titles
Regnal titles
Preceded by Wigbert of Merseburg	Prince-Bishop of Merseburg; 1009–1018	Succeeded by Bruno of Merseburg
