= Train in the Snow =

- Directed by: Mate Relja
- Screenplay by: Mate Relja
- Based on: Vlak u snijegu by Mato Lovrak
- Starring: Slavko Štimac; Željko Malčić; Gordana Inkret; Edo Peročević
- Cinematography: Ivica Rajković
- Edited by: Blaženka Jenčić
- Music by: Arsen Dedić
- Production company: Croatia Film
- Release date: 1976
- Running time: 82 minutes
- Country: Yugoslavia
- Language: Croatian

Train in the Snow (Croatian: Vlak u snijegu) is a Croatian children and adventure film directed by Mate Relja. It was released on 10 June 1976.

It is based on the children's novel Vlak u snijegu written by Mato Lovrak (1899–1974), then a young schoolteacher inspired by actual events, in 1933, and first titled Djeca Velikog Sela.

== Plot ==
At the behest of their teacher, fourth-grade schoolchildren in a small Croatian village found an old-style Slavic zadruga and organize a field trip to Zagreb. On their way back, their teacher gets ill and must stay at the hospital. As the children travel back on their own, the train gets blocked by a snowdrift. With the help of the children, the railroad workers manage to clear the way.

== Cast ==
- Slavko Štimac as Ljuban Marić
- Gordana Inkret as Draga
- Željko Malčić as Pero
- Edo Peročević as the conductor
- Ratko Buljan as the teacher
- Antun Nalis as the newspaper editor

== Locations ==
The film was shot from 1973 to 1976.

Most of the children came from the Regional school of Velika Ciglena near Bjelovar, which was then part of Dr Franko Vinter Elementary School in Bjelovar, now 1st Elementary School Bjelovar.

The scenes in Zagreb were taken at the Zagreb Glavni kolodvor, the Funicular, the Dolac Market, the National Theatre, the Zoo and a printing press.

Some scenes were filmed at the Rovišće railway station near Bjelovar.

The scenes in the school were shot in the village of Tomaš near Bjelovar, and the scenes in the snow near Grginac on the railroad between Bjelovar and Kloštar Podravski, with snow-blowers from Planica in Slovenia to provide artificial snow. At the end of the shooting, several scenes could be taken in real snow, which had started falling.

== First appearances ==
The film was first released in Bjelovar on 10 June 1976. On the same year, it was shown at the International Children's Festival of Šibenik and at the Pula Film Festival, where it received the Jelen award—the first children's film to receive it. It has been shown in 30 countries.

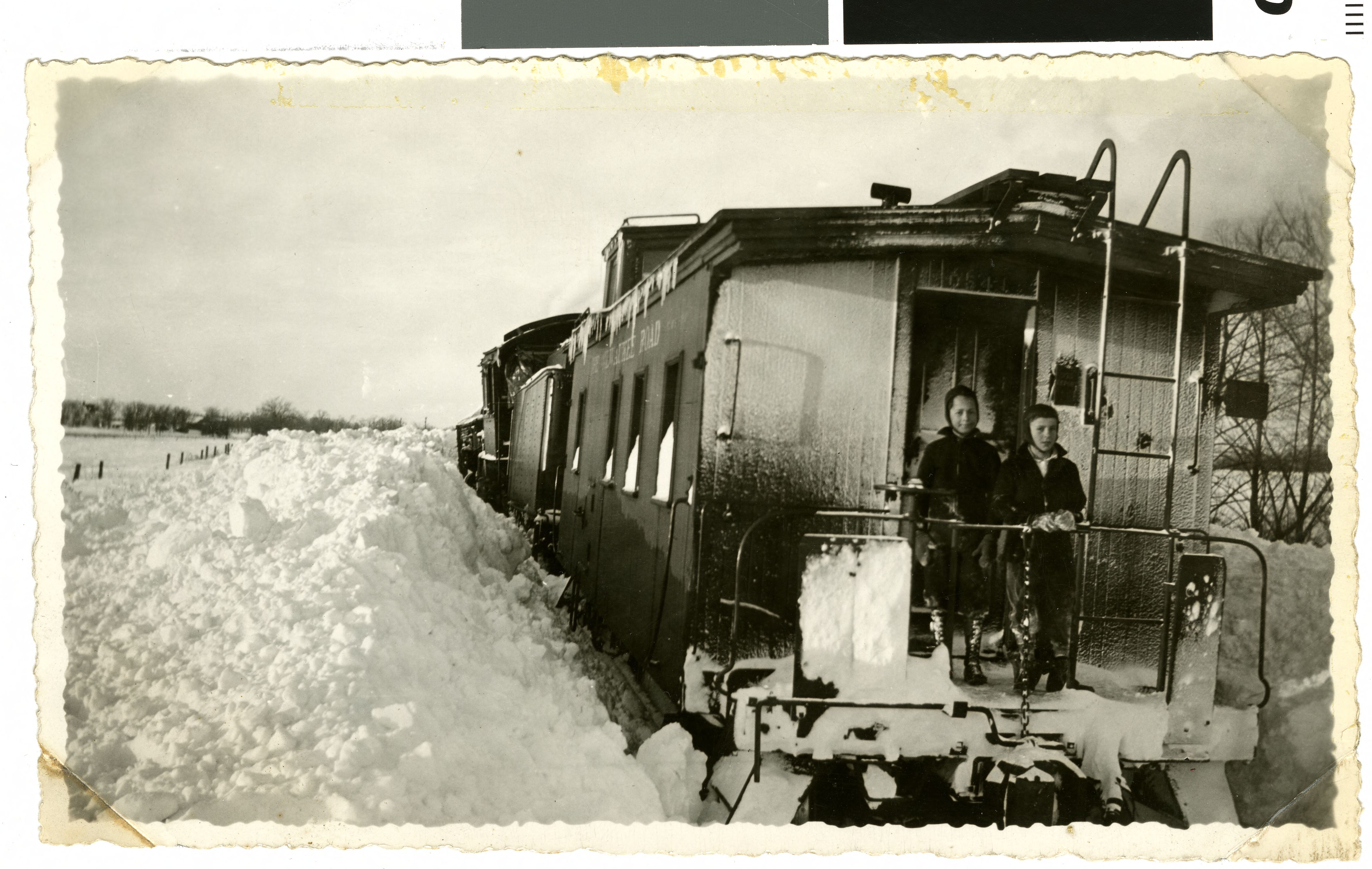
Children in a railwagon covered with snow similar to the scene in the movie

== Trains ==
A replica of the train from the film has been installed at the Lovrak center in Veliki Grđevac. The name of the novelist, Mato Lovrak, has now been given to the Bjelovar-Kloštar Podravski line.

== Theme song ==
The theme song "Kad se male ruke slože" ("When little hands join together"), written by popular singer Arsen Dedić, is a tale of friendship and solidarity. The lyrics, written by Drago Britvić, starts this way:

"Kad se mnogo malih složi,
"Ta se snaga stoput množi,
"A to znači da smo jači,
"Kad se skupimo u roj.
"Mala iskra požar skriva,
"Kap po kap i rijeka biva.
"Hajde zato svi u jato,
"Kao vrapci živ, živ, živ."

Ref: "Kad se male ruke slože, sve se može, sve se može."
