= Vlak u snijegu =

1931 children's novel by Mato Lovrak

Vlak u snijegu (English: A Train in the Snow), first called Djeca Velikog Sela --"The children of Veliko Selo") is a children's novel written by Croatian novelist Mato Lovrak (1899–1974), then a young schoolteacher inspired by actual events, in 1931.

Vlak u snijegu has been translated into German, Hungarian, Polish, Macedonian, Czech and Slovenian.

== Plot ==
At the suggestion of their teacher, fourth grade schoolchildren in imaginary "Jabukovac, near Veliko Selo", create an association and organize a field trip to the nearby town. There, they eat chocolate in a chocolate factory and spend the evening at a movie theater. As they are supposed to return to their village, their teacher gets ill and must stay in a hospital. The children travel back alone, and the train gets blocked by a snowdrift. With the help of the children, the railroad workers manage to clear the way.

== Film ==
In 1976 the novel was made into a children's film of the same name by director Mate Relja, who wrote the screenplay and changed the story somewhat:
the children traveled to Zagreb, where they visited the Upper Town, National Theatre, the Zoo and a printing press.

The film was first shown in Bjelovar on June 10, 1976. That same year, it received the Jelen award at the Pula film festival. It has been shown in 30 countries. It was shot in Zagreb, and near Bjelovar in the villages of Ciglena where most of the children came from, Tomaš where the school and village scenes were shot, and Grginac on the railroad between Bjelovar and Kloštar Podravski.

Another novel by Mato Lovrak, Družba Pere Kvržice ("Pero Kvržica's gang") was the basis for a film with the same title.

=== Actors ===
The main actors were Slavko Štimac (as Ljuban), and Gordana Inkret (as Draga) and Željko Malčić (as Pero), both from the "Franko Vinter" Elementary school in Bjelovar.

=== Trains ===
A replica of the train from the film has been installed at the Lovrak center in Veliki Grđevac. The name of the novelist, Mato Lovrak, has now been given to the Bjelovar-Kloštar Podravski line.

=== Theme song ===
The theme song "Kad se male ruke slože" ("When little hands join together"), written by popular singer Arsen Dedić, is a tale of friendship and solidarity. The text, written by Drago Britvić, begins this way:

"Kad se mnogo malih složi,
"Ta se snaga stoput množi,
"A to znači da smo jači,
"Kad se skupimo u roj.
"Mala iskra požar skriva,
"Kap po kap i rijeka biva.
"Hajde zato svi u jato,
"Kao vrapci živ, živ, živ."

Ref: "Kad se male ruke slože, sve se može, sve se može."
