= Svetovit =

Slavic deity

- God of abundance, war
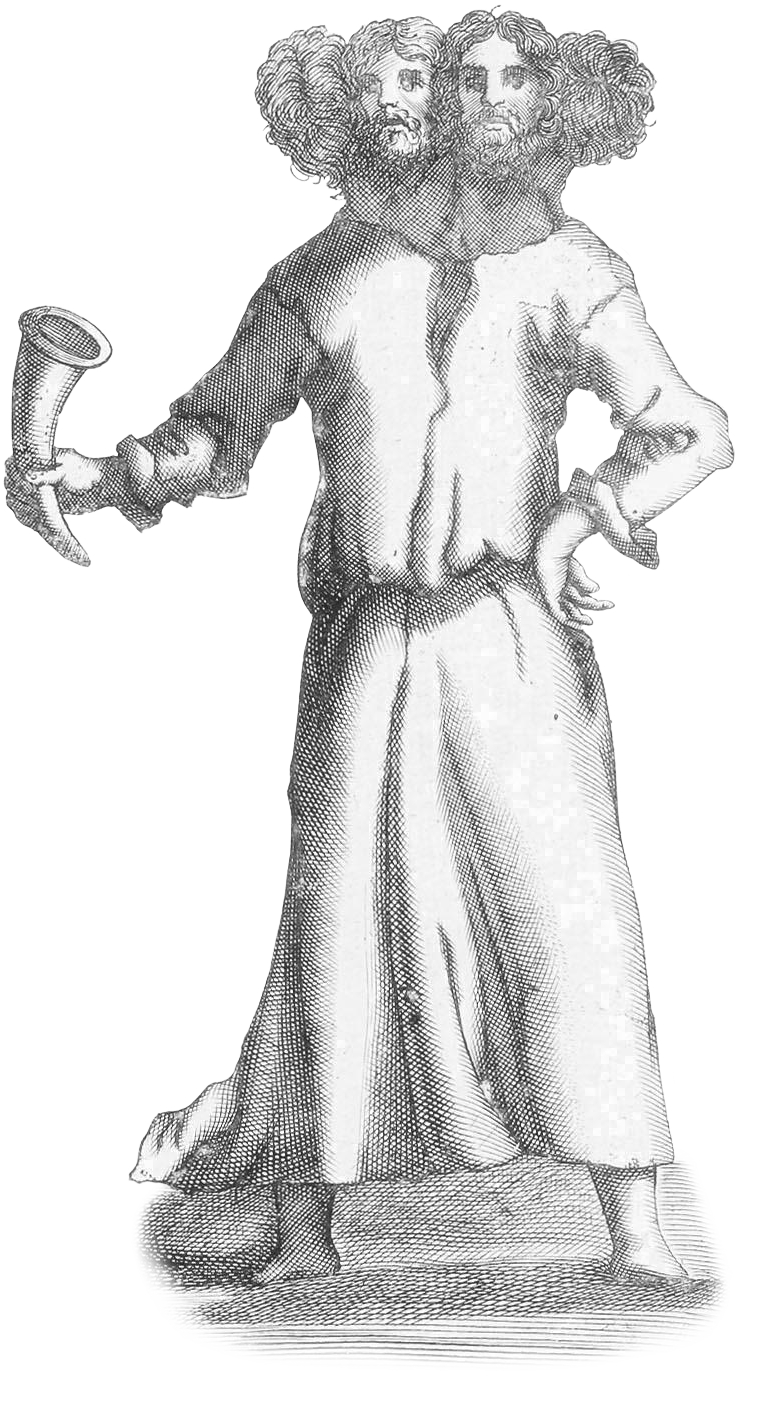
- Svetovit in Britannia Antiqua Illustrata
- Venerated in: Polabian religion
- Major cult centre: Cape Arkona, Rügen
- Weapon: sword
- Artifacts: horn of plenty, saddle, bit, flag
- Animals: white stallion, eagles
- Texts: Chronica Slavorum, Gesta Danorum, Knýtlinga saga

Svetovit, also known as Sventovit and Svantovit amongst other variants, is the god of abundance and war, and the chief god of the Slavic tribe of the Rani, and later of all the Polabian Slavs. His organized cult was located on the island of Rügen, at Cape Arkona, where his main temple was also located. According to the descriptions of medieval chroniclers, the statue representing this god had four heads and held a horn and a sword. Dedicated to the deity were a white horse, a saddle, a bit, a flag, and eagles. Once a year, after the harvest, a large festival was held in his honor. With the help of a horn and a horse belonging to the god, the priests carried out divinations, and at night the god himself rode a horse to fight his enemies. His name can be translated as "Strong Lord" or "Holy Lord". In the past it was often mistakenly believed that the cult of Svetovit originated from St. Vitus. Among scholars of Slavic mythology, Svetovit is often regarded as a Polabian hypostasis of Pan-Slavic god Perun. His cult was destroyed in 1168 by the Danes under Bishop Absalon and King Valdemar the Great.

== Etymology ==
In Latin records, this theonym is notated as Suantouitus, Suantouith, Suantuitho, Szuentevit, Suantevit, Zuantevith, and others, and in Old Icelandic as Svanraviz and Svanteviz.

Scholars agree on the reading of the Latin records; the digraphs ⟨an⟩ and ⟨en⟩ indicate a Slavic nasal vowel. In the first part of the theonym, there is an Old Polabian continuation of the Proto-Slavic adjective *svętъ (with a nasal [e]). At the Old Polabian stage, at least in northern dialects, as a result of the transition of [ę] into [ą] (nasal [a] (Note: Not to be confused with Polish ⟨ą⟩, which corresponds to the nasal [o] in modern times.) (Note: Urbańczyk compares the pronunciation of the Old Polabian [ą] to the pronunciation [a] in the Polish word awans.)), *svętъ passed into Old Polabian dialectal *svąt-. On this basis, the Old Polabian dialectal theonym is reconstructed as *Svątevit.

In English publications god's name is being transcribed as Svantovit (from reconstructed Old Polabian *Svątevit), Sventovit or Svetovit (from hypothetical Common Slavic *Svętovitъ).

The prevailing view in the literature is that *svętъ in Proto-Slavic language meant "strong, mighty", and only under the influence of Christianity did it acquire the religious meaning of "holy, sacred". Such a view was held by Aleksander Brückner, (Note: Brückner believed that the word *svętъ meant the same as the word *jarъ "strong". On this basis he equated the names: Sviatopolk = Yaropolk, Sviatoslav = Jaroslav, and the theonyms Svetovit = Yarovit.) Stanisław Rospond and many others.

Nowadays, however, this view is sometimes criticized and it is suggested that the meaning of "holy, sacred" should be considered original, Proto-Slavic. Against the influence of Christianity on the meaning of the word is contradicted primarily by its etymology: the closest cognates are Lithuanian šventas and Old Prussian swints "holy, sacred", which, like PS *svętъ, are derived from the Proto-Balto-Slavic *śwentas. Also closely related is the Avestan spəṇta "holy, sacred" and Sanskrit śvānta. Also further related are the Proto-Germanic *hunsla "offering, sacrifice", and possibly Thracian *θιντ and Proto-Celtic *penta. The Slavic word and words related to it ultimately come from the Proto-Indo-European root *ḱwen- "to celebrate". Rick Derksen reconstructs PS meaning of *svętъ as "holy, sacred", Wiesław Boryś as "being the object of religious reverence, worship".

In academic literature, the theonym is traditionally divided morphologically as Sveto-vit – in the second part there is supposed to be a suffix -vit (hypothetical PS *-vitъ) meaning "lord, ruler, hero". The suffix is supposed to derive from *vitędzь "warrior, hero" of Germanic etymology. Some researchers, however, have rejected the connection of the suffix with *vitędzь precisely because of the Germanic origin of the word; some scholars have linked the suffix to the word *vitati "to invite, to wish health", or the hypothetical verb *viti. (Note: Aleksandar Loma links this suffix with Old Church Slavonic vŭz-vitǐ, izvitije "prey, plunder", povinǫti "subdue", Bulgarian naviyam "I won", all of which contain the independently unattested verb *viti, which has a Lithuanian cognate of výti "to chase the enemy" and comes from the same stem as *vojь "soldier".) Depending on which original meaning of the word *svętъ a given scholar takes, the theonym is translated, for example, as "Strong hero", "Strong ruler and lord", or "Holy victor", "Holy lord". Some scholars also divide the theonym as Svet-ovit, where the suffix -ovit means "one who has much (of something)", "characterized by (something)", and the theonym Svetovit is supposed to mean "The one with much that is holy".

=== Other propositions ===
Brückner found the interpretation of the name problematic. He eventually suggested a possible connection with the hypothetical Old Polish word świętowity "holy, sacred", but this interpretation was rejected by Stanisław Urbańczyk. The source material, however, confirms the existence of this type of words in Slavic languages, cf. Belarusian dialectal svyatovyy, Russian svyatovyy, Ukrainian *svyatovoy "holy, sacred", also probably Old Polish *świętowa "holy, sacred", all from Slavic *svętovy. (Note: Possibly also Czech svatovití m pl "holy, venerable" ← *svatovit "holy, venerable", if not a neologism (attested since 1856).) If this etymology is correct, the theonym consists of the adjective *svętovy, and the suffix *-itъ(jь).

It has also been proposed that the meaning of the first part of the theonym should be translated, for example, as "world", or "light" (PS *světъ), but this interpretation has been rejected by linguists. A completely incorrect reading is Sviatovid / Svietovid (Polish Światowid) "God seeing the four directions of the world" invented by 19th century Polish Romantics, where the suffix is supposed to be -vid "to see" (cf. Polish widzieć "to see").

== Sources ==
Svetovit is mentioned by three sources: the main information is given by Helmold's Chronica Slavorum and Saxo Grammaticus’s Gesta Danorum; he is also mentioned by Knýtlinga saga. Saxo writes most extensively about Svetovit, his description of this god is the longest known text on the beliefs of the Slavs. Excerpt from Saxo's description:

In the city center there was a flat space, where a temple made of wood could be found, which was very elegantly crafted, worthy of veneration not only because of the magnificence of its decorations, but also because of the divinity of the image placed inside. The outside perimeter of the building gleamed with a well-maintained covering, which consisted of shapes of different things painted in a crude, primitive style. Only one entry door could be seen. However, the temple itself was closed off by two enclosures, of whose walls the outside set was covered by a red roof; the interior, on the other hand, which was supported over four pillars, shone with wall hangings instead of walls, and did not share any structure with the exterior except the roof and a few beams.

In the temple, an enormous statue, which exceeded any type of human body in size, left one stunned, with its four heads and equal number of necks, of which two seemed to look at the chest and another two at the back. And of the two located on the front as well as the two on the back, one seemed to be gazing to the right and the other to the left. They had close-shaved beards and very short hair, such that one could think that the maker had imitated the Rani’s style of doing their hair. In its right hand it held a horn decorated with several types of metal, that the priest who was an expert in their rites would fill each year with pure wine, in order to make predictions about the coming year’s harvest through the state of the liquor itself. On the left there was a bow in the arm turned towards the side. There was a sculpted tunic that fell to its feet, which, made of different types of wood, connected to the knees with a junction that was so invisible that the point of union could only be discovered after a very careful examination. The feet were at ground level, with the base hidden below the floor. Not very far away were some bridles and a chair for the statue, and many emblems of the deity. The admiration for these things was further increased by a sword of an astonishing size, whose scabbard and hilt, in addition to excellent embossed decorations, were also covered in splendid silver.

Every year, every man and woman paid a coin as a donation for the worship of this idol. The idol was also given a third of the loot and the results of plundering, as if they had been attained and taken for his protection. This same god had three hundred horses and the same number of men who served as warriors on them, and all of their earnings, obtained through arms or robbery, were given to the custody of the priest, who, using the profits from these things, would create different types of emblems and various adornmentsfor the temple, and store them in tightly closed chests, in which, in addition to abundant money, a large amount of purple cloth had accumulated, eaten by time. There could also be seen an enormous amount of public and private donations, given by the fervent offerings of those who asked the deity for favors.
This deity also had in many other places other temples, which were governed by priests of a lower rank with less power. In addition to this, it had in its possession its own private horse, which was white, and whose mane and tail hair it was considered a bad omen to cut. Only one priest was allowed to feed it and ride it, so that the use of the divine animal was not seen as less valuable by being more frequent. In the opinion of the Rani, it was believed that Svetovit—that was the name of the idol—waged war against the enemies of his cult on this horse. The most important argument supporting this was that, when the horse remained in the stable the entire night, very often he would appear in the morning covered with sweat and mud, as if, returning from exercising, he had traveled long distances.

— Saxo Grammaticus, Gesta Danorum

== Svetovit and Saint Vitus ==
According to some scholars, the theonym Svetovit allegedly derives from Saint Vitus, because in Slavic languages both names sound very similar. (Note: Cf. modern Slavic languages' calques of Old Polabian *Svątevit and Saint Vitus: Polish Świętowit : Święty Wit, Bulgarian Svetovit : Sveti Vit, Russian Svyatovit : Svyatoy Vit.) Supporters of this theory cite Helmold, who cites the so-called "Corvey legend" in two versions (in the first version, he calls it an "old relation", in the second, he calls it a "vague account") according to which the tribe of the Rani living on the island of Rügen was Christianized in the ninth century, and then abandoned Christianity and idolized Saint Vitus:

For an old relation of our ancestors tells that in times of Ludovicus II (Note: Depending on the version of the legend, this refers to Louis the German, or Louis the Pious.) a group of monks famous for their holiness left Corvey. Hungry for the salvation of the Slavs, they insisted on suffering dangers and death in order to preach the word of God. After passing through many provinces, they arrived at those who were called Rani or Rujani and lived in the middle of the sea. That is the home of error and the seat of idolatry. After faithfully preaching the word of God, they won over the entire island, where they even founded an oratory in honor of Our Lord and Savior Jesus Christ and in memory of Saint Vitus, who is the patron saint of Corvey. Later, the situation having changed with permission from God, the Rani moved away from the faith and, immediately driving out the priests and the Christians, changed religion for superstition. For they worshiped Saint Vitus, who we revere as a martyr and servant of Christ, as a god, setting creatures over the creator. There is no other barbarism under heaven more horrifying to Christians and priests; they only rejoiced in the name o Saint Vitus, to whom they even dedicated a temple and a statue with a very significant cult and they attribute especially to him the primacy of the gods. They ask of him prophetic answers regarding all the provinces of the Slavs, and pay sacrificial tribute annually. Not even the traders who coincidentally arrive at those places can sell or buy anything if they do not first make an offering of some precious object from their wares to the god and only then can they make their goods available to the public at the market. They honor their high priest no less than they would a king. And thus, from the time that they renounced their first faith, this superstition perseveres among the Rani until the present.

— Helmold, Chronica Slavorum

Such a view was expressed by Evelino Gasparini, or Henryk Łowmiański, but Łowmiański rejected the authenticity of the legend. Instead, he proposed a hypothesis according to which the cult of St Vitus was supposed to have spread from Prague to Brenna – from there came Drahomira, the mother of Wenceslaus I, the founder of St. Vitus' Church in Prague – where it was accepted as a deity by tolerant Slavs, and after the fall of Brenna it was supposed to have reached Rügen.

The view of the Christian origin of Svetovit is rejected by most scholars and historians. (Note: "Most scholars, however, did not take note of this rumor [...]") (Note: „On the basis of the above, it appears that the entire story by Helmold and repeated by Saxo is regarded widely by modern historians as fictitious [...]”.) It is generally believed that this legend was invented in the 12th century to justify political claims to Rügen, already known since the mid-11th century. First of all, it is impossible that there was a Christianization of Polabia in the ninth century, let alone of Rügen in the ninth century – the first documents attesting the Christianization of Rügen appear only after the fall of the Slavic Arkona in 1168, although chroniclers of the time were eager to describe the Christianization of any pagans – the Christianization of Rügen is not mentioned by Widukind of Corvey (The Deeds of the Saxons), nor by Adam of Bremen (Gesta Hammaburgensis ecclesiae pontificum). There is also an argument against such borrowing by given names of similar construction, e.g. Milovit, Radovit, Siemovit, etc. It is also unclear why the Slavs would consider an unpopular saint as a chief deity. The cult of St. Vitus itself was transferred to the Polabian region from Prague, not from Corvey.

The origin of this legend is unclear. Helmold mentions a Christianizing mission to Rügen, but makes no mention of a tribute, and the monastery makes no mention of a mission, but mentions the right to collect a tribute from Rügen. The first to mention the loss of Corvey's right to Rügen was Abbot Saracho (d. 1071), but this is probably a later interpolation. The first reliable, albeit indirect, information about the Rügen tribute was given by the Annales Corbeienses, which describe the expedition of Duke Lotar III in 1114 against the Lutici union. The defeated Circipanians tribe admitted that they had once paid tribute in the form of fox skins or coins to St. Vitus in Corvey (where his relics had been located since 836). According to Łowmiański, this confession to paying tribute was a fabrication to appease Lotar's wrath, since there is no evidence whatsoever that the Circipanians paid tribute before that date. According to Roman Zaroff, however, this information is also a forgery; according to Janisław Osięgłowski, the legend originated around 1110-1114 and was started by monks from Corvey who knew the Slavic language and participated in Lotar's war expedition. When they learned about the island and the benefits that could be derived from its possession, the similarity of the words Svetovit and Saint Vitus prompted them to create the legend, Jacek Soszyński claims, however, that the legend may have originated even earlier, but it was not practically applied for the first time until 1114. According to Stanisław Rosik, the information about Svetovit, whose cult prevailed among the Pomeranian Slavs after the fall of Rethra, may have reached Corvey through merchants charged with donations to Svetovit, or returning prisoners of war who were kidnapped by Slavic pirates. The person who translated the theonym was able to translate the first part of the theonym as corresponding to Latin sanctus, but was unable to translate the second part (-vit), which, with the medieval tendency toward etymologization, resulted in a legendary identification.

=== In Serbia ===
Some publications claim that Svetovit was also worshipped in Serbia (and Croatia), as evidenced by the holiday of Vidovdan (literally "St. Vitus Day"). This holiday, which was originally associated with St. Vitus, was forgotten over time and began to regain its popularity in 1818 after the publication of Vuk Karadžić's Srpski rječnik, where Vidovdan is mentioned as the day of the Battle of Kosovo. Since the mid-19th century, with the rise of Serbian romanticism, this holiday among all Serbs began to symbolize the nation's heroism in the fight against the Ottoman Empire. In 1864 the holiday returned to the church calendar, but at that time the holiday was mainly treated as a day to commemorate the battle of Kosovo and the death of Prince Lazar. For this reason, there were even claims in the scholarly literature that Vidovdan is not related to St. Vitus at all.

At the end of the 19th century, in his book Natko Nodilo attributes the cult of Svetovit to all Slavs, whose cult was to be deliberately replaced by a saint with a similar name to facilitate Christianization. Based on this book, Miodrag Popović argues for the pagan origin of the holiday. Popović is later referred to by Mile Nedeljković, according to whom Vidovdan is a festival of the deity Vid, and the Kosovo myth developed alongside the cult of this deity, as well as ethnologists Dušan Bandić and Mila Bosić. Even today, the view of the cult of Svetovit among Serbs and Croats comes up for discussion; his name is often stylized as Svetovid or Vid to make the name similar to toponymy and other proper names (e.g. Vidova Gora), which are supposed to be remnants of his cult. However, the theory of the knowledge of the god Svetovit in the South Slavs cannot be accepted – it is widely believed in the scholarly community that the god Svetovit was known only to the Polabian Slavs and did not have a pan-Slavic range, and the Serbo-Croatian toponymy and proper names refer to St. Vitus (Serbian: Свети Вид, romanized: Sveti Vid).

== Cult ==
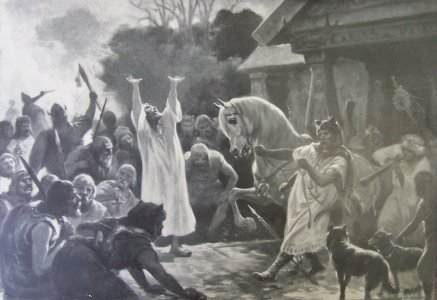
Divination before battle, Józef Ryszkiewicz, 1890

Once a year there was a big feast in honor of the god. The day before, the priest would clean the temple, taking care not to let out any breath inside the temple, so as not to defile the presence of the god with human breath. The feast was held after the harvest. After the crowd gathered in front of the temple, animals were sacrificed and then a feast was held. The next day the crowd gathered in front of the temple and the priest checked the amount of alcohol in the horn situated in the statue of the god – if there was a lack of alcohol poured earlier, it predicted a crop failure and the priest ordered them to make provisions; if there was no lack the priest predicted a good harvest for the next year. Then the priest poured out the liquor from the horn under the statue's feet and poured fresh liquor asking for prosperity for himself and the people. The priest would finish the ritual by taking a large gulp from the horn, then refilling it again and placing it in the statue.

There is also a well known ritual connected with a large round cake seasoned with honey, which the priest would put in front of him and ask the people gathered in front of him if they could see him. When the crowd answered that they could, the priest wished them that they would not be able to see him the following year, which amounted to a wish for a larger harvest.

The priest admonished the people to offer sacrifices to the god to ensure prosperity. The Slavs voluntarily gave one coin a year to Svetovit. The god was also given ⅓ of the captured armor of enemies. Neighboring kings were also said to have made gifts to the deity, such as a Danish king named Swen, probably Sweyn III of Denmark, who offered him a precious cup. Merchants who came to trade on the island of Rügen were taxed in honour of Svetovit.

A white horse was an intrinsic element of the Svetovit cult. The god himself was supposed to ride this horse at night to fight his enemies, which was proved by the fact that in the morning the horse was drowsy and dirty. The horse could only be ridden by a priest in order to not diminish the value of the horse, and pulling a hair from its mane or tail was considered a sin. The horse was also used for divination: the priests set up three rows of spears with the spearheads downwards, where each row of spears was crossed with each other: if the horse crossed these rows of spears with its right foot first, it meant good luck in a planned battle or attack; if with the left first, the battle was called off.

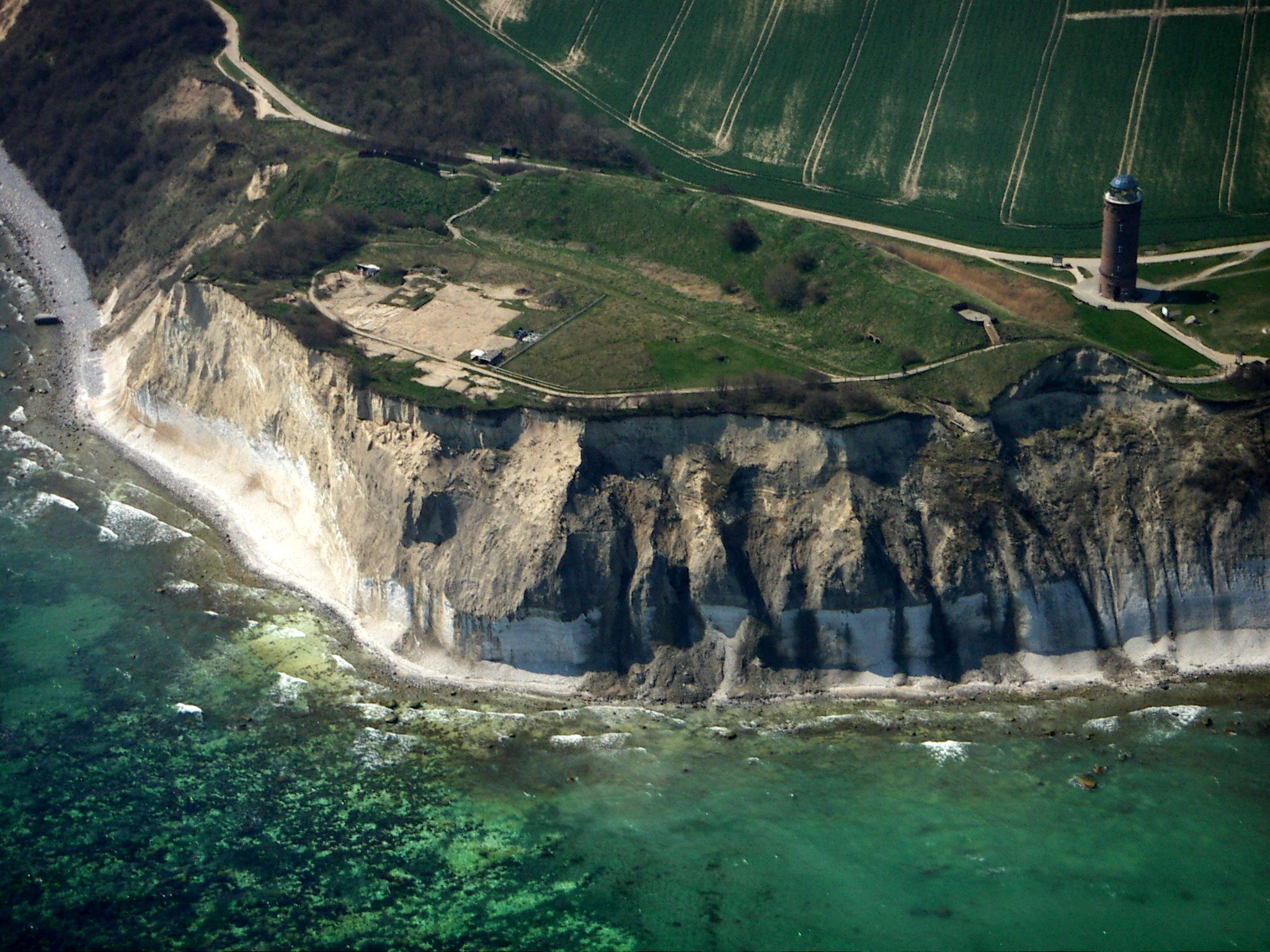
Remains of a fortress at Arkona. Shoreline destruction continues at a rate of 0.3-0.5 m per year.

Saxo states that a flag (Latin: stanitia, cf. Kashubian: stanica "flag, banner, ensign, pennant") and eagles were also dedicated to the god. Saxo does not describe what exactly the eagles were, but they were located on two sides of a flag which was on the gate tower (towards the east) of the only entrance to the gord on Arkona, however, the chronicler describes the flag in more detail: it was supposed to be of large size and a unique color. (Note: It is unclear whether this referred to the colorfulness of the flag or the uncommonness of the color.) The flag was also a kind of emblem of the Rugians, and it was revered as almost divine, being sacred and belonging to a deity. According to the chronicler, the flag gave the people who possessed it the ability to plunder cities, destroy temples or houses without suffering consequences, and to execute judgments. The gate, which had a flag and eagles on it, was probably an altar of sorts. This stall was burned during the siege of Arkona.

The cult of Svetovit officially ended in June 1168 after the capture of Arkona by the Danes led by King Valdemar I and Bishop Absalon.

(Valdemar) caused the antique statue of Svetovit, which is venerated throughout the country of the Slavs, to be taken out and ordered that a rope be placed around its neck and it be dragged among the entire army in view of the Slavs and, once it was reduced to kindling, that it be tossed into the fire. And he destroyed the temple with all of its cultural apparatuses and looted the shrine’s rich treasure. And he ordered them to abandon the error into which they had been born and to accept the worship of the true God (…).

— Helmold, Chronica Slavorum

The fortress where the temple was located was on the island of Rügen, on the northeastern peninsula of Wittow, at the edge of Cape Arkona. The remains of the temple have not survived to modern times, having been swallowed up by the sea. During recent archaeological investigations (20th and 21st centuries), merchant and military objects were found, confirming the high status of the castle, as well as the remains of human sacrifices.

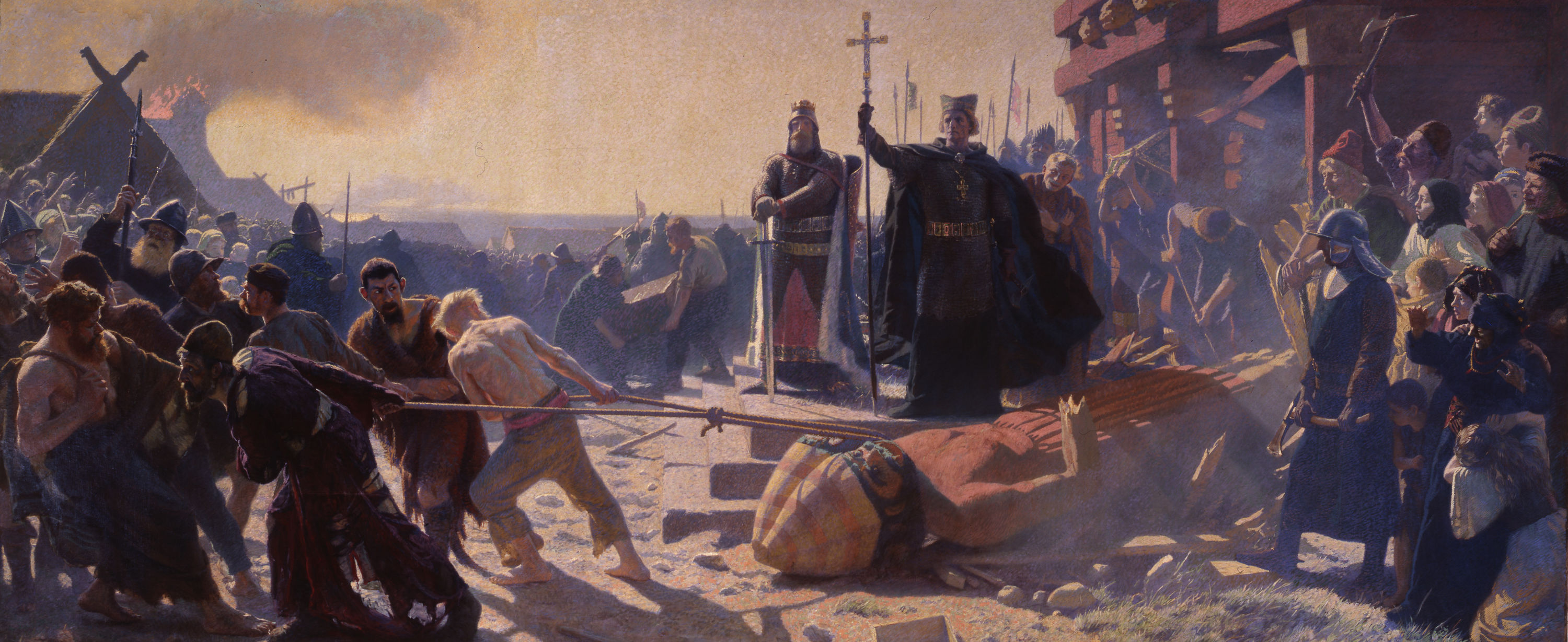
The Taking of Arkona in 1169, King Valdemar and Bishop Absalon, Laurits Tuxen.

== Comparative mythology and interpretations ==
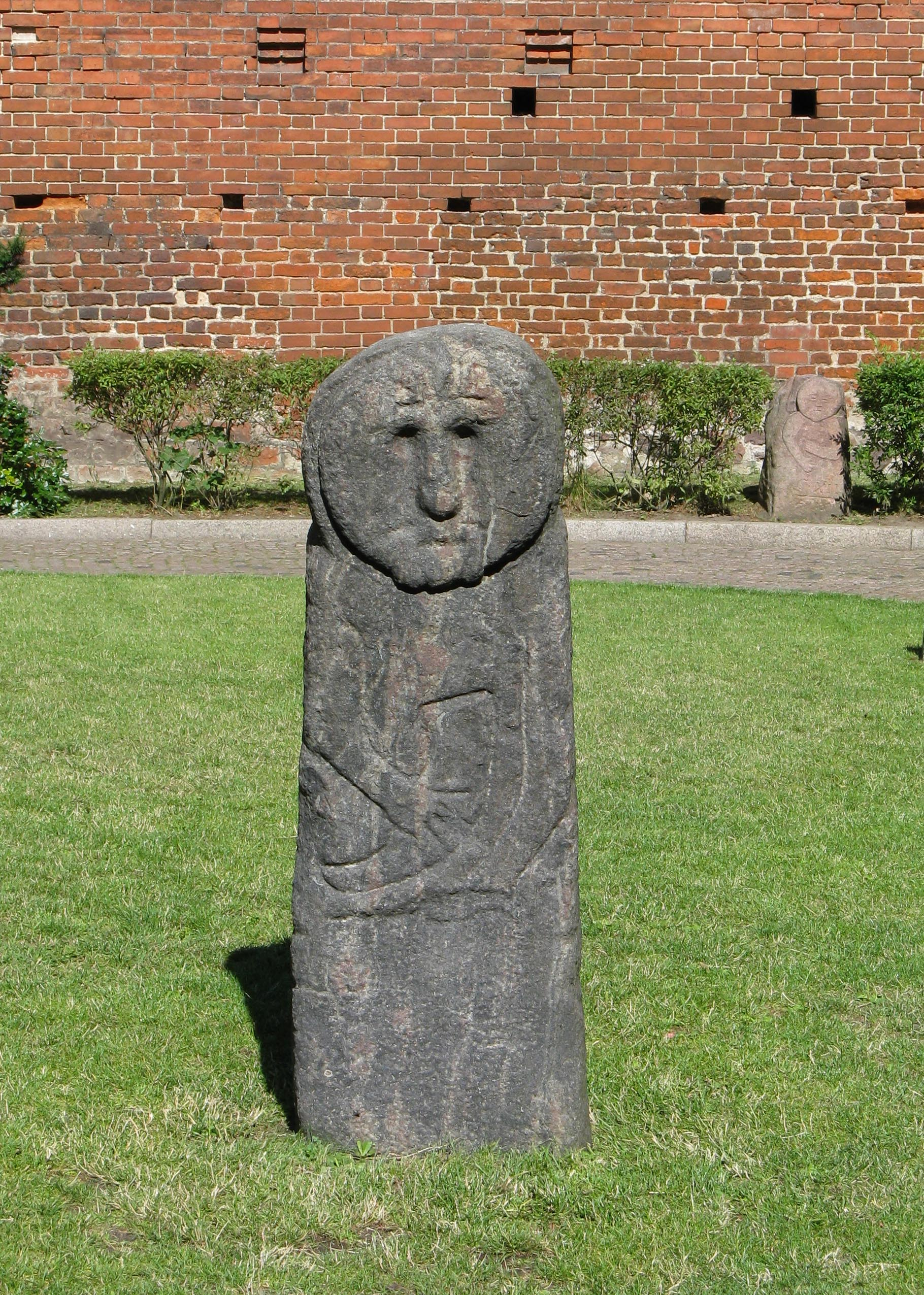
Old Prussian stone baba in the courtyard of the Olsztyn Castle.

Horse riding is present throughout many other Slavic mythologies. Rituals involving round cake are also Pan-Slavic, and documented in Ukraine, Belarus, Herzegovina, and Bulgaria. (Note: In Bulgaria, a priest standing behind a pile of round bread asks people: "Can you see me?", and to an affirmative answer he replies: "May you for the next year not be able to see me quite so much," thus wishing an even greater harvest.) Divination by means of a horse, or hippomancy, was also known to the Germanic peoples (according to Tacitus), the Balts, the Rus and in the Avestrian religion. Not breathing in the temple also appears in Zoroastrianism, where it was done to avoid contaminating the sacred fire. The eagles on either side of the flag are analogous to Polish seals, where a representation of a prince is placed between two eagles, and which were often also on the prince's helmet to show power. The use of flags in a religious context by the Polabian was written about earlier by Thietmar (the flag of Svarozhits in Rethra and the flag of an unknown goddess of the Lutici).

Aleksander Gieysztor made a broad comparative mythology of Svetovit and other Indo-European deities, which led him to consider Svetovit as the chief and thunder god, the Polabian hypostasis, the "mask" of Perun. The four heads of Svetovit correspond to the number 4, which is associated with thunder gods: in the Balts Thursday was associated with Perkun, in the Romans Thursday was called Iovis dies ("Jupiter's day"), and in the Germanic people Donnerstag/Thursday ("Thor's day"). In the Balts, women were not allowed to do certain jobs on Thursdays, and marriages contracted on this day would be happy. In addition, Perkun ruled the four directions of the world and had four faces. The ritual of sacrificing alcohol (Note: According to Gieysztor, importing wine by the Polabians and dedicating it to Svetovit is possible but problematic. For this reason, he believes that the Latin word vinum "wine" used by Saxo can be understood as a synonym for alcohol.) to Svetovit is connected with the function of the chief god: the Vedic Indra drank a lot of soma, which gave him strength, Jupiter was sacrificed a grape, and the Germanic Odin drank the best honey mead. He regards the horn of Svetovit as a symbol of power, compares the ritual of exchanging alcohol to the ritual dedicated to Jupiter in the first century BC described by Marcus Terentius Varro, (Note: "I drink wine new, new from the old disease I cure myself".) wine and the very rallying from the drink is supposed to be common to many Indo-Europeans. Round cakes are of Indo-European origin – in Rome round cakes were called summanalia, which gave rise to the nickname Jupiter Summanus, and round cakes were also used in rituals in India. The association of Svetovit with the harvest is also linked to the festival of Jupiter, epulum Iovis, held on September 13, associated with the end of the harvest. He compares divination predicting success in war by means of a horse and spear to the spears of Mars hidden in his sacrarium in Regia, the movement of which foretold peace or war. The declaration of war itself, however, belonged to Jupiter – his priest performed the ceremony of declaring war, which ended with the throwing of a spear (hasta ferrata) into enemy territory. In addition to Svetovit, the hypostasis of Perun, according to him, is also to be Yarovit and Ruyevit.

Svetovit as a hypostasis of Perun was also considered by Vyacheslav Ivanov and Vladimir Toporov. There was a temple of Perun in Peryn. The statue of this god was in the middle of a circle, four bonfires oriented to the four directions of the world were placed on the edges of the circle, and four additional hearths were placed between them. Each main hearth could serve as an altar dedicated to a different hypostasis of Perun; the eastern hearth had more coal than the others. According to Ivanov and Toporov, this may correspond to the four heads of Svetovit and the four columns in the temple, and the eastern orientation of the temple at Arkona.

Svetovit was also recognized by Radoslav Katičić as the Polabian hypostasis of Perun. He rejected the alleged cult of Svetovid, or Vid in Serbia as unjustified, but regardless of this theory he recognizes that St. Vitus in Serbia replaced the cult of Perun, as indicated by his worship of this saint.

On the other hand, Andrzej Szyjewski considered Svetovit to be the god of vegetation and fertility, who also possessed solar qualities – he was a sun-hero, possessing a white horse. With time he acquired warlike qualities. According to Aleksander Brückner, Svetovit, Triglav, Svarog and Dazhbog are one and the same deity worshipped under different names; Stanisław Urbańczyk believed that Svetovit replaced Svarog, Svarozhits or Perun.

=== Wolin Svetovit ===
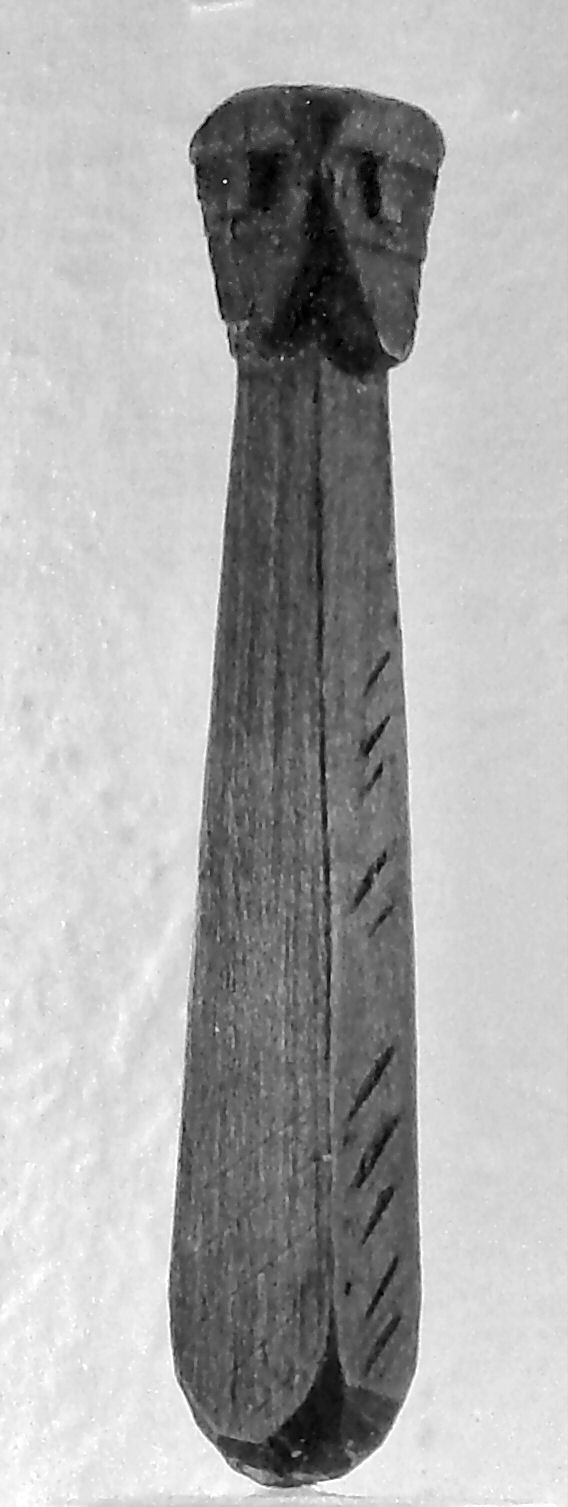
Wolin Svetovit

Scholars have also linked to Svetovit a figurine, the so-called Wolin Svetovit, found on the island of Wolin, on which four faces are carved looking in four directions. The figurine is 9.3 centimetres (3.7 in) tall and was found in a house, which was located near a building interpreted as a probable temple. It is dated to the second half of the 9th century.

=== Zbruch idol ===
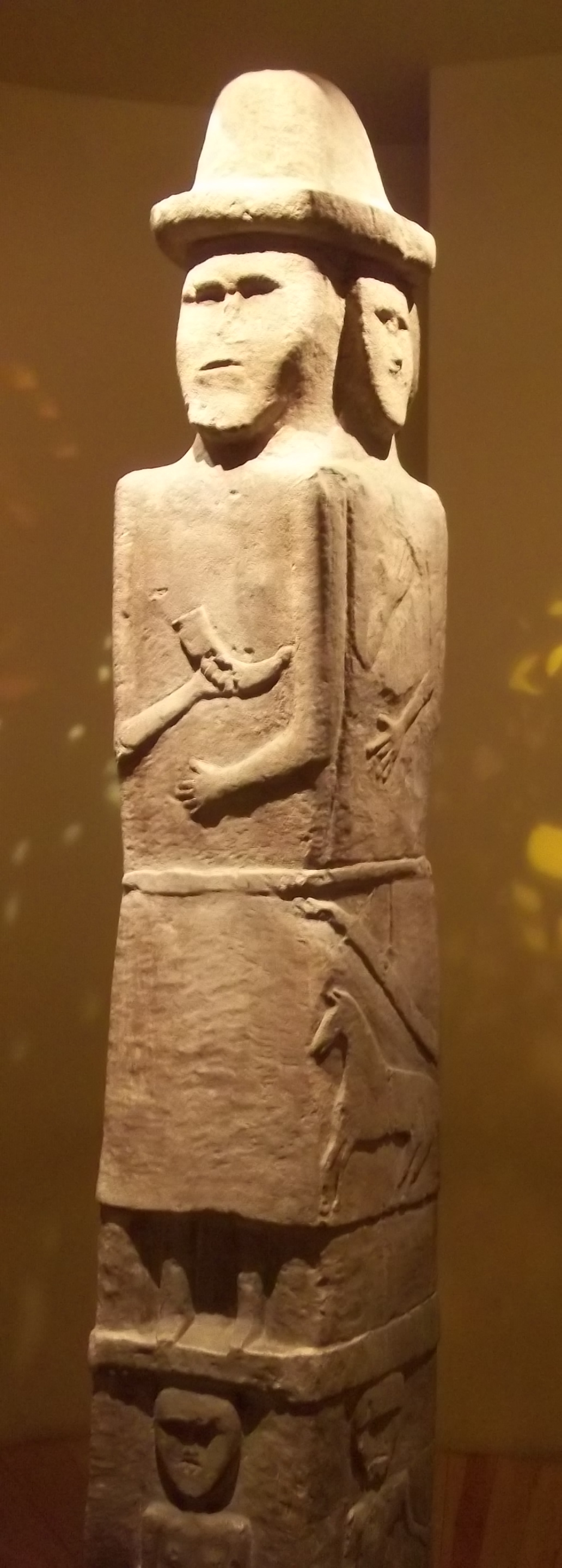
Zbruch idol

Some scholars see an analogy to Svetovit in an idol from Zbruch, the so-called Sviatovid. This statue was found in 1848 from the bottom of the Zbruch River, a tributary of the Dniester. It is a quadrangular limestone pillar, generally dated to the 9th-10th centuries. On the top are four faces facing the four directions of the world. Below, the four sides are covered with reliefs, which are often interpreted as specific deities, which are divided into three levels, which are sometimes interpreted as a cosmological division. However, there are disagreements about the interpretation of the statue, as well as divergent views about its dating, the very belonging to Slavic culture is also subject to criticism.

== In archeology ==
=== In Altenkirchen ===
In the church in Altenkirchen (10 kilometres (6.2 mi) from Arkona), in the 13th-century wall of the sacristy, there is a granite slab measuring 1.19 × 1.68 m depicting a man with a moustache, wearing a cap and a long robe, holding a large horn. The slab is dated to the 10th-11th centuries, although it was not set into the wall until the 13th century or later; according to David Chytraeus, the stone was already there in 1586 and was called Jaromirstein ("Jaromir's stone"). In the 18th century the slab was surrounded by the black painted inscription Sanctus Vitus oder Svantevit ("St. Vitus or Svantevit"), nowadays almost completely erased. Chytraeus, following a local legend, believed the slab to be a representation of Svetovit – a belief that persisted in Rügen folk tradition until the 19th century.

Some scholars believed that the slab was, for example, a reused tombstone of some Christian, such as Jaromir's brother, Tetzlav. However, this is considered unlikely nowadays: the lack of Christian symbolism, the depreciative position (lying down, head down), and the horn and mustache, which were attributes of the god, indicate that this slab depicts Svetovit.

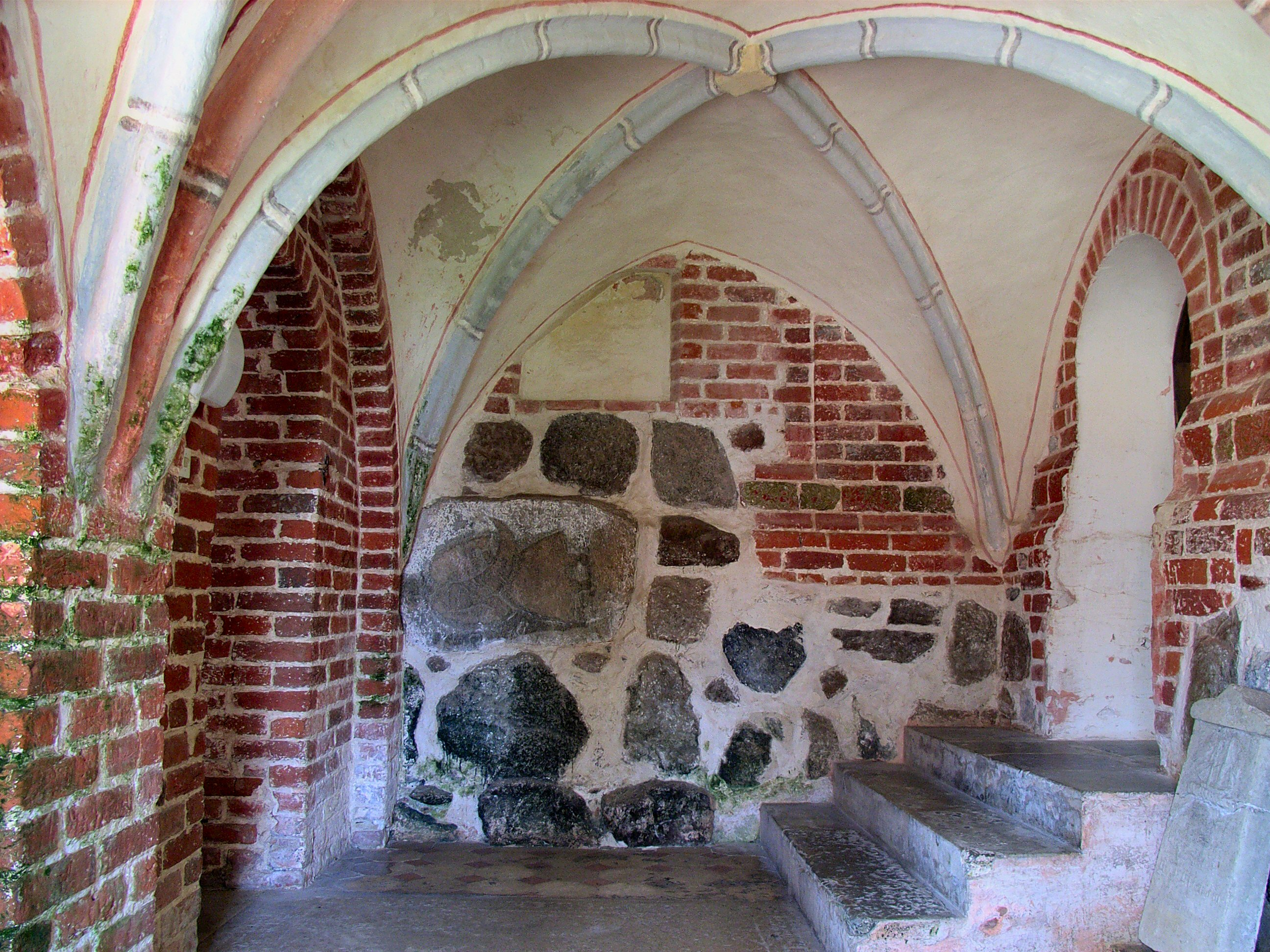

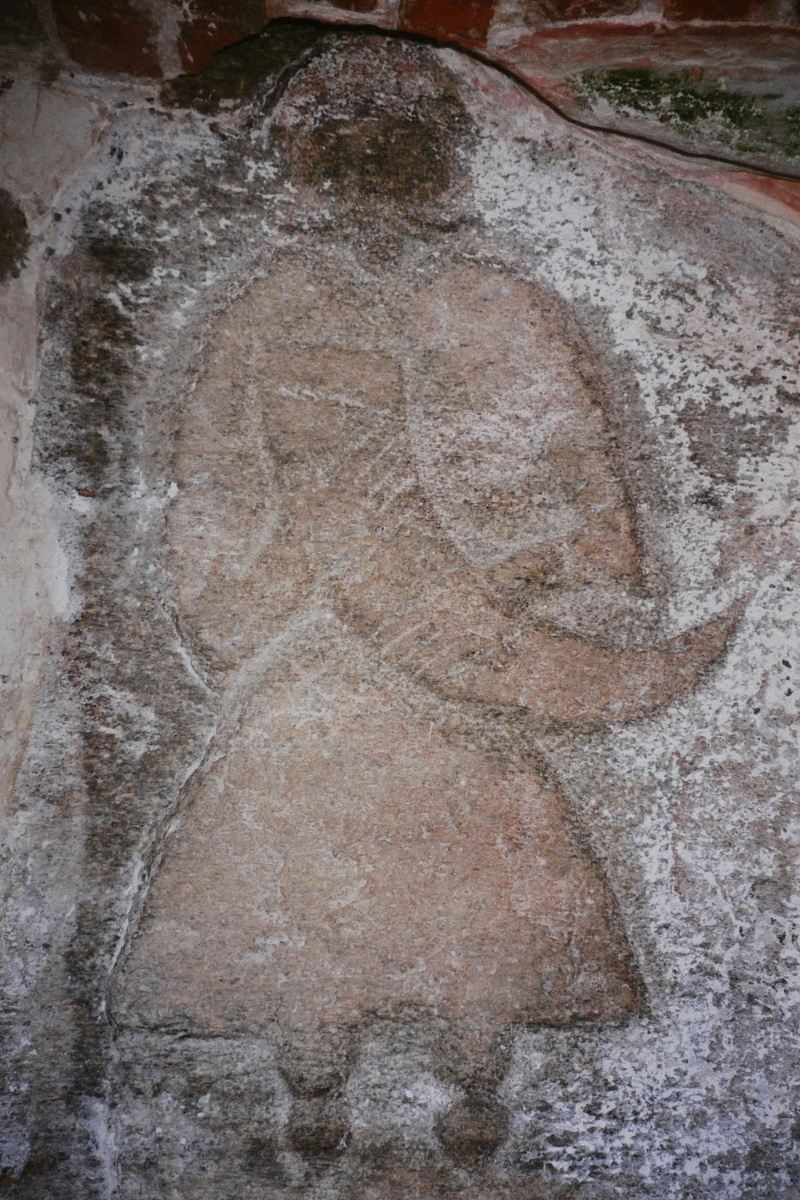

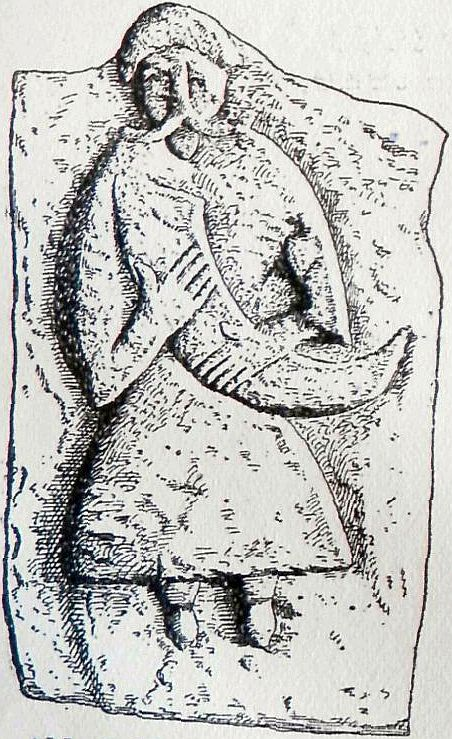

=== In Bergen ===
In the context of Svetovit there is also a similar sized granite slab built into the outer wall of St Mary's Church in Bergen auf Rügen. The slab carves a figure (the so-called Monk) with folded arms on his chest in which he holds a cross. However, the cross is most likely located in place of a horn that had been carved earlier, analogous to the one in the Altenkirchen bas-relief.

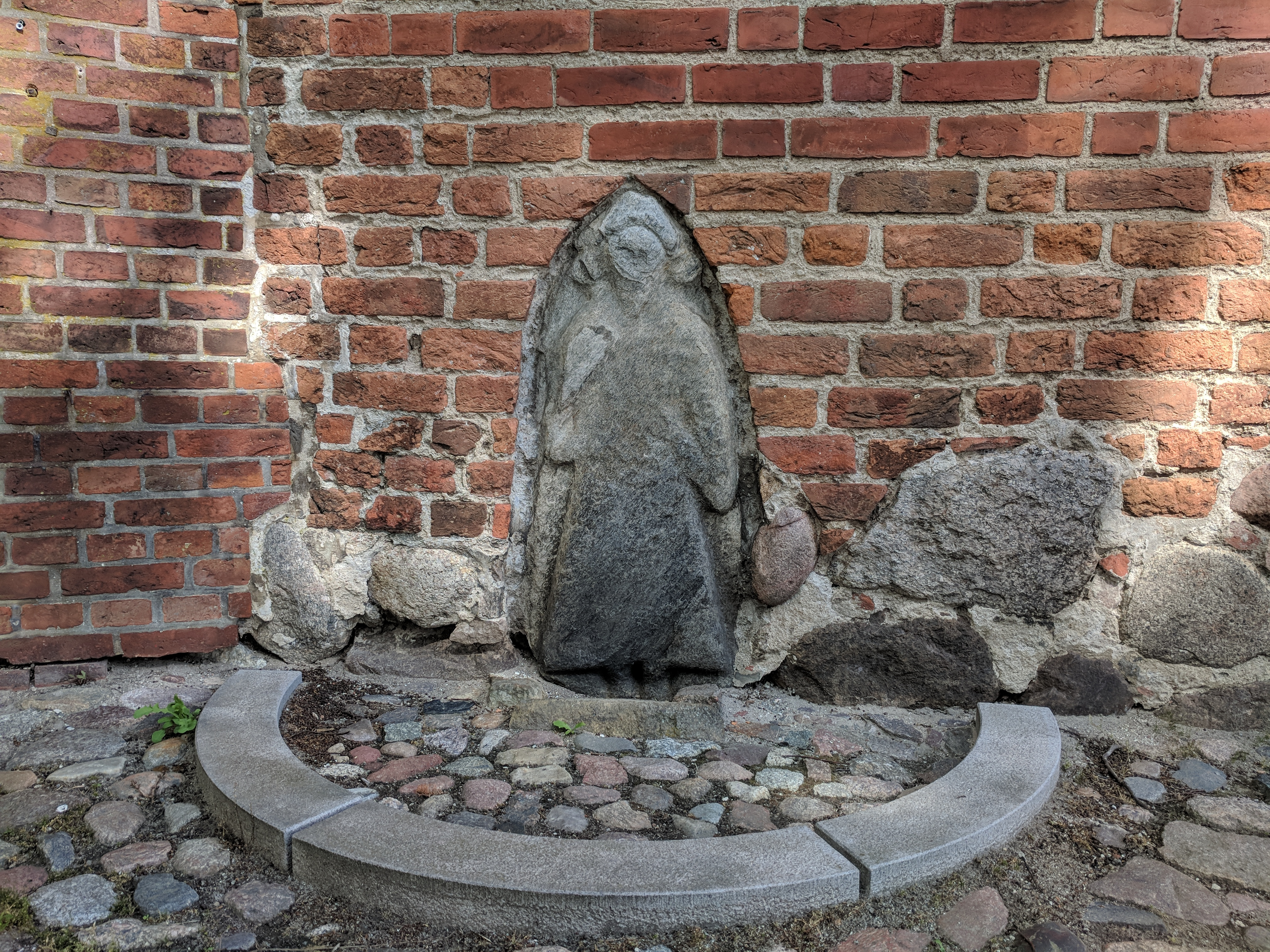

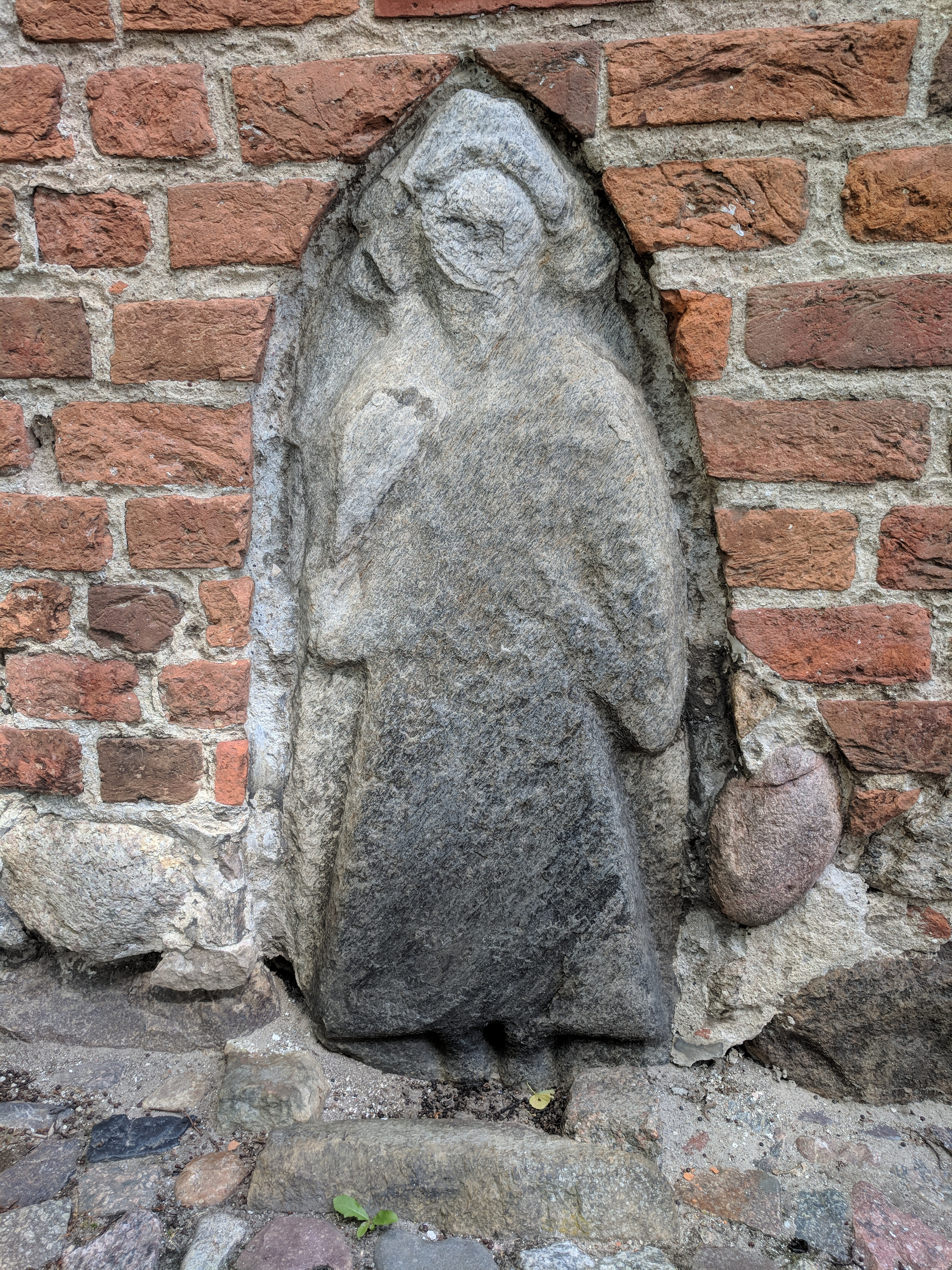

== In Rodnovery ==
Nowadays there are religious associations referring to the ancient religion of the Slavs. The community that refers to the cult of Svetovit is Native Polish Church. Members of this religious association acknowledge the existence of the supreme god (henotheism), which is Svetovit. In this context, this community refers to the words of Helmold and Procopius according to which the Slavs knew the concept of the supreme god.

== In art ==
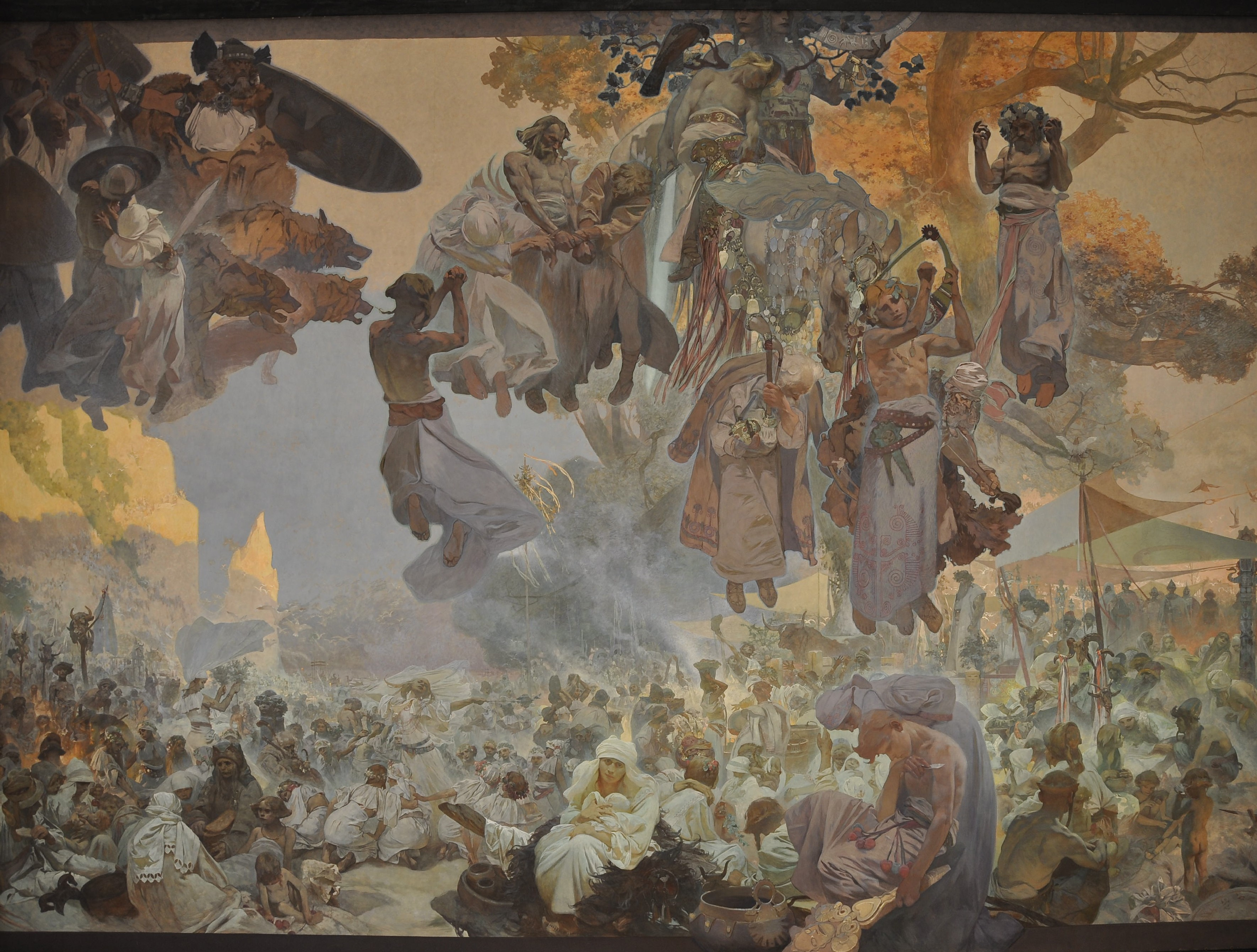
The Celebration of Svantovit, Alphonse Mucha, 1912

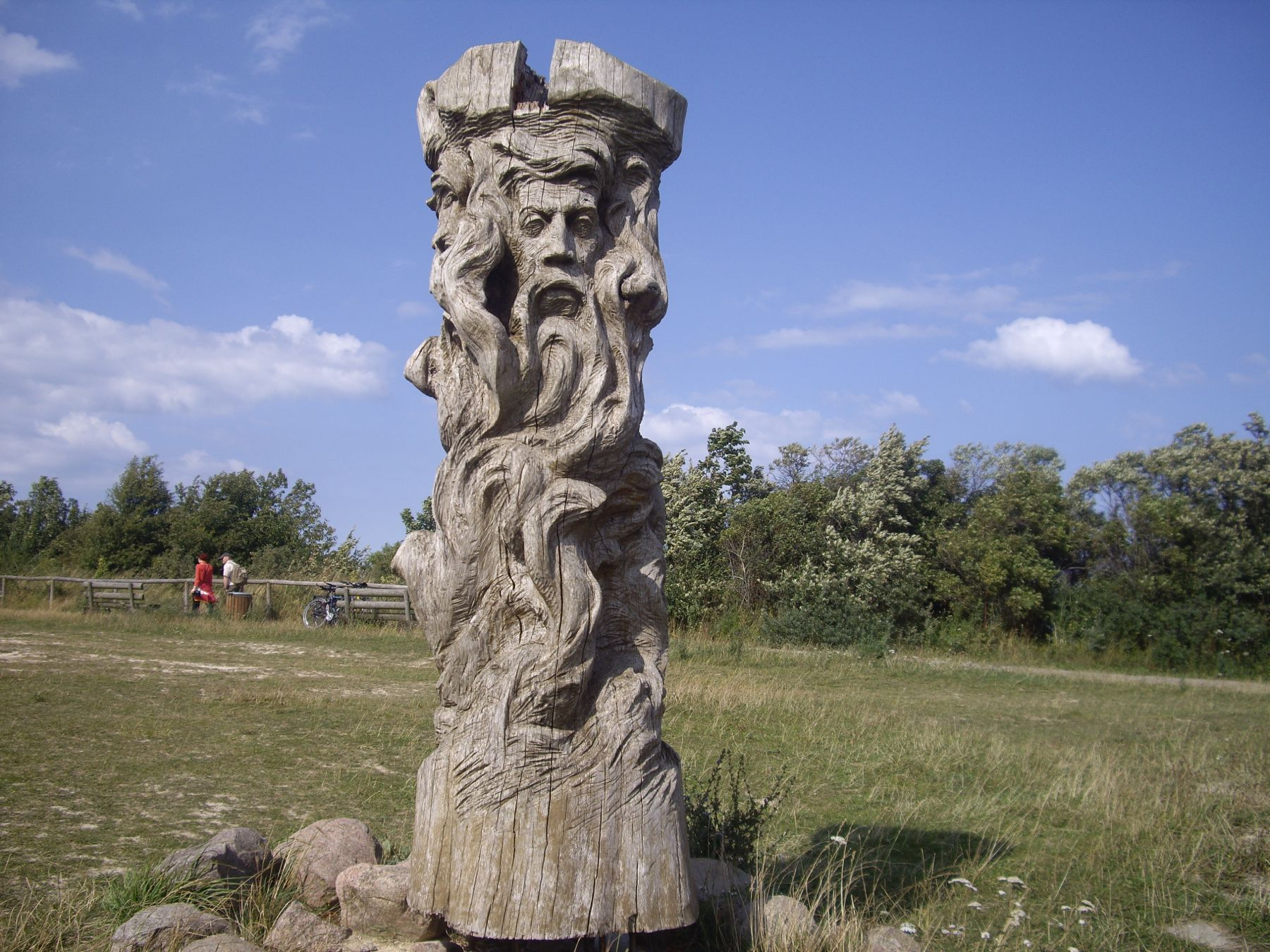
Statue of Svetovit on Arkona by Marius Grusas

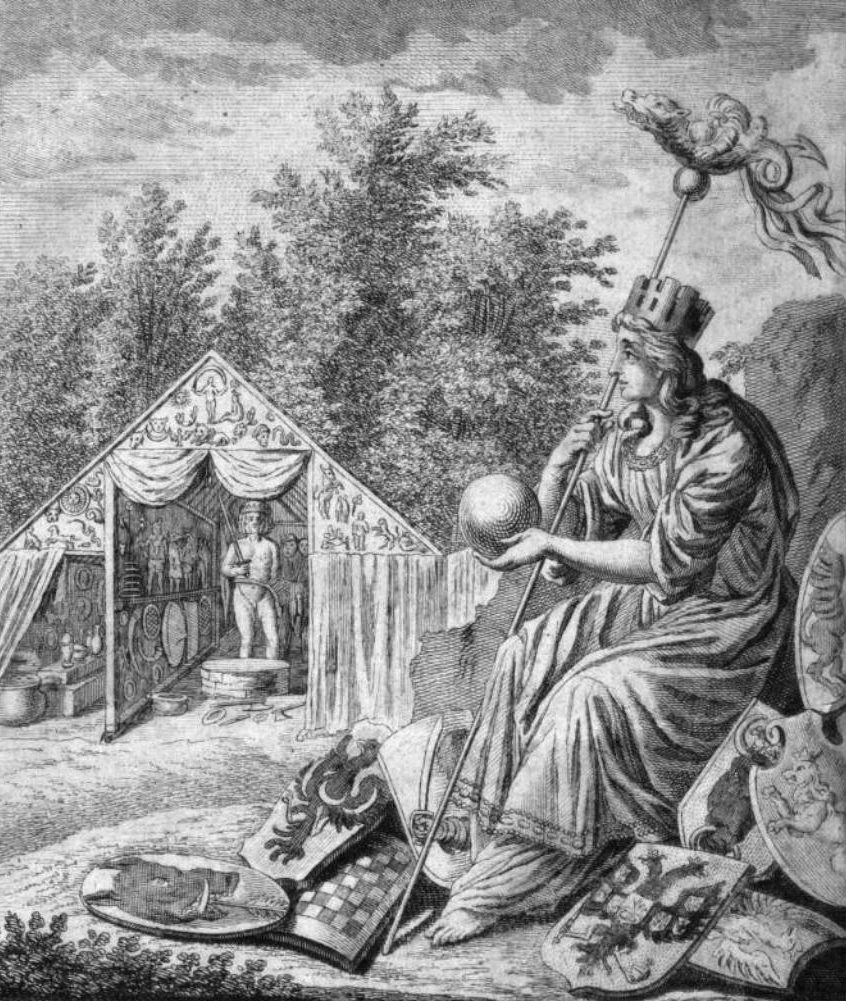
Svetovit in Fortsetzung der Algemeinen Welthistorie... by Ludwig Albrecht Gebhardieg
- Cover art for Polish extreme metal band Behemoth's 1995 debut album Sventevith (Storming Near the Baltic) features a depiction of Svetovit created by French artist David Thiérrée (credited as DarkArts).

== Bibliography ==
- Alvarez-Pedroza, Juan Antonio (2021). Sources of Slavic Pre-Christian Religion. Leiden: Koninklijke Brill. ISBN 978-90-04-44138-5.
- Banaszkiewicz, Jacek (2018). "Czym była i jak została zniszczona chorągiew Świętowita (Saxo Grammaticus, Gesta Danorum, XIV, 39, 14–28)". W stronę rytuałów i Galla Anonima (1 ed.). Kraków: Avalon. pp. 133–153. ISBN 978-83-7730-356-6.
- Brückner, Aleksander (1985). Urbańczyk, Stanisław (ed.). Mitologia słowiańska (in Polish). Warsaw: Państwowe Wydawnictwo Naukowe. ISBN 8301062452.
- Gasparini, Evelini (1973). Il matriarcato slavo. Antropologia culturale dei protoslavi (in Italian). Florence.
- Gieysztor, Aleksander (2006). Mitologia Słowian (in Polish). Warsaw: Wydawnictwa Uniwersytetu Warszawskiego. ISBN 978-83-235-0234-0.
- Ivanov, Vyacheslav; Toporov, Vladimir (1974). Исследования в области славянских древностей: Лексические и фразеологические вопросы реконструкции текстов (in Russian). Moscow: Nauka.
- Ivanov, Vyacheslav; Toporov, Vladimir (1980). "Славянская мифология". In Tokarev, Sergei (ed.). Мифы народов мира: Энциклопедия (in Russian). Vol. 2. Moscow: Большая российская энциклопедия. pp. 450–456.
- Jacek, Banaszkiewicz (2018). "Czym była i jak została zniszczona chorągiew Świętowita (Saxo Grammaticus, Gesta Danorum, XIV, 39, 14–28)". W stronę rytuałów i Galla Anonima (in Polish) (I ed.). Kraków: Avalon. pp. 133–153. ISBN 978-83-7730-356-6.
- Katičić, Radoslav (2010). "Vidova gora in sveti Vid". Studia mythologica Slavica (in Croatian). 13: 15–32. doi:10.3986/sms.v13i0.1637. ISSN 1581-128X.
- Loma, Aleksandar (2002). Prakosovo. Slovenski i indoevropski koreni srpske epike (in Serbian). Belgrade.
- Łowmiański, Henryk (1979). Religia Słowian i jej upadek, w. VI-XII (in Polish). Warszawa: Państwowe Wydawnictwo Naukowe. ISBN 83-01-00033-3.
- Łuczyński, Michał (2020). Bogowie dawnych Słowian. Studium onomastyczne (in Polish). Kielce: Kieleckie Towarzystwo Naukowe. ISBN 978-83-60777-83-1.
- Marković, Miodrag (2007). "Култ светог Вита (Вида) код Срба у средњем веку". Зограф: часопис за средњовековну уметност (in Serbian). 31. Belgrad: Филозофски факултет Институт за историју уметности: 35–50. ISSN 0350-1361.
- Niederle, Lubor (1924). Slovanské starožitnosti (in Czech). Vol. 1: Oddíl kulturní (2 ed.). Prague.
- Osięgłowski, Janisław (1967). "Początki słowiańskiej Rugii do roku 1168 (Zagadnienia etniczne i polityczne)". Materiały Zachodniopomorskie (in Polish). 13: 239–287.
- Rosik, Stanisław (2020). The Slavic Religion in the Light of 11th- and 12th-Century German Chronicles (Thietmar of Merseburg, Adam of Bremen, Helmold of Bosau): Studies on the Christian Interpretation of pre-Christian Cults and Beliefs in the Middle Ages. Leiden: Brill. ISBN 9789004331488.
- Rospond, Stanisław (1983). Słowiańskie nazwy miejscowe z sufiksem -jь (in Polish). Wrocław.
- Słupecki, Leszek Paweł (1993). "Słowiańskie posągi bóstw". Kwartalnik Historii Kultury Materialnej. 41. Institute of Archeology and Ethnology of the Polish Academy of Sciences: 33–69. ISSN 0023-5881.
- Soszyński, Jacek (1984). "Święty Wit a Świętowit Rugijski. Z dziejów legendy". Przegląd Humanistyczny (in Polish). 28 (9/10): 133–139.
- Strzelczyk, Jerzy (1998). Mity, podania i wierzenia dawnych Słowian (in Polish). Poznań: Dom Wydawniczy Rebis. ISBN 83-7120-688-7.
- Szczepanik, Paweł (2020). Rzeczywistość mityczna Słowian północno-zachodnich i jej materialne wyobrażenia (in Polish). Toruń: The Nicolaus Copernicus University Press. ISBN 978-83-231-4349-9.
- Szyjewski, Andrzej (2003). Religia Słowian (in Polish). Kraków: Wydawnictwo WAM. ISBN 83-7318-205-5.
- Urbańczyk, Stanisław (1991). Dawni Słowianie. Wiara i kult (in Polish). Wrocław: Ossolineum.
- Zaroff, Roman (2019). "Rugian Slavic God Sventovit – One More Time". Studia mythologica Slavica. 22: 37–54. doi:10.3986/SMS20192202. ISSN 1581-128X. S2CID 203280509.

Dictionaries

- Brückner, Aleksander (1927). "święty". Słownik etymologiczny języka polskiego. Krakowska Spółka Wydawnicza.
- Boryś, Wiesław (2005). "święty". Słownik etymologiczny języka polskiego. Kraków: Wydawnictwo Literackie. p. 623. ISBN 978-83-08-04191-8.
- Derksen, Rick (2008). Etymological Dictionary of the Slavic Inherited Lexicon. Leiden: Brill. ISBN 978-90-04-15504-6.
- Derksen, Rick (2015). Etymological Dictionary of the Baltic Inherited Lexicon. Leiden: Brill. ISBN 978-90-04-27898-1.
- Kroonen, Guus (2013). Etymological Dictionary of Proto-Germanic. Leiden: Brill. ISBN 978-90-04-18340-7.
- Max Vasmer (1986). "свято́й". Этимологический словарь русского языка (in Russian). Vol. 3 (2 ed.). Moscow: Progress. p. 569.
- Trepczyk, Jan (1994). Treder, Jerzy (ed.). Słownik polsko-kaszubski. Zrzeszenie Kaszubsko-Pomorskie. ISBN 8385011730.
- Vasmer, Max (1986). "свято́й". Этимологический словарь русского языка (in Russian). Vol. 3. Translated by Trubachyov, Oleg (2 ed.). Moscow: Progress. p. 569.
