= Svarozhits =

Slavic god of fire

- Fire (East Slavs); God of protection and war (Polabian Slavs)
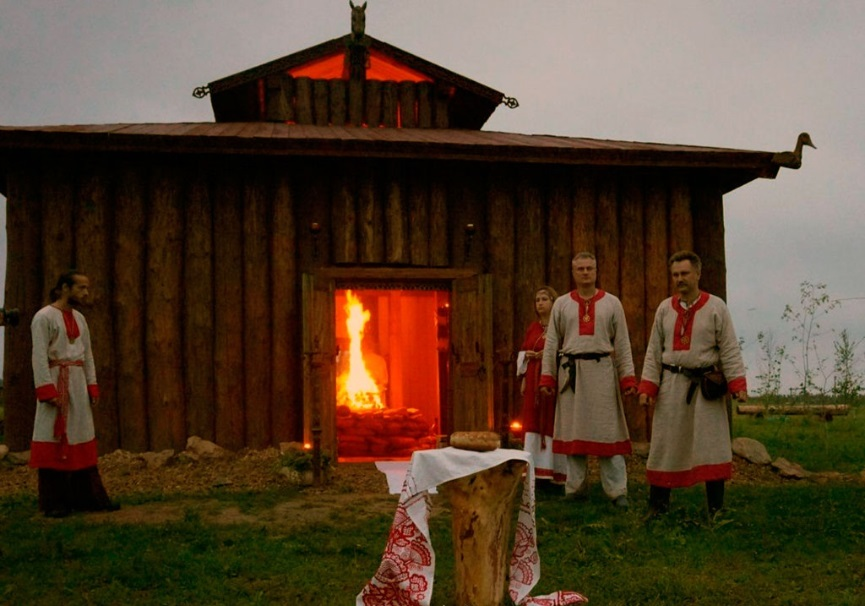
- Modern Slavic Rodnover temple of fire-Svarozhits in Krasotinka, Kaluga Oblast, Russia (Kupala 2015 celebration)
- Other names: Svarozhich
- Major cult center: Rethra
- Animals: Boar?
- Gender: Male
- Region: Europe
- Ethnic group: Slavs

Genealogy
- Parents: Svarog (father)
- Siblings: Dazhbog?

Equivalents
- Christian: Saint Maurice?
- Hindu: Agni

Svarozhits (Note: Scientific transliteration: Svarožic, IPA: [ˈsvarɔːʒiʦ]) (Latin: Zuarasiz, Zuarasici, Old East Slavic: Сварожиць, Russian: Сваро́жич, Сваро́жиц), Svarozhich (Old East Slavic: Сварожичь, Russian: Сварожич) is a Slavic god of fire, son of Svarog. One of the few Pan-Slavic gods, he is most likely identical with Radegast or its regional variant; it is also but much less often identified with Dazhbog.

== Etymology ==
The theonym Svarozhits comes from the theonym Svarog with the suffix –its, –ich. (Note: In Slavic languages g sound is replaced by ž sound in derivative and diminutive words. E.g.: Russian: нога́ (nogá) "leg" → ножка (nóžka) "small leg" Polish: bóg "god" → nabożeństwo "devotion" Serbo-Croatian: bog "god" → Božić "Christmas") According to most scholars, Svarog is related to the word svar "quarrel", svariti "to quarrel, argue", and cognate words are Old English andswaru (→ English swear), Old Norse sverja "to swear", or Sanskrit svarati (स्वरति) "to sing", "to sound", "to praise". An affinity has also been suggested with Old High German gi-swerc "storm clouds", Old English sweorc "darkness, cloud, fog", Dutch zwerk "cloud, cloudy sky", and Indian svárgas "heaven". It has also been suggested that Svarog may be a borrowing from Indo-Aryan languages, but the Slavs and Indo-Aryans were separated by too much space for them to have direct contact.

The suffix -its, -ich (Proto-Slavic *-itj, *-iťь) is generally considered a patronymic suffix, i.e. Svarozhits literally means "son of Svarog" (compare Polish pan "master" → panicz "son of master"). Some scholars, however, believe that the suffix here serves a diminutive function, and Svarozhits means "young, little Svarog", just as Serbo-Croatian Djurdjić is not "son of Djurdjo", but "little Djurdjo", or surviving up to the 18th century, Polabian büg and büzäc. Aleksander Brückner refers to Lithuanian prayers where the diminutive form dievaite is used instead of dieve (e.g. Perkune dievaite).

== Sources ==
=== Polabian Slavs ===
Svarozhits first appears in a text concerning the Polabian Slavs. The Christian monk Bruno of Querfurt, in a letter to king Henry II in 1008, writes to end his alliance with the pagan Veleti, make peace with Bolesław I the Brave, and resume Christianization missions among the Slavs:

As one who has been saved by grace of the king, it behoves me to say thus: “Is it right to persecute a Christian and be the friend of a pagan people? What is this alliance of Christ and Belial? What is this comparison between the light and the shadows? How can Svarožic, the devil, and your and our chief of the saints, Maurice, stand united? To which front do the Sacred Lance and the devilish banners, which feed on human blood, march side by side? Would it not be better to retain the loyalty of a man whose assistance and counsel can be received as a tribute and convert a pagan people to Christianity? How I would like to have not as an enemy but as an ally the man of whom I speak, the old man Boleslav!” Perhaps you shall respond: "I wish it".

Latin original text
Vt autem salua gratia regis ita loqui liceat: bonumne est persequi christianum et habere in amicitia populum paganum? Quae conuentio Christi ad Belial? quae comparatio luci ad tenebras? quomodo conueniunt Zuarasiz diabolus, et dux sanctorum uester et noster Mauritius? qua fronte coeunt Sacra Lancea et, qui pascuntur humano sanguine, diabolica uexilla? Non credis peccatum, o rex, quando christianum caput, quod nefas est dictu, immolatur sub daemonum uexillo? Nonne melius esset talem hominem habere fidelem, cuius auxilio et consilio tributum accipere et sacrum, christianissimum facere de populo pagano posses? O quam uellem non hostem, sed habere fidelem, de quo dico, seniorem Boleszlauum! Respondebis forsitan: uolo.

Henry II continued his alliance with the Veleti despite criticism from the clergy. For this reason, around 1018, the bishop and chronicler Thietmar of Merseburg, while criticizing the alliance with the pagans, briefly describes their religion in his Chronicle:

In the land of the Redarii there is a city called Riedegost (Rethra), which has three corners and one door in each wall and which is surrounded on all sides by a great forest which is untouched and venerated by the local people. Two of its doors are open for all to enter. The third, which faces east and is the smallest, opens onto a path leading to a nearby lake which has a dreadful appearance. In the city there is no more than one temple skilfully made of wood and supported on a foundation made from the horns of different types of animals. Its outer walls are adorned by admirably carved images of gods and goddesses; inside, there stand gods made by the hand of man, each with their name inscribed, dressed in helmets and armour, with a terrible appearance; the most important of them is called Svarožic and he is honoured and worshipped by all the pagans above all else. The banners of these gods never move from that place unless they are needed for a military campaign and, even then, only by foot soldiers.

Latin original text
Est urbs quaedam in pago Riedirierun, Riedegost nominetricornis, actres in se continens portas, quam undique silua ab incolis intacta et uenerabilis circumdat magna. Duae eiusdem portae cunctis introeuntibus patent; tercia, quae orientem respicit et minima est, tramitem ad mare iuxta positum et uisu nimis horribile monstrat. In eadem est nil nisi fanum de ligno artificiose compositum, quod pro basibus diuersarum sustentatur cornibus bestiarum. Huius parietes uariae deorum dearumque imagines mirifice insculptae, ut cernentibus uidetur, exterius ornant; interius autem dii stant manu facti, singulis nominibus insculptis, galeis atque loricis terribiliter uestiti, quorum primus Zuarasici dicitur, et pre caeteris a cunctis gentilibus honoratur et colitur. Vexilla quoque eorum nisi ad expeditionis necessaria, et tunc per pedites, hinc nullatenus mouentur.

The boar that emerges from the lake near Radogoszcz later in the Chronicle may be related to Svarozhits. The boar in European cultures is often associated with fire and the sun.

Another error has been handed down since ancient times, to wit, when they are threatened by the cruel misfortune of war, a great boar with white tusks and glistening with foam emerges from the lake and, wallowing in the mire with terrible agitation, shows itself to many witnesses..

Latin original text
Testatur idem antiquitas errore delusa uario, si quando his seua longae rebellionis assperitas immineat, ut e mari predicto aper magnus et candido dente e spumis lucescente exeat, seque in uolutabro delectatum terribili quassatione multis ostendat.

=== East Slavs ===
Svarozhits also appears in the Eastern Slavs in a homiletic work from the 12th century Sermon by One Who Loves Christ: "to the fire they pray, calling it Svarozhich", and in Sermon by the Holy Father Saint John Chrysostom:

Men who have forgotten the fear of God from neglect by renouncing baptism, approach idols and start to make sacrifices to the thunder and lightning, the sun and moon, and others, to Perun, Khors, the Vily and Mokosh, to vampires and the Beregyni, whom they call three times nine sisters. And others believe in Svarožic and Artemid, to whom ignorant men pray.

Ibn Rustah's work Book of Precious Gems may also refer to Svarozhits: "They are all fire worshippers and the majority sow millet.When harvest time arrives, they collect the millet grain onto a shovel, raise it towards the sky and say: “Oh Lord, you are the one who provides for us and we have none left". However, the term "fire worshippers" found in Arabic sources does not always refer to fire as a deity, but is an Arabic term for idolatry.

=== South Slavic folklore ===
In Slovenian Styria, a demon named Švaržič (Shvarzhich) was known, which proves the cult of Svarozhits among the South Slavs. In 1952, Croatian ethnomusicologist Zvonko Lovrenčević wrote down a folk song from the village of Ciglena near Bjelovar, which was presented by Kate Kuntin (born 1868). The song was sung at Christmas in her family until 1980 only at home, never in church:

Moj božiću Svarožiću, lunaj le, lunaj le! Ti pohodi naše dvore, lunaj le, lunaj le! Naše dvore i obore, lunaj le, lunaj le!	My little Svarozhich, lunay le, lunay le! You visit our court, lunay le, lunay le! Our court and stables, lunay le, lunay le!

The song was also known to Ivana Brlić-Mažuranić, who already in 1916 placed it, in a form modified by her (Moj božiću Svarožiću, zlatno sunce, bijeli svijet! "My little Svarozhich, golden sun, white world!"), in her fable Kako je Potjeh tražio istinu. (Note: This tale was translated into English as How Quest sought the Truth as part of the book Croatian Tales of Long Ago. The translator gave the name of "All-Rosy" to the character, and translated the verses as "Little lord All-Rosy bright./ Bring golden Sun to give us light; / Show thyself, All-Rosy bright,/ Loora-la, Loora-la lay!".)

=== Proper names ===
The village of Verače is Slovenia was also called Tbaraschitzberg or Svarozhits Hill (Slovene: Svarozhichev hrib) in archival sources, but only since 1480. Torek near Senovo was called Twaroch in 1309.

== Interpretations ==
Svarozhits is interpreted as the god of fire. In Indo-European mythologies, there is a special fire deity who is endowed with male sex and even male potency, such as Agni or Atar. Agni is born ignited by Indra from the friction of two querns, Heaven and Earth, which refers to fire as the effect of sexual intercourse, and Svarozhits is the son of Svarog, who is often interpreted as the god of sky, and as a culture hero – a blacksmith who wields fire. A Kuyavian folk song is associated with this motif:

Na podolu w szczyrem polu
stoi kuźnia na kamieniu.
A w tej kuźni kowal kuje,
nigdy ognia nie zgasuje.

Some researchers also believe that Svarozhits is identical with Dazhbog. This is supported by the fact that the name Svarozhits literally means "son of Svarog," and in the Primary Chronicle, which contains an excerpt from the Slavic translation of the Chronicle of John Malalas, Dažbog is also depicted as the son of Svarog. Additionally, it is uncertain where the translation of the Chronicle was made; according to Henryk Łowmiański, the argument for the Bulgarian translation of the Chronicle is that in Bulgarian language the suffix –its, –ich has been completely forgotten, so that in Bulgarian language Dazhbog is called "the son of Svarog", and in other parts of Slavdom he is simply called Svarozhits. However, there is no general consensus on this interpretation, and the Sermon by the Holy Father Saint John Chrysostom, which mentions both Svarozhits and Dazhbog, is given as an argument against it. In that case, both gods would be brothers, the sons of Svarog, Svarozhits would be equivalent to Agni, and Dazhbog would be equivalent to Surya.

Perhaps Bruno mentioned St. Maurice, the patron saint of knighthood and armed struggle, in his letter because he considered him to be the christian equivalent of Svarozhits.

=== Svarozhits-Radegast ===
Svarozhits is most likely identical with Radegast, the god mentioned by Adam of Bremen as the chief god of Radogost, where according to earlier sources Svarozhits was supposed to be the chief god, and, according to Helmold, the god of the Obotrites.

== Bibliography ==
- Gieysztor, Aleksander (2006). Mitologia Słowian (in Polish). Warsaw: Wydawnictwa Uniwersytetu Warszawskiego. ISBN 978-83-235-0234-0.
- Szyjewski, Andrzej (2003). Religia Słowian (in Polish). Kraków: Wydawnictwo WAM. ISBN 83-7318-205-5.
- Brückner, Aleksander (1985). Mitologia słowiańska. Warsaw: Państwowe Wydawnictwo Naukowe. ISBN 8301062452.
- Alvarez-Pedroza, Juan Antonio (2021). Sources of Slavic Pre-Christian Religion. Leiden: Koninklijke Brill. ISBN 978-90-04-44138-5.
- Téra, Michal (2009). Perun: Bůh hromovládce (in Czech). Červený Kostelec: Pavel Mervart. ISBN 978-80-86818-82-5.
- Váňa, Zdeněk (1990). Svět slovanských bohů a démonů (in Czech). Praga: Panorama. ISBN 80-7038-187-6.
- Łowmiański, Henryk (1979). Religia Słowian i jej upadek, w. VI-XII (in Polish). Warsaw: Państwowe Wydawnictwo Naukowe. ISBN 83-01-00033-3.
- Ivanov, Vyacheslav Vsevolodovich; Toporov, Vladimir Nikolayevich (1980). Мифы народов мира. Энциклопедия (in Russian). Vol. 2. Moscow: Советская энциклопедия.
- Strzelczyk, Jerzy (1998). Mity, podania i wierzenia dawnych Słowian (in Polish). Poznań: Dom Wydawniczy REBIS. ISBN 978-83-7301-973-7.
- Borissoff, Constantine Leo (2014). "Non-Iranian origin of the Eastern-Slavonic god Xŭrsŭ/Xors". Studia Mythologica Slavica. 17: 9–36. doi:10.3986/sms.v17i0.1491. ISSN 1581-128X.
- Šmitek, Zmago (2010). "Od staroslovanskega Svarožiča/Radogosta do slovenskega Kresnika". Studia Mythologica Slavica (in Slovenian and English). 13: 187–197. doi:10.3986/sms.v13i0.1647. ISSN 1581-128X.
- Ivanov, Vyacheslav Vsevolodovich; Toporov, Vladimir Nikolayevich (2001). Tolstaya, Svetlana Mikhaylovna; Radenković, Ljubinko (eds.). Словенска митологија: Енциклопедијски речник (in Serbian). Belgrad: Zepter Book World. pp. 484–485.
- Bajuk, Lidija (2005). "Moj božiću Svarožiću, lunaj le!". In Pintarić, Ana (ed.). Zbornik radova s međunarodnoga znanstvenog skupa "Zlatni danci 6 - Život i djelo(vanje) Ivane Brlić-Mažuranić" (in Croatian). Osijek: Filozofski fakultet Osijek. pp. 41–67. ISBN 953-6456-58-3.
