= Smilja Tišma =

Serbian politician

- Смиља Тишма

Member of the National Assembly of the Republic of Serbia
- In office 3 August 2020 – 1 August 2022

President of the National Assembly of the Republic of Serbia (acting)
- In office 3 August 2020 – 22 October 2020
- Preceded by: Maja Gojković
- Succeeded by: Ivica Dačić

Personal details
- Born: 9 June 1929 (age 97) [official] Zrinska, Sava Banovina, Kingdom of Yugoslavia
- Party: Independent

Smilja I. Tišma (Serbian Cyrillic: Смиља И. Тишма; born c. 1929) is a retired Serbian politician who served in the Serbian national assembly from 2020 to 2022. She was elected on the list of the Socialist Party of Serbia (SPS), but she is not a member of any party.

Tišma was a child prisoner in the fascist Independent State of Croatia during World War II. She survived the concentration camp system and has shared her account of the war years through a series of oral history interviews.

== Early years and childhood during World War II ==
Tišma was born to an ethnic Serb family in the village of Zrinska in western Slavonia and raised in the community. At the time, the village was located in the Sava Banovina of the Kingdom of Yugoslavia; it is part of Croatia today. Official documents say that she was born on 9 June 1929, although she discovered in the post-World War II period that neither the year nor the date is accurate. In a 2010 interview, she said that she was born on an unknown date in June and that her year of birth was sometime in the early 1930s; nonetheless, she has used 9 June 1929 as her birth date for official purposes. Her father was a farmer, and she was raised in a rural household.

Tišma was still a child when World War II began and the Independent State of Croatia was established under the fascist Ustaše. As she has recounted in oral history interviews, she and her family suffered severe hardships under fascist rule. Her father was arrested by the Ustaše in 1941 and is believed to have died in a concentration camp. In the next two years, she and other members of her family were detained in a number of different camps, including the notorious Jasenovac camp; she has recounted the horrific conditions to which prisoners were subjected and has said that her mother is also believed to have died during this time. Tišma was ultimately sent to the Jastrebarsko children's camp and was part of a group of children taken to Ludbreg and required to work on the farms of local peasants. An ethnic Croat neighbour from her home village was able to rescue her and her siblings in late 1943 and bring them home; she spent the remainder of the war living with family members and neighbours in and around Zrinska, hiding in a nearby forest during battles.

Tišma and her brother attended the opening of Yugoslavia's Jasenovac Memorial Site in 1964. She later founded the Association of Detainees in Jasenovac.

== Later years and election to the national assembly ==
Tišma arrived in Belgrade after the end of the war, and she and her siblings lived afterward in various parts of the People's Republic of Serbia. She graduated from the University of Belgrade Faculty of Law and spent her career working in the Yugoslavian ministry of labour, veterans' affairs, and social affairs. She was a member of the League of Communists of Yugoslavia and served on its central committee; in this capacity, she delivered lectures of behalf of the party at different locations across the country. In a September 2020 interview, she said that she would vote to restore that time period if it were possible. After retiring, she was not politically active again until 2020.

In the 2020 Serbian parliamentary election, Tišma was given the fifth position on a coalition electoral list led by the Socialist Party of Serbia. Her endorsement was from the Socialist Party, although she was not a member of any party. The list won thirty-two mandates, and she was elected. The Socialists continued their participation in a coalition government led by the Serbian Progressive Party (SNS) after the election, and Tišma served as a supporter of the administration. As the assembly's oldest member (according to her officially registered birth date), she was its interim president from 3 August until 22 October 2020, when Socialist Party leader Ivica Dačić was chosen as speaker.

During her parliamentary term, Tišma was a member of the labour committee (Note: Formally known as the Committee on Labour, Social Issues, Social Inclusion, and Poverty Reduction.) and the parliamentary friendship groups with France, Greece, Israel, Italy, and Russia. She served in the Socialist Party's parliamentary group. In May 2021, she spoke in the national assembly about the crimes of the Independent State of Croatia during World War II and called for the assembly to support a resolution recognizing that genocide had taken place against Serbs, Jews, and Roma.

Tišma was not a candidate in the 2022 Serbian parliamentary election, and her term in office ended when the new assembly convened on 1 August 2022.
