= Družba Pere Kvržice (film) =

- Directed by: Vladimir Tadej
- Written by: Vladimir Tadej
- Based on: Družba Pere Kvržice by Mato Lovrak
- Starring: Mladen Vasary; Predrag Vuković; Boris Dvornik; Antun Vrdoljak
- Music by: Živan Cvitković
- Production company: Croatia Film
- Release date: 1970
- Country: Croatia
- Language: Croatian

Družba Pere Kvržice is a Croatian children's film directed by Vladimir Tadej. It was released in 1970.

It is based on the children's novel of the same name by Mato Lovrak.

== Cast ==
- Mladen Vasary as Pero Kvržica
- Predrag Vuković as Šilo
- Berislav Kokot as Divljak
- Boris Vujović as Milo Dijete
- Zoran Havrle as Medo
- Nikica Halužan as Budala
- Marina Nemet as Marija
- Dubravka Dolovčak as Danica
- Boris Dvornik as the policeman Jozo
- Antun Vrdoljak as the teacher
- Adem Čejvan as Pero's father
- Inge Appelt as Pero's mother
- Mato Ergović as Markan / the master Marko
- Antun Nalis as the Reverent
