= Dražica, Croatia =

Dražica
- Village
- Location within Croatia
- Coordinates: 45°43′33″N 16°58′47″E
- Country: Croatia
- County: Bjelovar-Bilogora County
- Municipality: Veliki Grđevac

Area
  - Total: 4.1 sq mi (10.7 km^{2})
- Elevation: 446 ft (136 m)

Population (2021)
  - Total: 103
  - Density: 24.9/sq mi (9.63/km^{2})
- Time zone: UTC+1 (CET)
  - Summer (DST): UTC+2 (CEST)
- Postal code: 43270 Veliki Grđevac
- Area code: 043
- Vehicle registration: DA

Dražica is a village in the municipality Veliki Grđevac, Bjelovar-Bilogora County in Croatia.

== Demographics ==
According to the 2021 census, its population was 103.

According to the 2001 census, there are 163 inhabitants, in 72 of family households.
