= Gornja Kovačica =

- Village
- Location within Croatia
- Coordinates: 45°46′13″N 17°06′40″E
- Country: Croatia
- County: Bjelovar-Bilogora County
- Municipality: Veliki Grđevac

Area
  - Total: 4.1 sq mi (10.7 km^{2})
- Elevation: 538 ft (164 m)

Population (2021)
  - Total: 225
  - Density: 54.5/sq mi (21.0/km^{2})
- Time zone: UTC+1 (CET)
  - Summer (DST): UTC+2 (CEST)
- Postal code: 43270 Veliki Grđevac
- Area code: 043
- Vehicle registration: DA

Gornja Kovačica is a village in the municipality Veliki Grđevac, Bjelovar-Bilogora County in Croatia.

== Demographics ==
According to the 2021 census, its population was 225.

According to the 2001 census, there were 309 inhabitants, in 96 of family households.
