= Wolin Svetovit =

Statuette from Wolin island, Poland

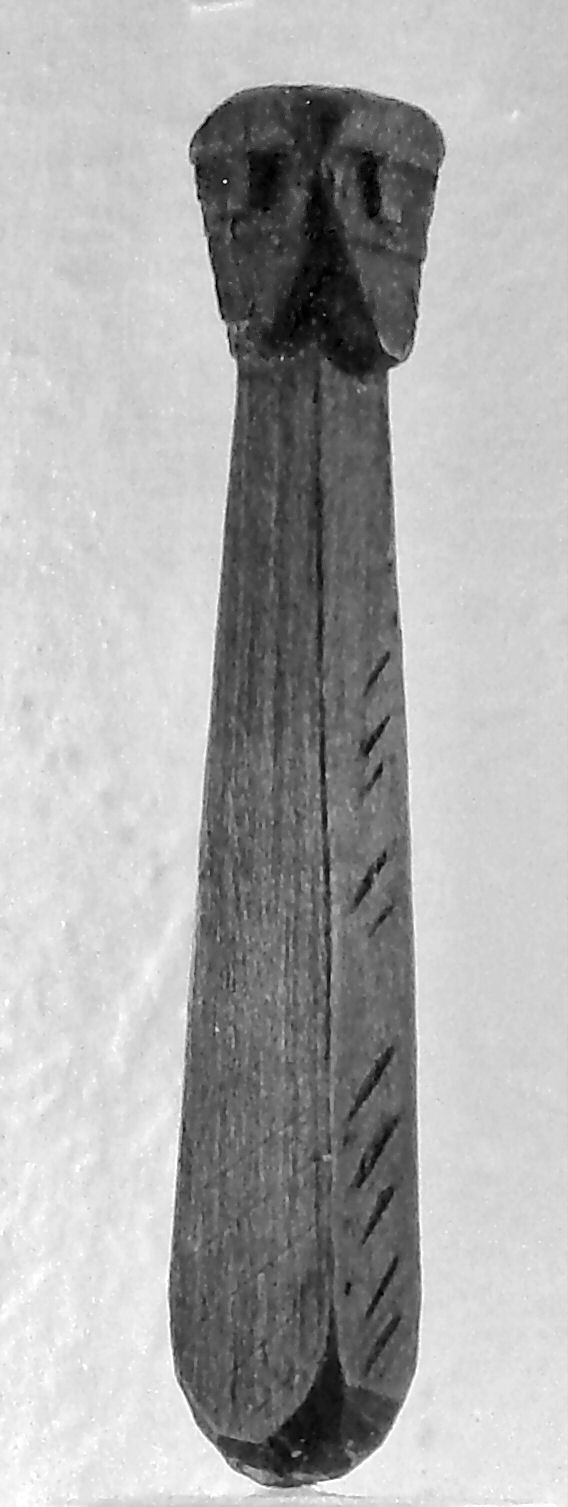
Wolin Svetovit.

Wolin Svetovit (Polish: Świętowit Woliński) is either a 9th- or a 10th-century figurine made from the wood of European yew tree, discovered in 1974, in the island of Wolin, Poland. The figurine depicts a four-sided character with four faces, that had been identified as depicting Svetovit, a god of abundance and war in the Slavic paganism.

== Characteristics ==
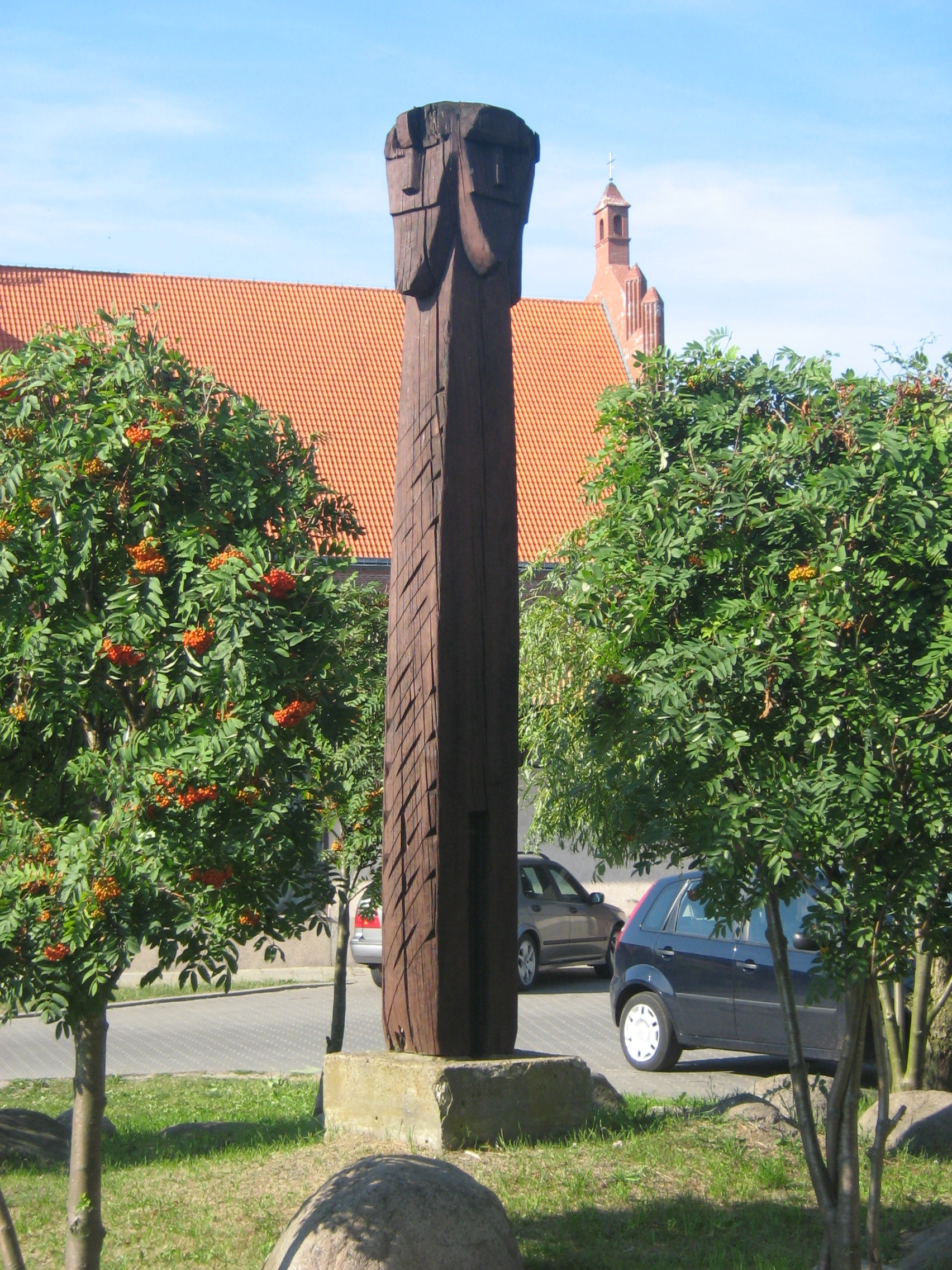
The statue, made to resemble the figurine, in the town of Wolin.

There had been four figurines discovered in the island of Wolin, Poland. They had been dated to come either from 9th or a 10th-century. Each figurine has the height of approximately 6 cm. The figurine depicts a character with four faces, that had been identified as depicting Svetovit, a god of abundance and war in the Slavic paganism. It is made out of the wood of European yew tree.

The figurines are unique, as, they were small objects used in the household and private religious practices in Slavic paganism, as opposed, to previous founding of sculptures of Slavic deities, that were bigger, and used in public religious practices.

Currently, the figurine is placed on a display in the Regional Museum in Wolin, Poland.

== See also ==
- Zbruch Idol
