= Pavlovac, Bjelovar-Bilogora County =

Pavlovac
- Village
- Location within Croatia
- Coordinates: 45°42′58″N 17°03′03″E
- Country: Croatia
- County: Bjelovar-Bilogora County
- Municipality: Veliki Grđevac

Area
  - Total: 7.8 sq mi (20.3 km^{2})
- Elevation: 466 ft (142 m)

Population (2021)
  - Total: 427
  - Density: 54.5/sq mi (21.0/km^{2})
- Time zone: UTC+1 (CET)
  - Summer (DST): UTC+2 (CEST)
- Postal code: 43270 Veliki Grđevac
- Area code: 043
- Vehicle registration: DA

Pavlovac is a village in the municipality Veliki Grđevac, Bjelovar-Bilogora County in Croatia.

== Demographics ==
According to the 2021 census, its population was only 427.

According to the 2001 census, there were 679 inhabitants, in 242 family households.
