= Mala Pisanica =

- Village
- Location within Croatia
- Coordinates: 45°46′36″N 17°01′00″E
- Country: Croatia
- County: Bjelovar-Bilogora County
- Municipality: Veliki Grđevac

Area
  - Total: 4.7 sq mi (12.3 km^{2})
- Elevation: 456 ft (139 m)

Population (2021)
  - Total: 142
  - Density: 29.9/sq mi (11.5/km^{2})
- Time zone: UTC+1 (CET)
  - Summer (DST): UTC+2 (CEST)
- Postal code: 43270 Veliki Grđevac
- Area code: 043
- Vehicle registration: DA

Mala Pisanica is a village in the municipality Veliki Grđevac, Bjelovar-Bilogora County in Croatia.

== Demographics ==
According to the 2021 census, its population was only 142.

According to the 2001 census, there were 222 inhabitants, in 75 of family households.
