= Mali Grđevac =

- Village
- Location within Croatia
- Coordinates: 45°46′20″N 17°10′16″E
- Country: Croatia
- County: Bjelovar-Bilogora County
- Municipality: Veliki Grđevac

Area
  - Total: 5.6 sq mi (14.5 km^{2})
- Elevation: 528 ft (161 m)

Population (2021)
  - Total: 0
  - Density: 0.0/sq mi (0.0/km^{2})
- Time zone: UTC+1 (CET)
  - Summer (DST): UTC+2 (CEST)
- Postal code: 43270 Veliki Grđevac
- Area code: 043
- Vehicle registration: DA

Mali Grđevac is a village in the municipality Veliki Grđevac, Bjelovar-Bilogora County in Croatia.

== Demographics ==
According to the 2021 census, it had no population anymore.

According to the 2001 census, there still were 13 inhabitants, in 8 of family households.
