= Sibenik, Bjelovar-Bilogora County =

Sibenik
- Village
- Location within Croatia
- Coordinates: 45°48′43″N 17°10′59″E
- Country: Croatia
- County: Bjelovar-Bilogora County
- Municipality: Veliki Grđevac

Area
  - Total: 1.7 sq mi (4.4 km^{2})
- Elevation: 597 ft (182 m)

Population (2021)
  - Total: 13
  - Density: 7.7/sq mi (3.0/km^{2})
- Time zone: UTC+1 (CET)
  - Summer (DST): UTC+2 (CEST)
- Postal code: 43270 Veliki Grđevac
- Area code: 043
- Vehicle registration: DA

Sibenik is a village in the municipality Veliki Grđevac, Bjelovar-Bilogora County in Croatia.

== Demographics ==
According to the 2021 census, its population was only 13.

According to the 2001 census, there were 38 inhabitants, in 13 of family households.
