= Družba Pere Kvržice =

1933 children's novel by Mato Lovrak

Družba Pere Kvržice ("Pero the Lump's gang") is a 1933 children's novel written by Croatian children's novelist Mato Lovrak. The plot concerns a group of children headed by Pero "Kvržica", who secretly decide to restore a disused village mill. It remains Lovrak's second best known work, after his first novel, Vlak u snijegu.

In 1970 the novel was made into a theatrical film of the same title, directed by Vladimir Tadej. In 2011, it was adapted for theatre. It is required reading in the 4th grade in all Croatian primary schools.
