= Donja Kovačica =

- Village
- Location within Croatia
- Coordinates: 45°45′14″N 16°59′52″E
- Country: Croatia
- County: Bjelovar-Bilogora County
- Municipality: Veliki Grđevac

Area
  - Total: 4.9 sq mi (12.8 km^{2})
- Elevation: 436 ft (133 m)

Population (2021)
  - Total: 232
  - Density: 46.9/sq mi (18.1/km^{2})
- Time zone: UTC+1 (CET)
  - Summer (DST): UTC+2 (CEST)
- Postal code: 43270 Veliki Grđevac
- Area code: 043
- Vehicle registration: DA

Donja Kovačica is a village in the municipality Veliki Grđevac, Bjelovar-Bilogora County in Croatia.

== Demographics ==
According to the 2021 census, its population was 232.

According to the 2001 census, there were 342 inhabitants, in 99 family households.
