= Veliki Grđevac =

- Municipality
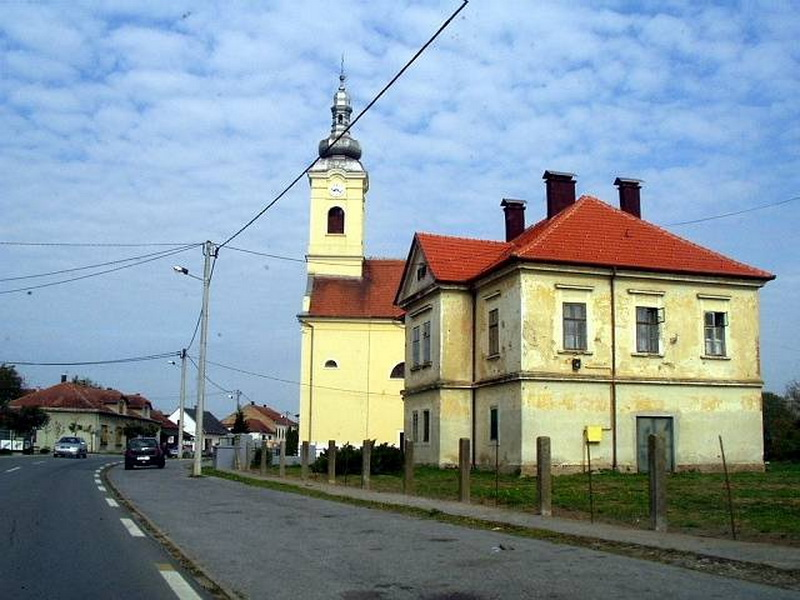
- Interactive map of Veliki Grđevac
- Location within Croatia
- Coordinates: 45°45′N 17°03′E
- Country: Croatia
- County: Bjelovar-Bilogora County
- First settled: 1244
- Municipality seat: Veliki Grđevac

Government
  - Chief: Marijan Dautanac (HNS)
  - Municipal Council: Members' List: • Antun Pehaček - Council President - HSS; • Eugen Horvat - Deputy - HNS; • Tomislav Pavlečić - Deputy - HNS; • Josip Bišćan - HSS; • Ana Brletić; • Krunoslav Bukovec; • Marija Čičak - HSLS; • Ivan Čolik - HNS; • Josip Đurđević - HDZ; • Zlatko Grdinić - HDZ; • Alojzije Groš - SDP; • Biserka Hirkić - HDZ; • Darko Krmela - HNS; • Goran Pajić - HNS; • Milenko Šenolt - HDZ; • Ljerka Vodopija - HNS

Area
  - Municipality: 169.3 km^{2} (65.4 sq mi)
  - Urban: 25.6 km^{2} (9.9 sq mi)
- Elevation: 146 m (479 ft)

Population (2021)
  - Municipality: 2,316
  - Density: 13.68/km^{2} (35.43/sq mi)
  - Urban: 1,054
  - Urban density: 41.2/km^{2} (107/sq mi)
- Demonym: Grđevčani
- Time zone: UTC+1 (CET)
  - Summer (DST): UTC+2 (CEST)
- Postal code: 43270 Veliki Grđevac
- Area code: 043
- Vehicle registration: DA
- Municipality Day (Patron saint): Pentecost
- Website: veliki-grdjevac.hr

Veliki Grđevac (pronounced [ʋêlikiː ɡr̩̂dʑeʋats], Hungarian: Nagygordonya) is a settlement and a municipality in Bjelovar-Bilogora County, Croatia.

== Geography ==
The present municipality Veliki Grđevac arose during the Croatian War of Independence, separated from the former municipality Grubišno Polje. Municipality area extends from the southwestern slopes of Bilogora hills, across the Česma river towards the northernmost slopes of the Moslavačka gora. Area around the Veliki Grđevac is characterized by wet meadows under Bilogora hills.

== Demographics ==
According to the 2021 census, the population of the municipality was 2,316, with 1,054 living in the town proper.

According to the 2001 census, there are 3,248 inhabitants, 80.41% of which are Croats, in 1,157 of family households.

The municipality consists of the following settlements:

- Cremušina, population 1
- Donja Kovačica, population 232
- Dražica, population 103
- Gornja Kovačica, population 225
- Mala Pisanica, population 142
- Mali Grđevac, population 0
- Pavlovac, population 427
- Sibenik, population 13
- Topolovica, population 20
- Veliki Grđevac, population 1054
- Zrinska, population 99
Veliki Grđevac: Population trends 1857–2021
v

population	4799	5488	5206	7708	9090	9113	9050	9571	7751	8299	7667	6561	5250	4490	3313	2849	2316
	1857	1869	1880	1890	1900	1910	1921	1931	1948	1953	1961	1971	1981	1991	2001	2011	2021

Sources: Croatian Bureau of Statistics publications

== Politics ==
=== Minority councils and representatives ===
Directly elected minority councils and representatives are tasked with consulting tasks for the local or regional authorities in which they are advocating for minority rights and interests, integration into public life and participation in the management of local affairs. At the 2023 Croatian national minorities councils and representatives elections Czechs, Hungarians and Serbs of Croatia all fulfilled legal requirements to each elect 10 members minority councils of the Municipality of Severin but the elections for Czech council were not organized due to the lack of candidates and only 8 members were elected in Serb one.

== History ==
In the 19th century, the town was also known as Velike Gajovaz. In the late 19th and early 20th century, Veliki Grđevac was part of the Bjelovar-Križevci County of the Kingdom of Croatia-Slavonia.

== Notable people ==
- Mato Lovrak (1899–1974), Croatian writer
- Károly Knezić (1808–1849), honvéd general in the Hungarian Army
- Dušan Kašić (1914–1990), historian and Orthodox Christian theologian

== Monuments and sightseeings ==
- Mato Lovrak center — consisting of compositional museum train and a mill with pond that represented the most famous symbols of the Mato Lovrak's novels: "Train in the Snow" and "Družba Pere Kvržice" (translated as "Pero Lump gang").
- Friend of Nature Trail — the nature friends path is located nearby Lovrak center, and viewing is accompanied by the guides. The pathis intended for students, for their nature classes, organised groups, and for all friends of nature. Things to see:
  - Biology interests of forest vegetations
  - The natural regeneration of forest
  - Forest animals

== Education ==
- Osnovna škola Mate Lovraka (English: Mato Lovrak Elementary School)

== Culture ==
Lovrak days of culture are traditional cultural and educational events dedicated to the national significance Mato Lovrak, one of the most successful children's writer in Croatia.

== Sport ==
- Football club "Gordowa" Veliki Grđevac
- Karate Klub "Gordowa" Veliki Grđevac
- Sports-Fishing Association "Grđevica" Veliki Grđevac
- Hunting association "Jelen" (Deer) Veliki Grđevac
