= Cremušina =

- Village
- Location within Croatia
- Coordinates: 45°48′31″N 17°12′44″E
- Country: Croatia
- County: Bjelovar-Bilogora County
- Municipality: Veliki Grđevac

Area
  - Total: 5.6 sq mi (14.6 km^{2})
- Elevation: 509 ft (155 m)

Population (2021)
  - Total: 1
  - Density: 0.18/sq mi (0.068/km^{2})
- Time zone: UTC+1 (CET)
  - Summer (DST): UTC+2 (CEST)
- Postal code: 43270 Veliki Grđevac
- Area code: 043
- Vehicle registration: DA

Cremušina is a village in the municipality Veliki Grđevac, Bjelovar-Bilogora County in Croatia.

== Demographics ==
According to the 2021 census, its population was only 1.

According to the 2001 census, there were 3 inhabitants, in 2 of family households.
