= Zrinska =

- Village
- Location within Croatia
- Coordinates: 45°47′10″N 17°08′42″E
- Country: Croatia
- County: Bjelovar-Bilogora County
- Municipality: Veliki Grđevac

Area
  - Total: 13.9 sq mi (35.9 km^{2})
- Elevation: 604 ft (184 m)

Population (2021)
  - Total: 99
  - Density: 7.1/sq mi (2.8/km^{2})
- Time zone: UTC+1 (CET)
  - Summer (DST): UTC+2 (CEST)
- Postal code: 43270 Veliki Grđevac
- Area code: 043
- Vehicle registration: DA

Zrinska is a village in the municipality Veliki Grđevac, Bjelovar-Bilogora County in Croatia.

== Demographics ==
According to the 2021 census, its population was only 99.

According to the 2001 census, there are 153 inhabitants in 72 family households.
