= Grginac =

- Village
- Location within Croatia
- Coordinates: 45.9203232°N 16.8818063°E
- Country: Croatia
- County: Bjelovar-Bilogora County
- Municipality: Veliko Trojstvo

Area
  - Total: 1.5 sq mi (4.0 km^{2})

Population (2021)
  - Total: 171
  - Density: 110/sq mi (43/km^{2})
- Time zone: UTC+1 (CET)
  - Summer (DST): UTC+2 (CEST)

Grginac is a village in Croatia.

== Demographics ==
According to the 2021 census, its population was 171.
