= Studia mythologica Slavica =

Slovene academic journal

- Editor: Monika Kropej Telban
- Editor: Katja Hrobat Virloget
- Frequency: Annual
- Publisher: Institute of Slovenian Ethnology, University of Udine
- First issue: 1998; 27 years ago
- Country: Slovenia
- Language: Slavic, English, German, Italian
- Website: ojs.zrc-sazu.si/sms
- ISSN: 1408-6271 (print); 1581-128X (web)

Logo used in 1998–2016

Studia mythologica Slavica is a Slovene academic journal dedicated to ethnology, history, archaeology, linguistics, religious studies, literary history and philosophy in the context of Slavic mythology. Published since 1998 by the Institute of Slovenian Ethnology (Scientific Research Centre of the Slovenian Academy of Science and Arts (ZRC SAZU)) and the University of Udine. The journal is an annual published in print and online. Articles are published in all Slavic languages, in English, German and Italian. The main goal of the journal is to present comparative research that presents Slavic culture in the broader context of European and non-European cultures. The journal also encourages the study of contemporary phenomena of spiritual, social and material culture and their transformations.

== Editorial Team ==
Editors-in-Chief

- dr. Monika Kropej Telban (ZRC SAZU, Institute of Slovenian Ethnology)
- dr. Katja Hrobat Virloget (University of Primorska, Faculty of Humanities)

Editors

- dr. Roberto Dapit (University of Udine, Department of Languages and Literatures, Communication, Education and Society, Italy)

Review Editor

- dr. Saša Babič (ZRC SAZU)

Advisory Board

- Natka Badurina (University of Udine, Italy)
- Nikos Chausidis (Ss. Cyril and Methodius University of Skopje, North Macedonia)
- Pietro U. Dini (University of Pisa, Italy)
- Larisa Fialkova (University of Haifa, Israel)
- Mare Kõiva (Estonian Literary Museum, Estonia)
- Janina Kursīte (Riga Stradiņš University, Latvia)
- Nijolė Laurinkienė (Institute of Lithuanian Literature and Folklore, Lithuania)
- Mirjam Mencej (University of Ljubljana, Slovenia)
- Vladimir Nartnik (ZRC SAZU, Slovenia)
- Andrej Pleterski (ZRC SAZU, Slovenia)
- Ljubinko Radenković (SANU, Serbia)
- Svetlana Tolstaya (Institute for Slavic Studies of the Russian Academy of Sciences, Russia)
- Giorgio Ziffer (University of Udine, Italy)

== Studia mythologica Slavica – Supplementa ==
Since 2004, the journal also publishes a series of books Studia mythologica Slavica - Supplementa, intended for monographs.

== See also ==
- List of academic journals published in Slovenia
