= Mato Lovrak =

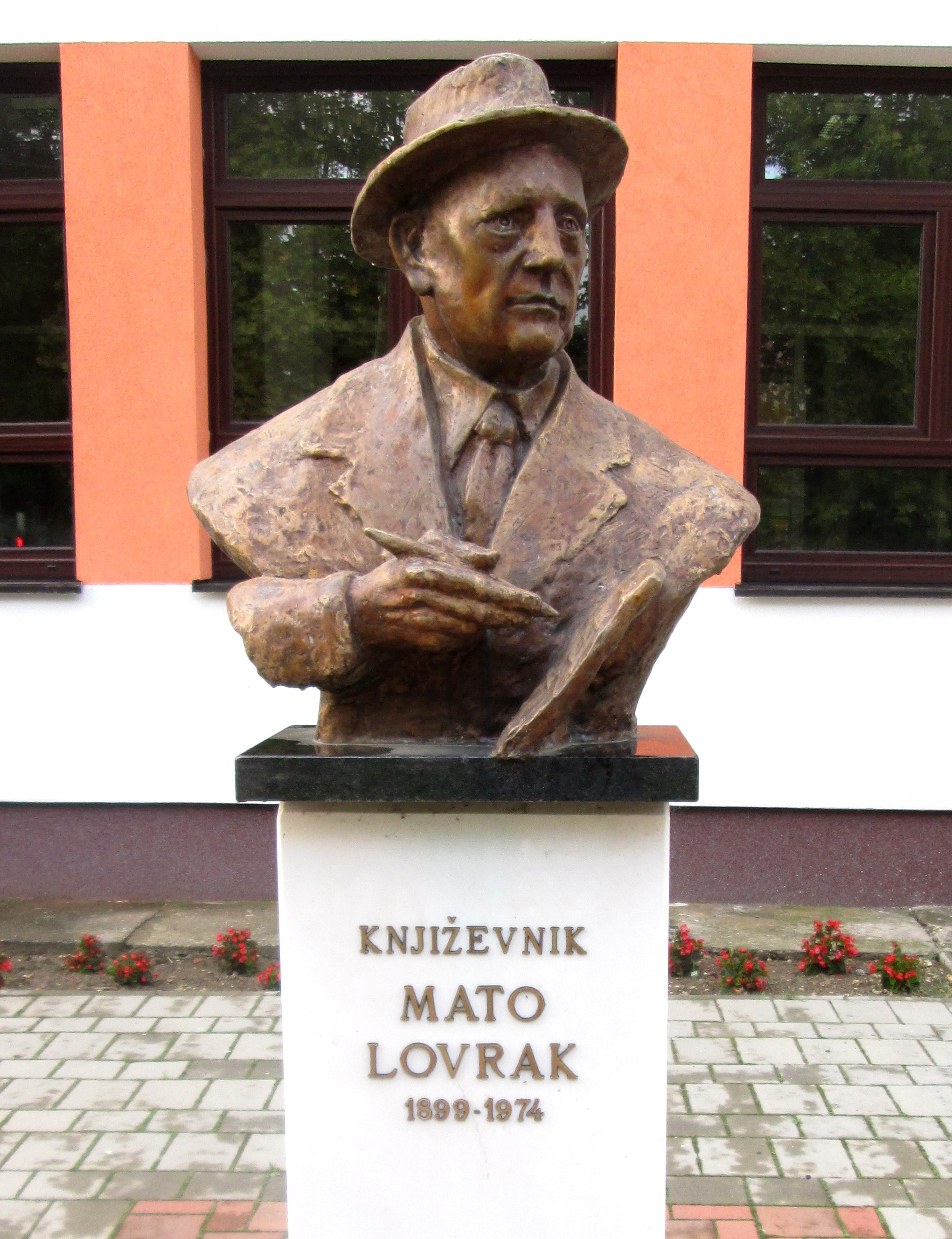
- Born: 8 March 1899; Veliki Grđevac, Austria-Hungary
- Died: 14 March 1974 (aged 75); Zagreb, SFR Yugoslavia
- Education: Teacher training college
- Occupations: Novelist, short story writer
- Writing career
- Language: Croatian
- Genres: Novels, short stories
- Notable works: "Vlak u snijegu" "Družba Pere Kvržice"

Mato Lovrak (8 March 1899 - 14 March 1974) was a Croatian children's literature writer.

== Biography ==
Mato Lovrak was born on 8 March 1899 in Veliki Grđevac.

Lovrak finished teacher training college in Zagreb and served as teacher in Kutina, Veliki Grđevac, Veliki Zdenci and Zagreb. Lovrak wrote realistic short stories and novels for children.

His most famous works are "Vlak u snijegu" ("A Train in the Snow"), "Družba Pere Kvržice" ("Pero Kvržica's Gang"). Those novels were the basis for two children's movies with the same names.

"Vlak u snijegu" has been translated into German, Hungarian, Polish, Czech and Slovene language. "Družba Pere Kvržice" has been translated into Esperanto.

His works emphasized love for children, the beauty of nature and the pursuit of social justice. Lovrak made a great impact on Croatian literature for children and influenced other writers.

Mato Lovrak died in Zagreb on 14 March 1974.
