= Tomaš, Croatia =

Tomaš
- Village
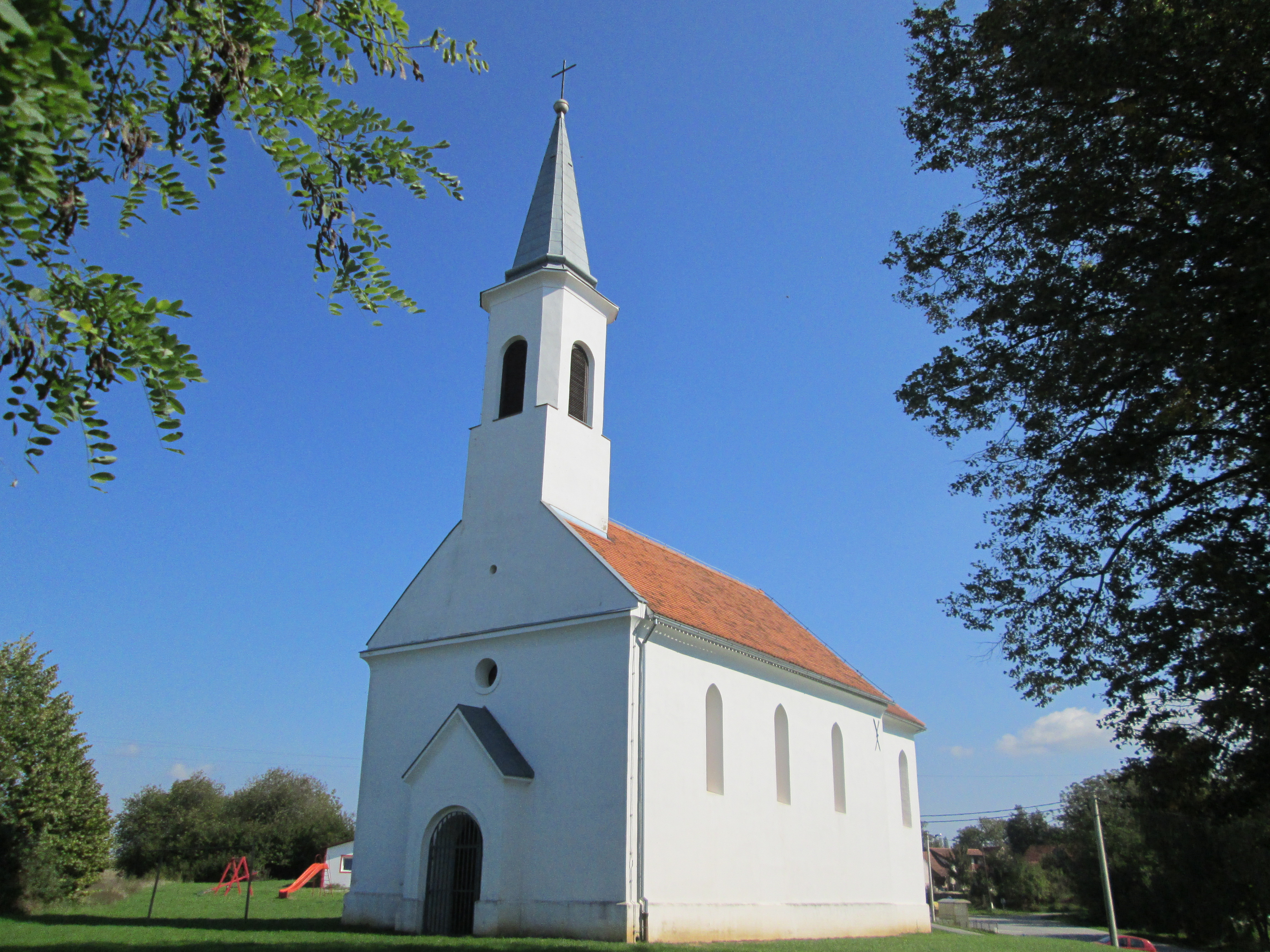
- St. Thomas Church in Tomaš, Bjelovar, Croatia

- Location within Croatia
- Country: Croatia
- County: Bjelovar-Bilogora County
- Municipality: Bjelovar

Area
  - Total: 2.8 sq mi (7.3 km^{2})

Population (2021)
  - Total: 192
  - Density: 68/sq mi (26/km^{2})
- Time zone: UTC+1 (CET)
  - Summer (DST): UTC+2 (CEST)

Tomaš is a village in Croatia.

== Demographics ==
According to the 2021 census, its population was 192.
