= Ciglena =

- Village
- Location within Croatia
- Coordinates: 45°52′N 16°56′E
- Country: Croatia
- County: Bjelovar-Bilogora County
- Municipality: Bjelovar

Area
  - Total: 2.9 sq mi (7.4 km^{2})

Population (2021)
  - Total: 278
  - Density: 97/sq mi (38/km^{2})
- Time zone: UTC+1 (CET)
  - Summer (DST): UTC+2 (CEST)

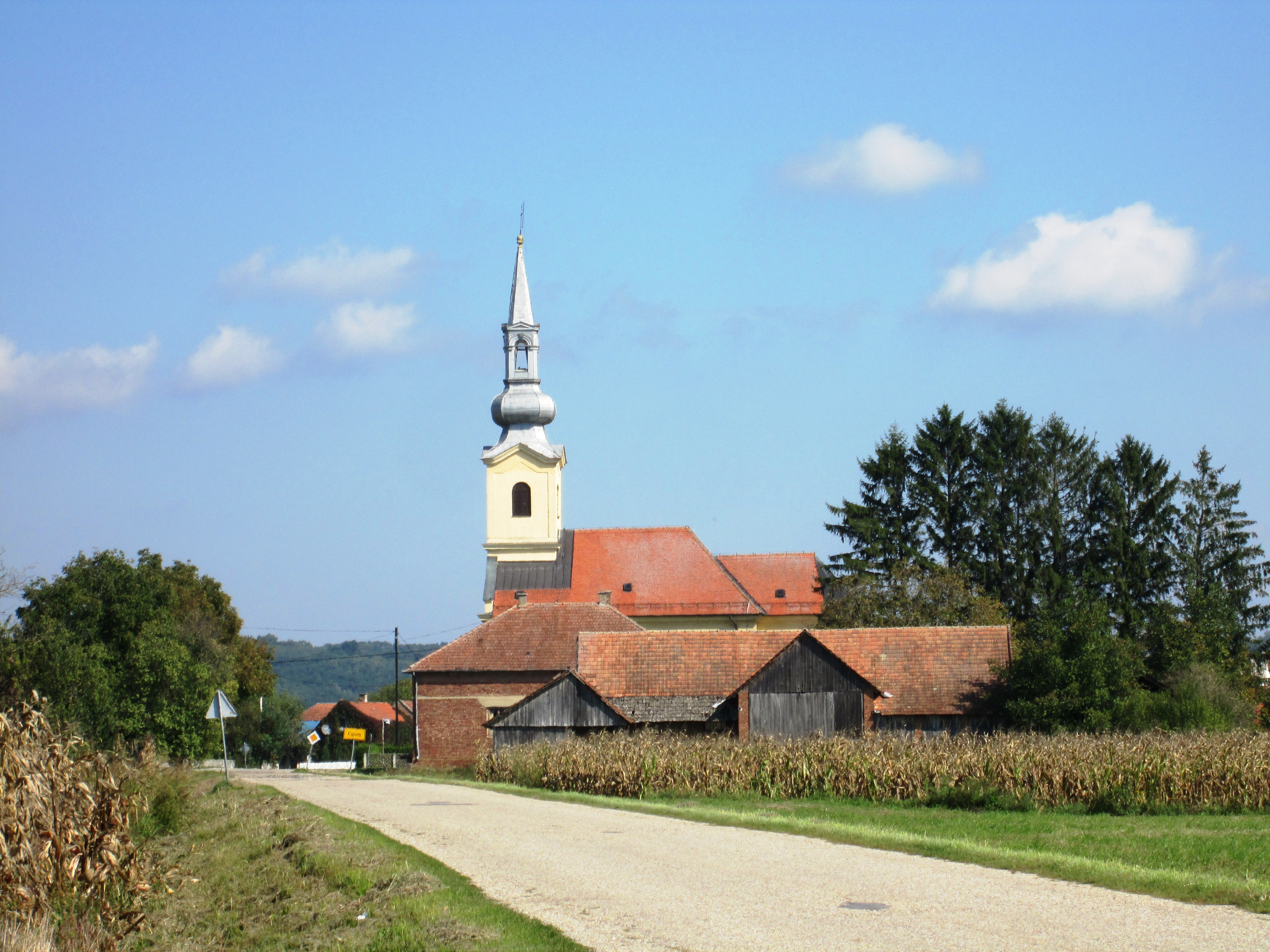
St. Simon and St. Jude Thaddeus Church in Ciglena, Croatia.

Ciglena is a village in Croatia.

== Demographics ==
According to the 2021 census, its population was 278. It was 340 in 2011.
