= List of Slavic deities =

The pagan Slavs were polytheistic, which means that they worshipped many gods and goddesses. The gods of the Slavs are known primarily from a small number of chronicles and letopises, or not very accurate Christian sermons against paganism. Additionally, more numerous sources in which Slavic theonyms are preserved include names, proper names, place names, folk holidays, and language, including sayings.

Information about Slavic paganism, including the gods, is scarce because Christian missionaries were not very interested in the spiritual life of the Slavs. Also, no accounts written down directly by the pagan Slavs exist. During the process of Christianisation, the deities could, on the one hand, be demonized in order to deter people from worshipping them, or, on the other, have their characteristics and functions appropriated and applied to certain saints, with the aim of making the new religion seem less alien by creating a sense of continuity.

== Common Slavic deities ==
Because of the small number of sources, there is no consensus among scholars of Slavic mythology on the extent of the worship of even the most important deities. Listed in this paragraph are those whose Panslavic range is most often recognized. In addition to these, the East Slavic Mokosh (a presumed toponym in the Czech Republic), and the East Slavic Stribog (toponyms in Poland) are sometimes indicated.

=== Supreme deities ===
Based on the reconstructed myths around the figures of Perun and Veles, some scholars believe that both of these gods are chief deities. They are primarily found in the Slavic creation myth. According to some scholars, a pair of these gods prove "Slavic dualism", but there is no consensus on this either, and those who assume that such dualism in mythology may have existed, point out that Slavic dualism was probably not as extreme as in Christianity or Zoroastrianism.

Name	Image	Greek Myth	Details
Perun		Zeus	Perun is the god of lightning and thunder, as well as of war, and the patron of the druzhina. He is the etymological and functional continuator of the Proto-Indo-European thunder god *Perkʷunos, and shares many characteristics with other thunder gods worshipped by Indo-Europeans. He is mentioned most notably in Primary Chronicle, where a grey-haired and golden-moustached statue of Perun is described in temple on Old Kyiv Hill, and Third Novogorod Chronicle, where his statue is described in Peryn, and in many texts warning against paganism. His name survived in spells and in proper names. Armed usually with an axe, hammer, or spear, he fights chaos demons. His figure is preserved in folklore primarily in the form of saint Elijah and saint George.
Veles		Hades	Veles is a god of multiple functions, such complexity making comparison with other deities difficult. A chthonic deity, he rules over the underworld, to which, as psychopomp he conducts the souls of the dead, leading them out into the meadows of the beyond. As the god of wealth, he is associated with the care of cattle (cattle rather than money being, in ancient times, the primary form of wealth). Furthermore, like the Germanic Odin he is the patron deity of poets and other artists and also of those who practice magic (poetry having been intimately connected with magic in the past). The etymology of his name likely connects it with Slavic words associated with death. Mentioned primarily in Primary Chronicle; his name also often appears in proper names. His animal incarnations are bull or ox, dragon or zmey. His figure is preserved in folklore primarily in the form of saint Nicholas and the devil.

=== Other deities ===
Name	Image	Greek Myth	Details
Dazhbog		Apollo	Dazhbog is a sun god. His name, meaning "god of giving", may suggest that he was also a god of abundance. He appears in the Primary Chronicle, where he is described as the son of Svarog, in The Tale of Igor's Campaign, as well as in folk songs and proper names. By some researchers he is identified with Svarozhits, or is considered to be his brother.
Svarozhits		Hephaestus	Svarozhits is a fire god mentioned in minor East Slavic texts. He is also mentioned by Bruno in a letter to King Henry II and later in Thietmar's Chronicle as the chief deity of Rethra, the main political center of the Veleti. His name is generally translated as "son of Svarog", less commonly as "little, young Svarog". Generally identified with Radegast, less commonly with Dazhbog.

=== Personifications ===
Name	Image	Greek Myth	Details
Dola		Tyche	Dola is the personification of fate and destiny. Dola was assigned to a person at birth and stays with him for the rest of his life. It may be inherited from ancestors. It is generally invisible, but may have manifested in human or animal form. The opposite of Dola, understood as good fortune, was Nedola, the personification of bad fortune. Etymologically related to the Slavic words divide, part.
Mat Zemlya		Gaia	Mat Zemlya is a personification of the Earth appearing mainly in East Slavic texts but remaining in most Slavic languages. Perhaps epithet of Mokosh.
Rod			Rod is a figure, spirit, or deity often mentioned in minor East and South Slavic texts, generally along with Rozhanitsy. Etymologically related to the Slavic words for "family", "kin", "giving birth", etc. Bloodless sacrifices were offered to him. There is no consensus in scholarship about Rod's status in mythology.
Rozhanitsy		Moirai	Rozhanitsy ("Givers of life"), Sudenitsy ("Givers of fate"), and Narechnitsy ("Givers of destiny") are female spirits or deities of fate. They appear in the plural or as a single entity. In East and South Slavic sources they are often mentioned together with Rod. Their main function is to determine the child's fate for life, then they leave an invisible mark on his forehead. Man's fate was symbolized by the thread of life, on the length of which, measured by the Rozhanitsy, depended the length of man's life. Bloodless sacrifices were offered to them.
Zorya		Eos	Zorya is the personification of the dawn. She is the Slavic continuation of the Proto-Indo-European goddess of dawn *H₂éwsōs and has many of her characteristics: she lives overseas on the island of Bujan, opens the door for the Sun to go on its daily journey across the sky, also has a golden boat. Zora can be a single figure, two figures, or three. She appears in Christianized prayers and orders.

== West Slavic deities ==
Name	Image	Worshipped by	Greek Myth	Details
Svetovit		Rani		Svetovit is the chief god of the Slavic Rani. His cult is described by Helmold of Bosau and Saxo Grammaticus. Theonym comes from the word svęt "holy, sacred" with the suffix vit "lord". His main temple was located on Arkona. Inside the temple was his statue, described by Saxo as a four-headed statue holding an ornate horn in his right hand; there was also a large sword and other artifacts. The horn and white horse, dedicated to him, was used for divination. The theocratic rule of his priests limited the rule of knyaz.
Triglav		Polabians; Pomeranians		Triglav is a god mentioned in the Life of St. Otto and in the chronicle describing the capture of Slavic Brenna. He had a golden statue whose eyes and mouth were covered. A black horse, which was used by preachers to foretell the future, and a holy oak were dedicated to him. The three heads may symbolize the tripartite division between heaven, earth, and the underworld.
Radegast		Polabians; Redarians; Moravians		Radegast is a god mentioned by Adam of Bremen, and the information is repeated by Helmold. He was to occupy the first place among the gods worshipped at Rethra. Earlier sources state that the main god of Rethra was Svarozhits, thus Radegast is considered to be a epithet of Svarozhits or a local variant of his cult. A white horse was dedicated to him, and he himself was depicted wearing armor and a helmet. It is generally believed that his name is composed of the words rad "glad" and gost "guest". A modern statue of him is standing on the mountain Radhošť, which is also named after him.
Yarovit		Circipanians; Hobolians		Yarovit is a Polabian god mentioned in the Life of St. Otto, where a festival dedicated to him is described, for which the city was decorated. From the description and etymology, it is clear that he is a war god, and his temple contained a gold adorned shield. According to many researchers, Yarovit is identical to the East Slavic Yarylo.
Zhiva		Polabians		Zhiva is a goddess mentioned by Helmold. According to him, next to Radagast and Prone, she is the most important deity of the Slavs. Probably identical with the Polish deity Żywie mentioned by Jan Długosz. A theonym related to the word živeti "to live".
Prone or Prove		Polabians		Proue is a distorted name of a god mentioned by Helmold. This theonym is interpreted in several different ways: some scholars translate the name as Prove (from Slavic word pravo "law"), while others translate the name as Prone, a local variant of Perun's name. Helmold makes it clear that Proue, unlike other deities, did not have a statue, but an oak grove near Starogard, where courts were held every monday, was dedicated to him.
Rugiaevit		Rani		Rugievit is a god mentioned by Saxo Grammaticus and in the Knýtlinga saga. He was worshipped in Gardec on Rügen, where his temple was located, as well as Porevit and Porenut. His statue was made of oak wood, had a head with seven faces, seven swords at his belt and an eighth in his hand. According to Saxo, he was a war deity, also associated with the sexual sphere. The interpretation of his name remains a matter of debate.
Porevit		Rani		Porevit is a god mentioned by Saxo Grammaticus and in the Knýtlinga saga. He was worshipped in Gardec on Rügen, where his temple was located, as well as Rugieavit and Porenut. Statue of him had five heads, and importantly did not have any weapons. The meaning of the name is unclear, perhaps meaning "Lord of strength".
Porenut		Rani		Porenut is a god mentioned by Saxo Grammaticus and in the Knýtlinga saga. He was worshipped in Gardec on Rügen, where his temple was located, as well as Rugiaevit and Porevit. His idol had four faces and a fifth on his chest, which he held up with his hands. The etymology is debated.
Chernoglav		Rani		Chernoglav is a god mentioned in the Knýtlinga saga. He is described there as a god of victory with a silver mustache.
Podaga		Wagri		Podaga is a god who, according to Helmold, had his image in Plön. Meaning of the theonym is explained as "power, might". It was suggested that the name Podaga is identical with Długosz's Pogoda.
Devana		Poles; Lusatians		Devana is the goddess of wildlife, forests, the moon and hunting. Mentioned by Jan Długosz as a Polish equivalent of Diana. Devana, as Dživica, was also present in Lusatian folklore. She appears in Silesian customs together with Morana, which may indicate a double nature of these goddesses. Etymology of the name of the goddess is a subject of discussion. In Christian folklore, she may have been replaced by Our Lady of Thunder Candle.
Morana		Poles; Czechs; Slovaks; Moravians		Morana is the goddess of vegetation, but also of death and winter. She was mentioned by Jan Długosz as a Polish equivalent of Ceres. Burning or drowning Morana's image in the river is supposed to chase away winter and bring back spring, and this tradition is still alive in modern Poland, Slovakia, Moravia and parts of Bohemia. She appears in Silesian customs together with Devana, which may indicate the dual nature of these goddesses.

== East and South Slavic deities ==
Name	Image	Worshipped by	Greek Myth	Details
Stribog		East Slavs	Aeolus	Stribog is the god of the wind. Mentioned in the Primary Chronicle and The Tale of Igor's Campaign. He may also have been worshipped in Poland. His name is interpreted as the " spreading god".
Khors		East Slavs, West Slavs		Khors is a deity with unclear functions mentioned in the Primary Chronicle and The Tale of Igor's Campaign, as well as other minor sources. For many years he was interpreted as a sun god, supported by the theory that the name is a loan from one of the Iranian languages and means "Sun". In recent years, this etymology has come under strong criticism, and a native etymological link to fertility is suggested instead. His idol was allegedly located in Pskov.
Mokosh		East Slavs; Poles Czechs; Croats		Mokosh is a goddess mentioned in the Primary Chronicle and other minor texts. She is generally interpreted as Mother goddess. She appears in folklore as a creature with a large head and hands who shears sheep and spins flax, also associated in some way with masturbation. Etymologically related to the word mokrъ "wet". In Christianity she is continued by St. Paraskeva and St. Anastasia.
Simargl		East Slavs		Simargl is a deity mentioned in the Primary Chronicle, and mentioned in the Sermon by One Who Loves Christ in two entities: Sim and Rgl. Although the sources do not indicate any functions of this god it is believed that he is associated with the care of plants, as indicated by the god's name, which was borrowed by the Slavs from the Iranian Simurgh, a winged, dog-headed guardian of plants.
Svarog		South Slavs	Hephaestus.	Svarog is a god mentioned in the Primary Chronicle in a passage that is a Slavic translation of the Chronicle of John Malalas. This source depicts Svarog as the counterpart of the Greek Hephaestus, and the father of Dazhbog. The function and etymology of the god are unclear: according to some scholars he is related to the Slavic word svar meaning "quarrel", while according to others he is related to the Indian svar meaning "radiance", "sky", "sun". Based on etymology, interpreted as the smith god, or as the god of the sky.
Yarilo		East Slavs South Slavs	Demeter	East Slavic ritual and ritual figure attested since the 18th century Interpreted as a deity of vegetation.

== Deities listed anonymously ==
There are two sources that mention a nameless Slavic chief god. Procopius of Caesarea in the Gothic Wars describes the religion of the South Slavs:

Indeed, they believe that a single god, creator of the lightning bolt, is the sole lord of all things and they offer him sacrifices of cows and all manner of victims. The idea of destiny is unknown to them nor do they believe that it has any influence over men, but when death is at their heels because they have fallen sick or are preparing for war, they promise that, if spared, they will immediately offer a sacrifice in honour of the god in exchange for their life and, once they have been spared, they sacrifice whatever they have to hand and believe they have bought their salvation with this sacrifice.

Greek original text
θεὸν μὲν γὰρ ἕνα τὸν τῆς ἀστραπῆς δημιουργὸν ἁπάντων κύριον μόνον αὐτὸν νομίζουσιν εἶναι, καὶ θύουσιν αὐτῷ βόας τε καὶ ἱερεῖα πάντα· εἱμαρμένην δὲ οὔτε ἴσασιν οὔτε ἄλλως ὁμολογοῦσιν ἔν γε ἀνθρώποις ῥοπήν τινα ἔχειν, ἀλλ’ ἐπειδὰν αὐτοῖς ἐν ποσὶν ἤδη ὁ θάνατος εἴη, ἢ νόσῳ ἁλοῦσιν ἢ ἐς πόλεμον καθισταμένοις, ἐπαγγέλλονται μὲν, ἢν διαφύγωσι, θυσίαν τῷ θεῷ ἀντὶ τῆς ψυχῆς αὐτίκα ποιήσειν, διαφυγόντες δὲ θύουσιν ὅπερ ὑπέσχοντο, καὶ οἴονται τὴν σωτηρίαν ταύτης δὴ τῆς θυσίας αὐτοῖς ἐωνῆσθαι.

Similar information, however, concerning the West Slavic Polabians, appears in Helmold's Chronicle:

Within the multifarious aspect of the manifestations of their divinities, to which their fields, forests, sadness, and happiness are entrusted, they do not deny that there is one god in heaven who reigns above the others, that this is the only one responsible for celestial matters, and that the others obey him; each assuming a role, they come from his line and are more powerful the closer they are to said god.

Latin original text
Inter multiformia uero deorum numina, quibus arua, siluas, tristicias atque uoluptates attribuunt, non-diffitentur unum deum in celis ceteris imperitantem, illum prepotentem celestia tantum curare, hos uero distributis officiis obsequentes de sanguine eius processisse et unumquemque eo prestantiorem, quo proximiorem illi deo deorum.

It is unclear how reliably these accounts describe Slavic theology. Some scholars believe that these texts are Christian interpretations of the faith of the pagan Slavs; Helmold, writing about the god of gods, clearly borrowed the term (deus deorum) from the Book of psalms (50:1). In the case of Procopius' text, for example, Aleksander Brückner argued that the text was a calque, an image with a Hellenized tinge imposed on Slavic paganism. Scholars who accept at least partial authenticity of these messages believe that they may convey information about henotheism, the Slavic deus otiosus – a passive god who does not interfere directly in world affairs and whose commands are carried out by other gods. It is also possible that they may refer to the replacement of the passive sky god by a more active thunder god, just as the Greek Uranus was replaced by Zeus. Although Procopius and Helmold do not mention the names of these gods, whose names they probably did not know because of taboos, it is generally believed that Perun, or Svarog, was involved here.

Cosmas of Prague describes Czech paganism in his Chronica Boemorum through the Interpretatio Romana: "Therefore, sacrifice to your gods an ass so that they become your succour. Those who wish you to make this offering are Jupiter, most important of the gods, Mars himself, his sister Bellona and the son-in law of Ceres (i.e. Pluto).

In the Chronicle, Thietmar describes the Christianization of Pomerania. In 1000, during the congress of Gniezno, Reinbern was appointed bishop of Kołobrzeg. Thietmar further wrote that Reinbern "destroyed the temples of the idols, he burnt them, and, after anointing four stone idols of their demons with holy chrism, he threw them into the lake and then blessed the water to cleanse it". Perhaps the passage in this message is about the sea god.

== Deities of uncertain status ==
- Chernobog and Belobog – alleged deities of bad fortune and good fortune.
- Diva – theonym mentioned by Sermon by Saint Gregory.
- Diy – theonym mentioned in Sermon and Revelation by the Holy Apostles. Possibly related to sky or rain.
- Hennil or Bendil – an agricultural deity mentioned by Thietmar.
- Yarilo – East Slavic ritual and ritual figure attested since the 18th century Interpreted as a deity of vegetation.
- Karna and Zhelya – assumed personifications of weeping for the dead among the East Slavs, appear in The Tale of Igor's Campaign.
- Kresnik – character in Slovenian folklore. Together with his brother, Trot, he flew in a golden chariot. He fought the Zhmij or Dragon in sky or on earth, who stole his cattle or abducted his wife. Identified with Perun.
- Kruh – a Polabian god. Perhaps related to Khors.
- Lel and Polel – alleged Polish divine twins first mentioned by Maciej Miechowita as counterparts of Castor and Pollux.
- *Ljutobog – hypothetical name of a Polabian deity. Reinhold Trautmann, on the basis of the Polabian village of Lutebuk, probably located on the island of Usedom, first attested in 1238, and which burned down in the 17th century, proposed the existence of a "harsh god" (luty "harsh") as opposed to the "white god".
- Nyja – Alleged Polish deity of death, compared to Pluto.
- Ognyena Maria – figure in East and South Slavic folklore. Sister of St. Elijah (Perun), associated with lightning and an arrow, her feast day was 17 July.
- Pereplut – theonym mentioned in Sermon by the Holy Father Saint John Chrysostom.
- Perperuna and Dodola – pagan folk festival celebrated in the Balkans that was used to bring rain. Some scholars suggest that the name of the festival originally may have been the name of a goddess, the wife of Perun.
- Pizamar – deity mentioned in the Knýtlinga saga. The exact reading of the name is unclear, which has led some scholars to suggest that the author understood the ordinary name as a theonym.
- Pogoda – alleged Polish weather goddess mentioned by Jan Długosz.
- Trot – character in Slovenian folklore. Together with his brother, Kresnik, he flew in a golden chariot. In one story, he decapitated Zhmij with a golden axe.
- Zelu – deity mentioned as worshipped by pagan Czechs mentioned by abbot Jan Neplach.
- Żywie – goddess mentioned by Jan Długosz.

== See also ==
- Outline of Slavic history and culture
- List of Slavic studies journals
- Supernatural beings in Slavic religion

== Bibliography ==
- Wejman, Grzegorz (2004). "Biskupstwa katolickie na Pomorzu Zachodnim od X wieku do 1945 r.". Wrocławski Przegląd Teologiczny. 12 (1): 139–156.
- Kempiński, Andrzej (1993). Słownik mitologii ludów indoeuropejskich. Poznań: SAWW. ISBN 9788385066910.
- Kropej, Monika (2012). "Supernatural Beings from Slovenian Myth and Folktales". Studia mythologica Slavica – Supplementa. Lublana. ISSN 1581-9744.
- Pitro, Martin; Vokáč, Petr (2002). Bohové dávných Slovanů (in Czech). Praga: ISV. ISBN 80-85866-91-9.
- Álvarez-Pedrosa, Juan Antonio (2012–2014). "¿Existió un dios eslavo Hennil?". Faventia (in Spanish). 34–36: 135–138. ISSN 2014-850X.
- Szyjewski, Andrzej (2003). Religia Słowian. Kraków: Wydawnictwo WAM. ISBN 83-7318-205-5.
- Gieysztor, Aleksander (2006). Mitologia Słowian. Warszawa: Wydawnictwa Uniwersytetu Warszawskiego. ISBN 978-83-235-0234-0.
- Strzelczyk, Jerzy (1998). Mity, podania i wierzenia dawnych Słowian. Poznań: Dom Wydawniczy Rebis. ISBN 83-7120-688-7.
- Brückner, Aleksander (1985). Mitologia słowiańska. Warszawa: Państwowe Wydawnictwo Naukowe. ISBN 8301062452.
- Téra, Michal (2009). Perun: Bůh hromovládce (in Czech). Červený Kostelec: Pavel Mervart. ISBN 978-80-86818-82-5.
- Váňa, Zdeněk (1990). Svět slovanských bohů a démonů (in Czech). Praga: Panorama. ISBN 80-7038-187-6.
- Borissoff, Constantine Leo (2014). "Non-Iranian origin of the Eastern-Slavonic god Xŭrsŭ/Xors". Studia Mythologica Slavica. 17: 9–36. doi:10.3986/sms.v17i0.1491. ISSN 1581-128X.
- Gorbachov, Yaroslav (2017). "What Do We Know about *Čьrnobogъ and *Bělъ Bogъ?". Russian History. 44 (2–3): 209–242. doi:10.1163/18763316-04402011. ISSN 1876-3316.
- Kolankiewicz, Leszek (1999). Dziady. Teatr święta zmarłych. Gdańsk: Słowo/Obraz Terytoria. ISBN 8387316393.
- Witkowski, Teodolius (1970). "Mythologisch motivierte altpolabische Ortsnamen". Zeitschrift für Slawistik (in German). 15 (1). Berlin: Akademie Verlag: 368–385. doi:10.1524/slaw.1970.15.1.368.
- Álvarez-Pedrosa, Juan Antonio (2021). Sources of Slavic Pre-Christian Religion. Leiden: Koninklijke Brill. ISBN 978-90-04-44138-5.
- Peroš, Zrinka; Ivon, Katarina; Bacalja, Robert (2007). "More u pričama Ivane Brlić-Mažuranić" [Sea in tales of Ivana Brlić-Mažuranić]. Magistra Iadertina (in Croatian). 2 (2). University of Zadar Department for the training of teachers and educators of preschool children. doi:10.15291/magistra.880. ISSN 1849-0018.
- Vilkul, Tetyana Leonidivna (2015). Літопис і хронограф. Студії з домонгольського київського літописання (PDF) (in Ukrainian). Kyiv: Institute of History of Ukraine. ISBN 978-966-02-7554-6.
- Zarubin, L. A. (1971). Сходные изображения солнца и зорь у индоарийцев и славян [Similar images of the sun and dawns among the Indo-Aryans and Slavs]. Советское славяноведение [Soviet Slavic Studies] (in Russian). 6. Moscow: Наука: 70–76. Archived from the original on 11 April 2012.
