= Pizamar =

Slavic deity

- Venerated in: Polabian religion
- Major cult center: Asund/Zagard
- Texts: Knýtlinga saga
- Region: Rügen

Pizamar (Old Icelandic Pizamarr) is a Slavic deity worshipped on Rügen. His statue was overthrown by the Danes in 1168 together with statues of other gods on Rügen. He is mentioned only in Knýtlinga saga, which, however, does not give the functions of the god or his image. Nowadays his name may be transcribed into English as Pachomir, Pachemir.

The Gesta Danorum and Knýtlinga saga describe the conquest of Rügen by the Danes. Both sources describe the destruction of the temple of Svetovit on Arkona, then the temples of Ruyevit, Porevit and Porenut in Charenza. The Knýtlinga saga, however, mentions further conquests, which are no longer described by the Gesta Danorum, and mentions the god Pizamar, who was worshipped in the nearby gord of Asund, nowadays identified with Zagard nearby the Black Lake:

The fifth god was called Pizamar. He was in Asund, such was the name of the place. This god was also burned. There was also a god called Tjarnaglofi, he was their god of victory, and he went with them into battle. He had a silver moustache. It was he who resisted longest, but on the third winter they captured him. And on that journey they Christianized five thousand.

Old Icelandic original text
Et fimmta goð hét Pizamarr; hann var á Ásund, svá heitir einn staðr; hann var ok brendr. Þá hét ok Tjarnaglófi, hann var sigrgoð þeirra, ok fór hann í herfarar með þeim; hann hafði kanpa af silfri; hann helz lengst við, en þó fengu þeir hann á þriðja vetri þar eptir; en þeir kristnuðu alls á landinu V þúsundir í þeirri ferð.

There is general agreement that the Icelandic -marr corresponds to the Slavic suffix -mir (Proto-Slavic *-mirъ) found in many Slavic given names, which was adapted to the Old Icelandic phonetic system, but controversy arose over the reading of the first part of the theonym. The first letter was generally read as b or v (w): Aleksander Brückner read the name as Wszemir or Wyszemir, while others read it as Bezmir or Bezmiar, Běsomar, Bisomir, Bisomar, Bjessamar, Pečimir, and also as a continuation of the Proto-Slavic *bez(ъ)měrъ "unlimited strength".

Such etymologies, however, have drawbacks. Slavic words beginning with ⟨v⟩ in Old Icelandic were also written by initial v/w, cf. Old Icelandic warta ← Slavic *vor(o)ta, OI Waldimarr ← Slavic *Vol(o)dimār, etc., and words beginning with ⟨b⟩ were also written with an initial b, cf. OI Burisleif ← Slavic *Boleslavъ. Furthermore, Slavic words beginning with ⟨p⟩ were always written with an initial p, cf. OI polydi ← Slavic *poľudje, OI Palteskija ← Slavic *Polteskъ. Readings that contain an initial B or V/W should be considered unjustified.

According to Michał Łuczynski, the correct reading of the Slavic sound of the theonym is simple. In Old Icelandic borrowings from Slavic the letter z can reflect Slavic consonant ⟨c⟩, cf. OI dyfliza ← Slavic *tīmīnica, ⟨š⟩ (Note: Similar to English sh.) cf. OI kaza ← Slavic *kaša, or possibly ⟨s⟩. This would allow one to reconstruct the segment as *Pica-, *Piša-, or *Pisa-. In loans to Old Icelandic, the Slavic vowel ⟨o⟩ was sometimes rendered as a after a consonant, cf. OI sabaló ← Slavic *sobolji, OI taparöks ← Slavic *topor-, etc.; this would allow reconstruction of the segment as *Pico-, *Pišo-, or *Piso-. An analysis of Slavic given names loans shows that the letter i in Old Icelandic, in addition to corresponding to Slavic ⟨i⟩ and ⟨y⟩, also corresponds to ⟨ě⟩ (Note: Similar to English ie, ye.), cf. OI Zytzebor (with the exchange i ↔ y) ← Old Polabian *Sieciebor. This would allow reconstruction of the theonym as *Pěcomirъ, *Pěšomirъ, or *Pěsomirъ. The forms with ⟨s⟩ or ⟨š⟩ must be rejected, since there are no attestations of this type of names in Slavic languages. Instead, the materials contain names similar to the form *Pěcomirъ, such as the Moravian given name Pačemirъ (9th century), or the Old Slovene female given name Pačemira (9th-10th century). The Polabian theonym would thus read *Pěčomirъ and would be a phonetic variant of the name Proto-Slavic given name *Pačemirъ with a → e apophony and an exchange of -e- for -o-, while ⟨č⟩ (Note: Similar to English ch.) became devoiced to ⟨c⟩ in Old Icelandic. The name *Pačemirъ is composed of the Proto-Slavic *pače "more (used to form the comparative degree)" and the suffix *-mirъ, and the whole name would mean "more peaceful", "may he be (more) peaceful", "may he have more peace (mir)", and would be a wishing name.

According to Łuczynski, this name may have referred to Svetovit (-Ruyevit), which was meant to alleviate the impetuous nature of the god. Henryk Łowmiański, on the other hand, decided that it was the name of an "illustrious deceased" who was accidentally considered a deity by the chronicler.

== Bibliography ==
- Alvarez-Pedroza, Juan Antonio (2021). Sources of Slavic Pre-Christian Religion. Leiden: Koninklijke Brill. ISBN 978-90-04-44138-5.
- Łuczyński, Michał (2020). Bogowie dawnych Słowian. Studium onomastyczne. Kielce: Kieleckie Towarzystwo Naukowe. ISBN 978-83-60777-83-1.
- Strzelczyk, Jerzy (1998). Mity, podania i wierzenia dawnych Słowian. Poznań: Dom Wydawniczy Rebis. ISBN 83-7120-688-7.
- Brückner, Aleksander (1985). Mitologia słowiańska. Warszawa: Państwowe Wydawnictwo Naukowe. ISBN 8301062452.
- Łowmiański, Henryk (1979). Religia Słowian i jej upadek, w. VI-XII. Warszawa: Państwowe Wydawnictwo Naukowe. ISBN 83-01-00033-3.
