= Chernoglav =

God of victory and war worshipped in Rügen

Chernoglav or Chernoglov (Old Icelandic: Tjarnaglófi) is the god of victory and war worshipped in Rügen, probably in the town of Jasmund, mentioned together with Svetovit, Rugievit, Turupid, Puruvit and Pizamar in the Knýtlinga saga.

The fifth god was called Pizamar from a place called Jasmund, and was destroyed by fire, There was also Tjarnaglófi, their god of victory who went with them on military campaigns. He had a moustache of silver and resisted longer than the others but they managed to get him there years later. Altogether, they christened five thousand on this expedition.

Old Icelandic original text

Et fimmta goð hét Pizamarr; hann var á Ásund, svá heitir einn staðr; hann var ok brendr. Þá hét ok Tjarnaglófi, hann var sigrgoð þeirra, ok fór hann í herfarar með þeim; hann hafði kanpa af silfri; hann helz lengst við, en þó fengu þeir hann á þriðja vetri þar eptir; en þeir kristnuðu alls á landinu V þúsundir í þeirri ferð.

— Knýtlinga saga

Aleksander Gieysztor and Andrzej Szyjewski read the name as "Chernoglav/Chernoglov" (Polish: Czarnogłów). Aleksander Brückner, on the other hand, thought that the only correct reading of the name was "Triglav". Jerzy Strzelczyk notes that the warlike character of a god may speak in favor of the "Triglav" reading, but the warlike character was a feature common to many of the Polabian and Pomeranian gods. Henryk Łowmiński decided that Chernogłów is "the cemetery transformation of the Chernobog", and Leszek Moszyński proposed a read "T'arnogłowy" (from Proto-Slavic *tьrnъ, "thorn") meaning "with a head crowned with thorns", which is to refer to Jesus' crown of thorns and be a Christian influence on the late Polabian paganism. According to Yaroslav Gorbachov, the statue of Chernoglav could in fact be a statue of Yarovit or Perun, but he also states that source about Chernoglav might be potential source about Chernobog.
