= Kresnik =

Kresnik or Krsnik may refer to:

== People ==
- Johann Kresnik (b. 1939), Austrian choreographer
- Julius or Ludger Will Kresnik, characters in Tales of Xillia 2
- Dora Krsnik (b. 1992), Croatian handball player

== Other ==
- Kresnik Ahtreide, a character in Wild Arms 4
- Kresnik Award, a Slovenian literary award
- Kresnik (deity), a Slavic deity
- Krsnik (vampire hunter), a Croatian/Slovenian vampire hunter
