= Strzelczyk =

Strzelczyk is a gender-neutral Polish surname. Notable people with the surname include:

- Jerzy Strzelczyk (born 1941), Polish historian
- Justin Strzelczyk (1968–2004), American football offensive tackle
