= Stoislav I =

Possible progenitor of the princes of Putbus

Stoislav I (German: Stoislaw I.) (died after 1193) may have been the progenitor of the aristocratic House of Putbus. According to the Pomeranian chronicler Thomas Kantzow, Stoislav was a son of Prince Ratislaus of Rügen (Ratze). Kantzow's assertion is not however provable, so that it is also questionable whether he was actually a brother of Princes Tetzlav and Jaromar I.

== Literature ==
- Leopold von Zedlitz-Neukirch: Neues preussisches Adelslexicon. Vol. 4, Gebrüder Reichenbach, Leipzig, 1837, S. 65–66 (Digitalisat).
- Theodor Pyl (1888). "Putbus, von". Allgemeine Deutsche Biographie (in German). Vol. 26. Leipzig: Duncker & Humblot. pp. 738–742.
- Martin Schoebel (2003). "Putbus, Herren". Neue Deutsche Biographie (in German). Vol. 21. Berlin: Duncker & Humblot. pp. 16–18.
- Ursula Scheil: Zur Genealogie der einheimischen Fürsten von Rügen. Veröffentl. der Historischen Kommission für Pommern, Reihe V, Heft 1. Köln/Graz 1962
