= Charenza =

Castle on the island of Rügen, Germany

Charenza, also Karentia or Karenz, later also Gharense, was a medieval Slavic burgwall on the island of Rügen in the Baltic Sea. It was the administrative centre of the Rani tribe and of the Principality of Rugia. Today, the remnants are called Venz Castle (German: Venzer Burgwall).

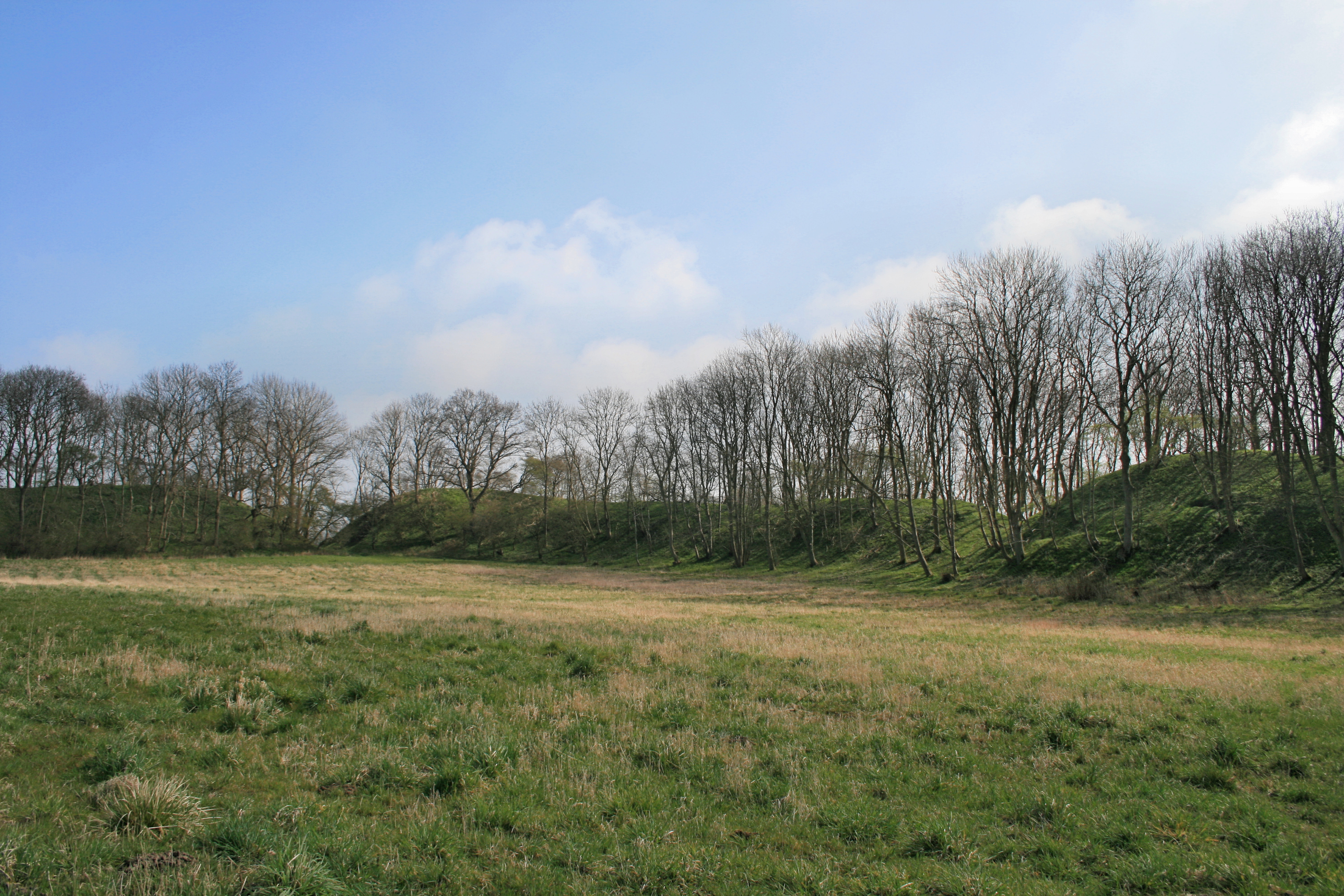
The remnants of Charenza near Venz

== Name ==
The name Charenza (also spelt Karentia or Karenz) may be derived from an old personal name, Chareta, or from the Rani word for "root", Koreta. In its original form, the name was Korenitsa.

== Temples ==
Charenza was not only the administrative hub of the Rani tribe, but also a religious centre with the temples of Rugievit, Porevit and Porenut. The main religious centre of the Rani, however, was Arkona on Wittow.

== Danish conquest ==
In 1168, King Valdemar I of Denmark and his archbishop Absalon captured Arkona. Charenza surrendered a few days later after negotiations with the Rugian princes Tetzlav and Jaromar I. The temples were destroyed, the princes agreed to become Danish vassals and the population adopted the Christian faith. In 1180, the administrative centre of the Principality of Rugia was moved to Rugard (today Bergen auf Rügen, just a few kilometres to the southeast).

== Records ==
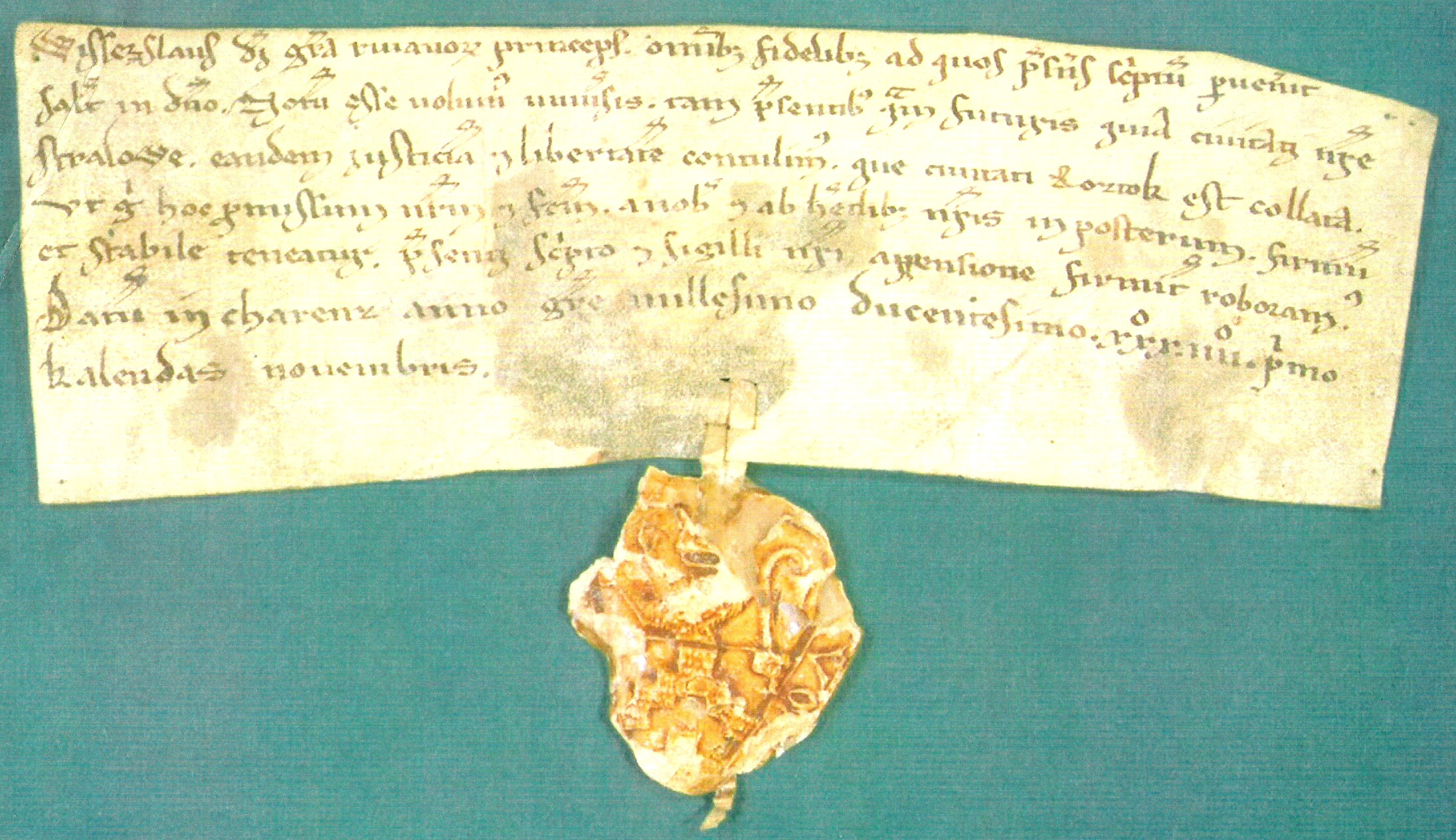
1234 document granting Lübeck law to Stralsund, signed in Charenza

In the 12th century, Charenza was mentioned by Saxo Grammaticus and Helmold von Bosau.

The last records are from the early 13th century. When the Danish king raised money to build 12 churches on Rügen, one of them was the capelle nostre in Charenz, which in 1232 was granted the village of Gagern as a fief. In 1234, when the Rugian prince Vitslav I granted Lübeck law to Stralsund, the document was signed in Charenza. The last record mentioning Charenza was in 1237. In the 14th century, "Gharense" was mentioned as belonging to the parish of Gingst.

== Coordinates ==
Older research located Charenza at Garz (54°18′51″N 13°20′50″E), while newer studies locate Charenza near Venz (Trent community, 54°30′7″N 13°19′0″E), the supposed site of Gharense, which also fits the hints given in the Gesta Danorum of Saxo Grammaticus for Charenza's location.
