= Rugiaevit =

God of the Slavic Rani

- God of war
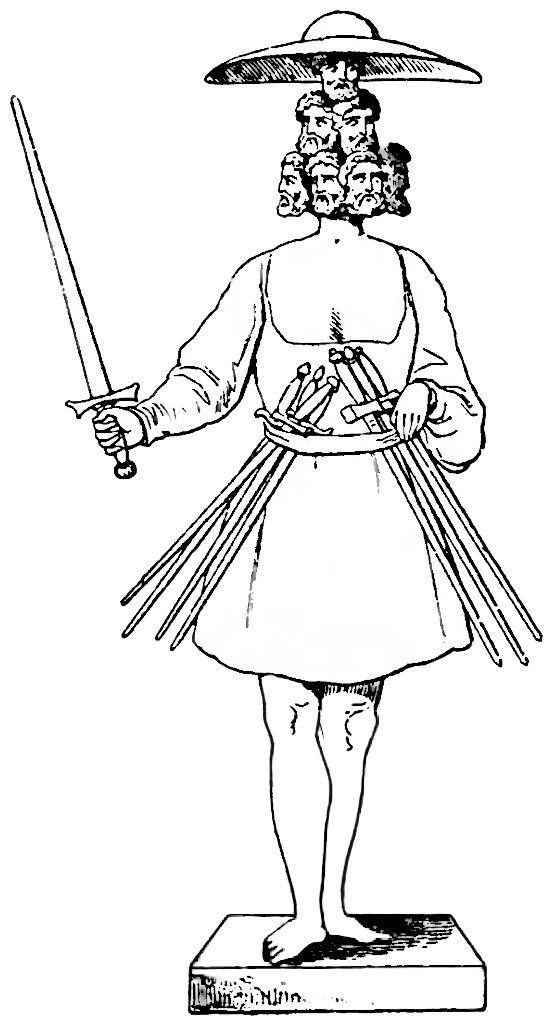
- Depiction of Rugieavit by Adolf Bastian, 1888
- Other names: Rugievit, Ruyevit
- Major cult center: Charenza
- Weapons: 8 swords
- Animals: Swallows

Rugiaevit, Rugievit (Latin: Rugiaeuit) or Ruyevit is a god of the Slavic Rani worshipped on Rügen, mentioned in only two sources: Gesta Danorum and in Knýtlinga saga. His temple, along with those of Porevit and Porenut, was located in the gord of Charenza, probably today's Garz. The statue of him had seven faces, seven swords at his belt and an eighth one in his hand. Under his lips was a nest of swallows. Mostly associated with the sphere of war, but also sexual.

"Private", from the point of view of rulers, cult of Rugiaevit competed with the "public" and theocratic cult of Svetovit of Arkona.

== Sources ==
The first source to mention Rugiaevit is the Gesta Danorum by Saxo Grammaticus. Saxo describes when, after Arkona was captured by the Danish king Valdemar I, its inhabitants made an agreement with him, which encourages the inhabitants of Charenza to make a similar agreement and surrender the city without a fight. Saxo describes how the stronghold had three temples dedicated to Rugiaevit, Porevit and Porenut and the destruction of the idol of Rugiaevit in June 1168:

The main temple was located in the middle of its vestibule, but both were closed off by purple cloths instead of walls, the roof supported only on separate columns. So the servants, moving aside the vestibule’s decoration, finally laid hands on the temple’s interior curtains. Having drawn those aside, an idol made of oak wood could be seen from all sides; they called this idol Rugiaevit, which provoked great ridicule due to its hideousness. For the swallows, which had built their nests under the contours of its mouth, had accumulated on its chest thick mounds of excrement. Worthy god, whose likeness was so dirtily stained by some birds! Moreover, on its head were seven human-like faces, all of which were covered on their tops by a single skull. And the maker had managed to put together on one of its sides the same number of authentic swords, with their scabbards, hanging from a single belt, and an eighth unsheathed sword which it held in its right hand. This sword, put in the fist, was very firmly held in place by an iron nail, and it could not be removed from the hand without cutting the hand off, which provided the pretext to dismember it. The statue was thicker than the usual human body, and the height as well, in truth, such that Absalon, on tiptoes, had trouble reaching the chin with the ax he usually carried. They believed that this god, gifted with strength almost matching that of Mars, was in charge of war. Nothing about this idol was pleasing to the eye, his features deformed by the ugliness of rough engravings.

Latin original text
Maius fanum uestibuli sui medio continebatur, sed ambo parietum loco purpura claudebantur, tecti fastigio solis dumtaxat columnis imposito. Itaque ministri, direpto uestibuli cultu, tandem manus ad interiora fani uelamina porrexerunt. Quibus amotis, factum quercu simulacrum, quod Rugiaeuitum uocabant, ab omni parte magno cum deformitatis ludibrio spectandum patebat. Nam hirundines, quae sub oris eius lineamentis nidos molitae fuerant, in eiusdem pectus crebras stercorum sordes congesserant. Dignum numen, cuius effigies tam deformiter a uolucribus foedaretur. Praeterea in eius capite septem humanae similitudinis facies consedere, quae omnes unius uerticis superficie claudebantur. Totidem quoque ueros gladios cum uaginis uni cingulo appensos eius lateri artifex conciliauerat, octauum in dextra destrictum tenebat. Hunc pugno insertum firmissimo nexu ferreus clauus astrinxerat nec manui nisi praecisae euelli poterat; quae res truncandae eius occasio exstitit. Spissitudo illi supra humani corporis habitum erat, longitudo uero tanta, ut Absalon, supra primam pedum partem consistens, aegre mentum securicula, quam manu gestare consueuerat, aequaret. Hoc numen, perinde ac Martis uiribus praeditum, bellis praeesse crediderant. Nihil in hoc simulacro iucundum uisentibus fuit, lineamentis impoliti caelaminis deformitate sordentibus.

Then, after overthrowing the idols of Porevit and Porenut, Bishop Absalon ordered all three to be taken outside the town to be burned there so as not to expose the village to fire. Saxo here describes a superstition related to sexual acts, but it is not clear with which god this superstition is associated:

... For that reason they were asked to take the statues out of the city, but they refused for a long time, because they feared that they were going to lose mobility in the limbs that they used to comply with the order, as the god would demand punishment for it, and they tried to excuse their disobedience with religion. Finally, convinced by the warning of Absalon to spurn the power of a god who could not help itself, having accepted the expectation of impunity, they quickly obeyed his order. And it is not surprising that they were afraid of the power of those gods, remembering that they had punished their sexual transgressions many times. For, in effect, in this city the men would lay with the women joined in sexual congress in the manner of dogs and they could not separate themselves no matter how hard they tried, sometimes both, fastened to posts on opposite sides, would exhibit before the people the ridiculous spectacle of their strange union.

The same information is then given by Knýtlinga saga, which lists Rugiaevit in the distorted form Rinvit.

== Interpretations ==
There are two ways to read this theonym. The name Rugiaevit is most often translated as "lord, ruler of Rügen". Often scholars propose to read the name as Ruyevit; Aleksander Gieysztor suggests combining the first part of this reading with the root ru- existing in such words as řuti "to roar", ruja "roar of deer", "estrous, heat" (as well as "fertility"), which occurs in the Old Russian word rujenь – a term for one of the autumn months that falls during the time of the estrous cycle (cf. Czech říjen, Bulgarian руен (ruen), Serbo-Croatian ру̑јан, rujan). Lubor Niederle, assuming the phonetic similarity of Ruyevit and Yarovit, concluded that the two gods were identical. The suffix -vit translates as "lord, ruler"; it is less often compared with the word vitędzь due to the borrowing of this word from Germanic languages (cf. viking).

The functions of the god remain a matter of debate. Saxo primarily regards Rugiaevit as a war god – the equivalent of the Roman Mars. According to Saxo, one of the Charenza gods, probably Rugiaevit, was associated with punishing sexual intercourse, perhaps near the temple, with vaginismus. According to Gieysztor, Ruyevit was an incarnation of Perun, and links warlike qualities, etymology ("heat", 'fertility'), and punishment for sexual intercourse, with the Vedic Indra, who also combines warlike and sexual functions.

The meaning of the seven faces is unclear. Comparative studies suggest that polycephaly is associated with cosmological ideas: the duality of nature, the threefold or sevenfold vertical system, or the fourfold horizontal system. Gieysztor noted the similarity to the eastern Finno-Ugric myth about seven brothers turning into birds, but as he noted, it is unclear how this motif would have made its way to Rügen.

Swallows, which caused the Danes to laugh, are sometimes called "God's birds" and among the Slavs are considered the harbinger of spring and the personification of souls, and this would tie Ruyevit to spring as well.

According to Jacek Banaszkiewicz, a Polish professor of medieval history, the Charenza gods should not be viewed as three different, "random" gods, but as a specific set of deities. He notes that during the Middle Ages, princely and royal authorities chose as their capital cities or towns where the largest cult centers were located, and cites Kyiv or Uppsala as examples. In the temple at Uppsala, a trinity consisting of Thor, Odin, and Freyr was worshipped. Each of the gods, according to Georges Dumézil's trifunctional hypothesis, was responsible for a particular area, fundamental for the existence of the society: Thor was the most powerful god, sat on the middle throne, was responsible for the weather, and thus for the harvest, and is also the thunderer, Odin was responsible for war, and Freyr for peace, prosperity, and pleasure. Banaszkiewicz notes, however, that there are often shifts in competence between the first two gods. In the case of the Rugian trinity, however, he offers a different interpretation. On the basis of comparative mythology, he considers Rugiaevit to be the chief god of the Rani, as evidenced by the most magnificent temple in the middle of the castle, a purple color, statue made of oak, who leads the battle and is the ruler of Rügen and the Rugian community. On the other hand, he considers Porevit and Porenut as divine twins who complement the chief deity with their universal qualities. This interpretation is supported by the fact that chief deities in other religions are also sometimes worshipped together with divine twins (where the chief god is the father of the twins). A similar view was expressed by Gieysztor, who considered Ruyevit to be a local hypostasis of Perun.

== Bibliography ==
- Sobolevskij, A. (1928–1929). "Zametki po slavjanskoj mifologii. Po povodu truda prof. L. Niderle: Slovanské starožitnosti". Slavia - časopis pro slovanskou filologii (in Czech). 7. Prague: Česká grafická unie: 174–178.
- Szyjewski, Andrzej (2003). Religia Słowian. Kraków: Wydawnictwo WAM. ISBN 83-7318-205-5.
- Gieysztor, Aleksander (2006). Mitologia Słowian. Warsaw: Wydawnictwa Uniwersytetu Warszawskiego. ISBN 978-83-235-0234-0.
- Banaszkiewicz, Jacek (1996). "Pan Rugii - Rugiewit i jego towarzysze z Gardźca: Porewit i Porenut (Saxo Gramatyk, Gesta Danorum XIV, 39,38-41)". In Kurnatowska, Zofia (ed.). Słowiańszczyzna w Europie średniowiecznej. Vol. 1. Wrocław: WERK. pp. 75–82. ISBN 83-901964-7-6.
- Álvarez-Pedrosa, Juan Antonio (2021). Sources of Slavic Pre-Christian Religion. Leiden: Koninklijke Brill. ISBN 978-90-04-44138-5.
