= Atepomarus =

Deity in Celtic Gaul

Atepomarus or Atepomaros in Celtic Gaul was a healing god from Mauvières (Indre). Apollo was associated with this god in the form Apollo Atepomarus.

At some of Apollo's healing sanctuaries (as at Sainte-Sabine, Burgundy) small figurines of horses were associated with him.

== Names and etymology ==
The title also appears as Atepomerus.

Scholarship suggests the name is a compound of at- (intensifier), -epo- (the Celtic word for "horse") and -marus ("large, great"). Thus, the epithet is sometimes translated as "Great Horseman" or "possessing a great horse".

Pierre-Yves Lambert rejects his connection with horses and suggests an etymology based on *ad-tepo, related to 'protection, refuge'.

== Role ==
=== As founder ===
A character named Atepomarus appears with a Momoros (fr) as a pair of Celtic kings and founders of Lugdunum. They escape from Sereroneus and arrive at a hill. Momorus, who had skills in augury, sees a murder of crows and names the hill Lougodunum, after the crows. This myth is reported in the works of Klitophon of Rhodes and in Pseudo-Plutarch's De fluviis.

=== As a theonym ===
The name appears as a theonym attached to Graeco-Roman deities Apollo and Mercurius. An inscription of Apollo Atepomarus was found in Mauvières, tied to the Gallic tribe of the Bituriges.

== Bibliography ==
- Dictionary of Celtic Myth and Legend. Miranda Green. Thames and Hudson Ltd. London. 1997
- Animals in Celtic Life and Myth, Miranda Green, Routledge.
