= Ratislaus the Wise =

Ratislaus the Wise of Rügen (German: also Ratze, born before 1105, died 1141) was King of Rügen or Prince of the Rugians (or Rani).

He was a son of Vartislav (German: Wartislaw). His grandfather was Kruto (also: Crito); his great grandfather was Grines (also: Grimmus). Ratislaus fought the prince of the Obotrites, Henry, without success.

His wife is believed to have been the sister of Prince Mitzlav of Gützkow, who was converted to Christianity in 1128 by Bishop Otto of Bamberg.

His offspring were:

- Tetzlav (died 1170), also known as Tezlaw', Tetzlaw, or Tetislaw, who from 1162 to 1170 was first King, later Prince of Rügen.
- Stoislav I (died after 1193), also known as Stoislav of Putbus (Stoislaw von Putbus), the father of the House of Putbus (died 1854)
- Jaromar I (1170-1217), Prince of Rügen

The church in Vilmitz may have been built by Stoislav I, whose inclusion as the brother of Tezlaw and Jaromar is vague. In the first documented mention in 1249, it states that the parish of Vylmenytze belonged to the estate of Borante de Borantenhagen and had already been founded by his ancestors. By 1351, the church in Vilmnitz was being mentioned as the burial site of the House of Putbus.

== See also ==
- Jaromarsburg
- List of princes of Rugen
