= Kwaczała =

- Village
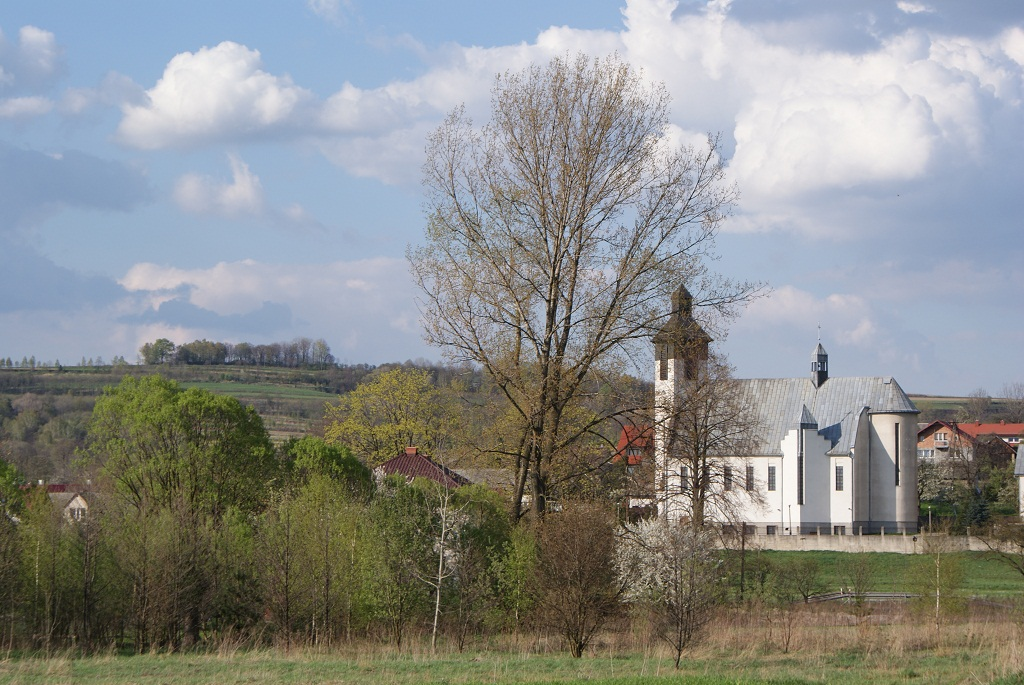
- Church of Saint Stanislaus Kostka

- Location within Poland
- Coordinates: 50°4′15″N 19°30′17″E
- Country: Poland
- Voivodeship: Lesser Poland
- County: Chrzanów
- Gmina: Alwernia

Population
  - Total: 1,857
- Website: http://www.kwaczala.pl/

Kwaczała [kfaˈt͡ʂawa] is a village in the administrative district of Gmina Alwernia, within Chrzanów County, Lesser Poland Voivodeship, in southern Poland.

== Notable people ==
- Stanisław Urbańczyk, Polish linguist
