= Danish Crusade =

Danish Crusade may refer to:

- Siege of Dobin of 1147
- Battle of Schmilau of 1093
- Siege of Arkona of 1168, part of the Northern Crusades
- Battle of Julin Bridge of ca. 1170, against Pomerania
- Danish Crusade of 1191 to Finland
- Danish Crusade of 1202 to Finland, led by Anders Sunesen
- Danish conquest of Pomerelia of 1205
- Danish Crusade of 1206 to Ösel (Saaremaa), see Livonian Crusade#War against Saaremaa (1206–61)
- Danish Crusade of 1219 to Estonia, see Battle of Lyndanisse
- Danish Campaigns to Novgorod of 1241
