= Battle of Julin Bridge =

12th century Danish naval and land battle against Pomeranians

The Battle at Julin Bridge
- Part of the Danish Crusades
Date	1170
Location	Wolin, Poland
Result	Danish victory

Belligerents
Denmark	Pomeranians

Commanders and leaders
Valdemar I Absalon	Bogislaw I Casimir

Strength
~1,560 men (a third probably cavalry); Uncertain number of ships, but probably 13	~7,200–10,000 men 60 ships

Casualties and losses
Minor losses in men No ships lost	10–20 ships crashed, sunk or burnt and 7 ships captured ~3,000–7,000 Wends dead Army of Bogislaw scattered Entire camp of Casimir looted

The Battle at Julin Bridge was a naval and land conflict fought around 1170 between the kingdom of Denmark and the Pomeranians. It took place in modern-day Wolin, Poland. The Danish fleet was led by Valdemar I and Absalon and fought the army and fleet of Casimir and Bogislaw I.

== Background ==
During the Danish Civil War, Wendish raiders, in alliance with Sweyn III, attacked central and western Denmark. After Sweyn's defeat and beheading at the Battle of Grathe Heath, his cousin Valdemar I of Denmark assumed the Danish throne, and bishop Absalon repulsed a Wendish raid on Zealand. With the lands of both Denmark and its allies harassed by these raids, Valdemar and Absalon formed an alliance. With Absalon's help, Valdemar I began to reorganize war-ravaged Denmark and the Danish armed forces by reinventing Viking tactics that were better optimized for fighting heavy cavalry and carrying out amphibious assaults. In the late 1160s Valdemar and Absalon conquered Rügen, and used the island as a base to launch further raids.

== Expedition ==
The Danish fleet sailed deeper into Wendish territory, growing bold and sailing down the Oder. They raided and plundered the villages and towns they passed. They stopped raiding upon reaching Kammin, where they decided to return to Denmark.

Absalon pushed out into the open sea through the eastern gap at Dziwnow. As they turned east so did the winds, which blew water from the shoals that lie there, so the ships could not pass. This is what the Wends under Casimir had counted on, using fifty ships to block the Danes' only exit at the Julin Bridge.

== Battle ==
When the Danes arrived at Julin bridge they were met by Casimir's fleet and army, recently reinforced by his brother Bogislaw. The Wends vastly outnumbered the Danes, as the coasts were said to be overcrowded with Wendish men.

The Danish soldiers and nobles berated Absalon in despair over the size of the Wendish forces. Valdemar stoutly defended his friend and said: "It ill becomes men and soldiers in an hour of need to belabour others with reproaches like a lot of women; and now I do not think that the man who has made so many good plans for us will fail to have one this time". Absalon did have a plan; He wanted to smuggle the Danish cavalry onto the shore, led by Valdemar. His most heavily armed men would be stationed at the seven leading vessels, so they could break through at the bridge.

Expecting victory, Casimir and his men feasted in celebration. The feasting Wends were interrupted by the Danish fleet's advance. The Wends hastily embarked onto their own vessels to go and prevent a breakthrough, and the army reassembled at the neck of the outlet from which they shot at the Danish force's frontline.

A reimagination of the Battle

The Wendish projectiles did little against the fully armoured Danish frontline, while the Danish archers assembled behind the frontline and rained arrows upon them, which sufficiently distracted the Wends. The Wends were then surprised to see the Danish cavalry crashing into their flank, routing their army. This caused the Wendish navy to panic and their numerical superiority became a burden as their ships crashed into each other in an attempt to flee. The Wends were either slain, scattered or hid behind the walls of their town with their camp looted.-->

== Aftermath ==
The Danes escaped after a victory so decisive that Valdemar would not need to deal with Wendish raiders for the rest of his rule. It laid the groundwork for the later conquests of his sons and successors. "The Danes not only escaped the trap but carried away much honour and booty; which shows that when swords are bared, nothing is to be taken as certain until they are bloodied."

== Sources ==
- Pratt, Fletcher (1950). The Third King. Sloane.
- Steenstrup, Johannes (1896–1907). Danmarks Riges Historie. historisk illustreret : Oldtiden og den ældre Middelalder. Det Nordiske Forlag. OCLC 872667934.
