= Krsnik (vampire hunter) =

Character of Slovenian mythology

In Slavic mythology, a krsnik (female: krsnica) or kresnik is a type of vampire hunter and a shaman whose spirit wanders from the body in the form of an animal. The krsnik turns into an animal at night to fight off the kudlak, his evil vampire antithesis, with the krsnik appearing as a white animal and the kudlak as a black one. The krsnik's soul leaves the body, either voluntarily or due to a higher power, to fight evil agents and ensure good harvest, health, and happiness.

The krsnik is taught magic by Vile (fairies), and in traditional medicine has the ability to heal people and cattle. However, due to the undocumented nature of oral tradition, it is difficult to determine with certainty how much of kresnik folklore originated from Slavic mythology, and how much arose from a separate shamanistic tradition. Some postulate the struggle between the kresnik and the kudlak reflects an earlier dualistic tradition inherited from Slavic polytheism; however, a struggle between two tribes of sorcerers over the fate of the harvest is a common mytheme among peoples of the northern Adriatic regardless of their ethnicity. A similar motif is found among the Romance inhabitants of nearby Friuli, who call their equivalent to the Slavic kresnici the Benandanti. After Christianization, the kresnik instead was claimed to have learned magic at the School of Black Magic in Babylon, yet retained benevolent traits as a generous and powerful friend of the poor.

The origin of the name may be from the word krst, which means "cross", and which in Serbia is the word for a stone sign denoting village boundaries. It may also be derived from the same root as the Slav word for "resurrection," so that the word itself means something approximating "resurrector."

Similar beliefs circulated among the Italian Benandanti cult.

== In popular culture ==
- In the novel, anime, and manga series Trinity Blood, a "Crusnik" is a vampire that feeds on the blood of other vampires. Lilith Sahl, Cain, Seth, and Abel Nightroad are Crusnik who are much more powerful than regular vampires, who have the bacillus kudlak. They all take different forms: Cain appears as an angel with white wings, even though he is the antagonist, whereas Abel appears slightly demonic with black wings and red eyes, while being the protagonist. Kudlak also appears in the series as a bacillus that is responsible for the creation of "normal" vampires.
- Kresnik and Kudlak are recurring characters in the Shin Megami Tensei series of video games.
- Kresnik is the name of a mythological hero in Tales of Xillia. A superweapon bearing the name "Lance of Kresnik" is a plot device. The sequel features one of the hero's descendants, named Ludger Will Kresnik. A plot-significant machine named Kudlak is also present.
- The main villain in Darkness Hunts by Keri Arthur is a male serial killer who believes he is a kresnik hunting down supposed kudlaks and murdering them.
- Kudlak appears as a card in the online collectible card game Shadowverse. The mechanics of the card allow copies of Kudlak to be placed in the player’s deck after his defeat, which mirrors the theme of Kudlak’s recurring return.

== See also ==
- Kresnik (deity)
- Vampire hunter
- Vedmak
- Wendigo-hunter
- Zduhać
