= Porevit =

Slavonic god

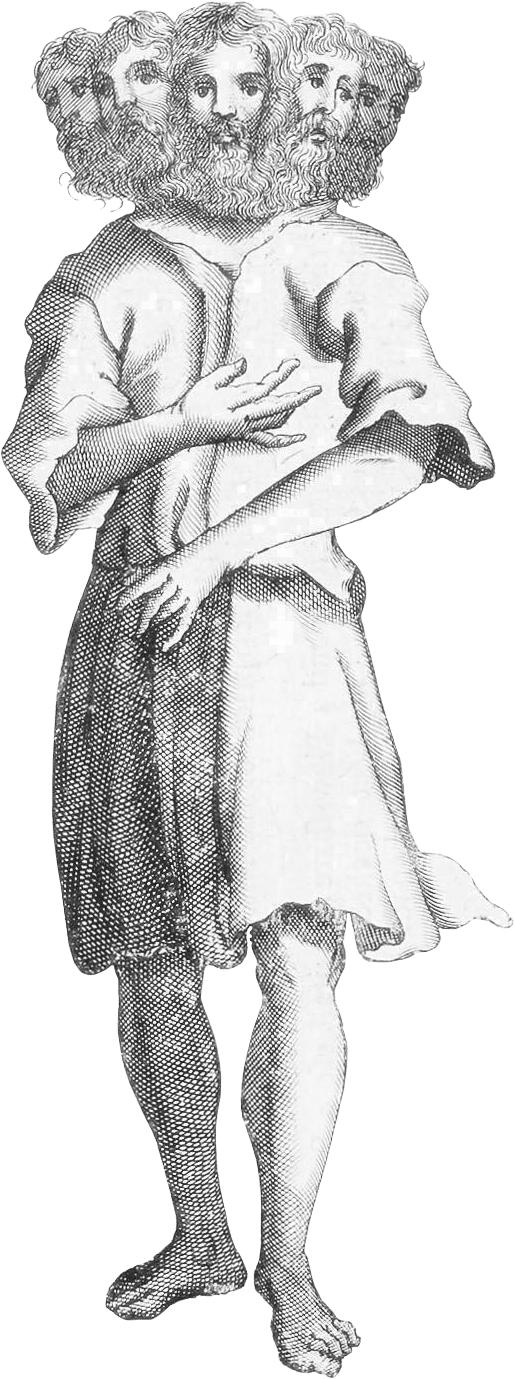
- Porevit in Britannia Antiqua Illustrata
- Major cult center: Charenza
- Region: Rugen

Porevit, Porovit or Borovit (Latin: Poreuit, Perevithus, Poreuith, Porevithum, Poreuithũ, Borveit) is a Slavic god with unknown functions mentioned in only two sources: Gesta Danorum and in Knýtlinga saga. The only historical information about him is a description of a statue of him with five faces and no weapons.

== Sources ==
The first source to mention Porevit is the Gesta Danorum by Saxo Grammaticus. Saxo describes when, after Arkona was captured by the Danish king Valdemar I, its inhabitants made an agreement with him, which encourages the inhabitants of Charenza to make a similar agreement and surrender the city without a fight. Saxo describes that in this gord (stronghold) there were three temples dedicated to Rugiaevit, Porevit and Porenut. After the destruction of the temple and the idol of Rugiaevit by the Danes, Saxo writes:

And not satisfied with its destruction, a group of auxiliary troops turned greedily to the statue of Porevit, which was worshiped in the temple next door. This idol had five heads, but had been sculpted without decorations on its sides. Having torn down this idol, they went to the temple of Porenutius. This statue, represented with four faces, had a fifth face embedded in the body, whose forehead it touched with its left hand, and the chin with its right. This statue fell under the blows of the axes wielded by the servants.

Latin original text
Nec eius excidio contentae satellitum manus ad Poreuitum simulacrum, quod in proxima aede colebatur, auidius porriguntur. Id quinque capitibus consitum, sed armis uacuum fingebatur. Quo succiso, Porenutii templum appetitur. Haec statua, quattuor facies repraesentans, quintam pectori insertam habebat, cuius frontem laeua, mentum dextera tangebat. Haec famulorum ministerio securibus icta concidit.

The same information is then given by the Knýtlinga saga, which lists Porevit in the distorted form Puruvit.

== Etymologies and interpretations ==
=== From *pora "strength" ===
The first part is usually connected with the word pora in its original, Proto-Slavic (*pora) meaning "push, thrust", "force, effort, full strength", "period of effort, hard work". In the context of this etymology, the name is read as Porevit or Porovit. Supporters of the reading Porovit cite, for example, the Russian word порови́тый, porovityy.

According to Jacek Banaszkiewicz, a Polish professor of medieval history, the three Charenza deities are not a "random" group of deities, but a group of deities that patronize areas fundamental to the existence of society. He considers Rugiaevit as the chief god, who patronizes war and the community, and Porevit and Porenut as divine twins, who complement the chief deity with their universal characteristics. Banaszkiewicz points out that a common feature of divine twins is the repetition of the first part of the name or the second part of the name; according to him, Porevit and Porenut share the first part (pora). He also points out that twins often have contradictory features; Porevit is considered a "positive" twin whose name should be understood as "Lord of strength, Lord who can cope with everything", while Porenut is considered a "negative" twin and translates his name as "Lord in need of support", reading the suffix -nut as -nud and connecting it with the Old Polish nuda and the German Nut meaning "need, compulsion". Banaszkiewicz also points to the fact that they both have five faces, two less than Rugiaevit, with Porenut having only four faces on his head, and the fifth one he holds with his hands on his chest, which according to him may indicate that his character's importance is diminished in relation to Porevit. It may also be important that the right hand supports the fifth face, while the left hand holds it by the forehead. Andrzej Szyjewski is also in favor of combining the first part of both Porevit and Porenut with the word pora.

According to Roman Jakobson, the *per/*por root exchange would link Porovit to Perun.

=== From *borъ "forest" ===
Less common readings of the name include Borovit "Lord of the forest". There is an assumption that both Saxo and the author of the Knýtlinga saga used one common, unpreserved source when describing the deities of Charenza. The Porevit/Porovit reading is supported by the fact that in Saxo's Latin, and Old Icelandic, the Slavic initial ⟨p⟩ was always rendered as p, but it is possible that this theonym was deformed before it found its way into the Gesta Danorum and Saga. The notation with p appears in only one manuscript (the Danish copy) of the Gesta Danorum, which became the basis for the Paris edition of 1514, which became the basis for all later editions. However, Thomas Kantzow in 1538 gives the Borveit notation. Kantzon probably relied on an unpreserved manuscript kept in Pomerania or Rostock, where it originated. Additionally, David Chytraeus, who was a professor at the University of Rostock, gives the notation Barovit in his Chronicon Saxoniae which may indicate that there was a copy (or copies) that used a different notation system than the Danish manuscripts. It should also be noted, knowledge of the Paris edition is only demonstrated by Peter Albina of the late 16th century, who is the first to quote the Poreuit notation from that edition. All of this may indicate that records before the 16th century were based on different, non-existent manuscripts.

In German notations of Slavic names, b is often replaced by p and ⟨o⟩ written with u, cf. German Pürschutz, Burtschütz ← Old Sorbian *Borušici, German Portitz, Borticz ← Old Polabian *Borêtici. Additionally, Slavic bor "(conifer) forest" in German records is rendered as -bure-, -buru-, -buri-, cf. Zutibure, Mesaburii, Medeburu from the 10th/11th century, as well as Priburiwitz "Priborevic" (1215), Pritbur "Predbor" (1284).

In the Polabian theonymy, Pan-Slavic names of gods, e.g. because of taboo, were replaced by alternative names, common words, or given names, cf. god Yarovit and Serbian јаро̀вит, yarovit. The notation Borveit/Barovit can be read as Borovit, which would be indicated by words such as Czech borovitý, Serbo-Croatian боро̀вит/boròvit, Slovene borovit, as well as first and last names, e.g. Polish Borowity, Old Polabian *Borovit, Macedonian Боровит, Borovit. However, unlike other Polabian theonyms, Borovit would not consist of the suffix *-ovitъ, but of the adjective *borovъjь "of or pertaining to a conifer forest" and the suffix *-itъ. Borovy is also a synonym for Leshy – the spirit of the forest in East Slavic folklore.

==== Turupit ====
Knýtlinga saga, which uses the same source as Saxo, also mentions a deity named Turupit (in variants Turupit, Turtupit, Turtuput, Turupið). This is generally thought to be a corruption of the Porenut (Perunits) form: the Old Icelandic notation Ruivit would correspond to the notation Rugiaevitus of Saxo, Old Icelandic Puruvit would correspond to the notation Porevit of Saxo, and Turupit would correspond to the notation Porenutius of Saxo. Attempts have also been made to read this theonym literally, e.g. as T(o)ropiec from *trepati "to flutter", or to regard it as a loan from Celtic Taranis "Celtic god of the storm" (allegedly to the Proto-Slavic *Taranъ "god of the storm").

However, according to Michał Łuczyński, Turupit could confirm the reading Borovit. Latin d and b, and b and t were sometimes interchanged, e.g., Liduit → Liubi "Liduit", Syeba → Sieta "Živa"; a copyist, therefore, as a result of a mistake, could render the Slavic ⟨b⟩ as d (t). The suffix *-vit in Icelandic was also written as -pit.

== Bibliography ==
- Álvarez-Pedrosa, Juan Antonio (2021). Sources of Slavic Pre-Christian Religion. Leiden: Koninklijke Brill. ISBN 978-90-04-44138-5.
- Banaszkiewicz, Jacek (1996). "Pan Rugii - Rugiewit i jego towarzysze z Gardźca: Porewit i Porenut (Saxo Gramatyk, Gesta Danorum XIV, 39,38-41)". In Kurnatowska, Zofia (ed.). Słowiańszczyzna w Europie średniowiecznej. Vol. 1. Wrocław: WERK. pp. 75–82. ISBN 83-901964-7-6.
- Boryś, Wiesław (2005). "pora". Słownik etymologiczny languagea polskiego. Kraków: Wydawnictwo Literackie. ISBN 978-83-08-04191-8.
- Gieysztor, Aleksander (2006). Mitologia Słowian. Warsaw: Wydawnictwa Uniwersytetu Warszawskiego. ISBN 978-83-235-0234-0.
- Jakobson, Roman (1985). Selected Writings. Vol. VII Contributions to comparative mythology. Studies in linguistics and philology, 1972–1982. Stephen Rudy (red.) (2 ed.). Mouton. ISBN 9780899250519.
- Łowmiański, Henryk (1979). Religia Słowian i jej upadek, w. VI-XII (in Polish). Warsaw: Państwowe Wydawnictwo Naukowe. ISBN 83-01-00033-3.
- Łuczyński, Michał (2020). Bogowie dawnych Słowian. Studium onomastyczne (in Polish). Kielce: Kieleckie Towarzystwo Naukowe. ISBN 978-83-60777-83-1.
- Szyjewski, Andrzej (2003). Religia Słowian. Kraków: Wydawnictwo WAM. ISBN 83-7318-205-5.
- Urbańczyk, Stanisław (1991). Dawni Słowianie. Wiara i kult (in Polish). Wrocław: Ossolineum.
