= Yarovit =

Slavic war deity

- God of war
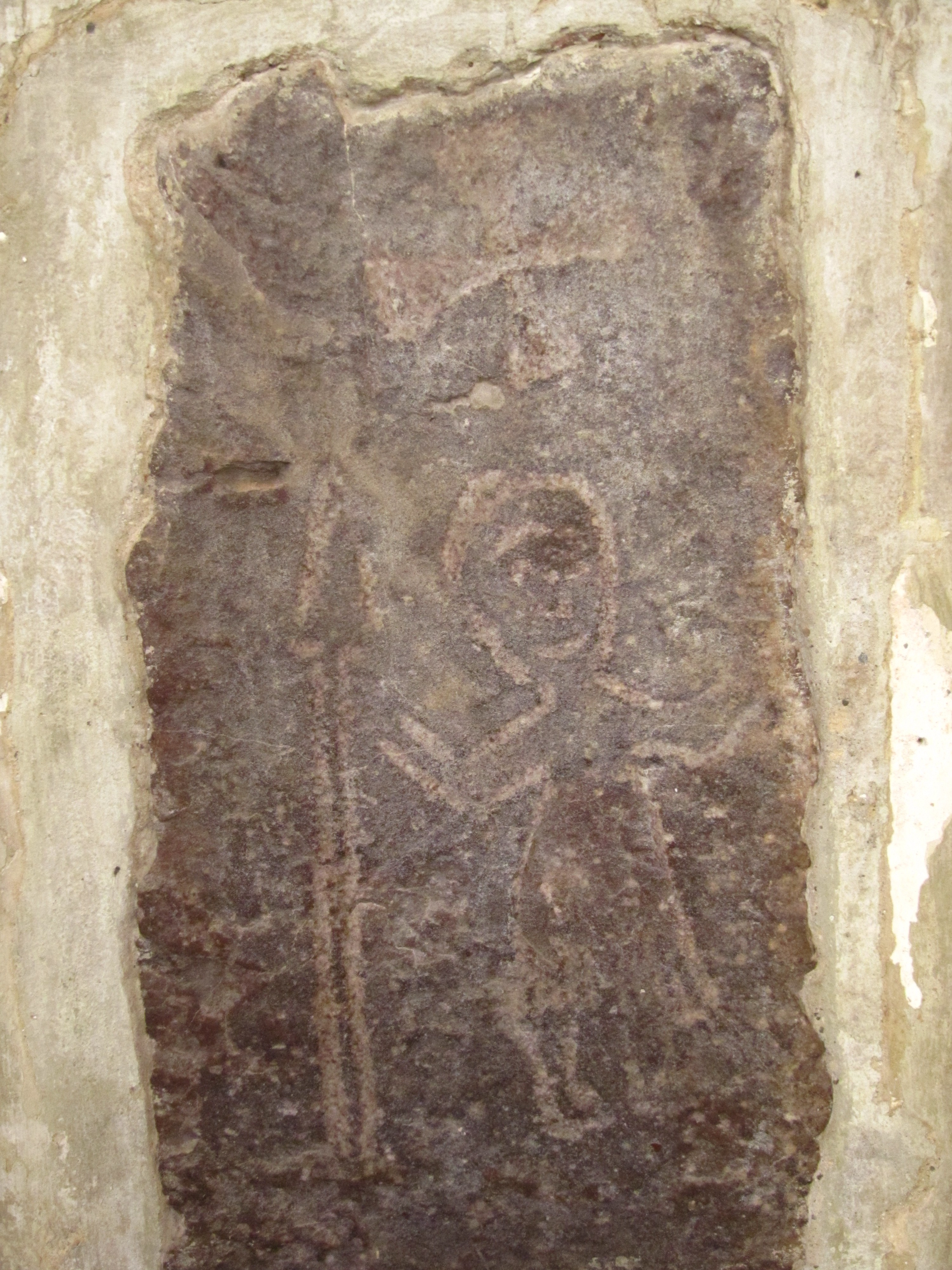
- A stone carving with a supposed image of Yarovit in the church of St. Peter in Wolgast
- Venerated in: Polabian religion
- Major cult center: Vologošč (Wolgast)
- Weapon: golden shield
- Region: Polabia

Equivalents
- Roman: Mars

Yarovit, Iarovit (or Yerovit, Ierovit) is a Polabian god of war, worshipped in Vologošč (Circipanians) and Hobolin (Hobolians; modern Havelberg). Sources give only a brief description of his cult, his main temple was located in Vologošč, where there was a golden shield belonging to Yarovit. By one Christian monk he was identified with the Roman Mars.

== Etymology ==
In Latin records, this theonym is noted as Gerovit and Herovith. These notations should be read as Yarovit, since in Latin German texts the Slavic element jar- is sometimes written as ⟨ger-⟩ or ⟨her-⟩ (cf. Latin: Geressiwe = Slavic Jarišov, Latin: Gerus = Slavic Jeruš, Latin: Gergnew = Slavic Jarogněv etc.). The notation by ⟨h⟩ is the result of changing the grapheme ⟨g⟩ → ⟨gh⟩ → ⟨h⟩ due to matching Polish pronunciation with German writing. The Old Polabian form is reconstructed as *Jerovit.

Scholars connect the root jar- with the Proto-Slavic adjective *jarъ(jь) "vigorous, strong" (cf. dated Polish: jary "vigorous", Lower Sorbian: jěry "impulsive; uncouth; ruthless", Old Church Slavonic: jarŭ "harsh") or with *jarъ "vernal" (cf. Old Czech: jarý, Old East Slavic: jaryi "vernal"). In favor of deriving the stem from the Proto-Slavic *jarъ(jь) is supported by the fact that in Proto-Slavic there was a word homophonous to the theonym: *jarovitъ(jь) (cf. dialectal Russian: yarovity, Serbian: jarovit, Bulgarian: yarovit).

In the second part there is supposed to be a suffix -vit (hypothetical PS *-vitъ) meaning "lord, ruler, hero". The suffix is supposed to derive from *vitędzь "warrior, hero" of Germanic etymology. Some researchers, however, have rejected the connection of the suffix with *vitędzь precisely because of the Germanic origin of the word; some scholars have linked the suffix to the word *vitati "to invite, to wish health", or the not independently attested verb *viti. (Note: Aleksandar Loma links this suffix with Old Church Slavonic vŭz-vitǐ, izvitije "prey, plunder", povinǫti "subdue", Bulgarian naviyam "I won", all of which contain the independently unattested verb *viti, which has a Lithuanian cognate of výti "to chase the enemy" and comes from the same stem as *vojь "soldier".) Depending on which meaning of the root jary- a given researcher takes, the theonym is translated, for example, as "Young master" or "Strong, Mighty Lord".

Some researchers also divide the theonym as Yar-ovit, where the suffix -ovit means "one who has a lot of (something)", "characterized by (something)", and the theonym Yarovit is supposed to mean "One in whom there is a lot of what is strong, powerful".

== Sources ==
The god Yarovit appears in the hagiographies of Otto of Bamberg, who led Christianization missions among the Polabian Slavs and Pomeranians: in 1151 Life of Saint Otto, Bishop of Bamberg by the monk Ebo, and in Dialog on the Life of Saint Otto of Bamberg written in 1158–1159 by monk Herbord. (Note: Researchers do not completely agree on the dating of the sources – some believe that Herbord's source is older than Ebon's.)

Ebo reports that in April 1127, St. Otto returned to Pomerania to continue his Christianization missions. He first reaches Magdeburg, and the next day goes to Hobolin (now Havelberg). In this town, almost no one wore Christian names anymore, and when Otto arrived, the town was decorated with flags in honor of the god Yarovit. Then, in May, Otto sends his companions, Ulrich and Albin, to Vologošč, where the well-known temple of Yarovit was located, and began Christianization. A pagan priest who heard about this was to leave the town in temple clothing and, pretending to be Yarovit himself, order a resident he met in the forest to tell the city residents that they should kill the Christians, otherwise they would all die. In the evening, on the same day:

[...] some of the venerable bishop’s followerswished to examine the temple in that same city and proceeded to do so without further precaution; whereupon some of the citizens suspected that they wished to set their temple ablaze and, assembled together, they went out to meet them with the discordant clatter of arms. Then the pious Ulrich turned to his companions and said: “It is not without reason that they have assembled; be assured that they have been hastened by our entry.” Hearing this, the companions turned back on their path and sought refuge for their flight. But a clergyman named Dietrich, who had gone ahead of them and had approached the doors of the temple, not knowing where to turn, boldly burst into the shrine itself, and, seeing a golden shield hanging on the wall which had been dedicated to Yarovit, their god of war, and which they considered it unlawful to touch, seized the shield and faced them. They, as ignorantly simple men, thought that their god Yarovit was advancing to meet them and, stupefied, they retreated and fell to the ground. Dietrich, perceiving their folly, threw away the shield and fled, thanking God that He had thought fit to deliver His servants out of their hands.

– Ebo, Life of Saint Otto, Bishop of Bamberg

Herbord gives similar information about an attempt to kill Christians – a Christian priest who hid in a pagan temple took a large shield covered with gold plates, which no man could touch, which was taken out only in times of war. This shield was dedicated "to their god Yarovit, who in Latin is called Mars." In Herbord's version, the god's threat uttered through the priest's mouth was supposed to read as follows:

I am your god; I am the one who covers the meadows with grass and the forests with leaves, raises crops in fields and trees, (gives) fertility to cattle. Everything that people use come from my power.

– Herbord, Dialog on the Life of Saint Otto of Bamberg

== Interpretations ==
The sowing festival dedicated to Yarovit, witnessed by Otto, probably took place on April 15. It is believed that the theonym Jarowit is relatively new and has replaced earlier ones on a taboo basis. According to Henryk Łowmiański, the story about the priest disguising himself as Yarovit and threatening the citizens was invented by Christians to ridicule the priest.

Scholars interpret Yarovit differently. According to Aleksander Gieysztor, Yarovit is the obvious god of war, and he compares his golden shield guarded in the temple to the shield guarded in the Roman Regia. This god was said to be a Polabian hypostasis of Perun. According to Andrzej Szyjewski, this god manifests solar, martial qualities, and was also responsible for the sphere of fertility, harvest and youth.

Some researchers also link the figure of Yarovit with an East Slavic character named Yarilo, who is considered by some researchers to be an East Slavic deity. Information about Yarilo does not appear until 1765, and it is described there as a folk custom abolished by the bishop. According to ethnographic material, one of the girls was dressed in Jarilo's clothing; Jarilo was to be a young man in a white robe, barefoot, with a human head in his right hand, ears of rye in his left, wearing a wreath of herbs and was to sit on a white horse. The identity or connection between Yarovit and Yarilo is supported primarily by the fact that both names contain the same stem jar- and that the holidays associated with one and the other took place on April 15 (or on a similar date). The view of the relationship between Yarovit and Yarilo is supported, for example, by Gieysztor, Michal Téra, Roman Zaroff. However, many researchers consider the relationship between the two figures to be controversial or unsubstantiated, such Łowmiański, Stanisław Urbańczyk or Jerzy Strzelczyk, just as it is considered controversial to interpret Yarilo as a deity.

Some scholars also consider Yarovit and Svetovit to be identical or synonymous deities. The first to propose such a view was Aleksander Brückner, who recognized that the words *jarъ(jь) and *svętъ were formerly synonymous and that both meant "strong", while *svętъ began to mean "holy, sacred" only under the influence of Christianity. Therefore, the theonyms Yarovit and Svetovit mean the same thing, as do the given names Yaropelk and Svetopelk, with the theonym Yarovit supposed to have originated first, later replaced by Svetovit by Rugians. The view of a close relationship between the two deities has been supported by, for example Urbańczyk, Łowmiański or Zaroff. However, the view that *jarъ(jь) and *svętъ were synonyms is criticized and often unsupported by modern scholars.

== In archeology ==
There are two stone slabs in St. Peter's Church in Wolgast. The first, measuring 86 × 46 cm, was found in 1920 under the floor, and was later built into the wall of the church. On this slab was carved a man in a long robe, with his hands raised, holding a spear in his right hand. Later, a Maltese cross was carved above his head. The figure is perhaps standing on a hill. The stone is called the Yarovit's stone (German: Gerovitstein).

The second slab measures 193 × 117 cm. It depicts a man wearing a long robe decorated below the waist with an ornament; in his right hand he holds a spear, whose spearhead has been destroyed by a Maltese cross. The left hand arches over the hip, which corresponds to miniature figures from the Slavic period.

== See also ==
- Yarri
- Ares
- Erra

== Bibliography ==
- Alvarez-Pedroza, Juan Antonio (2021). Sources of Slavic Pre-Christian Religion. Leiden: Koninklijke Brill. ISBN 978-90-04-44138-5.
- Boryś, Wiesław (2005). Słownik etymologiczny języka polskiego. Kraków: Wydawnictwo Literackie. ISBN 978-83-08-04191-8.
- Brückner, Aleksander (1985). Urbańczyk, Stanisław (ed.). Mitologia słowiańska (in Polish). Warsaw: Państwowe Wydawnictwo Naukowe. ISBN 8301062452.
- Gieysztor, Aleksander (2006). Mitologia Słowian. Warsaw: Wydawnictwa Uniwersytetu Warszawskiego. ISBN 978-83-235-0234-0.
- Loma, Aleksandar (2002). Prakosovo. Slovenski i indoevropski koreni srpske epike (in Serbian). Belgrade.
- Łowmiański, Henryk (1979). Religia Słowian i jej upadek, w. VI-XII. Warsaw: Państwowe Wydawnictwo Naukowe. ISBN 83-01-00033-3.
- Łuczyński, Michał (2020). Bogowie dawnych Słowian. Studium onomastyczne. Kielce: Kieleckie Towarzystwo Naukowe. ISBN 978-83-60777-83-1.
- Rosik, Stanisław (2020). The Slavic Religion in the Light of 11th- and 12th-Century German Chronicles (Thietmar of Merseburg, Adam of Bremen, Helmold of Bosau): Studies on the Christian Interpretation of pre-Christian Cults and Beliefs in the Middle Ages. Leiden: Brill. ISBN 9789004331488.
- Strzelczyk, Jerzy (1998). Mity, podania i wierzenia dawnych Słowian (in Polish). Poznań: Dom Wydawniczy Rebis. ISBN 83-7120-688-7.
- Szczepanik, Paweł (2020). Rzeczywistość mityczna Słowian północno-zachodnich i jej materialne wyobrażenia. Toruń: Wydawnictwo Naukowe Uniwersytetu Mikołaja Kopernika. ISBN 978-83-231-4349-9.
- Szyjewski, Andrzej (2003). Religia Słowian. Kraków: Wydawnictwo WAM. ISBN 83-7318-205-5.
- Téra, Michal (2009). Perun: Bůh hromovládce (in Czech). Červený Kostelec: Pavel Mervart. ISBN 978-80-86818-82-5.
- Urbańczyk, Stanisław (1991). Dawni Słowianie. Wiara i kult. Wrocław: Ossolineum.
- Zaroff, Roman (2002). "The Origins of Sventovit of Rügen". Studia Mythologica Slavica. 5: 9–18. doi:10.3986/sms.v5i0.1794. ISSN 1581-128X.
- Zaroff, Roman (2019). "Rugian Slavic God Sventovit – One More Time". Studia mythologica Slavica. 22: 37–54. doi:10.3986/SMS20192202. ISSN 1581-128X. S2CID 203280509.
