= Kresnik (deity) =

Slavic god

- God of sun, summer solstice, fire, sky, thunderbolt, fertility
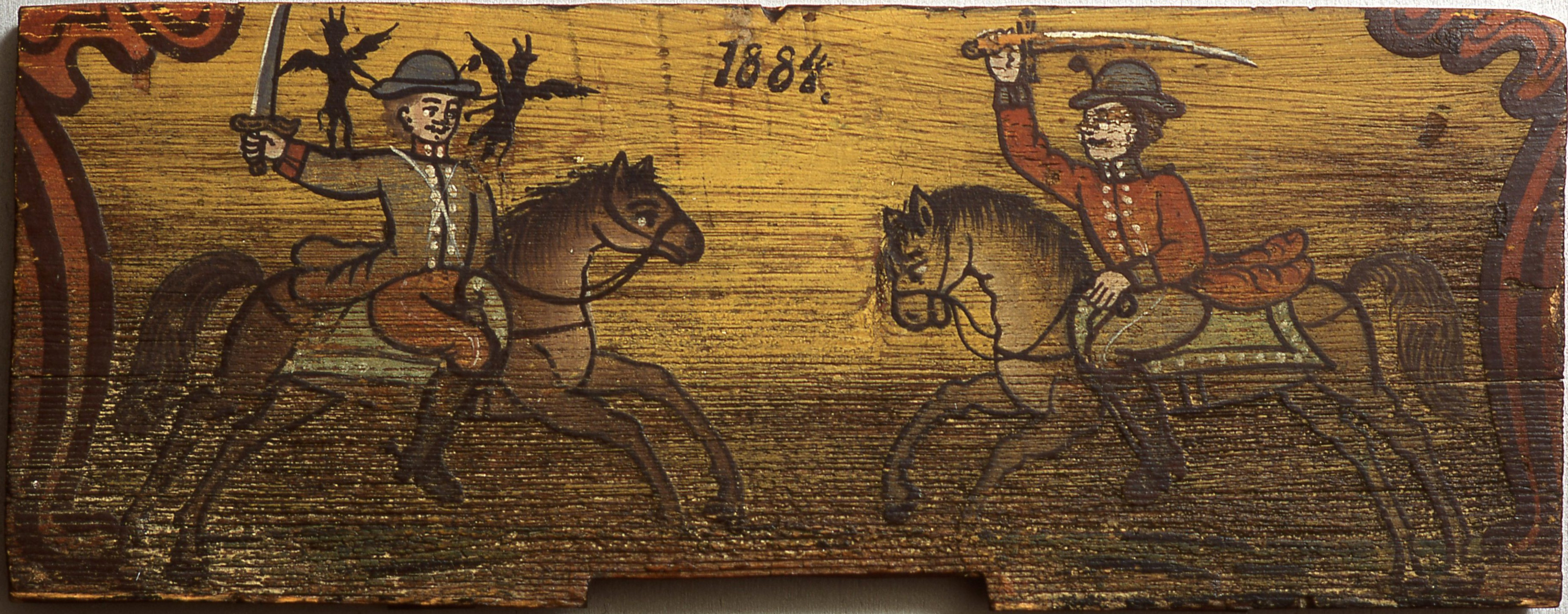
- Combat between historical heroes Lambergar and Pegam (Bohemian) Jan Vitovec contains the mythological duel between stormgod Kresnik (Perun?) and a three-headed demon/ or demon with two devils (Veles?)
- Abode: World's Mountain
- Symbol: bonfire, east
- Parents: Higher sky god
- Consort: Alenčica / Marjetica / Vesina

Equivalents
- Christian: John the Baptist
- Roman: Iupiter Depulsor ("Jupiter, Averter of Evil") of Noricum (?)
- Slavic: Perun, Yarilo, Dazhbog

Kresnik (or rarely Kersnik and Krsnik) is a Slavic god associated with fire, the summer solstice, and storms. His mythical home, a sacred mountain at the top of the world, represents the axis mundi.

Kresnik was worshiped among the Slavic population of the eastern Alps. He is probably the same deity as Svarožič, son of the Slavic sun god, Svarog, described as having golden hair and golden hands. He gradually evolved into a Slovenian national hero who lives on a golden mountain, sometimes as a deer with golden antlers, associated with the summer solstice. He became known as a mythical king with strong magic, yet still a farmer.

== Etymology ==
The name of Kresnik has no clear etymology. Connections with Russian Khors or Xors and Indian Krishna have been proposed in the past, although Krishna is the cognate of the Slavic word for black. The name could be connected with old Nordic hress with the meaning »fresh, fiery, alive, vivid« (by Jeza, F.), but also with IE *ker-/kre- with the meaning »to grow, to feed« (by Gluhak, A.), perhaps with the Iranian root *krs-/kars-, and also with Slavic *krst- »cross« (by Bošković-Stulli and Merku). As Mikhailov has shown, the name of Kresnik could be derived from Balto-Slavic linguistic heritage: festival of Kresze is known among Balts and an old Slavic word *krěsδ has the meaning of »fire«. For Mikhailov there are three possible connections with the root *krês: Sun, Solstice or blow.

Kres is the Slovenian word for bonfire.

== Life and spiritual functions ==
Kresnik is the son of the great creator deity, ruler of heaven, who has been identified in various sources as Svarog or Perun. He lives in a fantastical country, sometimes called the "Land of the Rising Sun", "Eastern Land", or the "Ninth Country", and rules on the "world mountain", which is frequently described as being golden, crystal, or glass.

Kresnik is described as having golden hair and golden hands or arms. He was born either with horse earlaps, horse hooves, or a birthmark shaped like hooves, and he frequently is said to be able to take the form of a horse.

Connected to sun and fire, he travels the sky on his golden chariot, armed with thunderbolt, axe, hammer, club, or sword. Like Hercules, Kresnik performed twelve great deeds. Sometimes he is helped by his brother Trot or his four-eyed dog. His chthonic opponent steals his property, cattle, or wife-sister, but Kresnik defeats him. Rain or wheat falls from the sky after such combat.

In most tales, his wife is his sister, a goddess of spring named Alenčica, Marjetica, Vesina, or any number of variations. In some versions, Kresnik also has a lover who is the daughter of a chthonic snake deity, his perpetual enemy, and Kresnik is eventually killed due to either his wife or lover's jealousy.

== Comparative mythology ==
Comparative mythology has posited that this demigod perhaps originated from the Iranian god Yima and his double, the Indian Yama, with whom they share many common characteristics. On the other hand, Kresnik is also a storm god and so shares many common features with the Slavic god Perun. Some characteristics even connect him with the Slavic hero Yarilo/Jarovit., and there are many correlations with the Iranian deity Mithra and the Hindu Indra as well.

== Historical development ==
Kresnik gradually evolved into a Slovenian national hero who lives on a golden mountain, sometimes as a deer with golden antlers. As a human, he is a great king skilled with magic, but who interests himself in farming. In some tales he even fights off the "dog-headed" Mongols as a peasant youth.

Kresnik appeared in legend as a heroic prince of Vurberk, although its 19th-century account, by Davorin Trstenjak, may have been embellished in language and style. In that legend, the prince fights a dragon attacking Vurberk castle to save the princess, his sister, and marries her. This incestuous plot element is likely a remnant from Kresnik's mythological cycle, where as the god of summer, he married his sister, the goddess of spring. In an alternative version, the prince fights a white snake attacking Vurberk castle, and marries a squire's daughter, who is not his sister. In either case, Vurberk castle's coat of arms, which has displayed a dragon or snake since at least 1204 A.D., supports the idea that the legend predates its 19th-century appearance in anthropological research.

With the rise of Christianity, Kresnik was replaced with John the Baptist. A pre-Christian water holiday was probably preserved by association with John the Baptist. Kresnik's association with midsummer, fire, and rain are tied to St. John's Eve, when in parts of Slovenia, fires are lit and water poured over the people around them. The washing of sin parallels Kresnik, who creates rain by vanquishing the serpent of evil. On St. John's Day, many customs retain memories of the Kresnik mythology, like the lighting of fires, rolling of sun-shaped wooden wheels, and young girls called "Kresnice" singing harvest songs. The Slovenian translation for "Baptist" is »Krstnik«, a similar word.

== Controversies ==
Kresnik as a deity and Kresnik/Krsnik as magical vampire hunter seem to represent two quite different mythological traditions. A hypothesis was proposed by Damjan J. Ovsec based on research by E. Gasparini that Kresnik was a pagan lunar entity, and only in the later development were some solar attributes added. The lunar hypothesis is still rejected by a majority of researchers, as some Slovenian customs connected with Midsummer Eve, like lighting and jumping over bonfires, and rolling fiery wheels, are undoubtedly connected with the worship of the Sun.

Kresnik is most commonly understood to be the Slovenian name for the common Slavic god Perun. Monika Kropej claims that Kresnik is at the same time Perun's son and also a seasonal aspect of Perun. Perun is incarnated during the winter as Božič, in the spring as Yarilo, in the summer as Kresnik and in the autumn as Zlatorog, a deer with golden antlers. However, Kresnik's brother Trot is also connected to Perun, so no clear answer can be given in this connection.

== See also ==
- Krsnik (vampire hunter)

== Sources ==
- (in English)Copeland, F. S. (1931): Slovene Folklore. In: Folklore Vol. 42, Issue 4: pg 405–446.
- (in English)Copeland, F. S. (1949): Some Aspects of Slovene Folklore. In: Folklore Vol. 6, Issue 2: pg 277–286.
- (in Slovene)Kropej, Monika(2005): Bajeslovje: Verski in predstavni svet ljudi, ki temelji na mitih. In: Bogataj, Janez et al. (2005): Narodna kulturna dediščina. Ljubljana, Zavod za varstvo kulturne dediščine.
- Kropej, Monika (2003). “Cosmology and Deities in Slovene Folk Narrative and Song Tradition" [Kozmologija in boštva V Slovenskem Ljudskem Pripovednem in pesniškem izročilu]". In: Studia Mythologica Slavica 6 (May). Ljubljana, Slovenija, 126-130. https://doi.org/10.3986/sms.v6i0.1780.
- (in English)Kropej, Monika(1998): The Horse as the Cosmological Creature in the Slovene Mythopoetic Heritage. In: Studia Mythologica Slavica I, 1998, Pages 153–167. Ljubljana, Založba ZRC.
- (in Slovene)Mikhailov Nikolai (2002): Mythologica slovenica: Poskus rekonstrukcije slovenskega poganskega izročila. Trst, Mladika.
- (in Slovene)Ovsec, Damjan J. (1991): Slovanska mitologija in verovanje. Ljubljana, Domus
- (in Slovene)Šmitek, Zmago (2004): Mitološko izročilo Slovencev: Svetinje preteklosti. Ljubljana, Študentska založba.
- (in English)Šmitek, Zmago (1998): Kresnik: An Attempt at Mythological Reconstruction. In: Studia Mythologica Slavica, Vol 1, 93-118.
