= Tetzlav =

Prince of Rügen

Tetzlav, also known as Tezlaw, Tetzlaw and Tetislaw (before 1163 – between 1170 and 1181) was a Prince of Rügen.

== Life ==
According to the Pomeranian chronicler, Thomas Kantzow, he was a son of the Rani king, Ratislaus of Rügen (1105−1140). Even before the first recorded mention of Tetzlav in 1164 as King of the island territory of Rügen by the writer, Saxo Grammaticus, the Rani tribe were the object of several campaigns by the Danish king, Valdemar I and the Saxon duke, Henry the Lion. Tetzlav and his co-regent brother, Jaromar, had to acknowledge the suzerainty of their conquerors each time. For example, they took part in 1162 in Valdemar's military campaign against Wolgast and in 1163 in the consecration of Lübeck Cathedral by Henry the Lion.

After the Danes under Valdemar I and Bishop Absalon of Roskilde conquered the Jaromarsburg in 1168, Tetzlav and Jaromar surrendered their main residence and temple site at Charenza, following negotiations, without a fight. By recognizing the suzerainty of the Danish king and converting to Christianity, they secured their lordship over Rügen. This was manifested in particular through the disempowerment of the Sventovit priests who hitherto had enjoyed the status of secular rulers. Tetzlav was henceforth called the Prince of Rügen. As vassals of the Danes, the Rani soon took part in military expeditions again against the Pomeranians, including the siege of Stettin by Valdemar I in 1170.

In 1170 Tetzlav is mentioned for the last time in the written records. In 1181 his brother, Jaromar I, became the sole Prince of Rügen. The street Tetzlawstraße in Stralsund is named after him.

Preceded by Ratislaus of Rügen	Prince of Rügen; 1162 – 1170/1181	Succeeded by Jaromar I
