= Stanisław Urbańczyk =

Polish linguist (1909–2001)

- Born: July 27, 1909; Kwaczała
- Died: October 23, 2001 (aged 92); Kraków

Academic background
- Education: Jagiellonian University

Stanisław Urbańczyk (27 July 1909 – 23 October 2001) was a Polish linguist and academic, a professor at the universities of Toruń, Poznań and Kraków. He was the head of the Institute of the Polish Language at the Polish Academy of Sciences in 1973–79.

Born to a peasant family in Kwaczała, he completed 4-class elementary school in Kwaczała and started learning in St. Anne's Secondary School (today I Liceum Ogólnokształcące im. Bartłomieja Nowodworskiego w Krakowie). In the years 1929–1934 he studied Polish and Slavic philology at the Jagiellonian University. In 1937 he became an academic teacher. Among his students was young Karol Wojtyła, later the pope John Paul II. In 1939 he was arrested by the Nazis during Sonderaktion Krakau and imprisoned in concentration camps in Sachsenhausen and Dachau.

He was the author of many books, articles and reviews. Among his scholarly interests were synchronical and diachronical Polish grammar, dialectology, history of language, Slavic native religion and mythology, biblical translation and influence of Czech onto Polish in Middle Ages.

== Work ==
(A selection)

- Religia pogańskich Słowian (Religion of Pagan Slavs, 1947)
- Głos w dyskusji o pochodzeniu polskiego języka literackiego, 1953.
- Zarys dialektologii polskiej (An Outline of Polish Dialectology, 1962)
- Encyklopedia wiedzy o języku polskim (The Encyclopaedia of Knowledge about Polish Language, 1978, as the editor in chief)
- Dawni Słowianie: wiara i kult (Old Slavs – Faith and Cult, 1991)
- Z miłości do wiedzy: wspomnienia (Out of Love to Knowledge – Memoirs, 1997)

== Bibliography ==
- Ewa Deptuchowa, Publikacje Profesora Stanisława Urbańczyka w zakresie językoznawstwa polonistycznego (Professor Stanisław Urbańczyk's Works in the Field of Polish Linguistics), [in:] Język polski – wczoraj, dziś, jutro, Edited by Barbara Czopek-Kopciuch and Piotr Żmigrodzki, Wydawnictwo LEXIS, Kraków 2010, p. 15–23.
