= Yarilo =

Slavic god of fertility and spring

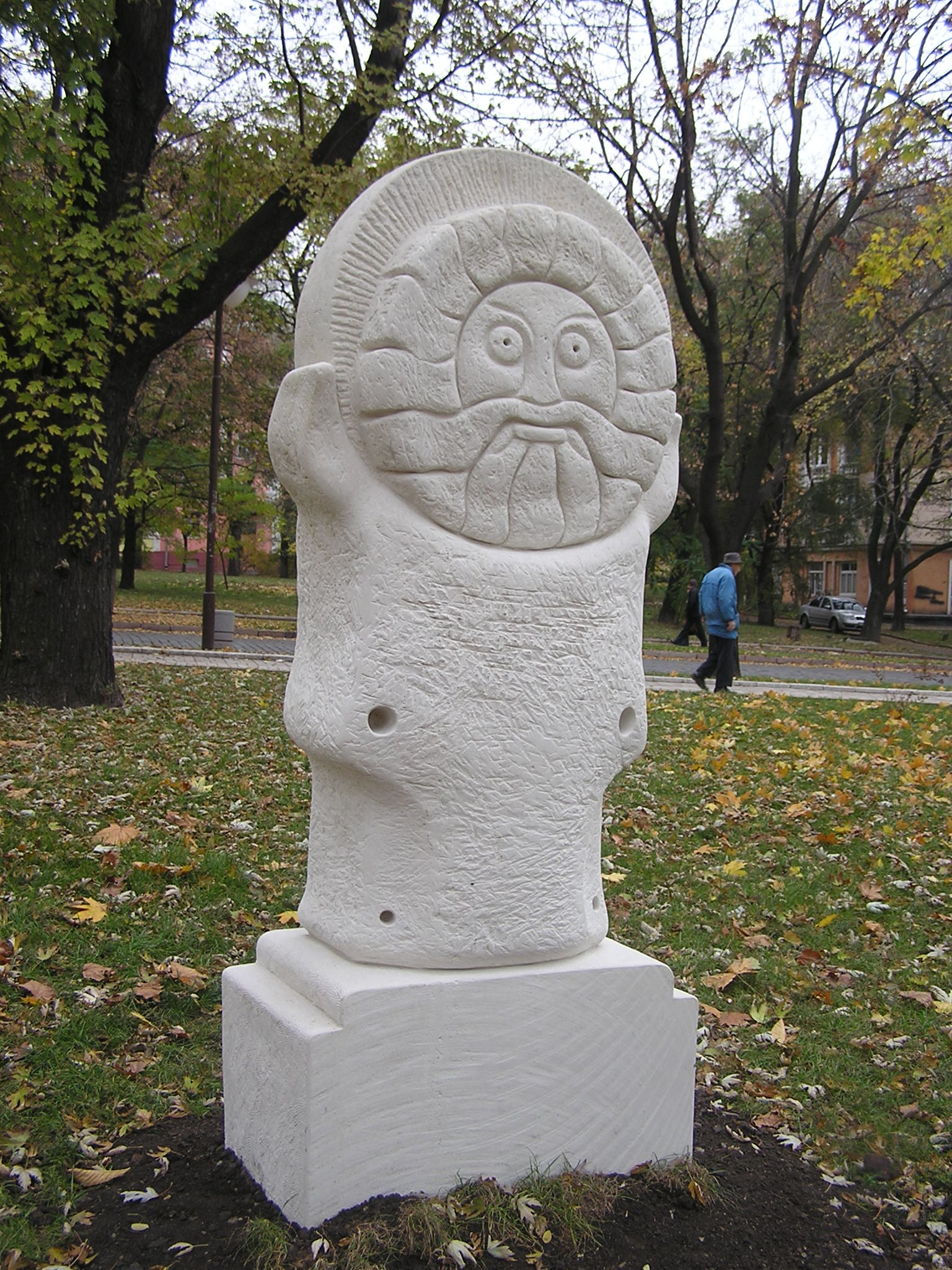
Modern statue of Jarilo in the Ukrainian Steppe park, Donetsk

Jarylo (Cyrillic: Ярило, Ярила; Serbo-Croatian: Jarilo, Јарило; Belarusian: Ярыла), alternatively Yaryla, Yarilo, Iarilo, Juraj, Jurij, or Gerovit, is an alleged East and South Slavic god of vegetation, fertility and springtime.

== Etymology ==
The Proto-Slavic root *jarъ (jar, yar), from Proto-Indo-European *yōr-, *yeh₁ro-, from *yeh₁r-, means "spring" or "summer", "strong", "furious", "imbued with youthful life-force". This youthful life-force was considered sacred in the Slavic pre-Christian religion and the god personifying this sacred force was thus called Jarovit, or hypocoristically Jarilo.

== Sources ==
The only historic source that mentions this deity is a 12th-century biography of the proselytizing German bishop Otto of Bamberg, who, during his expeditions to convert the pagan tribes of Wendish and Polabian Slavs, encountered festivals in honor of the war-god Gerovit in the cities of Wolgast and Havelberg. Gerovit is most likely a German derivation of the Slavic name Jarovit.

Up until the 19th century in Ukraine, Russia, Belarus and Serbia, folk festivals called Jarilo were celebrated in late spring or early summer. Early researchers of Slavic mythology recognised in them relics of pagan ceremonies in honor of an eponymous spring deity. In northern Croatia and southern Slovenia, especially White Carniola, similar spring festivals were called Jurjevo or Zeleni Juraj or Zeleni Jurij (Green George), nominally dedicated to St. George, and fairly similar to the Jarilo festivals of other Slavic nations.

== See also ==
- 2273 Yarilo
- Yarovit

== Bibliography ==
- V. Belaj. "Hod kroz godinu: mitska pozadina hrvatskih narodnih običaja i vjerovanja" [Walk through year, mythical background of Croatian folk beliefs and customs], Golden Marketing, Zagreb 1998.
