= Siege of Arkona =

Danish siege against Slavic tribe

The siege of Arkona
- Part of the Danish Crusades
| Date | 1168 or 1169 |
| Location | Rügen, Germany |
| Result | Danish victory |
| Territorial changes | Rügen Annexed by Denmark |

Belligerents
| Denmark | Rani |

Commanders and leaders
| Valdemar I Absalon | Unknown |

Strength
| ~2,000–5,000 | ~1,000 |

Casualties and losses
| Minor | Nearly the entire force killed or captured Fortress captured and plundered Statue of Svandavitz destroyed and burned Temple looted and razed |

The siege of Arkona was a short eight-day siege between the Danish and Pommeranian forces under Valdemar I and the Wendish forces of the temple-fortress of Arkona. It resulted in a decisive victory for the Danish forces, after which the rest of Rügen surrendered.

== Background ==
During the Danish civil war, the King Sweyn III was said to have allied with the pagan Wends against his rivals for the throne, whereupon the Wends were sent to harry the lands of those who did not recognize his claim. Sweyn was ultimately defeated by King Valdemar, leaving a king who was hostile to the Wends on the Danish throne. After reunifying Denmark, Valdemar I began reorganizing his military in a style akin to that of the Vikings, focusing heavily on amphibious assault and raiding. These raids culminated in the late 1160s when King Valdemar and Bishop Absalon set out to conquer Rügen.

== The siege ==
In Gesta Danorum, the chronicler Saxo Grammaticus writes that the siege only lasted for 8 days. The siege was reportedly so short because a fire broke out beneath one of the fortress's towers, forcing the Wendish defenders to divert a significant portion of their manpower in order to put out the fire. Seeing this, the bishop Absalon urged the King to attack the fortress, and so King Valdemar began a full assault. The Danish forces capitalized on the distracted Wends, who could not prevent the Danes from taking the gate and the fortress along with it. The Danes then plundered the settlement and destroyed the temple of Svetovit (or Svandavitz)—first chopping the great four-headed statue of Svetovit to pieces, and then burning it.

== Aftermath ==
With the fortress taken, the island submitted to Danish rule. The victorious Danes established the principality of Rügen, with Jaromar I becoming prince of the isle, and Valdemar its king. The island's population was christened and baptized, and the islanders were forced to build new Christian churches. The total success of this crusade revitalized the notion of crusades in the region, and seemed to confirm to the Christian world that the pagans of northeastern Europe could only be Christianized through subjugation.

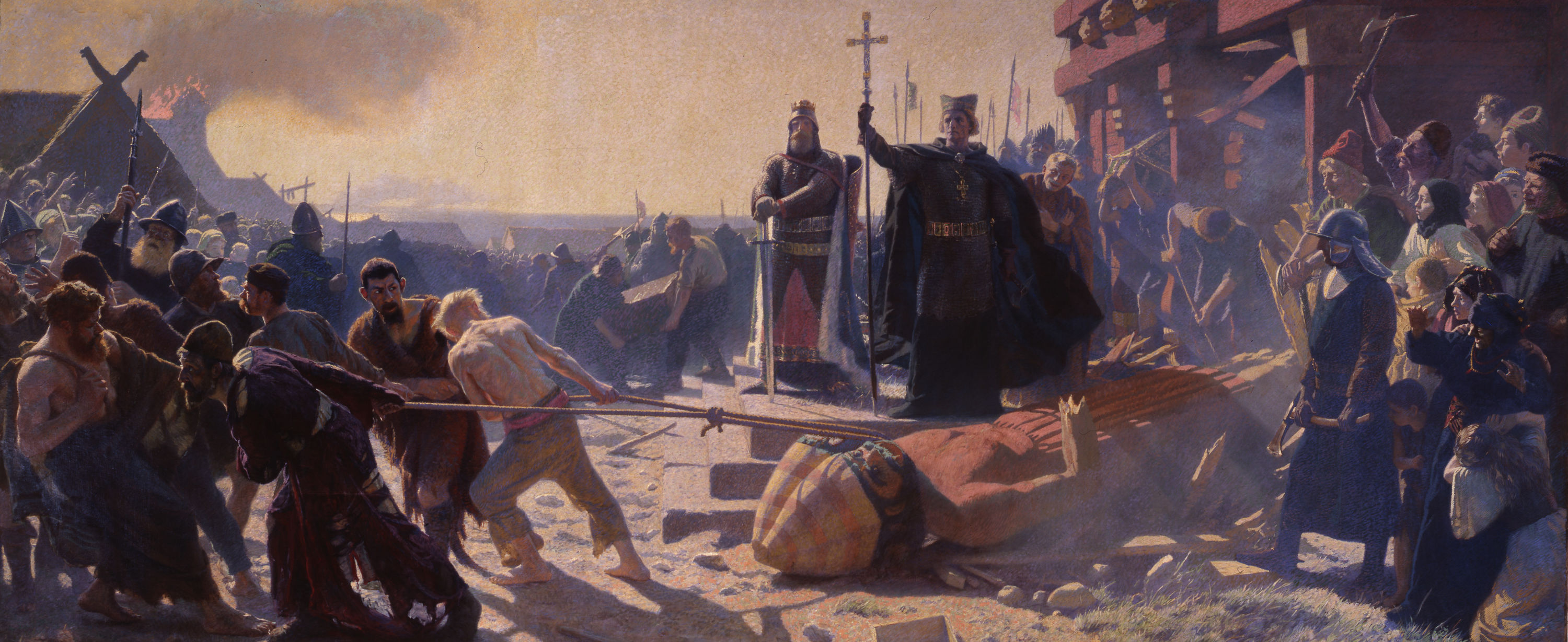
Lauritz Tuxen: The Taking of Arkona in 1169, King Valdemar and Bishop Absalon.

== Works cited ==
- Pratt, Fletcher (1950). The Third King. New York: Sloane. OCLC 947721635.
