= Porenut =

Slavic god

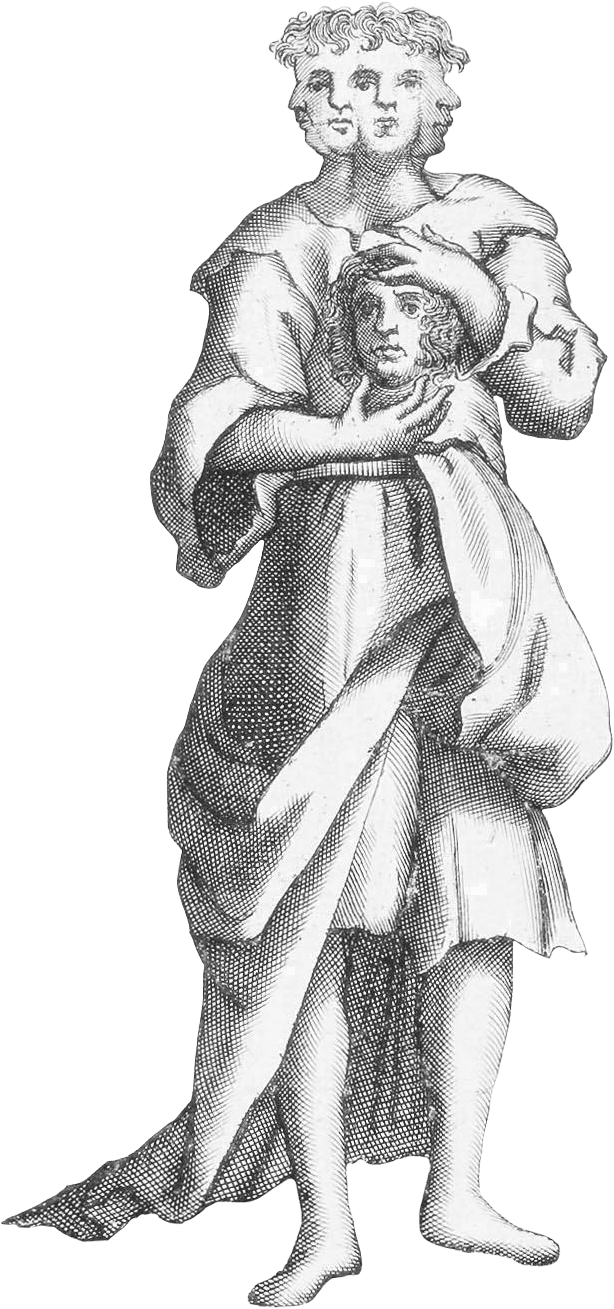
- Porenut in Britannia Antiqua Illustrata
- Major cult center: Charenza
- Region: Rugen

Genealogy
- Parents: Perun? (father)

Porenut (Latin: Porenutius, Poremicius) is a god with unknown functions mentioned in only two sources: Gesta Danorum and in Knýtlinga saga. The only historical information about this god is the description of a statue depicting him with four faces on his head and a fifth face on his chest, which was held by his chin with his right hand and his forehead with his left hand.

== Sources ==
The first source to mention Porenut is the Gesta Danorum by Saxo Grammaticus. Saxo describes when, after Arkona was captured by the Danish king Valdemar I, its inhabitants made an agreement with him, which encourages the inhabitants of Charenza to make a similar agreement and surrender the city without a fight. Saxo describes that in this gord (stronghold) there were three temples dedicated to Rugiaevit, Porevit and Porenut. After the destruction of the temple and the ideol of Rugiaevit by the Danes, Saxo writes:

And not satisfied with its destruction, a group of auxiliary troops turned greedily to the statue of Porevit, which was worshiped in the temple next door. This idol had five heads, but had been sculpted without decorations on its sides. Having torn down this idol, they went to the temple of Porenutius. This statue, represented with four faces, had a fifth face embedded in the body, whose forehead it touched with its left hand, and the chin with its right. This statue fell under the blows of the axes wielded by the servants.

Latin original text
Nec eius excidio contentae satellitum manus ad Poreuitum simulacrum, quod in proxima aede colebatur, auidius porriguntur. Id quinque capitibus consitum, sed armis uacuum fingebatur. Quo succiso, Porenutii templum appetitur. Haec statua, quattuor facies repraesentans, quintam pectori insertam habebat, cuius frontem laeua, mentum dextera tangebat. Haec famulorum ministerio securibus icta concidit.

The same information is then given by the Knýtlinga saga, which lists Porenut in the distorted form Turupit (Old Icelandic: Turupið). (Note: Probably confused with the Finnish/Estonian god Tharapita. Attempts have also been made to translate the name as Toropiec-Tropiec, from the word trepati "to shake, to strike, to hurry".)

== Interpretations ==
There are two main ways to interpret the Latinized theonym Porenutius. One reading of the name is Porenits. (Note: Aleksander Gieysztor: Porenuc. He polonized it as Pioruniec, Piorunic.) In this case the name of this god would literally mean "son of Perun" and would have originated in the following way: Proto-Slavic *Perunъ "god of the storm" → Old Polabian *P'orěn (with Lekhitic apophony e → 'o) → *P'orěnitjь. The Proto-Slavic suffix *-itjь has a patronymic function, i.e., a name or surname supplemented with this suffix means that it originated from a father's name (cf. Svarog → Svarozhits), and in the Old Polabian it is continued as *-ūt, *-yt, *-ic, which most probably in Latin was written as -utius-, -ucius-.

The first part is also sometimes connected with the word pora in its original, Proto-Slavic (*pora) meaning "push, thrust", "force, effort, full strength", "period of effort, hard work". According to Jacek Banaszkiewicz, a Polish professor of medieval history, the three Charenza deities are not a "random" group of deities, but a group of deities that patronize areas fundamental to the existence of society. He considers Rugiaevit as the chief god, who patronizes war and the community, and Porevit and Porenut as divine twins, who complement the chief deity with their universal characteristics. Banaszkiewicz points out that a common feature of divine twins is the repetition of the first part of the name or the second part of the name; according to him, Porevit and Porenut share the first part (pora). He also points out that twins often have contradictory features; Porevit is considered a "positive" twin whose name should be understood as "Lord of strength, Lord who can cope with everything" (the suffix -vit "lord, ruler, master"), while Porenut is considered a "negative" twin and translates his name as "Lord in need of support", reading the suffix -nut as -nud and connecting it with the Old Polish nuda and the German Nut meaning "need, compulsion". Banaszkiewicz also points to the fact that they both have five faces, two less than Rugiaevit, with Porenut having only four faces on his head, and the fifth one he holds with his hands on his chest, which according to him may indicate that his character's importance is diminished in relation to Porevit. It may also be important that the right hand supports the fifth face, while the left hand holds it by the forehead. Andrzej Szyjewski is also in favor of combining the first part of both Porevit and Porenut with the word pora.

== Bibliography ==
- Łuczyński, Michał (2014). "Dwa starosłowiańskie teonimy: psł. *Svarožitjь, społab. *P'orěnitjь —epitety patronimiczne czy hipokorystyka?". Onomastica. 58. Kraków: Komitet Językoznawstwa PAN, Instytut Języka Polskiego PAN: 235–252. ISSN 0078-4648.
- Szyjewski, Andrzej (2003). Religia Słowian. Kraków: Wydawnictwo WAM. ISBN 83-7318-205-5.
- Boryś, Wiesław (2005). "pora". Słownik etymologiczny languagea polskiego. Kraków: Wydawnictwo Literackie. ISBN 978-83-08-04191-8.
- Gieysztor, Aleksander (2006). Mitologia Słowian. Warszawa: Wydawnictwa Uniwersytetu Warszawskiego. ISBN 978-83-235-0234-0.
- Banaszkiewicz, Jacek (1996). "Pan Rugii - Rugiewit i jego towarzysze z Gardźca: Porewit i Porenut (Saxo Gramatyk, Gesta Danorum XIV, 39,38-41)". In Kurnatowska, Zofia (ed.). Słowiańszczyzna w Europie średniowiecznej. Vol. 1. Wrocław: WERK. pp. 75–82. ISBN 83-901964-7-6.
- Álvarez-Pedrosa, Juan Antonio (2021). Sources of Slavic Pre-Christian Religion. Leiden: Koninklijke Brill. ISBN 978-90-04-44138-5.
