= Jerzy Strzelczyk =

Polish historian (born 1941)

- Born: 24 December 1941 (age 84); Poznań, Poland
- Education: Adam Mickiewicz University
- Occupation: Historian
- Spouse: Dorota Żołądź-Strzelczyk
- Children: 2

Jerzy Strzelczyk (born 24 December 1941 in Poznań) is a Polish historian, professor at the Adam Mickiewicz University.

== Works ==
- Goci – rzeczywistość i legenda. Warszawa. 1984. ISBN 83-06-00654-2.
- Zarys dziejów Niemiec i państw niemieckich powstałych po II wojnie światowej. Poznań. 1986. ISBN 83-210-0619-1. Co-authored with Antoni Czubiński.
- Iroszkoci w kulturze średniowiecznej Europy. Warszawa. 1987. ISBN 83-06-01344-1.
- Od Prasłowian do Polaków. Dzieje Narodu i Państwa Polskiego. Kraków. 1987. ISBN 83-03-02015-3.
- Szkice średniowieczne. Poznań. 1987. ISBN 83-210-0681-7.
- Historia i kultura cystersów w dawnej Polsce i ich europejskie związki. Poznań. 1987. ISBN 83-232-0035-1.
- Cystersi w kulturze średniowiecznej Europy. Poznań. 1992. ISBN 83-232-0357-1.
- Mieszko Pierwszy. Poznań. 1992. ISBN 83-900370-2-5. Second edition: Poznań 1999, ISBN 83-85811-64-8.
- Wandalowie i ich afrykańskie państwo. Warszawa. 1992. ISBN 83-06-02205-X. Second edition 2005, ISBN 83-06-02964-X.
- Spotkanie dwóch światów: Stolica Apostolska a świat mongolski w połowie XIII wieku: relacje powstałe w związku z misją Jana di Piano Carpiniego do Mongołów. Poznań. 1993. ISBN 83-85337-24-5.
- Monarchia pierwszych Piastów. Warszawa. 1994. ISBN 83-7115-015-6. Co-authored with Zofia Kurnatowska and Gerard Labuda.
- Apostołowie Europy. Poznań. 1997. ISBN 83-211-1202-1.
- Mity, podania i wierzenia dawnych Słowian. Poznań. 1998. ISBN 83-7120-688-7. Second edition Poznań 2007, ISBN 978-83-7301-973-7.
- Bolesław Chrobry. Poznań. 1999. ISBN 83-85811-70-2. Second edition Poznań 2003, ISBN 83-85811-88-5.
- Otto III. Wrocław. 2000. ISBN 83-04-04536-2.
- Odkrywanie Europy. Poznań. 2000. ISBN 83-7177-010-3.
- Zjazd gnieźnieński. Wrocław. 2000. ISBN 83-04-04536-2.
