= Knýtlinga saga =

Icelandic kings' saga

Knýtlinga saga (lit. 'The Saga of Cnut's Descendants') is an Icelandic kings' saga written in the 1250s, which deals with the kings who ruled Denmark from the early 10th century to the time when the book was written.

There are good reasons to assume that the author was Óláfr Þórðarson (d. 1259), nicknamed hvítaskáld ("the White Poet"), who was a nephew of Snorri Sturluson. Óláfr is also known for having written the Third Grammatical Treatise. He stayed with the Danish ruler Valdemar II of Denmark in 1240–1241, and Valdemar provided the saga's author with "a great deal of information" and "outstanding accounts".

The work is modelled on the Heimskringla, Snorri's work on the Norwegian kings. Like Snorri, the author makes frequent use of skaldic poetry as documentary sources.

The saga covers the history of the Danish rulers from the early 10th century until the 13th century. In the first part of its history, the saga resembles the synoptics in giving summaries of the major historical events, but later chapters, from those dealing with the sons of Svend Estridsen (d. mid-1070s) onwards, devote greater attention to the kings themselves. A central theme is the institution of kingship and all that it demanded of those who held royal office. The exemplary characters and behaviours of good kings such as Knútr the Holy (d. 1086) and Eiríkr the Good (d. 1103), are set off against those of incompetent or evil kings. Key benchmarks for good rulership include the promotion of peace and support of the church.

== Editions and translations ==
- ed. Bjarni Guðnason (1982). Danakonunga sögur. Íslenzk fornrit 35. Reykjavik.
- ed. Carl Petersen; Emil Olsen (1919–1925). Sogur Danakonunga. Copenhagen. pp. 29–294.
- tr. Hermann Pálsson; Paul Edwards (1986). Knytlinga Saga: The History of the Kings of Denmark. Odense: Odense University Press. Extracts available from De Re Militari.
- Kari Ellen Gade 2009, ‘Anonymous, Lausavísa from Knýtlinga saga’ in Kari Ellen Gade (ed.), Poetry from the Kings’ Sagas 2: From c. 1035 to c. 1300. Skaldic Poetry of the Scandinavian Middle Ages 2. Turnhout: Brepols, pp. 826–7.
