= Jaromarsburg =

Ancient cult location

Coordinates: 54°40′35.76″N 13°26′12.97″E

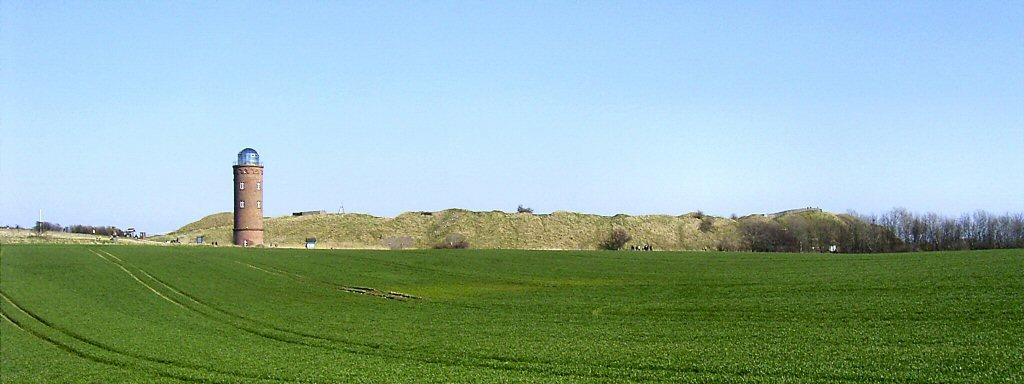
Ramparts of the Jaromarsburg

The Jaromarsburg was a cult site for the Slavic tribe of Rani dedicated to the god Svantovit and used from the 9th to the 12th century. It was located on the northeastern tip of the Baltic Sea island of Rügen at Cape Arkona, and was protected on two sides by the cliffed coast and from the land side by a Slavic burgwall.

At Cape Arkona in recent centuries, sections of the cliff tops have continually collapsed into the sea, which is why the remnants of the Jaromarsburg today mainly comprise the castle ramparts. Based on a loss of 10 to 20 metres per century, it is believed that the current area within the ramparts represents only a third of the original total. As a result, for several years urgent archaeological excavations have taken place that have uncovered the site of the Svetovid temple, which had been thought for a long time had been lost to coastal collapse. It is a rectangular area that was completely free of artifacts, but to find around which, however, articles were discovered that may have been offerings, including parts of broken weapons. This is consistent with the historical account by Saxo Grammaticus, who states that the priests inside the temple were not even allowed to breathe within its confines, so as not to defile it.

== Name ==
The name of Jaromarsburg is derived from the Rani prince, Jaromar I. He became the only Rani prince of Rügen (Ruja, Rujána, Rána) after his brother Tetislav (last mentioned in 1170). He was a vassal of the Danish king, Valdemar I, because Rügen was conquered by Denmark in 1168. Due to that, the all old temples were destroyed and Rani were forced to convert to Christianity. The name Jaromarsburg is not used in the historical documents and was given to the burgwall later. In 1937 and 1938, a theory gained in popularity, that Jaromarsburg is a different spelling of Jomsburg, a lost Viking/Slavic city. It was supported by an information on a map from 17th century, that placed Jomsburg near to the cape Arcona. An archeological research had been done in the sea area but findings could not confirm the theory. Some findings included stone pillars, walls, slingshot machine stones and a rune stone with the name "Ulf". The theory was, however, known much earlier. Some researchers believed that Jomsburg was a wrong spelling of Jaromarsburg, while others disputed this theory as early as the 18th century or earlier. Mémoires de la Société royale des antiquaires du Nord (1836–1839) mentions Arkona and Jaromars Burg as two different places that are situated close to each other, but with time, some authors started using the name Jaromarsburg interchangeably with Arkona.

Originally, during the time of its fame, the temple fort was known in chronicles and other texts as Arkona (Arcun, Arkún, Arcune, Arcon, Archon, Archona, Orcunde,...). The most used term, Arkona, was later given to the whole cape as its name.

The name itself in this form is most likely not the name Rani were using because Slavic names do not typically have A as their first letter, while e.g. Latin or German languages (used in most of the texts) use A at the beginning a lot (e.g. mare Adriaticum = moře Jaderské). The end of the word, -ona, is probably also a result of changes the Latin authors did to the original name. Based on his linguistic research of similar changes, author František Adolf Šubert in his work: Rujana, Wittow, Arkona: About the origin of these names assumes that the original form of the name was Jarkun, Jarkuon or Jarkůn. He based etymology of the name on the description of the temple provided by Saxo Grammaticus. According to that, the temple was using a lot of red paint (typical for Slavic people), mainly on its prominent red roof, and due to its location, it was giving a significant contrast to the white cliffs for people coming from the sea and to the blue water surface for people coming from the land. Many Slavic names use colors of some significant buildings or soil etc., e.g. in Poland and Russia, there is about 400 places with name connected to the red color. Therefore, Šubert believes, that the name Jarkun etymologically derivates from *jarъ, *jȃrъ, as well as the words jarý/jarký/jarka (= fresh, fiery, ardent, furious, springtime, strong, springy, young, bright - also directly red). In other Slavic countries can be found places named e.g. Jarkos (Serbia), Jarkovice (Czech Republic), Jarun lake (Croatia), Jarki, Jarków, Jarkouc, Jarka river and most importantly Jarkuszewo, later known as Arkuszewo (Poland). There are also other names of this kind known from the Rügen region (Garchen; Gartsin; Jarkowo, Jarcouwe, Jarchowe, Harchowe, Garchowe, Garchow, Garchova; Jarkvitz). Based on this information, Šubert came to the conclusion that Arkona was originally named Jarkun (or Jarkún, Jarkůn), meaning (fiery) red. Interestingly enough, the name Jaromarsburg (Jaromar) has the same origin from *jarъ (with added german word burg = castle).

Another researcher, J. Jacob, believed the name was Jarkon or Jarkuon, too. However, etymologically, he interpreted the meaning as Jarý koń (prime, lush, strong, the best horse — referring to the sacred horse of Svantovít). Such origin is, however, probably not right, because many Slavic temples of different gods had a sacred horse without naming their place after it. Šubert believes that it is not a feature specific enough to name this very important temple after it.

Dr. Beyersdorf believed the original name was Hargan (from harga), not a Slavic but German name and that before Rani the place belonged to the Holmrug tribe and Rani only kept the name, slightly changed into Arkun. That could possibly happen based on Gothic word arkina, meaning holy, clean. Šubert, however, thinks it's very unlikely for the old and strong Rani tribe to use Germanic words to name their most sacred temple — especially since all other parts of Rügen had clearly Slavic names.

There is no clear consensus about the original name's form or meaning.

== Structure ==
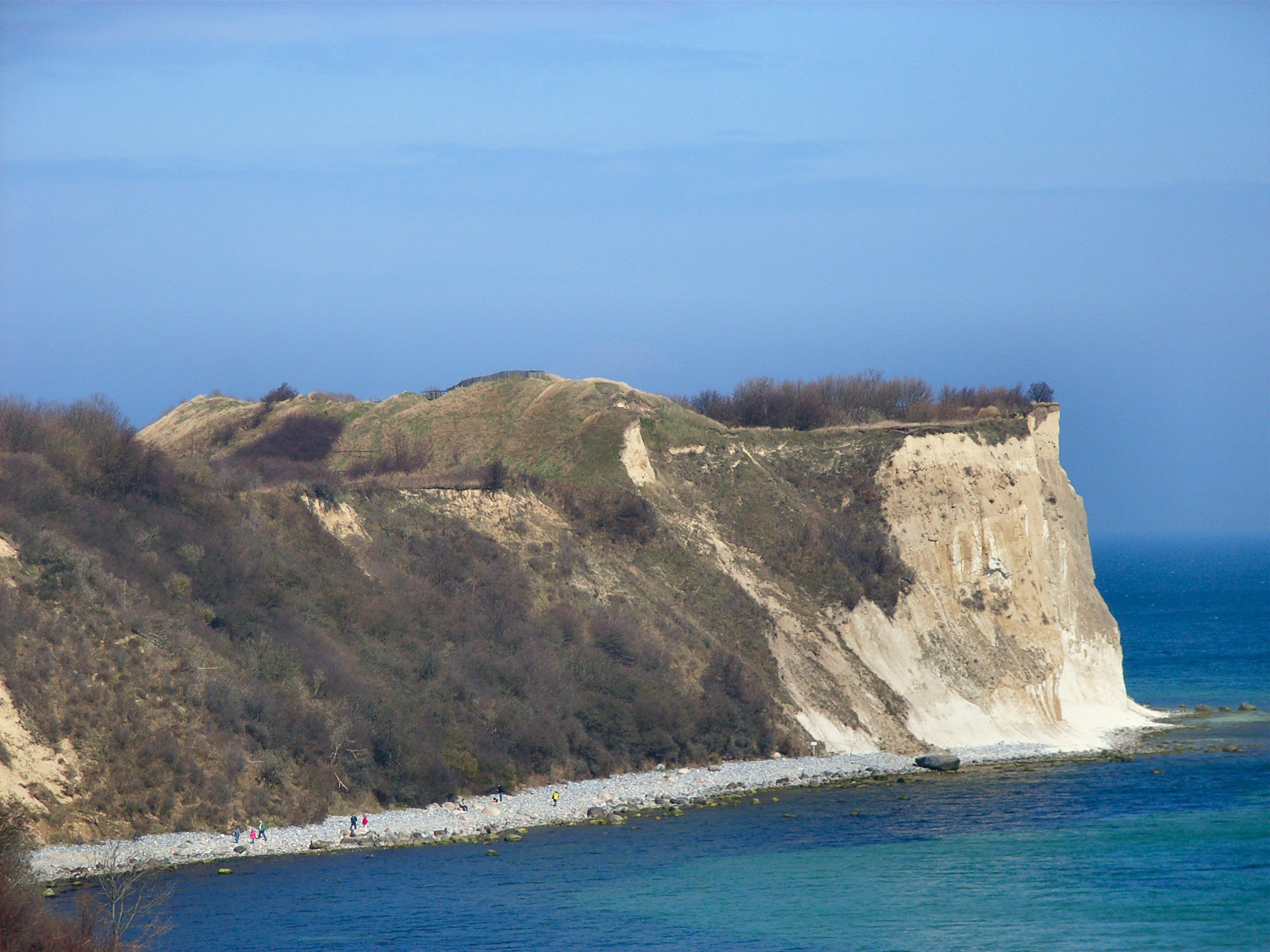
Ramparts on Cape Arkona

The castle consisted of two successive ramparts that reached a height of 13 metres, plus additional fortifications. The fortifications and the temple were made of wood. Originally, the fortifications extended 300 metres on a north-south axis and 350 metres east-west. According to the Danish historian Saxo Grammaticus, the temple was surrounded by two enclosures, the outer one covered by a purple roof. Inside was a four-metre-high statue of Svetovid, carved from an oak trunk. Saxo Grammaticus writes: In its right hand the figure held a drinking horn, made of various metals. The priest filled it each year with mead and from that which had been lost over the year prophesied about the coming harvest .

It is believed that settlements related to the temple were located on the sites where today the fishing villages of Vitt and Putgarten now stand. The name of the latter means "at the foot of the castle".

== History ==
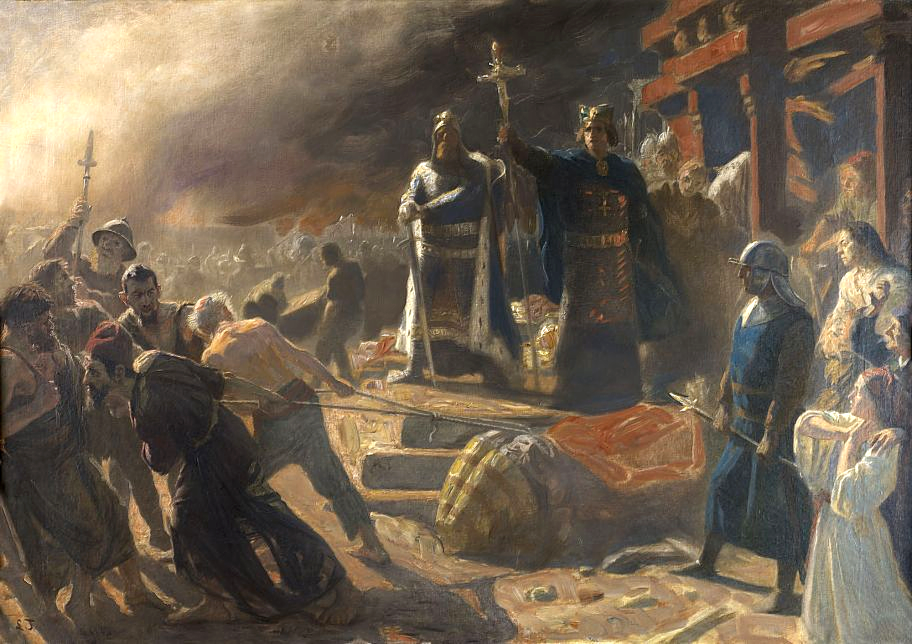
Bishop Absalon topples the god Svantevit at Arkona in 1169

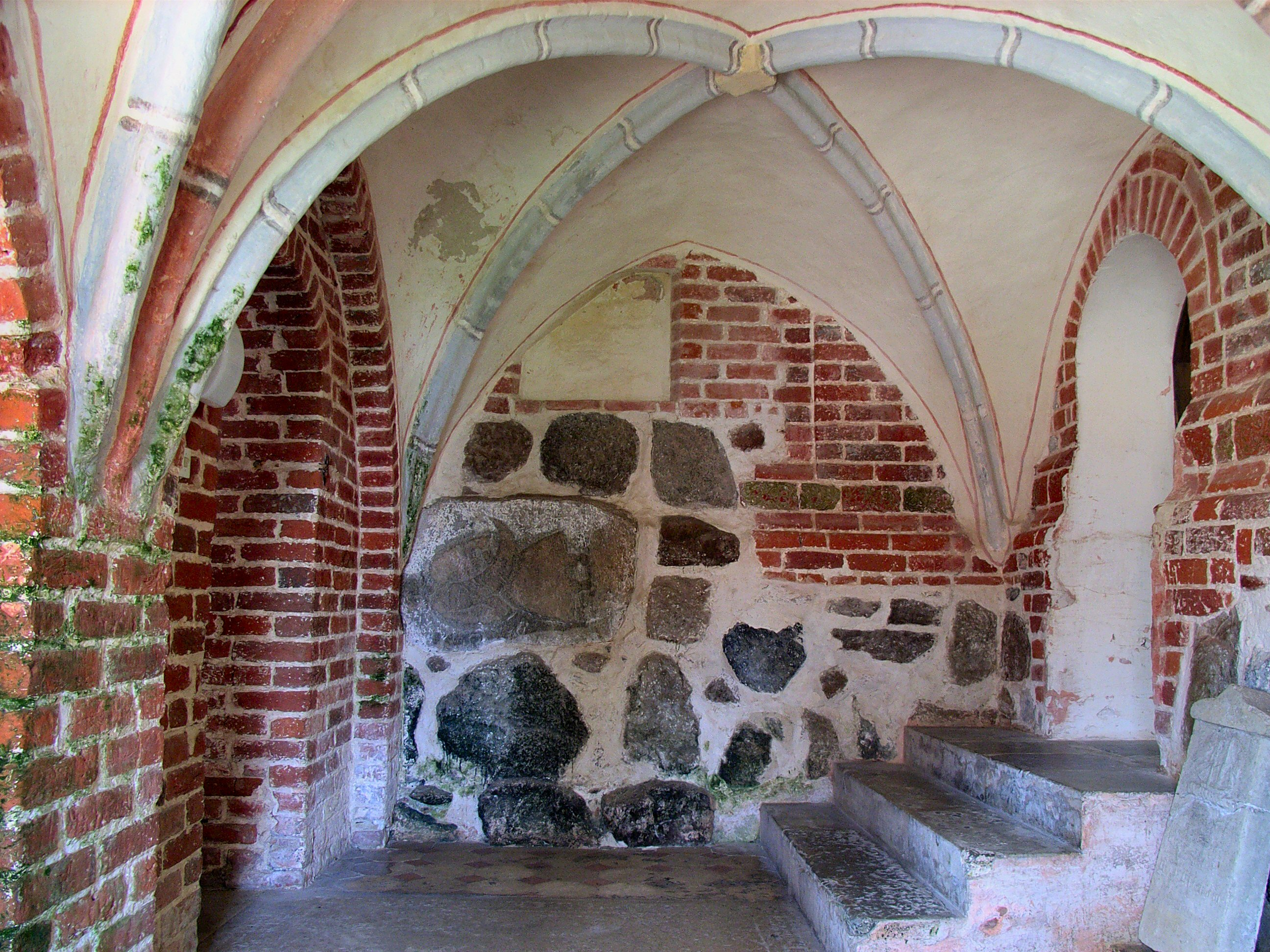
The Svantevit Stone

From about the 9th century the Rani settled on Rügen; they probably built the sanctuary at this time and then erected the castle and fortifications in several stages. In the 11th century the rampart was raised further using soil from the inner area of the castle. The Rani dominated Rügen for some time and the temple increased in importance as a religious centre for the Slavs in the southern Baltic following the destruction of Rethra in 1068. The temple served as oracle site and received offerings from other peoples, not just the Slavs.

But as early as 1136, a Danish army under King Eric the Memorable had captured the temple fortress. The defeated Rani pledged the adoption of Christianity but reneged on their agreement after the withdrawal of the Danes. In 1157, a storm destroyed a Slavic fleet of 1,500 ships off the Norwegian coast. The Danish king, Waldemar I, made used of this weakness to mount an offensive against Rügen, which was the stronghold of the Rani. After a series of attacks, ambushes and partial victories, he landed at Arkona with his fleet on 19 May 1168, accompanied by his army commander and close friend, Bishop Absalon. On 15 June 1168, the temple fortress was taken after four weeks of siege, when the attackers succeeded by day, in starting a fire at an unobserved point, which the defenders of the castle could not put out due to a shortage of water. The temple was then destroyed, the Svetovid statue chopped up and burned.

After the fall of the temple the princes of the Rügen Slavs, Tetzlav, who until then was the king of Rani, and his brother, Jaromar, who lived in their capital at Charenza, submitted to the Danish king. After the death of Tetzlav in 1170, Jaromar was Prince of the Rani until 1218. With the fall of the temple, King Valdemar got his hands on a treasure, but in 1171, he had to share this with his ally, Henry the Lion. The extensive estates of the temple were given to the Church.

In 1169 Rügen came under the suzerainty of the bishops of Lund, who oversaw the spread of Christianity. Numerous chapels were built on former cult and burial places. In the area of the former Svetovid sanctuary, the first Christian church was built on Rügen. In the nearby church of Altenkirchen, the building of which had probably already begun by 1185, is the Priest Stone (Priesterstein) or Svantevit Stone (Svantevitstein) – just above the foundation base – which is laid on its side. There are different interpretations of this stone. It is possible that the stone relief was carved in the pre-Christian era on Rügen, and could have represented the Slavic god, Svantevit, to the priest, because only he had the right to touch the large and ornate drinking horn of Svantevit's. But it could also be the gravestone of Prince Tetzlav, who had been given the peninsula of Wittow, after the Danish conquest of Rügen. Furthermore, it is assumed that the position of the stone represents the superiority of God over the pagan gods.

== Archaeological investigations ==
The Jaromarsburg at Arkona is the only rampart for which we have detailed contemporaneous accounts. The castle was investigated by archaeologists multiple times due to the erosion constantly occurring around the castle. An information board in the Archaeological exhibition in Schwerin in 1995 showed this very clearly. The castle area has decreased in 1000 years to 1/3 of its original size.

This led the archaeologists to investigate the castle before it disappeared completely in the sea. Carl Schuchardt, an archaeologist from Berlin, undertook in 1921 the first known investigation. An important finding was that the written reports of the Saxos were correct and the space around the temple as a place of worship was empty. The west of the temple showed a smaller, but now leveled Wall, behind the big Wall which showed the living area. Whether that was meant for the cult priests and their servants or as a refuge for the surrounding settlements as well as a craft store, could not be determined until today.

In 1930, Wilhelm Petzsch investigated the wall and documented the findings. The most important result was that he found the fight film from 1136 (conquest by Danish King Erich II) under the combat and fire layer from 1168 (Danish King Waldemar I.). A deeper burnt layer was still present, which he dated to 1000.

== Literature ==
- Petzsch-Martiny: Wall and gate of temple festivals Arkona. Prähist. Journal XXI, p 237 ff u. 262, 1930
- Carl Schuchhardt : Arkona, Rethra, Vineta. Berlin 1926th
- Petzsch: A Viking Fund of Arkona. In: Releases the antiquities collection Greifswald. Volume VII, 1935
- Astrid Tummuscheit: The stove all errors – The Tempelburg Arkona on the northern tip of Rügen. In: . Archaeological discoveries in Mecklenburg-Vorpommern(= . Archaeology in Mecklenburg-Vorpommern Band 5), State Office for Culture and Preservation, Schwerin 2009, p 157 ff,
