= Ludwig Gotthard Kosegarten =

German poet and Lutheran preacher (1758-1818)

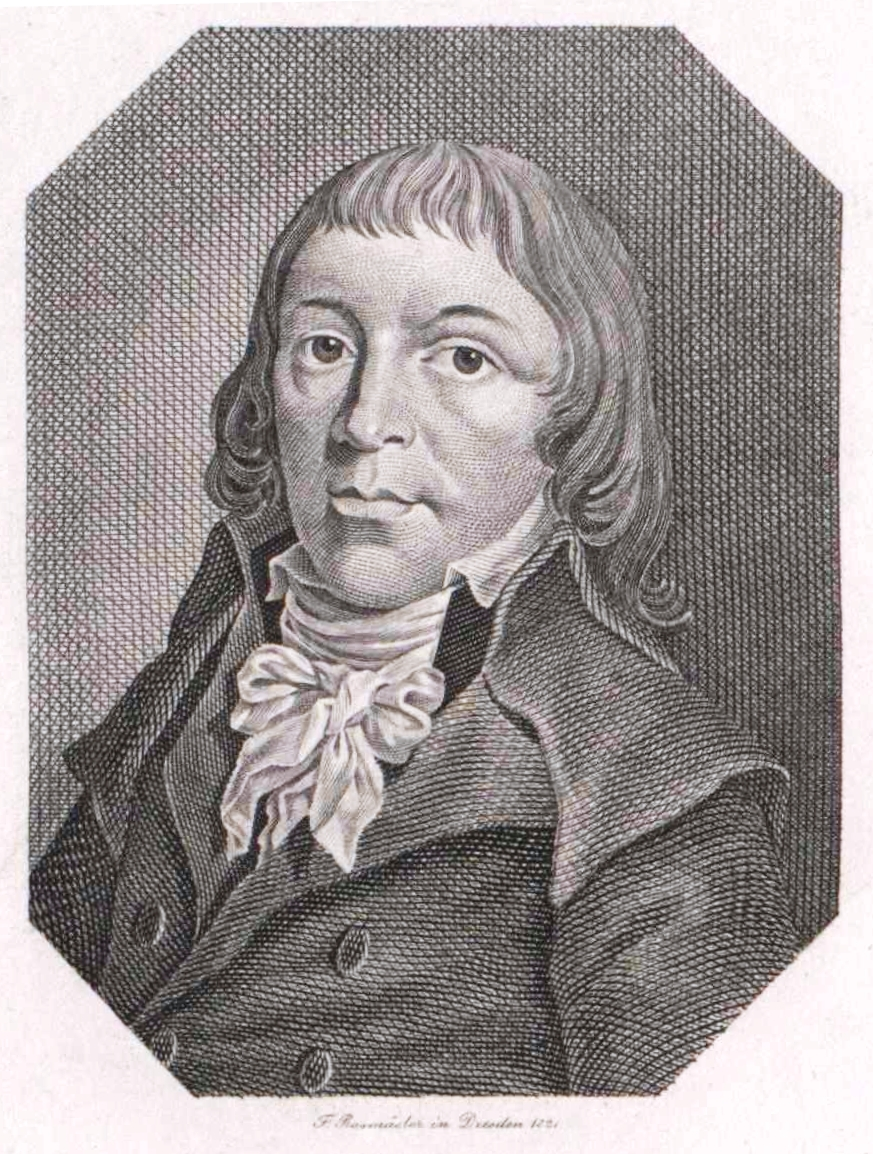
Ludwig Gotthard Kosegarten.

Ludwig Gotthard Kosegarten (1 February 1758 – 26 October 1818), also known as Ludwig Theobul or Ludwig Theoboul, was a German poet and Lutheran preacher. His son Gottfried (1792-1860) became an orientalist, Arabist, and historian at Jena and Greifswald.

== Life and work ==
Kosegarten was born in Grevesmühlen, to pastor Bernhard Christian (1722–1803) and Sophia née Buttstädt in the Duchy of Mecklenburg-Schwerin. He studied theology at the University of Greifswald and also philosophy under J.C. Muhrbeck. He then served as the pastor of Altenkirchen on the island of Rügen, then part of Swedish Pomerania. In 1777 he gave a speech on the birthday of King Gustaf III and wrote a hymn for the occasion. In 1781 he took his theology exam and in 1785 he was a headmaster of a school at Wolgast.

After his ordination in 1792 he was given the rectorate in the parish church of Altenkirchen on Rügen. He received a doctorate in theology at Rostock the next year. While he was a parish priest he gave the famous shore sermons on the cliffs near Vitt. He went there to the herring fishermen, who during the time of herring fishing could not go to the church in Altenkirchen due to their work. These sermons were a great success, which is why the Vitt Chapel was erected in 1806. During his stay on Rügen he wrote many reports about the island, that made both Rügen and Kosegarten famous. He wrote to poems Jucunde (1803) and Die Inselfahrt (1805) with landscape descriptions. In 1808 he became a professor of history at the University of Greifswald.

When the French occupied Pomerania he gave a speech on the birthday of Napoleon and was treated as a Bonapartist. leading to his books being burned at the Wartburg festival on 18 October 1817. He influenced the work of Philipp Otto Runge, Caspar David Friedrich, and the music of Franz Schubert.

== Other sources ==
- Lewis Holmes. Kosegarten: The Turbulent Life & Times of a Northern German Poet. Peter Lang, Jan 1, 2004
