= Gesundbrunnen =

Gesundbrunnen is the name of the following places and facilities in Germany:

- Gesundbrunnen (Berlin), a subdistrict of Bezirk Mitte in Berlin and also there:
  - Berlin-Gesundbrunnen station
  - Stadion am Gesundbrunnen (demolished in 1974), former home ground of Hertha BSC football club
- Gesundbrunnen (Bautzen), a subdistrict of the Saxon town of Bautzen
- Gesundbrunnen (Halle), a subdistrict of Halle (Saale) in Saxony-Anhalt and the spring of the same name
- Gesundbrunnen (Hofgeismar), a subdistrict of Hofgeismar
- Diesdorfer Gesundbrunnen, a spring in the village of Diesdorf on the city territory of Magdeburg
- The SLK Clinic "am Gesundbrunnen" in Heilbronn
- Gesundbrunnen (Sagard), spa and bathing institution on the island of Rügen
