= Vitt =

Coordinates: 54°39′57″N 13°25′54″E

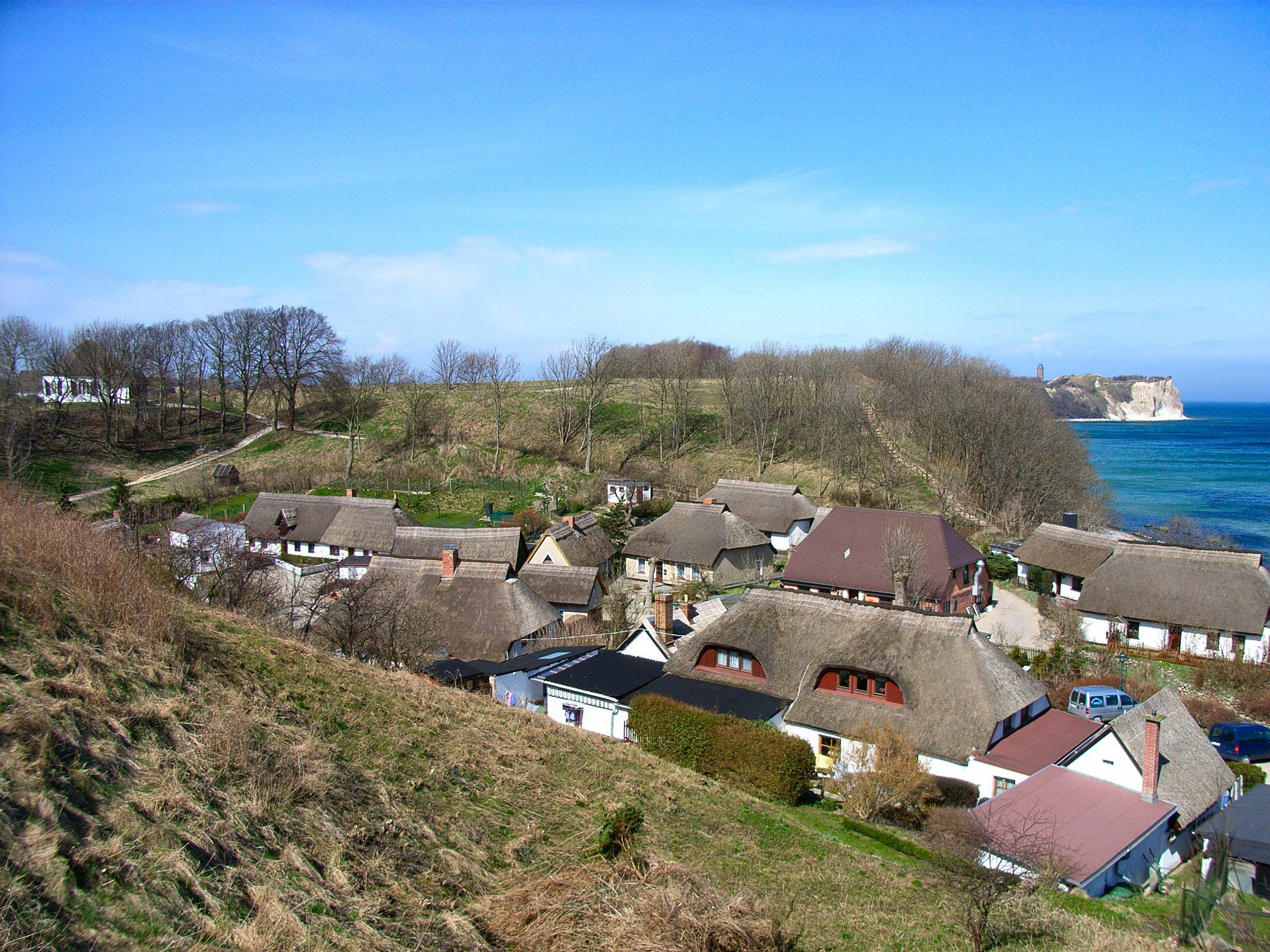
Vitt fishing village

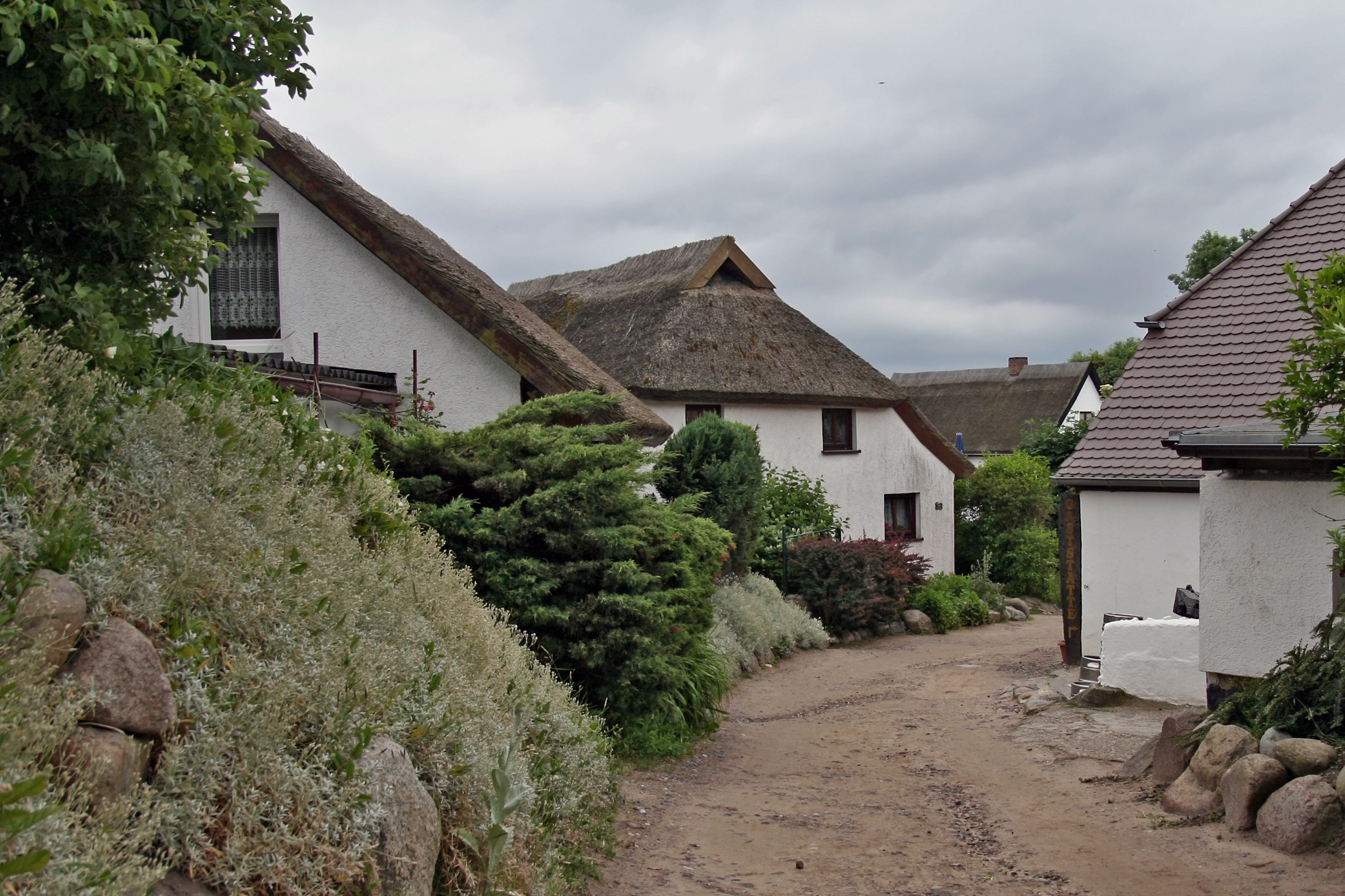
Houses in Vitt

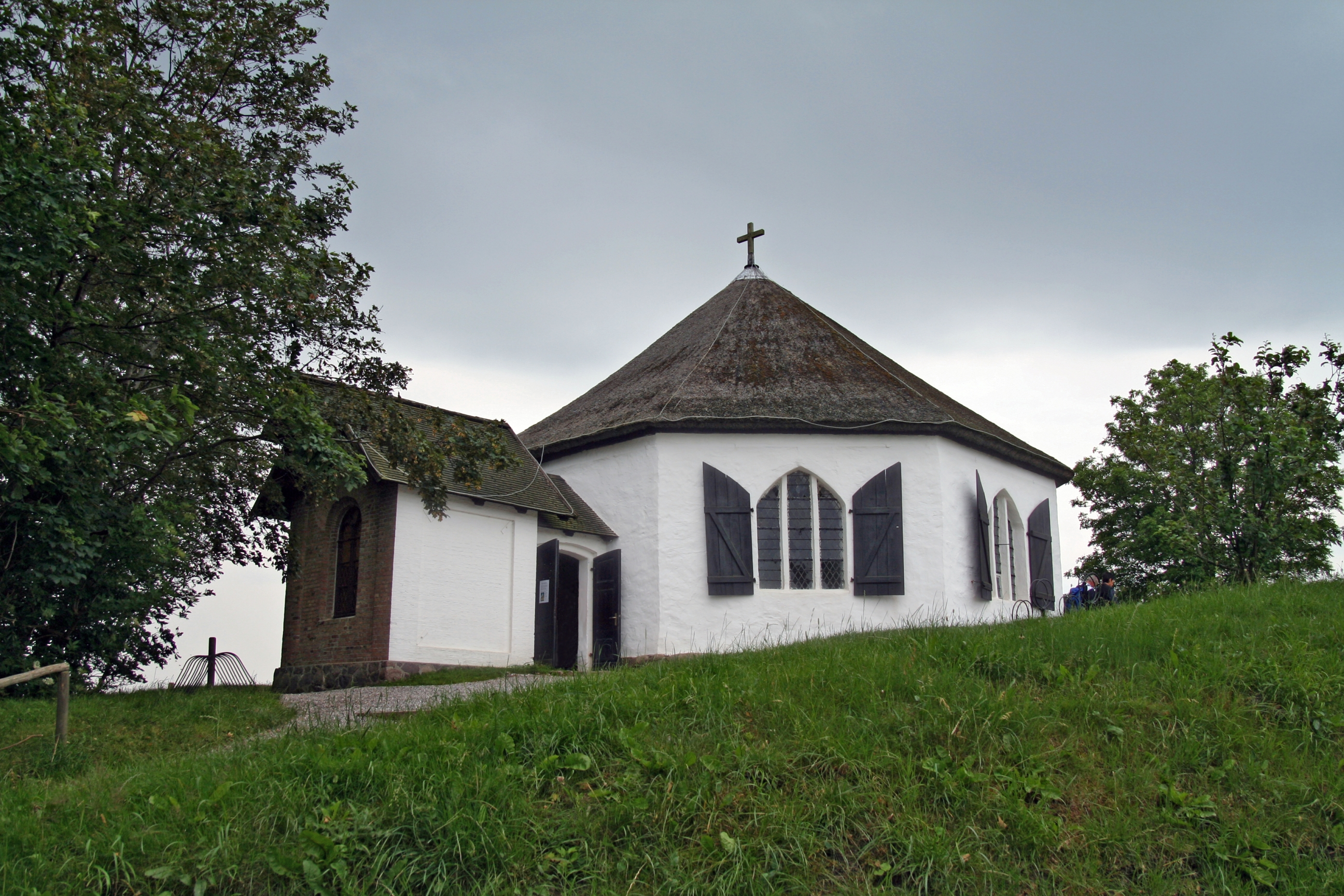
Chapel near Vitt

The fishing village of Vitt lies on the German Baltic Sea island of Rügen, more precisely on the Wittow peninsula near Cape Arkona. The village is part of the municipality of Putgarten. Because of its location in a coastal gully on the cliffed coast, called Liete, Vitt is not visible from afar. However, from the edge of the gully there is a view over the thatched roofs of the village. It is a popular tourist destination; often described as "the most romantic place on Rügen". The Marco Polo guide rates it as one of the top 15 highlights on the island of Rügen.

== Name ==
The name Vitt is derived from the word Vitte(n)/Witte (German: "depot of a Hanseatic town where fish was processed"; Swedish: vittja = "landing place, trading post and stockyard"). Actually Vitt was only a temporarily occupied Vitte from the outset where fish that had been caught were processed (cf. Vitte). The name could however also come from Vit, a common Slavic name (for the founder of a settlement), or witt for "white" because of its white houses.

Because there is no record of its foundation, the exact age of the village is unknown. According to the reports of Danish historian, Saxo Grammaticus, the village was probably already in existence by the 10th century as a fishing and trading port belonging to the Slavic Jaromarsburg on Cape Arkona.

It was first mentioned in the records on 25 May 1290, when the Rügen prince, Witzlaw II, granted the place the right and freedom to fish.

Above the village is the little Vitt Chapel, whose construction began in 1806 and was finally completed in 1816. It was built because more and more visitors came to hear the shore sermons of Altenkirchen pastor, Ludwig Gotthard Kosegarten, and there was no room for several of the visitors in the fishing huts during bad weather.

The village, which is under heritage protection is very well preserved and receives a constant stream of tourists. In the small harbour, trips in fishing boats around Cape Arkona may be booked.

Vitt is best accessed on bicycle, horse-drawn coach or with the Arkona-Bahn from Putgarten. No private cars are allowed because driving around the cape is only allowed with special permission.
