= Johann Gottfried Ludwig Kosegarten =

German orientalist

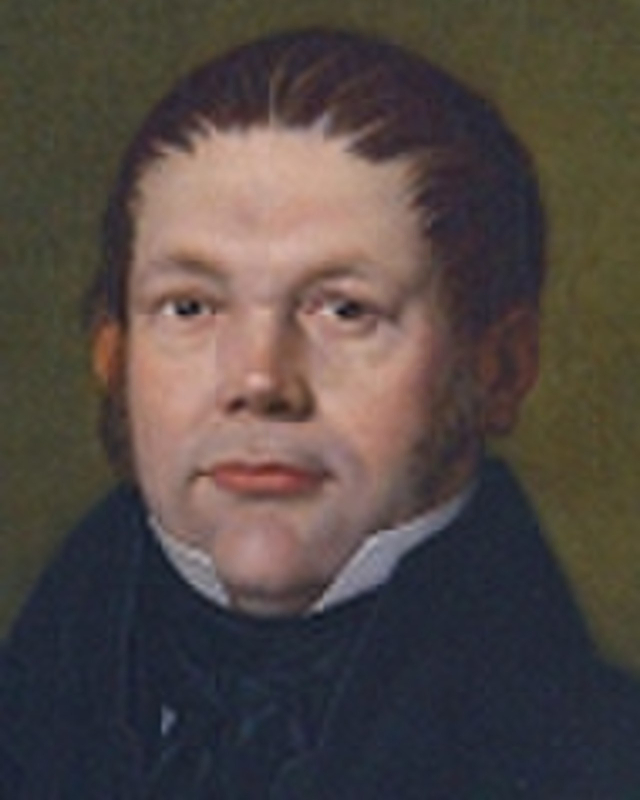
- Portrait of Kosegarten
- Born: 10 September 1792; Altenkirchen, Rügen, Holy Roman Empire (today Germany)
- Died: 18 August 1860 (aged 67); Greifswald, German Confederation
- Known for: Translation and edition of Arabic, Persian and Sanskrit poems, songs and fables
- Parent: Ludwig Gotthard Kosegarten (father)

Academic background
- Education: University of Greifswald
- Influences: Johann Wolfgang von Goethe

Academic work
- Discipline: Orientalism
- Sub-discipline: Old Testament exegesis and oriental languages
- Institutions: University of Jena (1817-1824)
- Notable works: Geschichte der Universität Greifswald

Johann Gottfried Ludwig Kosegarten (10 September 1792, in Altenkirchen – 18 August 1860, in Greifswald) was a German orientalist born in Altenkirchen on the island of Rügen. He was the son of ecclesiastic Ludwig Gotthard Kosegarten (1758–1818).

== Life and work ==
Kosegarten was the son of the poet and pastor Ludwig Gotthard Kosegarten. He received his early education at home and through private tutors who included Ernst Moritz Arndt, Hermann Baier, and Karl Lappe. When his father moved in 1808 to the University of Greifswald, he too went to the university and studied theology and philosophy. From 1812 he studied Oriental languages in Paris attending the lectures of Silvestre de Sacy. In 1815 he became an adjunct to the theological and philosophical faculty in Greifswald. From 1817 to 1824 he was a professor of Oriental languages at the University of Jena. During this time he came in contact with Goethe and was involved in promoting Arabic literature. Kosegarten later moved to the University of Greifswald where he specialized in Old Testament exegesis and oriental languages.

Kosegarten is remembered for translation and edition of Arabic, Persian and Sanskrit poems, songs and fables. His principal work included the Arab song collection Kitab al-Aghani (1846), the Hindu poem Nala (1820), the Persian fairy tale collection Tuti Nameh (1822) and the Indian fable collection Pantscha Tantra (1848). He was also a specialist at deciphering ancient Egyptian hieroglyphics.

In 1856–57 Kosegarten was author of a two-volume work on the history of the University of Greifswald called Geschichte der Universität Greifswald. His handwritten notes and collection of German and Oriental works were bequeathed to the University of Greifswald.

== Books ==
- Kosegarten, J. G. L. (1828). Chrestomathia Arabica ex codicibus manuscriptis Parisiensibus, Gothanis et Berolinensibus collecta atque tum adscriptis vocalibus (in Latin). Lipsiae: Sumtu F. C. G. Vogelii. (pp. 115 -123: Al-Maqrizi, History of the Fatimites)

== Other sources ==
- Klaus-Gunther Wesseling: KOSEGARTEN, Johann Gottfried Ludwig. In: Biographisch-Bibliographisches Kirchenlexikon (BBKL). Band 4, Bautz, Herzberg 1992, ISBN 3-88309-038-7, Sp. 535–537.
