= Nord-Rügen =

- Amt
- Location of Nord-Rügen within Vorpommern-Rügen district
- Interactive map of Nord-Rügen
- Location within Germany Location within Mecklenburg-Vorpommern
- Coordinates: 54°37′N 13°21′E
- Country: Germany
- State: Mecklenburg-Vorpommern
- District: Vorpommern-Rügen
- Seat: Sagard
- Subdivisions: 8 municipalities

Area
  - Total: 161.52 km^{2} (62.36 sq mi)

Population (2025-12-31)
  - Total: 7,528
  - Density: 46.61/km^{2} (120.7/sq mi)
- Time zone: UTC+01:00 (CET)
  - Summer (DST): UTC+02:00 (CEST)
- Website: www.amt-nord-ruegen.de

Nord-Rügen is an Amt in the district of Vorpommern-Rügen, in Mecklenburg-Vorpommern, Germany. The seat of the Amt is in Sagard.

The Amt Nord-Rügen consists of the following municipalities:

1. Altenkirchen
2. Breege
3. Dranske
4. Glowe
5. Lohme
6. Putgarten
7. Sagard
8. Wiek
