= Putgarten =

- Municipality
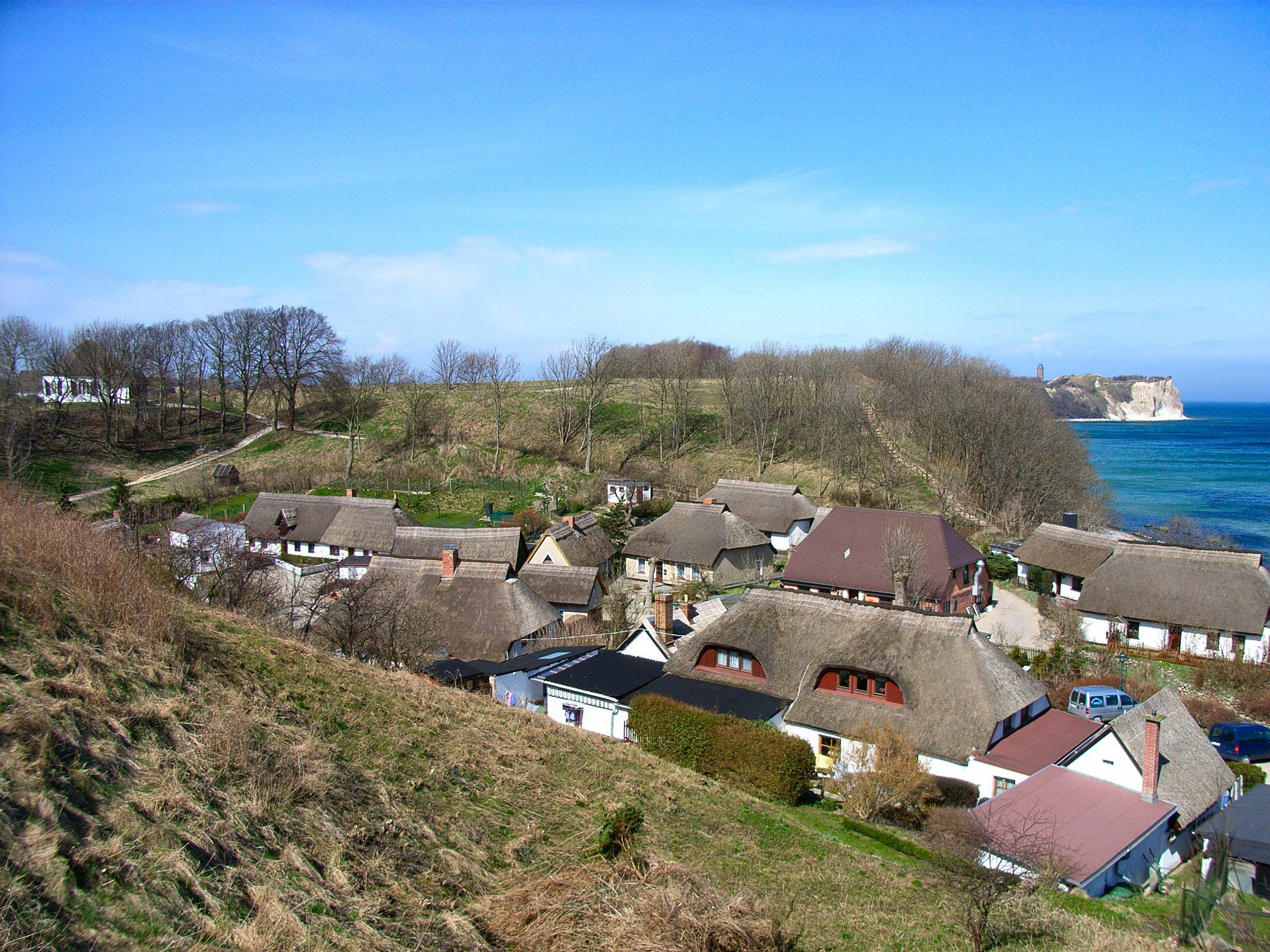
- Village of Vitt and Cape Arkona, part of Putgarten

- Location of Putgarten within Vorpommern-Rügen district
- Interactive map of Putgarten
- Location within Germany Location within Mecklenburg-Vorpommern
- Coordinates: 54°40′24″N 13°25′03″E
- Country: Germany
- State: Mecklenburg-Vorpommern
- District: Vorpommern-Rügen
- Municipal assoc.: Nord-Rügen

Government
  - Mayor: Ernst Heinemann

Area
  - Total: 12.65 km^{2} (4.88 sq mi)
- Elevation: 25 m (82 ft)

Population (2025-12-31)
  - Total: 180
  - Density: 14/km^{2} (37/sq mi)
- Time zone: UTC+01:00 (CET)
  - Summer (DST): UTC+02:00 (CEST)
- Postal codes: 18556
- Dialling codes: 038391
- Vehicle registration: RÜG

Putgarten is a municipality in the Vorpommern-Rügen district, in Mecklenburg-Vorpommern, Germany.

The municipality is administered by the Amt of Nord-Rügen with its seat in Sagard. Putgarten is the northernmost municipality in the state of Mecklenburg-Vorpommern. It is also the northernmost municipality in what was formerly East Germany. Villages within its boundaries are Arkona, Fernlüttkevitz, Goor, Nobbin, Vitt and Varnkevitz.
