= Gesundbrunnen (Sagard) =

Coordinates: 54°31′41″N 13°33′26″E

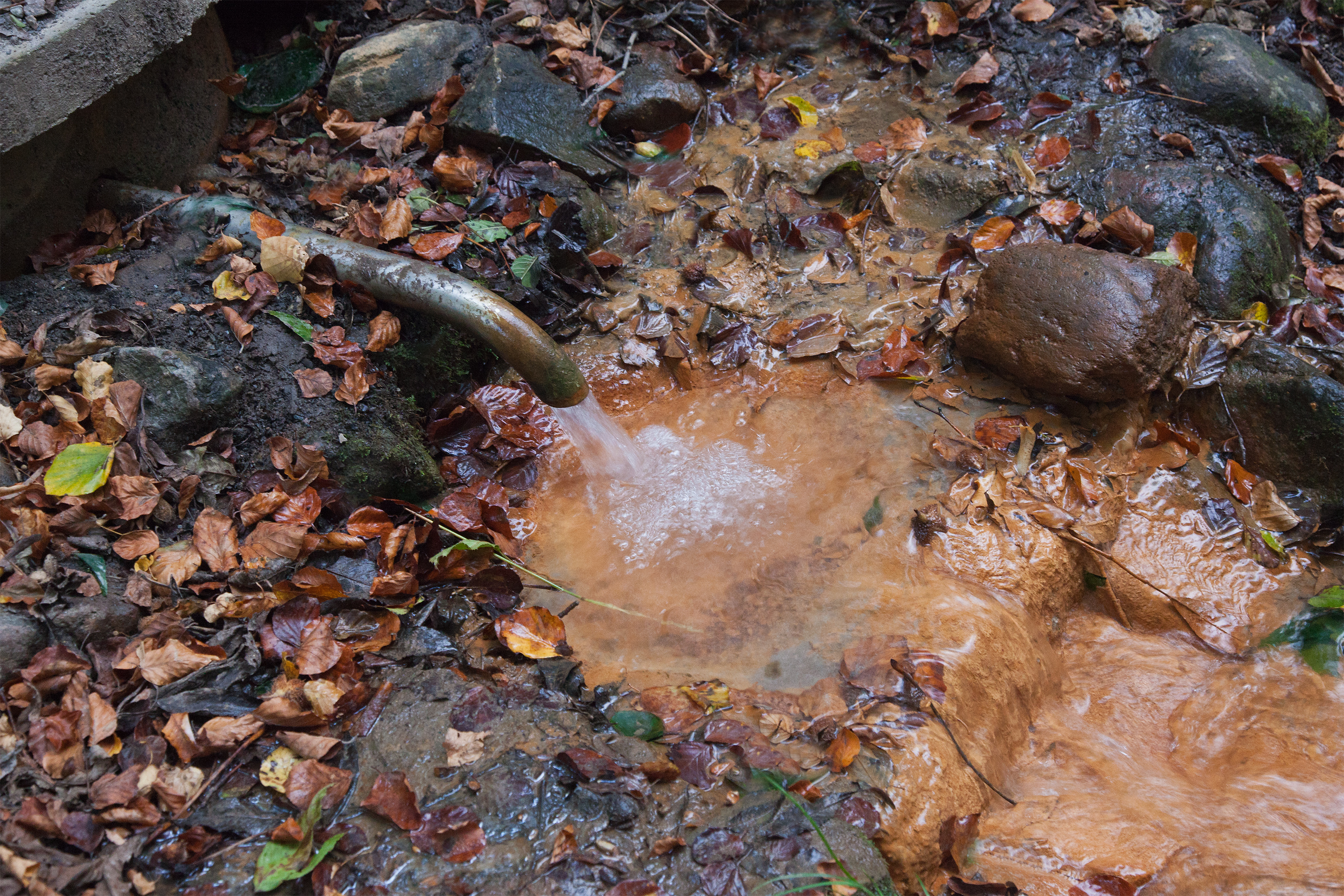
Former main spring

The Gesundbrunnen Sagard ("health spring of Sagard") was a spa and bathing institution in Sagard on the German Baltic Sea island of Rügen. Opened in 1795, it made Sagard the first bathing resort on Rügen and founded a healing spring establishment, that lasted until about 1830.

== History ==
=== Beginnings ===
There were the beginnings of bathing establishments in Sagard in the mid-18th century. Its basis was the springs containing iron, lime, and carbon dioxide, which flow into the Sagarder Bach through meadows called the "Brunnenaue". At the end of the 18th century, the pastor, Heinrich Christoph von Willich, (1759–1827) had several of the springs on church land cleaned and tapped, squares and paths laid out, and a bathing house constructed. The "Spring, Bathing and Leisure Institution" opened on 4 July 1795. Sagard was thus the first bathing resort on Rügen. Willich's brother, Dr. Moritz von Willich, who was the state physician of Rügen and Swedish Pomerania, promoted the development of the bathing establishment by writing two promotional leaflets for the mineral spring. He wrote:

The little brook enchants [the visitor] with its little waterfalls here, and the gentle babbling of its meandering course through the meadow. Uncommonly graceful are the two footpaths along the Brunnen-Aue, one lower down, the other running on higher terrain. Among the delights of another kind, which are there: a carousel, bowling alley, game tables, wheel of fortune, swing, seesaws, and pucks, music and dance have not been omitted.

=== Success ===
Even in the opening year, about 100 spa visitors were recorded, primarily members of noble Rügen families and officials from Stralsund and Greifswald. The bath house built for them had a room for warm baths, a shower bath and two rooms for hot and cold spray, drip, knee and foot baths. The bathers were accommodated at the Lindenhaus inn and various private homes. Their care and counselling was undertaken by Dr. Moritz von Willich; a special spa doctor was not appointed. By the first decade of the 19th century, the number of bathers, some of whom were from abroad, grew to 500. Amongst the most famous bathers were Christoph Wilhelm Hufeland, Martin Heinrich Klaproth, Heinrich von Kleist and Wilhelm von Humboldt. The high level of interest in the health spa at Sagard may be explained by the prevailing zeitgeist of the Romanesque period. The undisturbed nature on Rügen fascinated visitors. Christoph von Willich encouraged this fascination, by making a path up to the chalk cliffs of the Stubbenkammer. Its construction, which included a 600-step descent to the Baltic Sea beach, counts as the first measure to develop the natural environment of Rügen for tourists.

=== Competition and decline ===
Around 1810 the bathing facility declined due to the occupation of Rügen by Napoleon's troops and the associated Napoleonic Wars. As early as 1807 Christoph von Willich had resigned from the post of spa director. Due to the decline of the bathing facility, plans to expand the mineral baths, which included the construction of a dance hall, a belvedere and other avenues, were not implemented. The foundation of the residence town of Putbus (1810) and the construction of the bathhouse in Goor (1817/1818) in the vicinity were additional competition. By the start of the 19th century, free swimming in the Baltic Sea came into fashion, instead of the use of traditional baths. Nevertheless, in 1818, a local tenant started up the bathing facility again. In 1819, the chronicler, Johann Jakob Grümbke, wrote: "Sagard on Jasmund (has) 106 houses and 614 inhabitants, with a health spring [Gesundbrunnen], which is quite popular." The success did not last; as Friedrich Karl von Strombeck reported in 1833: "Sagard, where a deserted and dilapidated health spa [...]"

=== Current situation ===
Today, the Historic Brunnenaue Park (Historische Parkanlage Brunnenaue) recalls the glory of the former spa park with its promenades, fountains and bathhouses, displaying information of the first bathing establishing on Rügen at the actual historical site. The park was inaugurated on 7 April 2007 after being partially reconstructed.

== Gallery ==
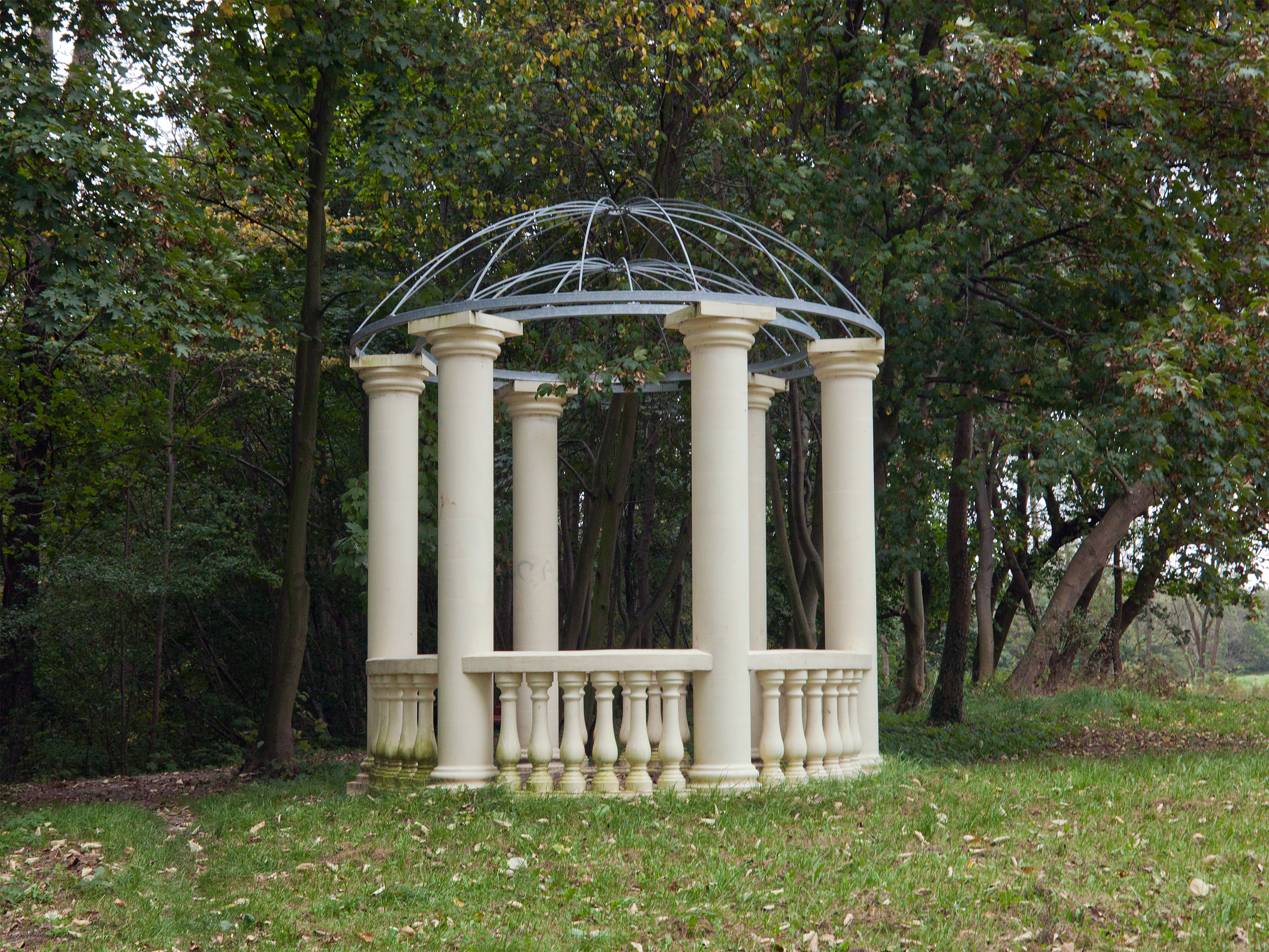

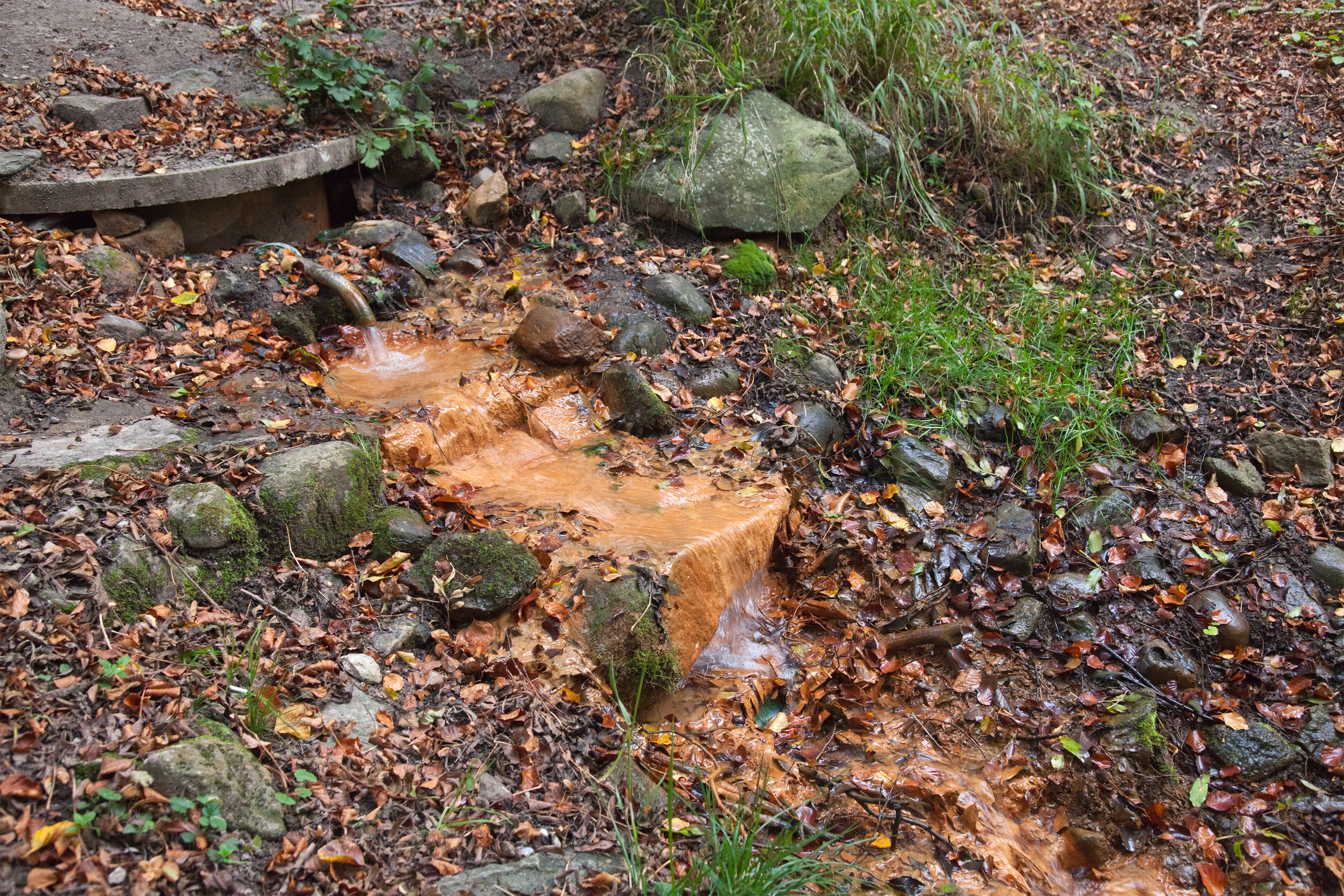

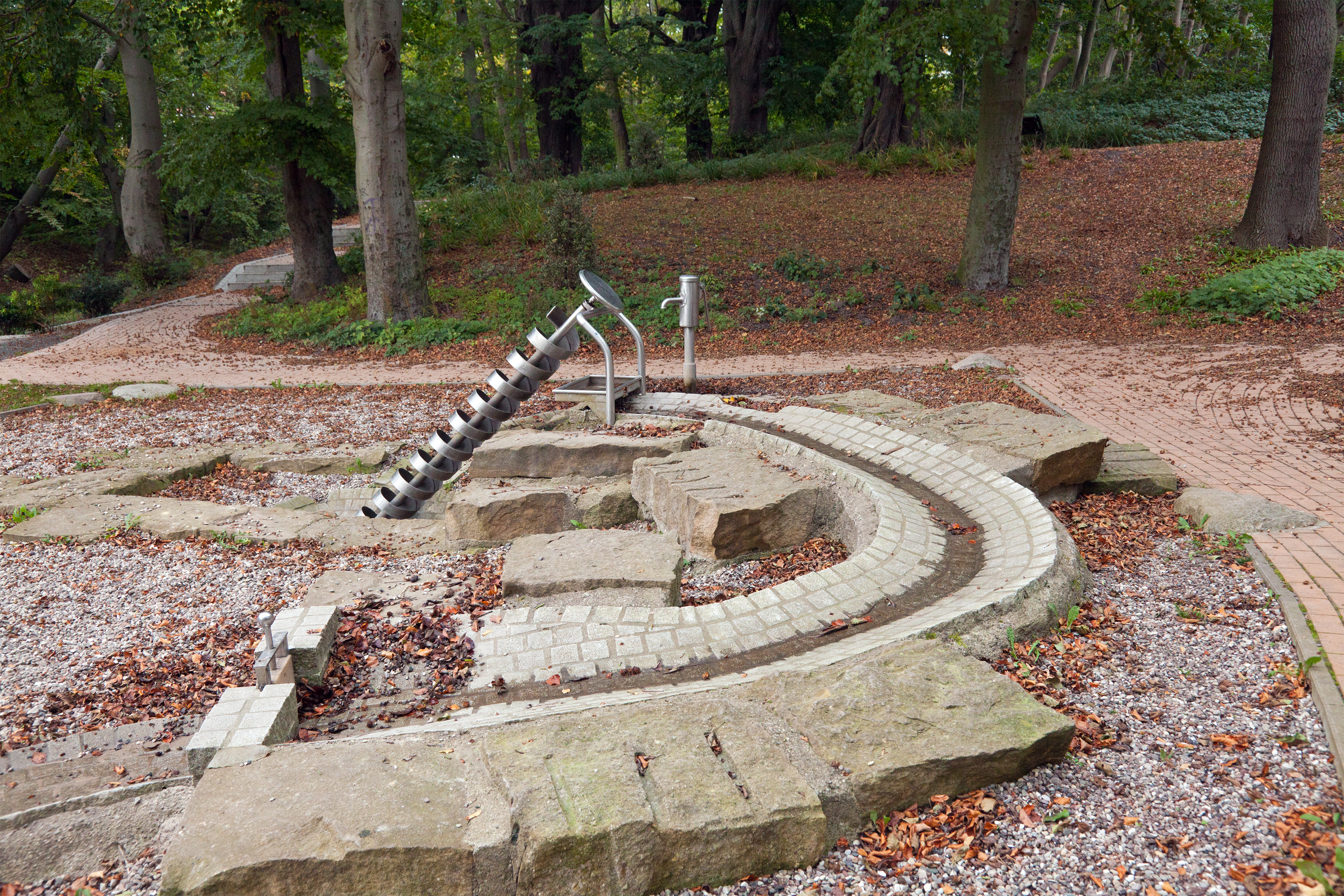

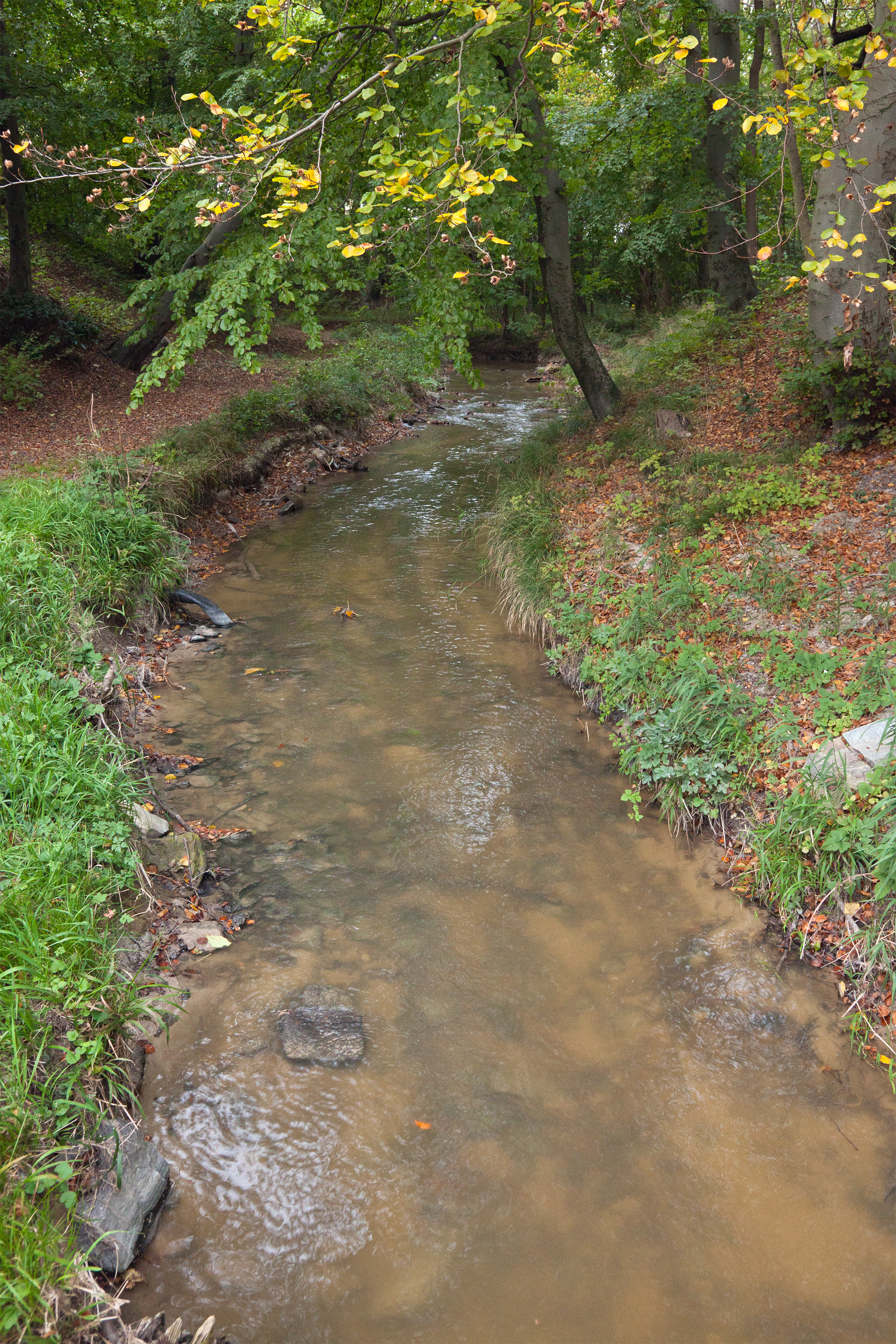

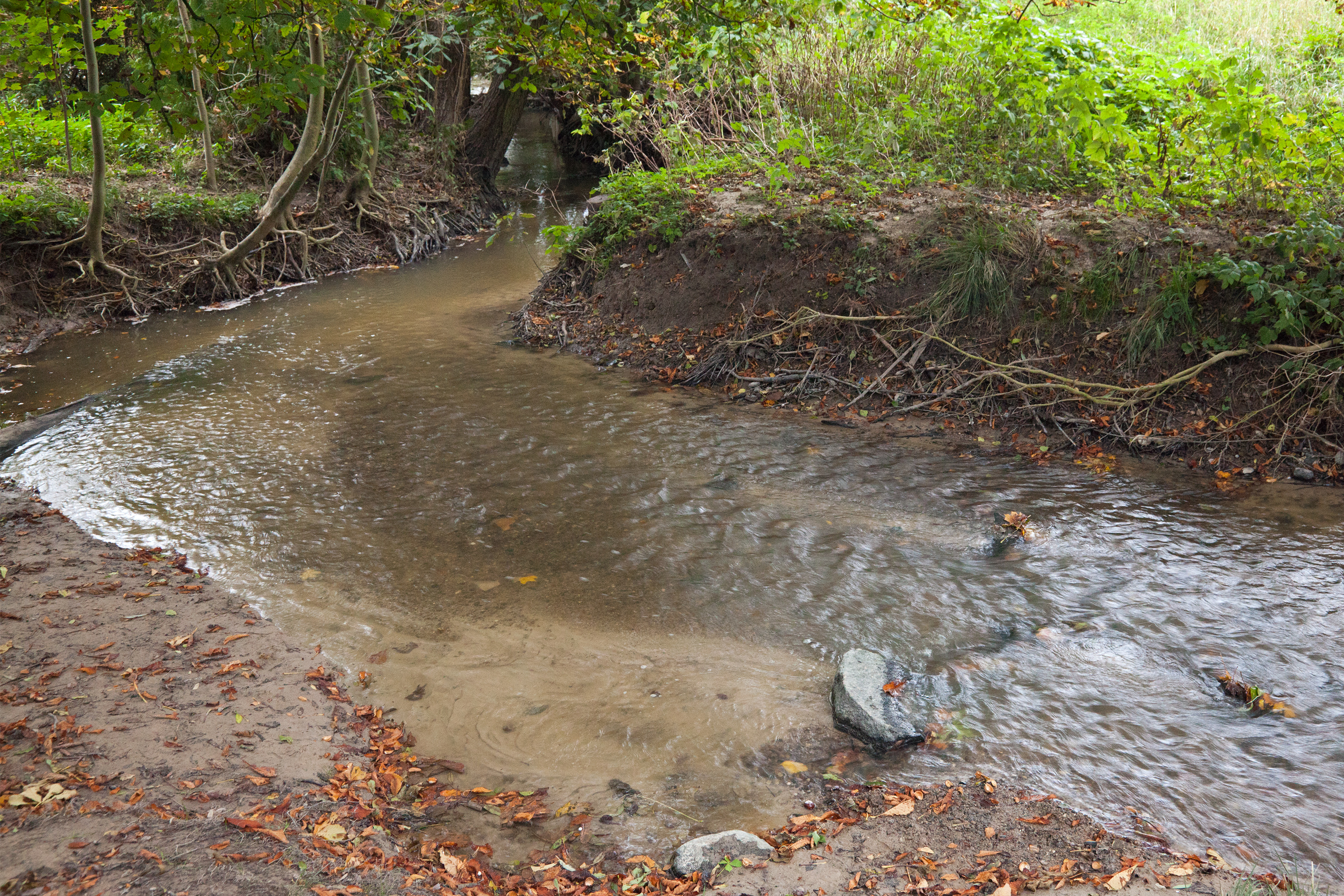

== Literature ==
- Andre Farin: Der Gesundbrunnen in Sagard. in: Insula Rugia e. V. (Hrsg.): Rügener Heimatkalender 1994. Prora 1993, pp. 58–63.
- Andre Farin: Der Gesundbrunnen von Sagard – Der Pastor und sein Mineralbad. in: Ostsee-Zeitung Rostock, 13 October 1999, S. 18.
- Paul Leesch: Mehr der Gegend als der Kur wegen? Badegäste in Sagard auf Rügen. in: Norddeutsche neueste Nachrichten Rostock, 23 January 1998, p. 23.
- Moritz von Willich: Nachricht vom Gesundbrunnen zu Sagard auf Jasmund. Bergen, 1795.
