= Cape Arkona =

Cape on the island of Rügen in Mecklenburg-Vorpommern, Germany

Coordinates: 54°40′35″N 13°26′16″E

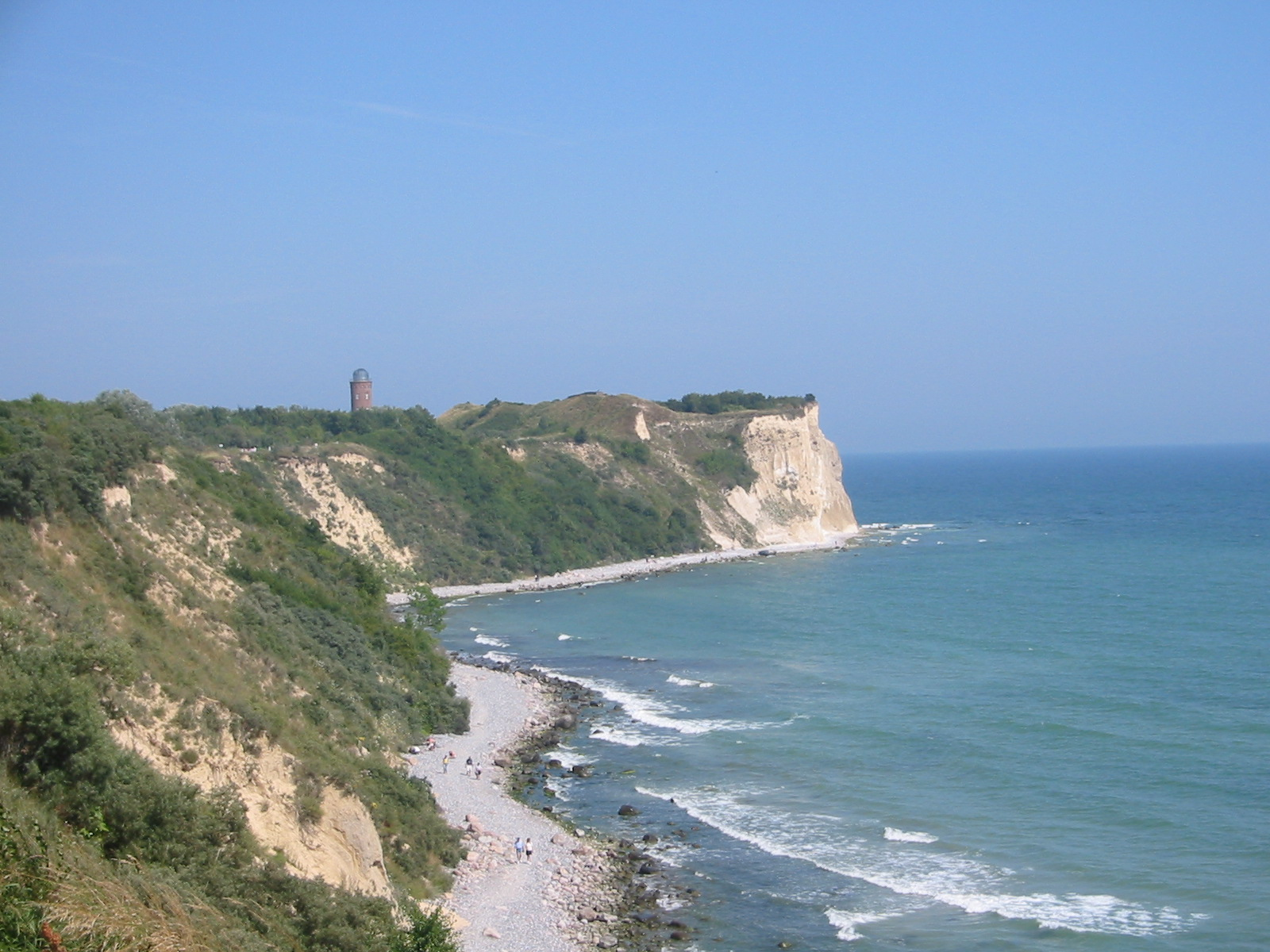
View of Cape Arkona

Cape Arkona (German: Kap Arkona), also spelled Arcona, is a 45-metre (150-foot) high cape on the island of Rügen in Mecklenburg-Vorpommern, Germany. It forms the tip of the Wittow peninsula, just a few kilometres north of the Jasmund National Park. The protected landscape of Cape Arkona, together with the fishing village of Vitt, belongs to the municipality of Putgarten and is one of the most popular tourist destinations on Rügen, receiving about 800,000 visitors annually.

On the cape there are two lighthouses, a navigation tower, two military bunker complexes, the Slavic temple fortress of Jaromarsburg and several tourist buildings (restaurants, pubs and souvenir shops).

Because of its geology and the weathering that occurs here, there are frequent coastal collapses, especially in winter.

Cape Arkona is often referred to as "the northernmost point of Rügen", which is not true. Approximately one kilometre to the north-west, there is a point on the steep coast, known as the Gellort, which is a little further north. Directly at the foot of the Gellort is a 165-ton glacial erratic boulder known as the Siebenschneiderstein (Low German: Söbenschniedersteen). The cape offers a view of the island, both from land or sea.

== Lighthouses and navigation tower ==
The smaller of the two lighthouses was built of brick in 1826/27 based on plans by Karl Friedrich Schinkel and taken into service in 1828. It is 19.3 metres high and has a focal height of 60 m above sea level (NN). The rooms of the three-storey tower are used as operating and storage rooms. It is also called the Schinkelturm ("Schinkel Tower"). On 31 March 1905 it was taken out of service. It is the second oldest lighthouse on the German Baltic Sea coast after the Travemünde Lighthouse.

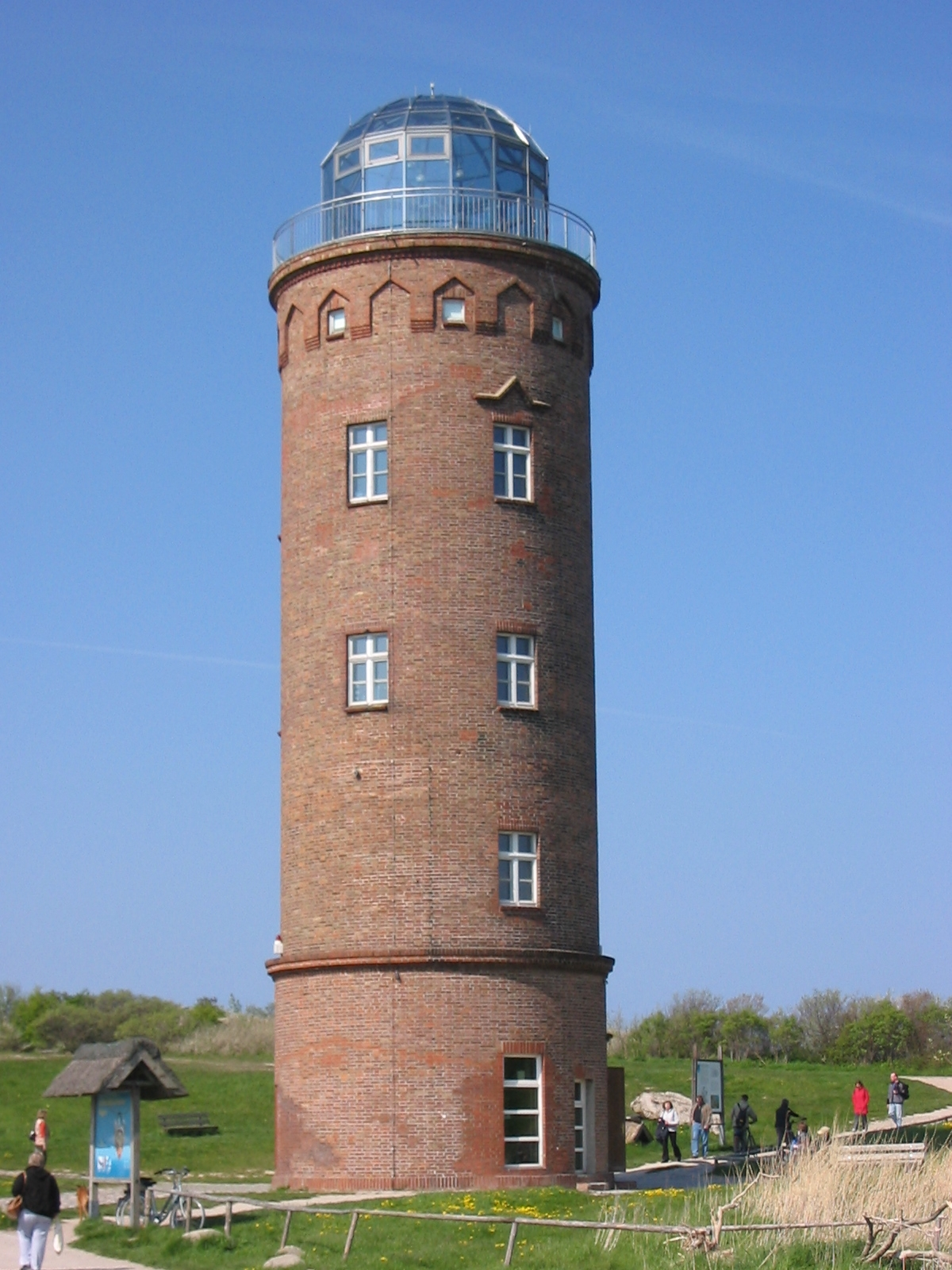
Marine navigation tower (Peilturm)

The largest tower was built in 1901/02 right next to the old tower and entered service on 1 April 1905. It is 35 metres high and has a focal height of 75 m above NN. It is made of brick and stands on an octagonal granite base. For 90 years its light source was two arc lamps, but they were replaced in 1995 by a metal-halide lamp. This, combined with the rotating triple optics, emits 3 flashes every 17 seconds.

The old naval navigation tower (German: Peilturm) was built in 1927 of brick and acted as a marine navigation beacon. From 1911 to 1925, attempts were made - which were ground-breaking for that time - to improve navigation for the Sassnitz–Trelleborg railway ferry, established in 1909, using the emission of radio waves. The foundations of the associated radio operating facility inside the ramparts have survived to this day. The technical facilities of the navigation tower were destroyed, however, in 1945

All three towers were renovated in the early 1990s and are open to visitors. In the old lighthouse, there is now a museum and a branch of the registry office. Marriages may be commemorated here on a small plaque in the ground in front of the tower. The navigation tower is used as an art museum and studio. On each tower there is a viewing platform from which there are unobstructed views of Rügen and especially the peninsula of Wittow. In clear weather you can even see as far as the Danish island of Møn.

== Jaromarsburg ==
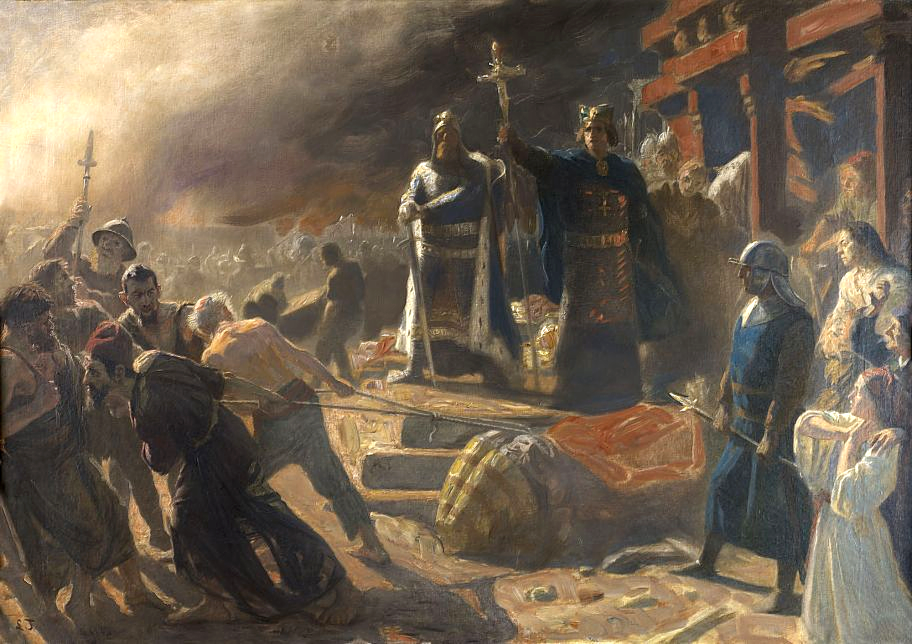
Bishop Absalon topples the god Svantevit at Arkona in 1169

From the 9th to the 12th centuries, the Jaromarsburg was a cult site for the Rani, a Slavic tribe, which was dedicated to their god Svantevit. Located at the tip of the cape, it was protected on three sides by cliffs and from the land side by a 25-metre-high burgwall. The temple located within the ramparts grew in importance as a religious centre for the Slavs of Mecklenburg after the destruction of Rethra in 1068. In 1168, the Danish king Valdemar I conquered Rügen which then became Christian. Churches were established and the castle and its temple destroyed.

At the tip of Arkona in recent centuries, the cliffs have repeatedly collapsed into the sea, with the result that only the ramparts of the Jaromarsburg are still visible today.

== Steps to the beach: Königstreppe and Veilchentreppe ==
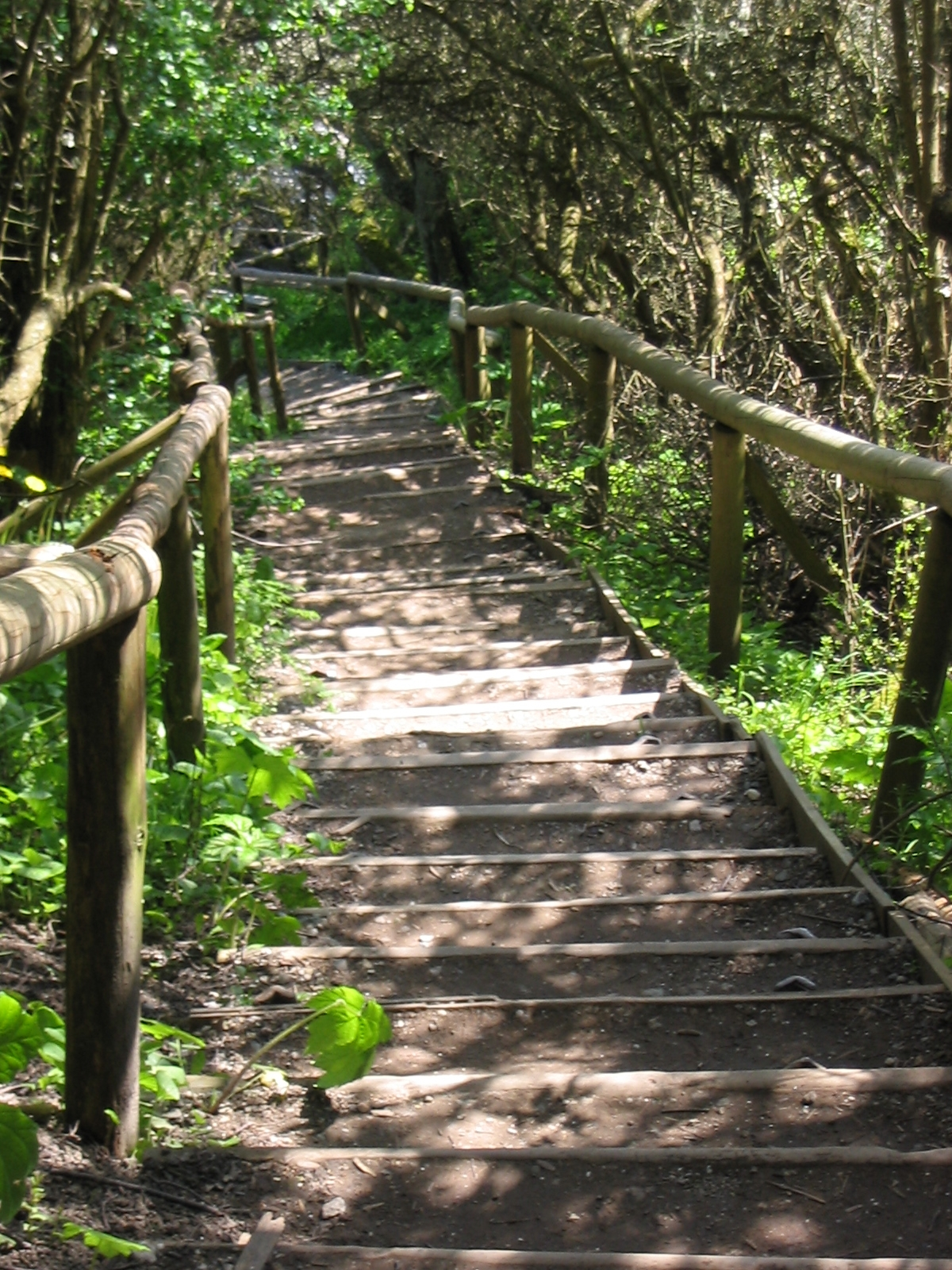
The Veilchentreppe steps

Several metres west of Cape Arkona is the Königstreppe ("King's Staircase"), whose 230 steps climb up the 42-metre-high cliff 230. The Swedish king, Frederick I – Rügen then belonged to Sweden – had a daymark erected near the present-day steps during the Russo-Swedish War (1741–1743) to warn the population. Hence the spot was known as the Königssteig or "King's Climb".

In 1833, for the arrival of the steamboat Hercules during its Imperial Russian chronometer expedition, the Prussian king, Frederick William III - Rügen was now Prussian - had a landing stage and flight of steps built. From this point in 1865, the first telegraph cable was laid under the Baltic Sea to Sweden. With the rise of the island's coastal resorts, tourism at Cape Arkona grew. Many travelers came by excursion boats that moored at the pier at the foot of the steps. The landing stage was, however, completely destroyed by the storm flood of 1953. The new Königstreppe steps were completed in 1995 at the same historic spot, taking a year to build.

South of the remnants of the ramparts at Jaromarsburg are the Veilchentreppe ("Violet Staircase"), a descent to the beach that runs from Arkona to Vitt. The name comes from the violets that grow around the staircase in spring.

== Bunkers ==
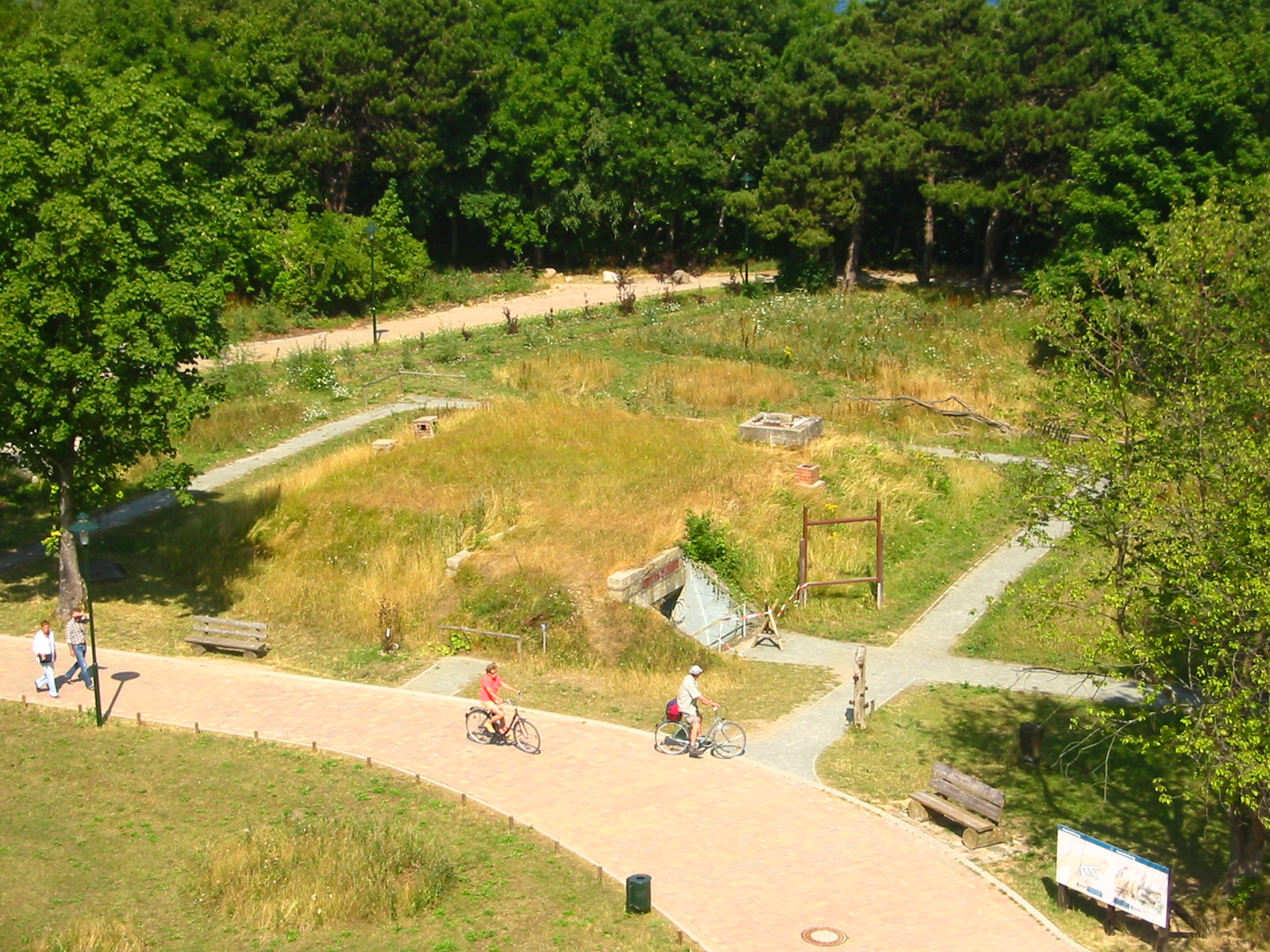
View of the Wehrmacht bunker of Schinkelturm

There are two bunkers in the immediate neighbourhood of the two lighthouses. The smaller, older bunker dates from Wehrmacht times and, in GDR days, housed an outpost of the 6th (Coastal) Border Brigade. It is generally called the Arkona Bunker.

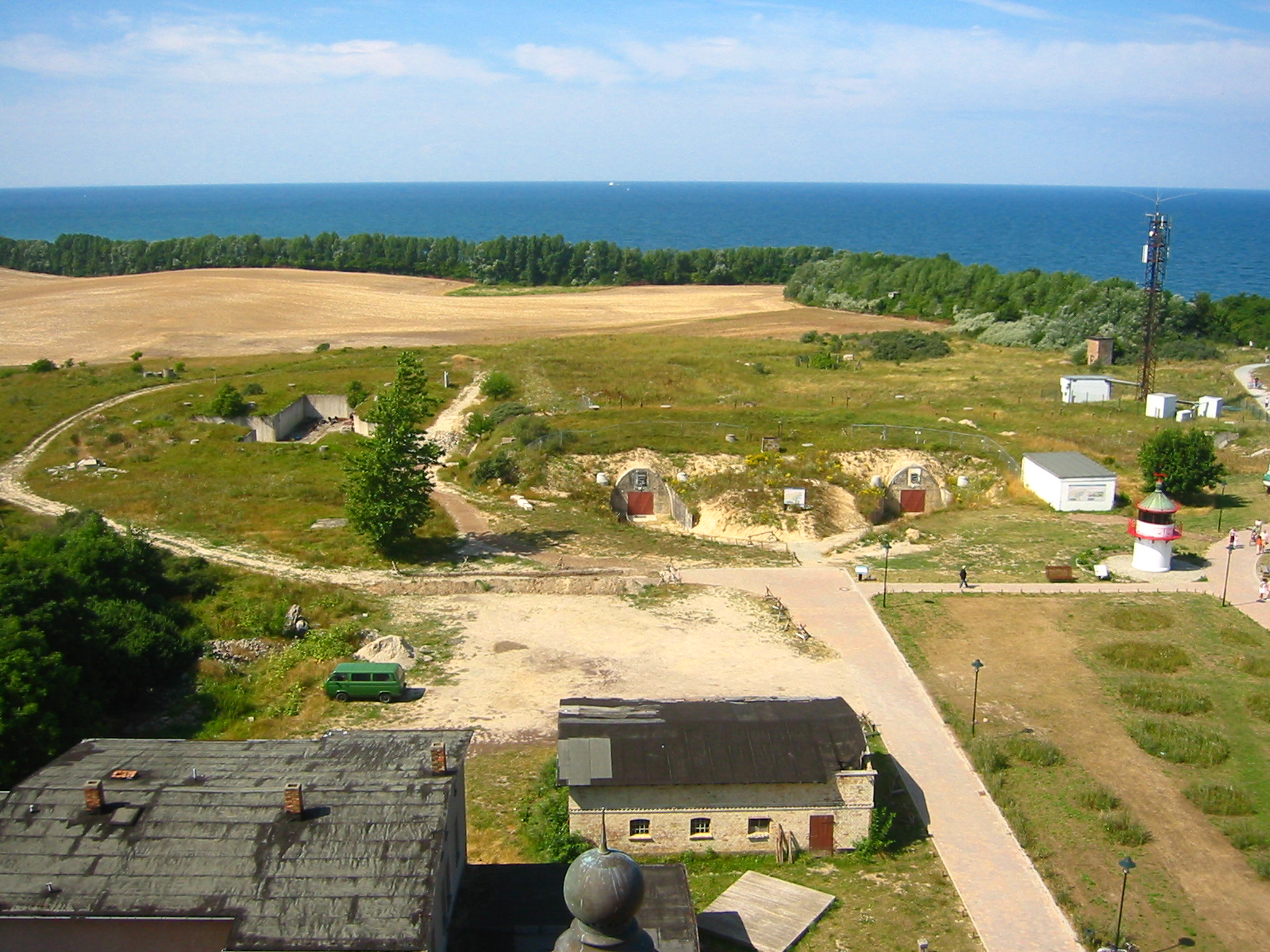
View of the NVA bunker from the new lighthouse

The larger, newer bunker was built from 1979 to 1986 and acted as a command post for the Sixth Flotilla, stationed on Bug, and the Baltic Fleet (VOF). Starting from a main central tunnel with two entrances, there are several autonomous individual bunkers with a total area of 2,000 square metres. They comprise three large bunkers (type FB-75) and nine small ones (type FB-3), made of prefabricated concrete elements (FB = prefabricated bunker). The FB-75 type bunker had an intermediate floor level, where the sleeping areas were located, and an emergency exit. Each individual shelter has a main corridor and two airlocks. Over the top is a 3-to-5-metre-high (9.8 to 16.4 ft) earth covering, from which protrude dozens of ventilation tubes.

In 1985, on the 30th anniversary of the National People's Army (NVA), an aerial photograph of Cape Arkona, with the bunker complex in the background, was publicised in the picture book Soldaten des Volkes ("Soldiers of the People"). The bunkers were uncamouflaged. How the photograph was allowed to appear in this book is not clear, but it was withdrawn from circulation again just three days after its publication. A later edition of the illustrated book was published with the aerial image omitted. Today, the original picture book is a collector's piece.

From 1986, 50–70 soldiers of the Volksmarine ("People's Navy") were on duty here for two to three days, three to four times a year, as part of naval exercises. The standard complement was four men. On 3 October 1990, the day of German reunification, the site was closed.

The bunkers were purchased and successively renovated by the municipality of Putgarten. The Arkona Bunker now houses an art gallery and the NVA Bunker an exhibition of GDR fittings and equipment as well as a series of photographs on the Volksmarine.

== Access ==
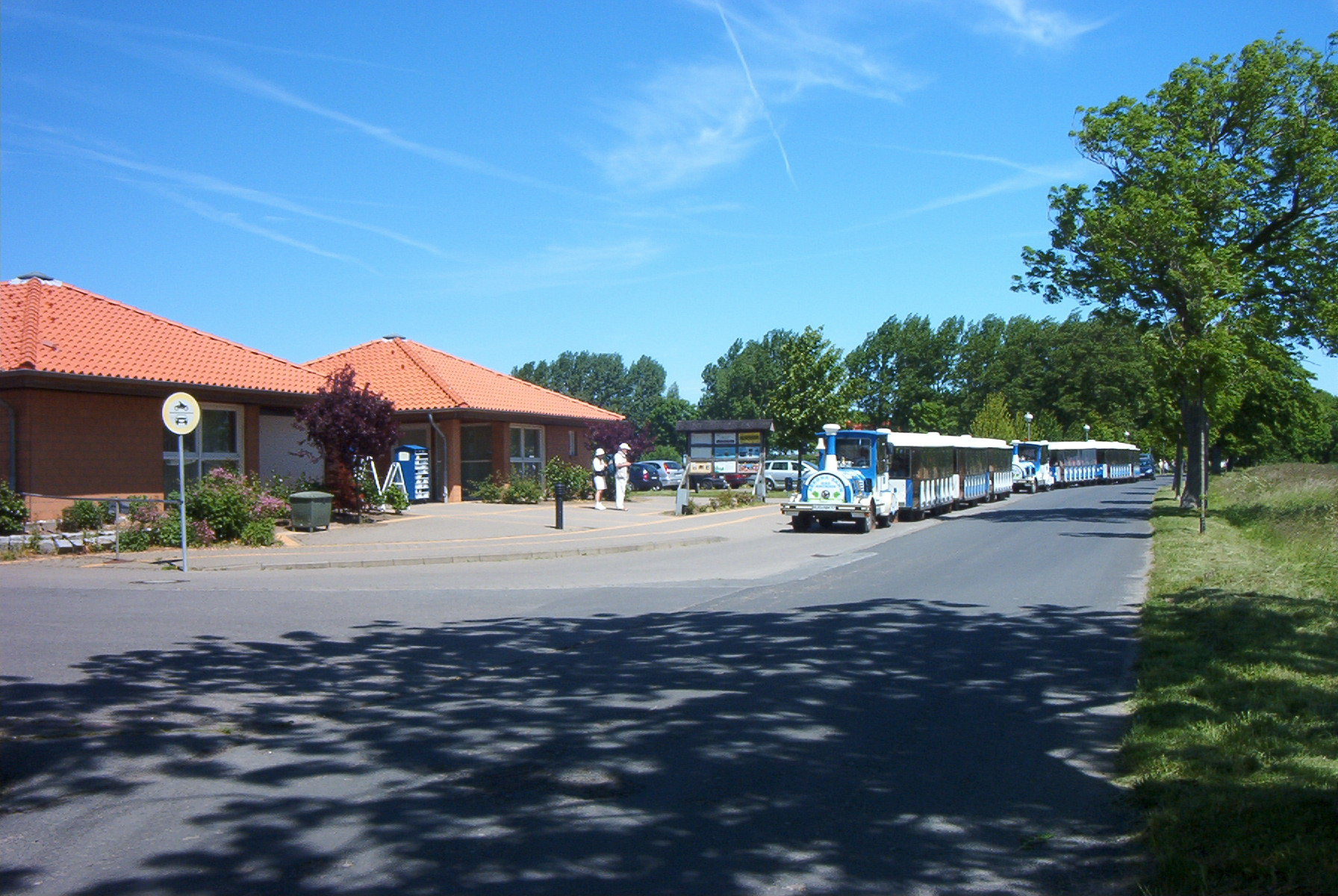
The Arkona road train in Putgarten

Just outside Putgarten is a large car park where all visitors to the cape have to park their cars or tour buses. From there the cape may be accessed on foot (1.8 km), by horse and carriage or on the Cape Arkona road train (Kap-Arkona-Bahn). The various sights may also be visited by bicycle.

Since 1993 the Cape Arkona Train has provided services from Putgarten to Cape Arkona and the fishing village of Vitt. It does not run on rails as the name suggests, but is a road train that runs on wheels on normal roads. The train is hauled by a tractor designed to look like a steam locomotive but since 1996 has actually been powered by a more environmentally-friendly gas engine.

Ships operated by the Reederei Ostsee-Tour also run daily from Binz and Sassnitz to Cape Arkona.

== Climate ==
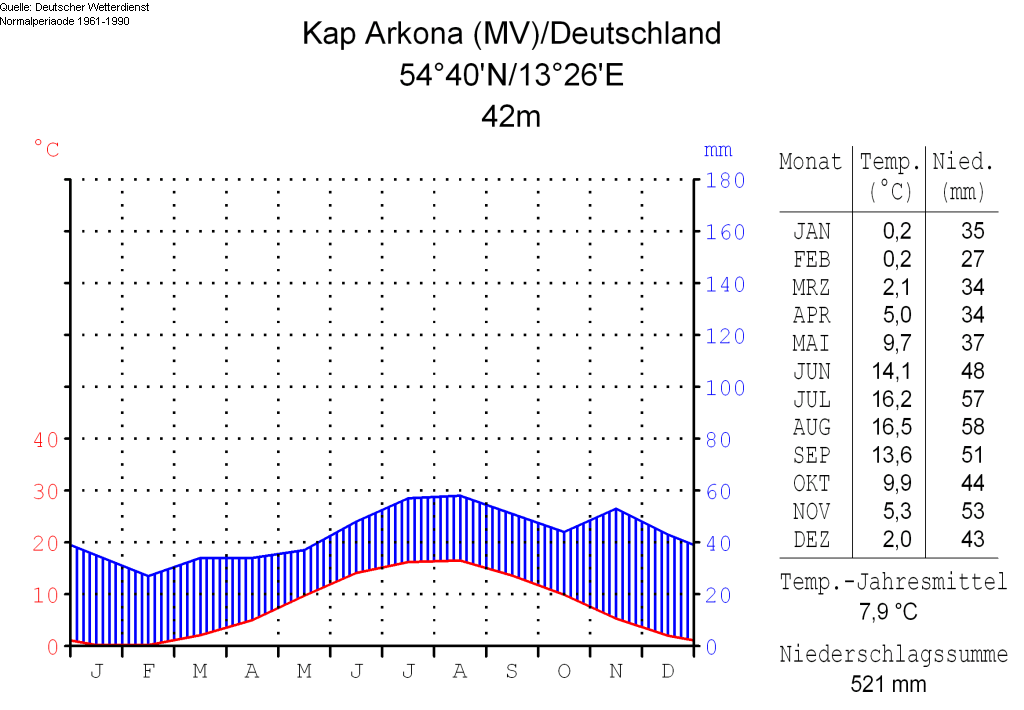
Climatic diagram

The climate at Cape Arkona is typical of the North Vorpommern coast. The average annual temperature is 8.9 °C (48.0 °F). Precipitation amounts to 547.8 mm (21.57 in) per year. Because of its proximity to the sea, its humidity is very high.

The Cape Arkona weather station has recorded the following extreme values:

- Highest Temperature 33.5 °C (92.3 °F) on 30 June 2019.
- Warmest Minimum 22.1 °C (71.8 °F) on 10 July 2010.
- Coldest Maximum −11.0 °C (12.2 °F) on 15 February 1956.
- Lowest Temperature −18.9 °C (−2.0 °F) on 1 February 1954.
- Highest Daily Precipitation 83.0 mm (3.27 in) on 15 September 1955.
- Wettest Month 234.6 mm (9.24 in) in August 2010.
- Wettest Year 830.5 mm (32.70 in) in 1960.
- Driest Year 331.3 mm (13.04 in) in 1971.
- Earliest Snowfall: 2 November 1966.
- Latest Snowfall: 23 April 1988.
- Longest annual sunshine: 2,187.4 hours in 2018.
- Shortest annual sunshine: 1,591.7 hours in 1987.

Climate data for Cape Arkona (1991−2020 normals, extremes 1947–present)
Month	Jan	Feb	Mar	Apr	May	Jun	Jul	Aug	Sep	Oct	Nov	Dec	Year
Record high °C (°F)	13.7 (56.7)	16.3 (61.3)	18.4 (65.1)	25.5 (77.9)	27.7 (81.9)	33.5 (92.3)	30.3 (86.5)	32.2 (90.0)	28.9 (84.0)	25.0 (77.0)	17.9 (64.2)	13.1 (55.6)	33.5 (92.3)
Mean maximum °C (°F)	8.2 (46.8)	8.6 (47.5)	12.7 (54.9)	17.7 (63.9)	21.0 (69.8)	24.2 (75.6)	25.8 (78.4)	26.4 (79.5)	22.3 (72.1)	17.4 (63.3)	12.3 (54.1)	9.1 (48.4)	28.0 (82.4)
Mean daily maximum °C (°F)	3.2 (37.8)	3.3 (37.9)	5.6 (42.1)	9.5 (49.1)	13.7 (56.7)	17.7 (63.9)	20.4 (68.7)	20.7 (69.3)	17.1 (62.8)	12.3 (54.1)	7.6 (45.7)	4.5 (40.1)	11.3 (52.3)
Daily mean °C (°F)	1.5 (34.7)	1.6 (34.9)	3.3 (37.9)	6.6 (43.9)	10.8 (51.4)	14.6 (58.3)	17.4 (63.3)	17.8 (64.0)	14.7 (58.5)	10.2 (50.4)	5.9 (42.6)	2.8 (37.0)	8.9 (48.0)
Mean daily minimum °C (°F)	−0.3 (31.5)	−0.2 (31.6)	1.2 (34.2)	4.3 (39.7)	8.2 (46.8)	12.0 (53.6)	14.8 (58.6)	15.2 (59.4)	12.4 (54.3)	8.2 (46.8)	4.1 (39.4)	1.0 (33.8)	6.7 (44.1)
Mean minimum °C (°F)	−6.3 (20.7)	−5.2 (22.6)	−2.9 (26.8)	0.1 (32.2)	4.3 (39.7)	8.6 (47.5)	11.3 (52.3)	11.3 (52.3)	8.7 (47.7)	3.5 (38.3)	−1.0 (30.2)	−5.1 (22.8)	−8.3 (17.1)
Record low °C (°F)	−17.0 (1.4)	−18.9 (−2.0)	−16.9 (1.6)	−2.8 (27.0)	−0.7 (30.7)	3.3 (37.9)	7.8 (46.0)	7.8 (46.0)	3.4 (38.1)	−1.3 (29.7)	−8.7 (16.3)	−13.7 (7.3)	−18.9 (−2.0)
Average precipitation mm (inches)	39.9 (1.57)	29.2 (1.15)	30.4 (1.20)	28.3 (1.11)	41.5 (1.63)	56.9 (2.24)	56.6 (2.23)	67.8 (2.67)	52.9 (2.08)	53.8 (2.12)	45.6 (1.80)	44.9 (1.77)	547.8 (21.57)
Average extreme snow depth cm (inches)	4.9 (1.9)	6.3 (2.5)	3.4 (1.3)	0.5 (0.2)	0 (0)	0 (0)	0 (0)	0 (0)	0 (0)	0 (0)	0.7 (0.3)	3.6 (1.4)	10.1 (4.0)
Average precipitation days (≥ 0.1 mm)	16.3	14.7	12.9	10.3	11.2	12.2	12.3	13.5	13.2	15.7	16.2	17.8	166.4
Average snowy days (≥ 1.0 cm)	6.4	7.6	3.9	0.2	0	0	0	0	0	0	0.6	3.6	22.9
Average relative humidity (%)	87.4	86.1	83.9	81.2	80.5	80.0	79.8	79.7	80.3	82.8	86.7	88.0	83.0
Mean monthly sunshine hours	48.4	69.0	143.6	225.8	277.3	274.5	277.3	247.4	179.0	115.3	52.8	37.3	1,948.4
Source 1: NOAA
Source 2: Deutscher Wetterdienst

== Accident ==
On 26 December 2011, there was a major rock slide at Cape Arkona, which buried a ten-year-old girl and seriously injured her mother. A weeklong search for the child was given up on 8 January 2012 and it was not until 31 January 2012 that the child's body was found at the foot of the cliff.

== Maritime ==
=== Ships ===
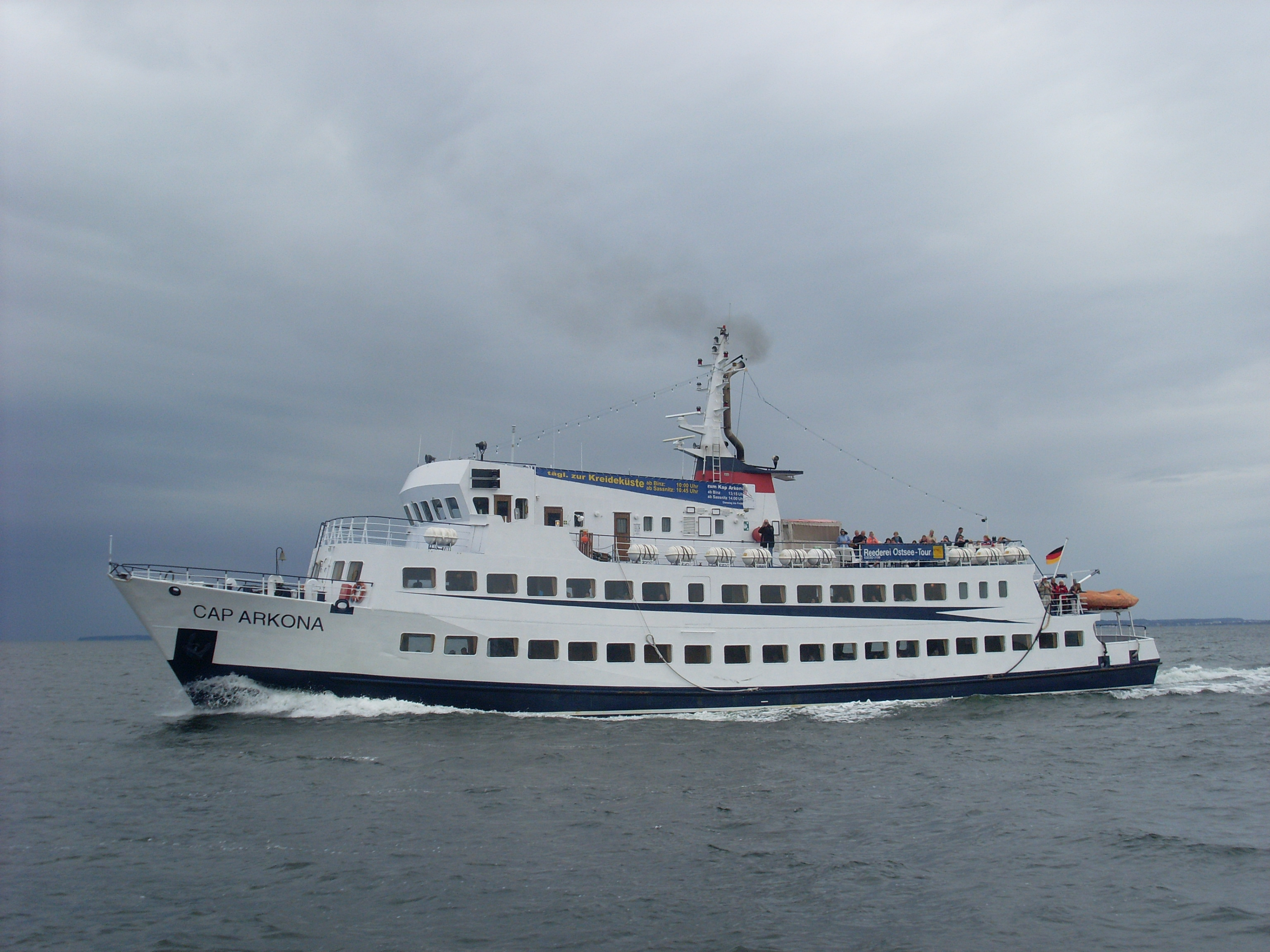
Ship named Cap Arkona

The following ships have been named after Cape Arkona:

- The Prussian steam frigate Arcona, launched in 1858, the lead ship of the Arcona-class frigates
- The German screw corvette Arcona, launched in 1885
- The German light cruiser Arcona, launched in 1902
- The German luxury ocean liner, SS Cap Arcona, launched in 1927.
- The cargo ship, Kap Arkona, owned by Deutsche Seereederei (DSR).
- The rescue cruiser, Arkona, of the German Maritime Search and Rescue Service.

=== Other ===
An offshore wind farm called Arkona is in development 35 km north-east of the point, designed with 60 Siemens Wind Power 6 MW gearless turbines.

== Gallery ==
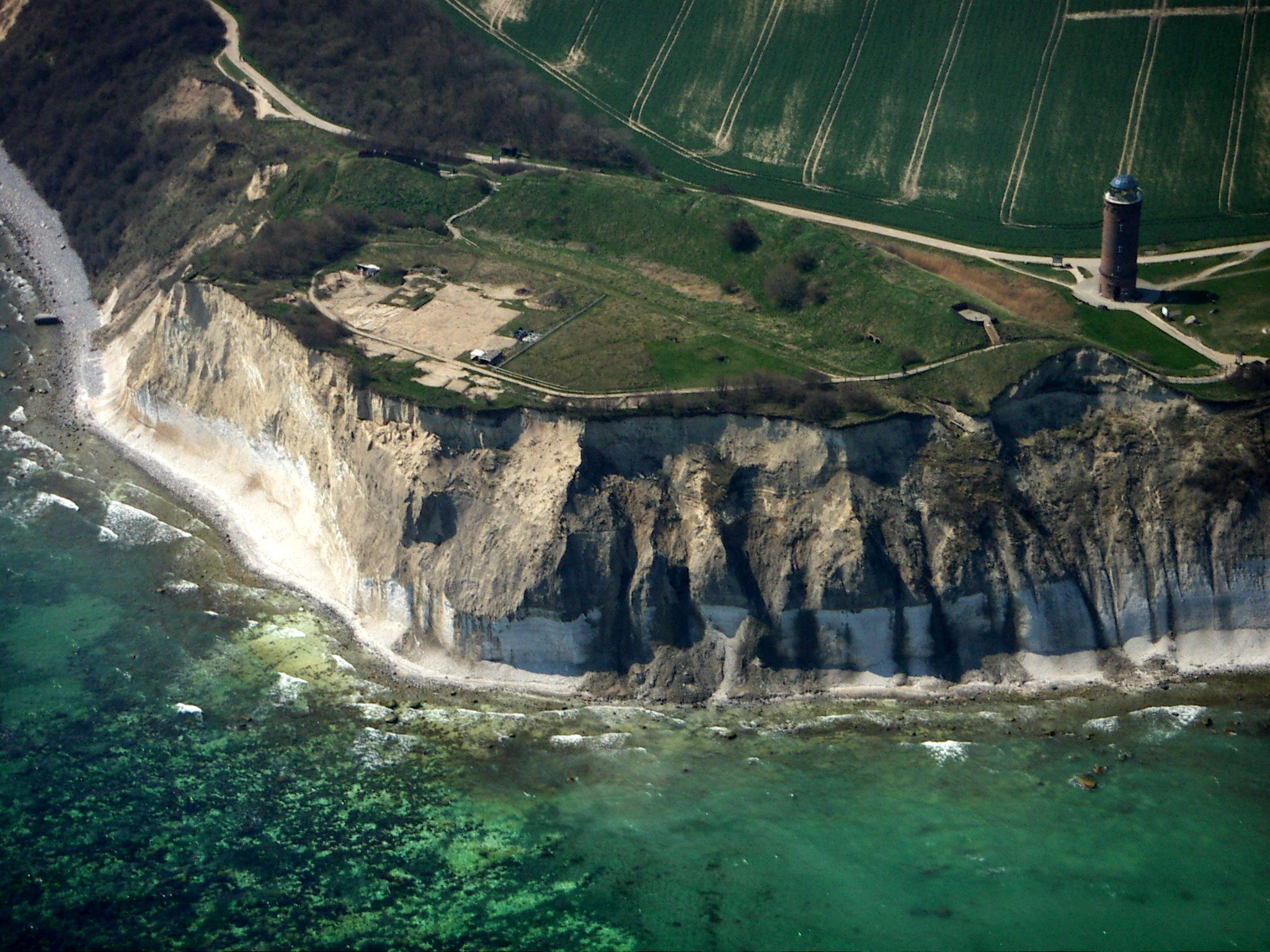
Cape Arkona from the air

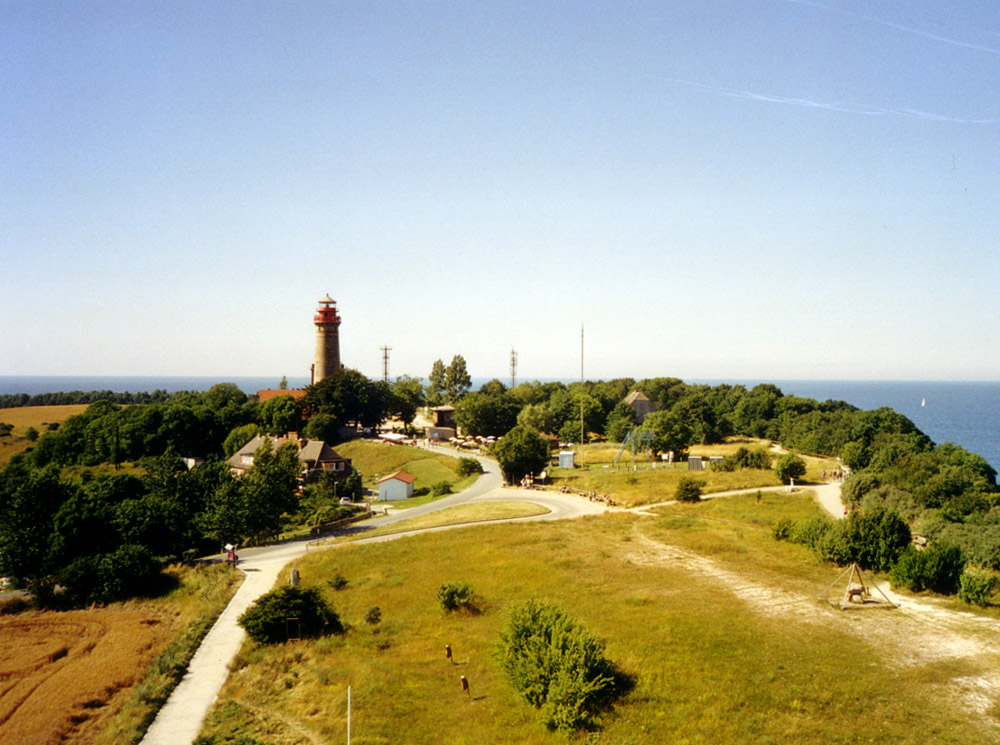
View from the navigation tower

== See also ==
- Pomerania during the Early Middle Ages
- Pomerania during the Late Middle Ages
- Conversion of Pomerania
- Rugii (Germanic Tribe)
- Rani (Slavic tribe)
- Principality of Rügen

== Literature ==
- Stefan Best: Geheime Bunkeranlagen der DDR, Motorbuchverlag, Stuttgart, ISBN 3-613-02332-6
- Peter Feist: Der Burgwall am Kap Arkona, Kai Homilius Verlag, Berlin, 1995, ISBN 3-931121-00-3
