= Sagard =

- Municipality
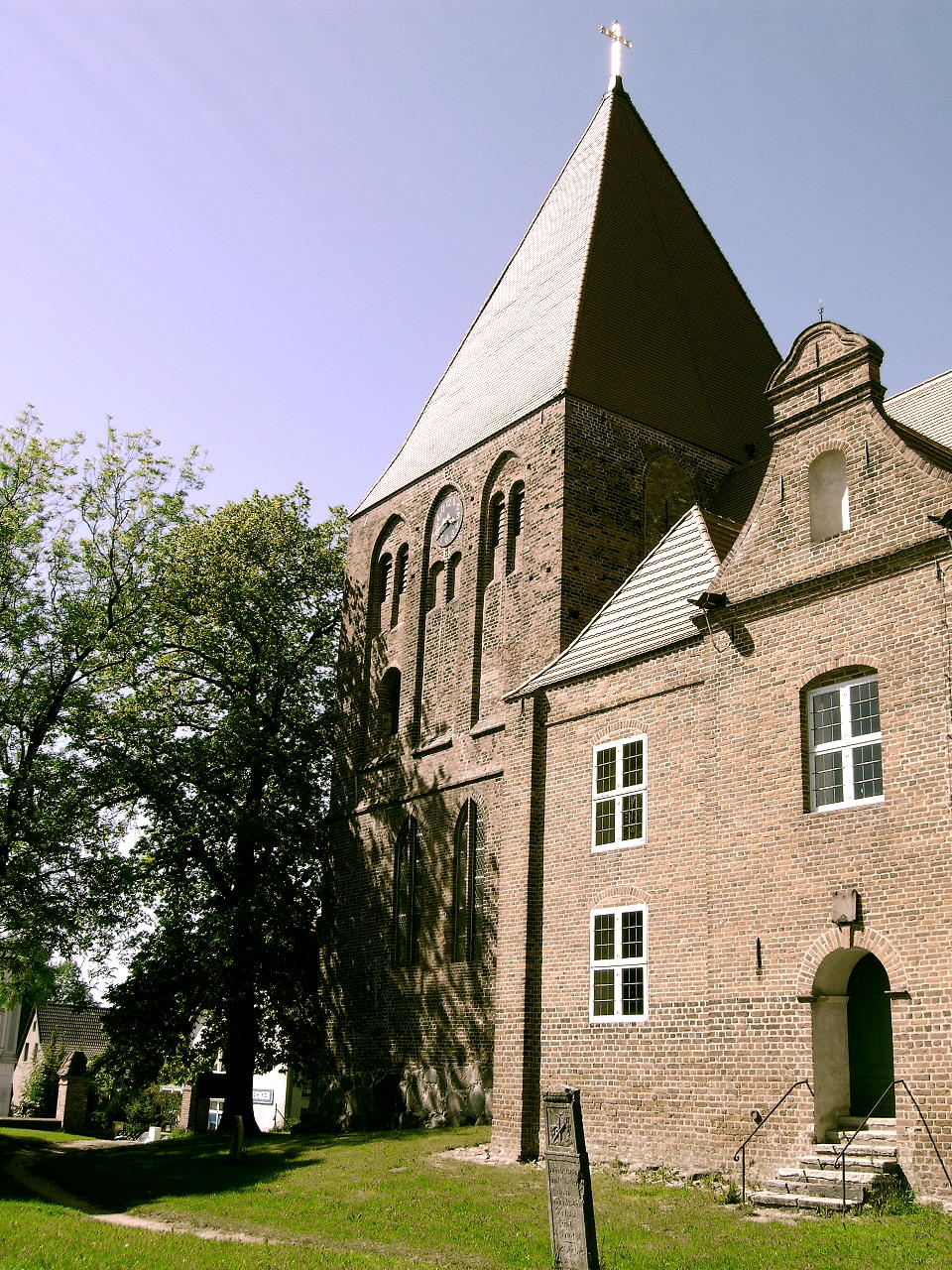
- St. Michaelis church of Sagard

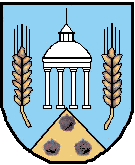
- Coat of arms

- Location of Sagard within Vorpommern-Rügen district
- Interactive map of Sagard
- Location within Germany Location within Mecklenburg-Vorpommern
- Coordinates: 54°31′N 13°33′E
- Country: Germany
- State: Mecklenburg-Vorpommern
- District: Vorpommern-Rügen
- Municipal assoc.: Nord-Rügen

Government
  - Mayor (2019–24): Sandro Wenzel

Area
  - Total: 27.93 km^{2} (10.78 sq mi)
- Elevation: 15 m (49 ft)

Population (2025-12-31)
  - Total: 2,381
  - Density: 85.25/km^{2} (220.8/sq mi)
- Time zone: UTC+01:00 (CET)
  - Summer (DST): UTC+02:00 (CEST)
- Postal codes: 18551
- Dialling codes: 038302
- Vehicle registration: RÜG
- Website: www.amt-nord-ruegen.de

Sagard is a municipality in the Vorpommern-Rügen district, in Mecklenburg-Vorpommern, Germany.

== History ==
Sagard is first mentioned in 1250 as Zagard. The name of the municipality of Sagard comes from the Slavic and means something like stockade or fortified settlement. This points to a Slavic burgwall from the 12th Century that was formerly sited here, but has since been levelled.

Around 1750, there were the beginnings of a health resort. In 1795, the pastor, Heinrich Christoph von Willich, and his brother, the country doctor, Dr. Moritz von Willich, opened a Spring, Bathing and Leisure Institute. The bathing facility lasted until about 1830. Today the Historic Brunnenaue Park (Historische Parkanlage Brunnenaue) recalls the former idyllic spa park with its promenades, fountains and bath houses.
