= Altenkirchen, Rügen =

Altenkirchen
- Municipality
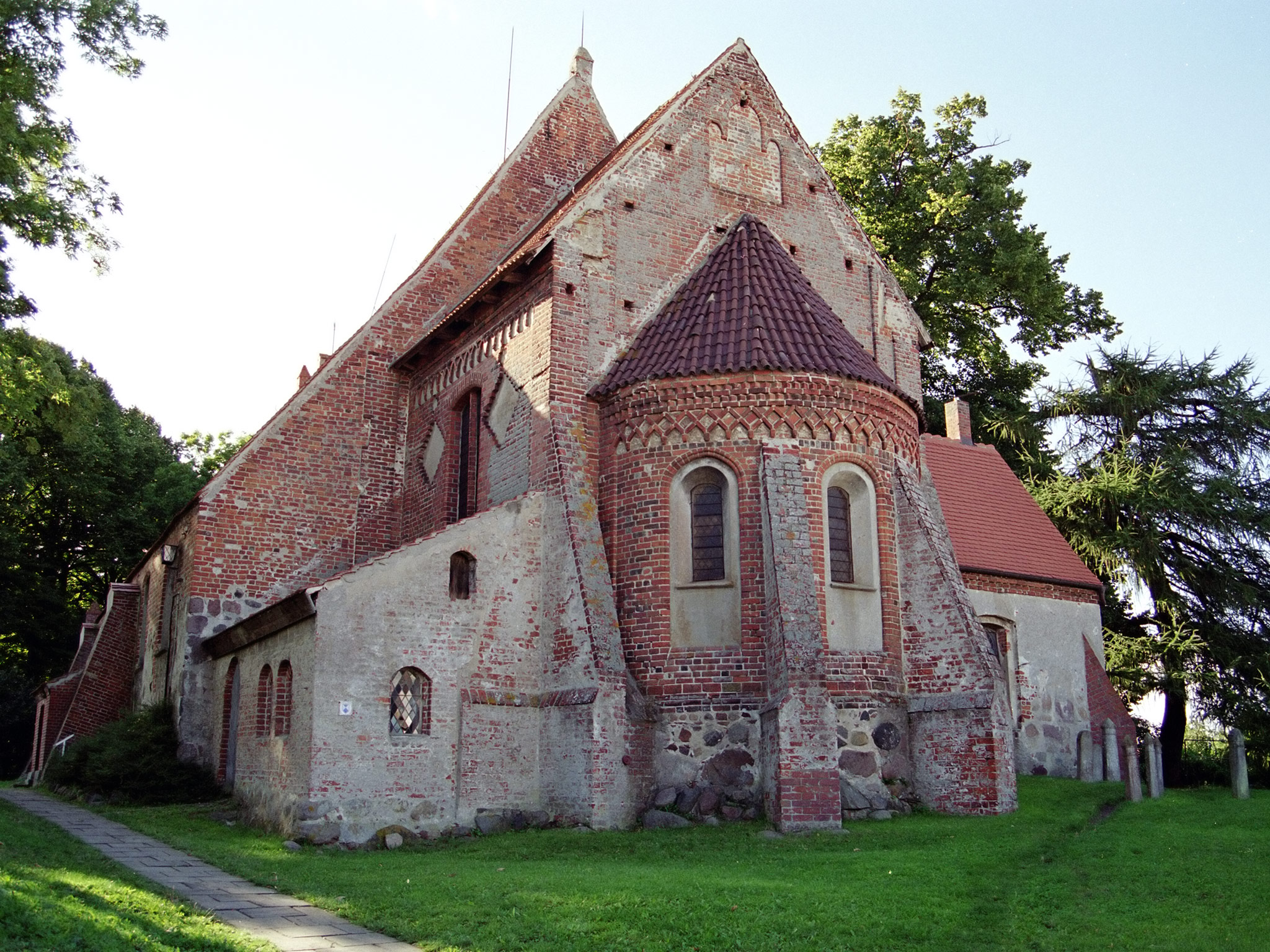
- Parish church of Altenkirchen

- Location of Altenkirchen within Vorpommern-Rügen district
- Interactive map of Altenkirchen
- Location within Germany Location within Mecklenburg-Vorpommern
- Coordinates: 54°38′10″N 13°20′38″E
- Country: Germany
- State: Mecklenburg-Vorpommern
- District: Vorpommern-Rügen
- Municipal assoc.: Nord-Rügen

Government
  - Mayor: Jutta Sill

Area
  - Total: 22.66 km^{2} (8.75 sq mi)
- Elevation: 20 m (66 ft)

Population (2025-12-31)
  - Total: 866
  - Density: 38.2/km^{2} (99.0/sq mi)
- Time zone: UTC+01:00 (CET)
  - Summer (DST): UTC+02:00 (CEST)
- Postal codes: 18556
- Dialling codes: 038391
- Vehicle registration: RÜG

Altenkirchen (German pronunciation: [ˌaltn̩ˈkɪʁçn̩]) is a municipality in the north of the island of Rügen on the Baltic Sea coast of Germany. It is in the Vorpommern-Rügen district, in the federal state of Mecklenburg-Vorpommern.

It is the only land access to its eastern neighbour Putgarten, which includes Kap Arkona, the northernmost point of the island.

It includes the localities of Drewoldke, Gudderitz, Lanckensburg, Mattchow, Schwarbe, Presenske, Wollin and Zühlitz.

Its name derives from its famous parish church, whose construction is believed to have commenced around 1185.
