= West Lechitic dialects =

Group of extinct Slavic dialects

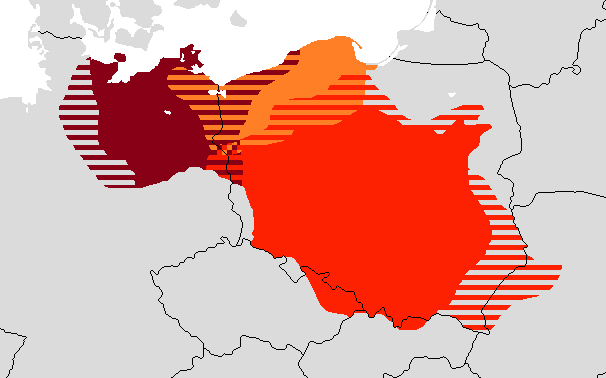
In brown, regions where Lechitic languages may have been spoken in the 9th and 10th centuries.

The West Lechitic dialects (or West Lekhitic dialects) are a group of extinct Lechitic dialects, used by the Slavic peoples of Pomerania, Margraviate of Brandenburg, Mecklenburg and the lands on the lower and middle Elbe. At the same time, the dialects of Central Pomerania and Gdańsk Pomerania are usually considered transitional between West Lechitic and East Lechitic (i.e. all traditional dialects of the Polish language except Kashubian) and are called the Middle Lechitic dialect group.

== Phonetic features ==
Among the distinctive phonetic features of the West Lechitic area were:

- The almost complete absence of the metathesis TorT into TroT (like in the Polish area), cf. Polabian korvo, stornă, morz < Proto-Slavic *korva, *storna, *morzъ; instead generally gave TarT, cf. Garditz < PS *Gordьcь
- The fusion of TolT and TelT into a single TolT, which after metathesis gave TlåT or TloT, cf. Polabian slåmă, mlåkă < PS *solma, *melka. There were also toponyms without a metathesis, e.g. Moltow, Priwalk
- The preservation of the palatalized consonants before the Proto-Slavic syllable-forming *ŕ (*ьr) depalatalized as a result of Lechitic apophony, cf, Polabian ai̯ḿortă, tjordă, źornü vs. Polish twardy, dial. umarty, Old Polish zarno
- The fusion of the hard and soft syllable-forming *l̥ and *ĺ̥ (*ъl and *ьl) into a single oł, which in Polabian is represented by åu̯, e.g. påu̯nă, våu̯k, dåu̯ďĕ or u, e.g. vuk, cf. Polish pełny, wilk, długi.
- The diphthongization of Proto-Slavic *y, originally probably only in position after labial consonants, as evidenced by toponyms such as Boiceneburg, Boisterfelde, Primoysle, cf. Polish Byczyna, Bystre, Przemyśl.
- The merger of the anlauts *o- and *vo-, which connects the West Lechitic area with Greater Poland, Lusatia and most of the area of Bohemia proper and West Moravia, cf. Polabian vådă, vićă, Upper Sorbian woda, wowca, Greater Poland u̯oda, u̯ofca, Czech dial. voda, vofce and Polish woda, owca.

== Division ==
West Lechitic dialects include:

- West Pomeranian dialect
- Mecklenburgian subdialects: as for the division of Mecklenburgian dialects into groups, it is uncertain. Maria Jeżowa argues that they did not differ in any significant way, while the phonetic isoglosses, plotted by Tadeusz Milewski, are not supported by toponomastic material. Tadeusz Lehr-Spławiński, using these isoglosses, proposed the following division:
  - Rani dialect
    - northwestern Rani subdialects
    - southeastern Rani subdialects
  - Veleti dialect
  - Obotrite dialect
- Drevani dialect – Polabian language
- Marcho-Magdeburgian dialect

== Bibliography ==
- Stieber, Zdzisław (1965). Zarys dialektologii języków zachodniosłowiańskich (in Polish). Warszawa: PWN.
- Lehr-Spławiński, Tadeusz (1934). O narzeczach Słowian nadbałtyckich (in Polish). Toruń.
- Jeżowa, Maria (1961). Dawne słowiańskie dialekty meklemburgii w świetle nazw miejscowych i osobowych (in Polish). Vol. I. Fonetyka. Zakład Narodowy imienia Ossolińskich.
- Dajna, Karol (1993). Dialekty polskie (in Polish). Wrocław: Zakład Narodowy im. Ossolińskich.
- Konopka, Marek (2008). Roelcke, Thorsten (ed.). Variationstypologie / Variation Typology: Ein sprachtypologisches Handbuch der europäischen Sprachen in Geschichte und Gegenwart / A Typological Handbook of European Languages. Walter de Gruyter. ISBN 978-3110202021.
- Papierkowski, Stanisław (1930). "Szczątki języka słowiańskich mieszkańców Starej Marchji i okolic Magdeburga". Slavia Occidentalis (in Polish). IX: 73–124.
