= Rani dialect =

Medieval Slavic dialect spoken by the Rani tribe

Rani
- Lechito-Rani
- Native to: Germany
- Region: Rügen
- Ethnicity: Rani
- Extinct: 1404
- Language family: Indo-European: Balto-Slavic; Slavic; West Slavic; Lechitic; West Lechitic; Mecklenburgian; Rani

Language codes
- ISO 639-3: –
- Map of Rügen from 1608 by Eilhardus Lubinus

The Rani dialect or Lechito-Rani supradialect is an extinct Slavic Lechitic dialect used by the Rani tribe – the medieval Slavic inhabitants of the island of Rügen (in Rani dialect: Rȯjana, Rāna) and its opposite coast. This dialect, because of its closer affinity to the Drevani language than to the Pomeranian area, should be classified as a West Lechitic dialect.

The dialects of Rügen have left no written monuments, so the main source of knowledge about them is the toponyms and personal names of Slavic origin recorded in medieval chronicles.

== Features ==
=== Development of vowels and sonants ===
The development of Proto-Slavic nasals coincided with that in other Lechitic dialects - the PS *ǫ gave a regular ą̊, e.g. Dansne, Gansilitze, Damerowe, Wanghelin < PS *Dǫsno, *Gǫslicě, *Dǫbrovy, *Ǫglinъ, whereas in the case of PS *ę Lechitic apophony happened and before the hard dental consonants it gave 'ą̊, e.g. Boranta, Swantewostroe, Zvantegurt < PS *Boręta, *Svętъ Ostrovъ, *Svętъ Gordъ, while in the other positions narrow ę̇, e.g. Burrentin, Gnewentin, Uincymir < PS *Borętinъ, *Gněvętinъ, *Vęťemirъ.

Lechitic apophony also shows the development of *ě – before the hard dental consonants it gave *a, e.g. Lascouiz, Peask, Stralowe < PS *Lěsъkovica, *Pěsъkъ, *Strělovo, while in other positions e, e.g. Gnewentin, Pasceke, Tessemar < PS *Gněvętinъ, *Pasěka, *Těšimirъ.

Proto-Slavic *e before originally palatalized consonants narrows to ė, transcribed alternately by ⟨e⟩, ⟨i⟩ and ⟨y⟩, e.g. Bizdede, Kaminise, Mellnitz < PS *Bezdědьje, *Kamenišče, *Melьnica, while in other positions it gives an e, e.g. Brese, Gribenow, Jesere < PS *Berza, *Grebenovъ, *Jezero. The narrowing of *e to ė or i before originally palatal consonants ties the Rani dialect to the Drevani area. No Lechitic apophony *e > ’o.

The Proto-Slavic *o probably developed into the narrow ȯ, denoted in writing ⟨o⟩, ⟨u⟩ or ⟨uo⟩, e.g. Burizlaws, Dobrezlauus, Ulznica < PS *Borislavъ, *Dobroslavъ, *Olьšanica. In addition, *o underwent reduction to a reduced vowel of the type ə under certain hard-to-define conditions, e.g. Debermoyzle, Luberadus < PS *Dobromyslъ, *Ľuboradъ. Especially often this reduction occurs in the auslaut, e.g. Bucowe, Belicowe, Jarcuowe < PS *Bukovo, *Bělikovo, *Jarъkovo, although there are also forms without this reduction, such as. Slaweko < PS *Slavъko. The anlaut *o- tends to take on a prosthetic v- (*o- > u̯o- > vo-), e.g. Wastroznae, Wobluzs, Swantewostroe < PS *Ostrožьn-, *Obľuže, *Svętъ Ostrovъ, which connects the Rani dialect to all of Polabie, Pomerania, Lusatia, Greater Poland and Bohemia.

Proto-Slavic *a as a rule gave a, e.g. Babyn, Camenez, Graboue < PS *Babinъ, *Kamenьcь, *Grabovo. However, it developed differently in the *ra- group, where it gave re-, e.g. Redomer, Retim < PS *Radoměrъ, *Radimь next to the rarer ra- such as Radozlaus < PS *Radoslavъ and perhaps in the *ja- group, where the records are ambiguous, since, for example, next to Jerognew there is Jargneu < PS *Jarogněvъ. In addition, in the auslaut *a was reduced, e.g.. Ghore, Lopate, Plachte < PS *gora, *lopata, *plaxъta.

The Proto-Slavic *u gives a constant u, e.g. Bucowe, Lubbin, Zulizlaus < PS *Bukovo, *Ľubinъ, *Sulislavъ, except for the position before the nasal consonants m and n, where it seems to give o, e.g. Peron (next to Pyrun, Perun), Stromineke < PS *Perunъ, *Strumenьky.

The Proto-Slavic *i generally gave i, e.g. Babyn, Bandin, Gardist < PS *Babinъ, *Bǫdinъ, *Gordišče. In the position before *r, however, it must have been raised to e or a, as evidenced by notations like Jaromerus, Moyzlemer, Seracowe < PS *Jaromirъ, *Myslimirъ, *Sirakovo.

The Proto-Slavic *y essentially gave y, e.g. Bitgast, Bykove, Pribislaus < PS *Bydъgoščь, *Bykovo, *Pribyslavъ, with a strong tendency to diphthongize to oi in the position after labial consonants, e.g. Moyslekov, Moyzlemer, Woyzlaus < PS *Myslikovъ, *Myslimirъ, Vyslavъ. In addition, *y was reduced to ə in some positions, such as. Damerowe, Lepelowe < PS *Dǫbrovy, *Lěpylovy.

Yers in weak position disappeared, while in the strong position *ь gave e, e.g. Camenez, Coretz, Kozel < PS *Kamenьcь, *Korьcь, *Kozьlъ, and *ъ most likely gave o, for which there is only one example: Cirkow < PS *Cŕ̥kъvь.

Proto-Slavic group *TorT switches to TarT almost without exceptions, np. Barnim, Charna, Gartz < PS *Bornimъ, *Xorna, *Gordьcь. The *TolT group usually switches to TloT, e.g. Glowe, Glowenitza, Slonitze < PS *Golvy, *Golvьnica, *Solnicě, although there are examples for TolT, e.g. Soldekewitze < PS *Soldъkoviťě. The *TerT group generally gives TreT, sometimes written ⟨TriT⟩ np. Breghe, Bresnitz, Brisanche < PS *Bergy, *Berzьnica, *Beržanъky, exceptional TerT is only the Zerbentin < PS *Žerbętinъ. No examples for *TelT.

The Proto-Slavic *r̥ (*ъr) constantly gives ar, e.g. Carnin, Garnzke < PS *Kr̥ninъ, *Gr̥nьčьky. In the case of *ŕ̥ (*ьr) there was a Lechitic apophony to ar before the hard dental consonants, e.g. Bardeke, Zarnegloue < PS *Bŕ̥dъko, *Čŕ̥na Glova, while in the other positions *ŕ̥ gives er (also noted as ⟨ir⟩), e.g. Cerwitze, Cirkow, Sirkuist < PS *Čŕ̥vicě, *Cŕ̥kъvь, *Cŕ̥kъvišče. Proto-Slavic *l̥ and *ĺ̥ (*ъl and *ьl) merged to give ol, e.g. Dolgemost, Puzdevolk, Stolpzk < PS *Dl̥gъ Mostъ, *Pustivĺ̥kъ, *Stl̥pьskъ.

=== Development of consonants ===
Primary palatal consonants have dyspalatalized, except when followed by back vowels. This palatalization is noted in records such as Borjanta, Liazcha, Pyazcke, Zwinga < PS *Boręta, *Lěska, *Pěsъky, *Svinьja. This links the Rani dialect with the Drevani dialect.

Proto-Slavic *ť and *ď (< *t-j, *k-t; *d-j) gave c and ʒ, respectively, e.g. Swetzenowitz, Blandzawicz < PS *Svěťenoviťь, *Blǫďaviťь, with the latter phoneme tending to transition into z, e.g. Miseres < PS *Meďerěčь.

The Proto-Slavic group *šč has passed into st, e.g. Gardist, Stiaplin < PS *Gordišče, *Ščapъlinъ.

Written monuments lack the distinction of the series s, c, z from š, č, ž, which most likely indicates the mazuration of the Rugian dialect.

== Bibliography ==
- Batowski, Henryk (1927). "Przyczynki do narzecza lechicko-rugijskiego". Slavia Occidentalis (in Polish). VI: 259–275.
- Łęgowski, Józef; Lehr-Spławiński, Tadeusz (1922). "Szczątki języka dawnych słowiańskich mieszkańców wyspy Rugji". Slavia Occidentalis (in Polish). II: 114–136.
- Lehr-Spławiński, Tadeusz (1934). O narzeczach Słowian nadbałtyckich (in Polish). Toruń.
- Milewski, Tadeusz (1930). "Pierwotne nazwy wyspy Rugji i słowiańskich jej mieszkańców". Slavia Occidentalis (in Polish). IX: 292–306.
