= Milewski =

Milewski, Milevsky, Milevski or Miļevskis is a surname which appears in many countries in various forms:

Language	Masculine	Feminine
Belarusian (Romanization)	Мілеўскі (Mileŭski)	Мілеўская (Mileŭskaja, Mileuskaya )
Latvian	Miļevskis	
Lithuanian	Miliauskas	Miliauskienė (married); Miliauskaitė (unmarried)
Macedonian (Romanization)	Милевски (Milevski)	Милевска (Milevska)
Polish	Milewski	Milewska
Romanian/Moldovan	Milevschi, Milevschii	
Russian (Romanization)	Милевский (Milevskiy, Milevskii, Milevsky)	Милевская (Milevskaya, Milevskaia, Milevskaja)
Ukrainian (Romanization)	Мілевський (Milevskyi, Milevskyy, Milevsky)	Мілевська (Milevska)
Other	Milewsky, Milefsky, Milefski, Milenski (Americanized)	

== People ==
- Alina Milevska (born 1995), Ukrainian figure skater
- Andrey Milewski (born 1977), Belarusian football player
- Anna Milewska (born 1931), Polish actress
- Artem Milevskyi (born 1985), Ukrainian footballer
- Blagoja Milevski (born 1971), Macedonian football manager and former player
- Dmitry Milevsky (born 1991), Russian football player
- Elizabeta Kancheska-Milevska (born 1970), Macedonian politician
- Jakub Milewski, Polish Catholic priest
- Jevgeņijs Miļevskis (born 1961), Latvian football striker
- Jürgen Milewski (born 1957), German footballer
- Ksenia Milevskaya (born 1990), Belarusian tennis player
- Moshe Milevsky, American academician and author
- Nikodem Milewski, Austrian music producer
- Paweł Milewski (born 1975), Polish diplomat
- Sebastian Milewski (born 1998), Polish footballer
- Tadeusz Milewski (1906–1966), Polish linguist
  - Milewski's typology, a language classification system
- Terry Milewski (born 1949), Canadian journalist
- Witold Milewski (1817–1889), Polish mathematician, physicist, and pedagogue
- Yevgeny Milevsky (born 1995), Belarusian football player
- Zygmunt Milewski (1934–2002), Polish Boxer

== See also ==
- Milevska planina, a mountain in Bulgaria and Serbia
