= Marcho-Magdeburgian dialect =

Extinct Slavic Lechitic dialect

The Marcho-Magdeburgian dialect, Old March and Magdeburg dialect is an extinct Slavic Lechitic dialect spoken by Slavic tribes living in the Old March and around Magdeburg. Linguistically, the dialect was particularly related to the Drevani language used until the 18th century in Wendland and belonged to the West Lechitic dialects.

== Features ==
=== Development of vowels and sonants ===
Proto-Slavic nasal vowels were preserved - *ǫ gave ą̊, e.g. Bombeck, Dambeke < PS *Bǫbъkъ, *Dǫbъkъ, and *ę gave narrow ę̇, e.g. Prinzlowe, Wenzlow < PS *Prędislavъ, *Vęťeslavъ. There are also traces of Lechitic apophony nasals: Randowe < PS *Rędovo.

Proto-Slavic *ě also yielded to Lechitic apophony – it gave a before the hard dental consonants, e.g. Gnadau, Latzke < PS *Gnědovo, *Lěsъko, and in other positions it gave e, e.g. Belin, Pechowe < PS *Bělinъ, *Pěxovo.

Proto-Slavic *e essentially gave e, although before the originally palatal consonants there was a tendency to narrow the pronunciation to ė, e.g. Britzin, Popeliz < PS *Berzinъ, *Popelicě.

The Proto-Slavic *i essentially gives i, e.g. Klinkov, Sydowe < PS *Klinъkovъ, *Židovo, but in the position before l it is reduced to e, e.g. Melcowe < PS *Milъkovo. Proto-Slavic *y is presented in a similar way, e.g. Dipkowe, Synowe < PS *Dypъkovo, *Synovo, and the yl group, like il, is rendered by el, e.g. Kubelke, Motelicze < PS *Kobylъky, *Motylicě.

The Proto-Slavic *a gave a, e.g. Cracowe, Gaddow < PS *Krakovo, *Gadovo, however, since the 10th century, a (including that formed from other Proto-Slavic sounds) has been labialized to o, e.g. Boben, Dontze, Sodin < PS *Babinъ, *Donicě, *Sadinъ. It developed differently only in the *ja- group, which gave je-, e.g. jeggowe < PS *Jajьkovo.

The Proto-Slavic *o has narrowed to ȯ, as evidenced by the frequent spelling with ⟨u⟩, e.g. Drozdowe or Drusdowe < PS *Drozdovo. However, the bifurcation of *o into ö/ü, characteristic of the Drevani area, is missing. The anlaut *o- has been provided with a prosthetic v-, e.g. Wustrewe, Wutzow < PS *Ostrovъ, *Osovъ, while in front of palatal consonants this group passed into vi-, as in Polabian, e.g. Wilnitz, Wiebelitz < PS *Voľьnica, *Oblica.

The Proto-Slavic *u most likely did not change its pronunciation and is continued by u, e.g. Bukowe, Lubicz < PS *Bukovo, *Ľubičь.

Yers in weak position disappeared, while in the strong position *ь gave e, e.g. Zwinez < PS *Svinьcь, and *ъ gave o, e.g. Zerkow < PS *Cŕ̥kъvь. The separate development of the two yers is a feature that coincides with the Drevani and Rani areas, and definitely distinguishes the Old March and Magdeburg dialects from the Polish and Pomeranian areas, where both yers produce a vowel of the same color.

Spellings such as Bukowe, Drozdowe attest to the reduction of the final vowel – similar processes also occurred in the Drevani and Rani areas.

The Proto-Slavic *r̥ (*ъr) regularly gave ar, and *ŕ̥ (*ьr) develops similarly before hard dental consonants, e.g. Parchowe, Tarnewitz < PS *Pr̥xovo, *Tŕ̥novica, with the a becoming labialized over time, so that the group was thus or, e.g. Morditz, Storkow < PS *Mr̥dicě, *Str̥kovъ.

The Proto-Slavic *l̥ and *ĺ̥ (*ъl and *ьl) similarly to the other West Lechitic dialects became mixed and gave ol, e.g. Dolchow, Kolpin < PS *Dĺ̥govъ, *Kl̥pinъ.

The development of *TorT groups was inconsistent – TarT, e.g. Gardiss, Karwitz < PS *Gordъčь, *Korvicě, and TroT, e.g. Drogawiz, Potgrot < psł. *Dorgovicě, *Podъgordъ, competed with each other. The TarT type became established much later than in the Drevani and Rani dialects.

The *TerT group is almost uniquely given over by TreT or TriT, e.g. Brisen, Stresen < PS *Berzьno, *Strežьno. The only exception seems to be Derwen < PS *Dervьno.

The *TolT group generally yielded to a metathesis to TlåT, as in Drevani dialect, e.g. Clodene, Gladove < PS *Koldьno, *Goldovo, cases of keeping TolT are rare, e.g. Coldiz, Golwicz < PS *Koldicě, *Golvicě. No examples for *TelT group descendants.

Anlaut *orT under circumflex intonation has passed into roT (meanwhile in Drevani it became råT), e.g. Rostocke < PS *Orz-tokъ.

=== Development of consonants ===
The spelling does not resolve whether the original palatal consonants were depalatalized before the front vowels, as in the Drevani and Rani dialects.

Written monuments lack the distinction of the series s, c, z from š, č, ž, e.g. Plessow, Petzenow, Stressowe < PS *Plěševъ, *Pečenovъ, *Streševo, which most likely indicates the mazuration of the Marcho-Magdeburgian dialect.

== Bibliography ==
- Papierkowski, Stanisław (1930). "Szczątki języka słowiańskich mieszkańców Starej Marchji i okolic Magdeburga". Slavia Occidentalis. IX: 73–124.
