= Polabian =

Polabian may refer to:

- Polabian language, an extinct Slavic language spoken by Polabians
- Polabians, an extinct Slavic tribe living in the eastern part of today's Germany
