= Western Pomeranian dialects =

Extinct West Slavic language

Western Pomeranian
- Native to: Poland, Germany
- Region: Western Pomerania
- Extinct: 17th century
- Language family: Indo-European: Balto-Slavic; Slavic; West Slavic; Lechitic; Pomeranian; Western Pomeranian

Language codes
- ISO 639-3: –

Western Pomeranian (Polish: zachodniopomorski) is an extinct ethnolect formerly spoken in Western Pomerania possibly until the end of the 17th century. It bordered the now extinct Polabian language to the west and Kashubian and Slovincian to the east and was a transitional dialect between them. It was considered part of the Pomeranian language. It later saw East Low German influence beginning in the 13th–14th centuries.

No documents were ever written in this language and all linguistic evidence comes from toponyms; other traces can be seen in the names of rivers, lakes, forests and given names and surnames.

== Phonetics ==
Western Pomeranian shows traits connecting it with both northern Poland, including Pomeranian, namely Kashubian and Slovincian, Greater Poland, and Masovia, as well as a few traits connecting with Polabian. Based on the dates of attested forms, it appears that Western Pomeranian split off from Eastern Lechitic in the 8-9th century, and at this time was in closer contact with Polabian, but later felt influence from Eastern Lechitic.

=== Vowels ===
Proto-Slavic *TarT did not undergo metathesis, as in Polabian, and in contrast to Polish, and in Western Pomeranian could be either TarT or TerT: Dargozlaw (1269), Dergschlaff (1618). Changing TarT to TerT is dated to the pre-literate era and connects Western Pomeranian with other northern dialects. In the southeast of the region, -ro- forms are attested in accordance with the Polish development, and can also be seen in Kashubia, where -ar- was original and later -ro- forms arose under influence of Polish: Brunksruhe (20th century), Kroll (20th century), Gruchelkatehn (20th century). A few cases of sporadic -ro- are attested: Brosland if from *Brož- (20th century), Belgrod (1124, 1159), Zitarigroda (1124), Stargrod (1140), also -ro- ~ -ru-: Crolov (1341), Crulow (1491); also -ru-: Brunnow (1523), -ra-: Belgrada (1159), -re-: Crethemin (1425), and -re- ~ -ro-: Kresyn (1407), Crossin (1628), Gressin (1137), Grossin (1450) - however the -ra- and -re- could potentially not derive frmo *TarT. The reflex -ro- occurs along the south-eastern edge of the area. The forms Zitarigroda (1124) for Stargard Szczecińśki and Belgrod (1124) and Belgroensem (1125) for Białogard were written by German monks Ebo and Preifling writing about Otton's excursion to Pomerania, who was accompanied by Poles, namely a translator Wojciech, who had contact with Pomeranian, and likely arose from his native language.

Proto-Slavic *l̥ *ĺ̥ become oł (that is with a hard l) as in Polabian and other Pomeranian dialects; also in some Sorbian dialects; this oł could also become uł, which is seen regularly after labial and velar consonants; this also could be the result of scribes substituting letters: Culpin (1315), Culpino (1281), Mulkenthin (1338), Wulckow (1628). The city Słupsk and the river Słupia show two reflexes: Pomeranian oł, e.g. Stolp (1227), Stolpz (1276), Stolpzk (1294); Stolpam rivus (1209), Stolpa (1281), and Polish łu: Slupsk (1180), Slupsko (1236), Slupsech (1238); Slupam (1278); in Slovincian the town was called Slëpsk ~ Slëpskô with a reflex from an old short a typical of Slovincian and Kashubian; all instances of attested łu came from Polish chancelleries whereas all instances of oł came from documents made in Western Pomernian or in German chancelleries; also in the latter forms with lu are seen: Stulpa (1414-1416), Stulpe (1438); other exceptions do not occur.

Proto-Slavic *ŕ̥ generally gives ar, but sometimes gives er: Zerno (1628), Czernow (1323), Zerneglaw (1628), Czernekowe (1486), Perlow (1618), similar to *TarT potentially giving TerT; compare forms also attested like Zarnow, Sarne. It is possible that this was still ar with softening of the previous consonant, so ’arT, as in Kashubian, and e was used by the given German scribe to show palatalness. The forms Dirloua (1205), Cirnowe (1180-1183), Cyrnowe (1237), Tirnow (1269) could suggest a weakening of the ablaut before the hard consonant, seen also with *ěT, *ęT, and *eT. It is uncertain of the result ar kept palatalization on the preceding consonant as it did in Kashubian and Polabian. *ŕ̥ in other positions, that is not before a hard consonant, becomes er: Cerben (1279), Cernin (1281), or also older ir; the earliest instance of er < ir is Verchowe (1158). There are many cases of *l̥ giving er, ar, and three with or: Varbsin (1618), Swarsosw (1619), Varchentin (1784), Zartenthin (1784), Farchmin (1780), Scharnitz (1714), Zarben (1307), suggesting that ar was a later development, compare Dersentyn (1275), Dersentin (1628), and Dorsentin (1779-1785). Forms like Cirbe (1260), Cerben (1279), Czerben (1291), Cerben (1307), Zarben (1307) < *Sьrby suggest a fluctiation of ŕ̥ and *ъ, compare Polish Serb, pasierb, siorbać - in short ŕ̥ originally gave ir, er already from the 13th century and later, perhaps from the 17th century, ar and less often or. Proto-Slavic r̥ become ar, as in Polish, occurring before the change of ar > er around the 12th century, as ar from various sources often shifts to er.

Initial o- had a tendency to gain prothetic w-, as in Polabian, Kashubian, Pomeranian, and many Polish dialects as well as other West Slavic languages, but not everywhere at the same time; in the east and the southern border there are examples with initial o-: Obesda (1281), Oblanse (1301), Olsewitz (1804), Ostrowo (1835), Olsembork (1433), Obrita (1226), Oboy (1224); it is likely this prothesis began in 13th century as shown by transcriptions from 1224-1281: Wobrita (1200-1208), Wobasdo (1294), Wobelancz (1413). There are also many examples of transcriptions with wu-, suggestion potentially a raising of /wɔ/ > /wo/ > /wu/; the geographic distribution of initial wu- is not equal everywhere, but dominates in the area around the upper drainage basin of the Parsęta, Rega, and Drawa; in Mecklenburg-Vorpommern west of the Odra initial wu- is exceptional; this change of wo- > wu- begins in the 14th century, as it is unattested in the 13th century, and even gains dominance by then and was likely a dialectal feature characteristic of the central region. There are four examples of a potential change to wi- before a soft consonant, as in Polabian: Werle (1284), Welschberg (20th century), Welsenborch (1284), Weltzke (1618), reaching possibly as far as east of the Odra.

Initial ja- often raised to je-, as in Greater Polish and Masovian, however this change is inconsistent and in few words, often alongside a form with ja-, as only two toponyms occur exclusively with je-, and the first attestations of this change come from the 12th century: Geniphyz (1273) ~ Janeuitz (1286); forms with ja- occur more often near Szczecin. Forms with je- were more likely to occur when the word began with jar-, see above for the change of ar to er.

Initial ra- also inconsistently changes to re- as in other northern dialects of Poland, similar to how ar changes to er, but this change is restricted to particular words, and there are somewhat more attestations with ra- over re- scattered across the whole region.

The Lechitic ablaut whereby *ě changes to a before hard dental consonants is present as in all of Lechitic (see also History of the Polish language for more on the Lechitic ablaut): Bialcur (< *Bělokury) with 25 examples, however 21 examples without this ablaut are also present: Belegarde (1159) (< *Bělogardъ); there also exist cases where ablaut is both present and absent for a given place: Obesda (1281) ~ Wobasdo (1294) (< *Objězda). Ablauted forms occur more often in the east and ablautless forms more in the west, especially along the lower Odra and in the drainage basin of the Płonia, and the pressence of this ablaut weakens beyond this region towards the West, and in Mecklenburg-Vorpommern there are 3 examples of ablaut: Pana, Pyan, Pyaceke but 6 without: Trebethestorpe, Medewede, Trebetowe, Belbug, Belkowe, Peetzikke; ablaut is more often lacking after labial consonants, but is also absent after other consonants as well: Dretoho (1243) (< *Drětovo), Gedde (1618) (< *Jědy), Lyeskoue (1240) (< *Lěsъkov-). There are also cases where o replaces a: Bolhberg (20th century) (< *běl-), Boldenberge (1523) (< *běl-), Lotezige, Lotzke (1486) (< *Lěsъky).

The Proto-Slavic morphemes *-ьcь, *-ъkъ appear here without mobile e, something shared by modern Kashubian and historically Greater Poland and Masovia: Bolenc (1631), Bork (1276), and forms with -e- occur only sporadically and are scattered across the region: Colek (1278), Gardiz (1314); Gardiz may be understood as having been formed with either *-ica or *-ьcь. Notably, many German clerks added vowels here between consonant clusters that would have been difficult for them: Cedelin (1224) (< *Sedlinъ), Chemekenmolen (1321). Finally, transcriptions wit -itz, -ize, -ic could possibly be from *-ica and not *-ьcь.

The development of the Proto-Slavic nasal vowels *ę and *ǫ is muddy, in part due to an incomplete description of the nasals in Pomerania as a whole as well as because of German influence, but given that Germanization completed in the 16th century, it is likely that sound changes that occurred in historic Polish also occurred in much of Pomerania. It is also uncertain if nasal vowels assimilated to the following consonant as in modern Polish.

Many place names with *ę contain the formant *-ętin-: Mechentic (1281), Mallenzin (1755), and in all cases were transcribed with -en-. M there are few other instances of *ę, which was written as eN, i(y)N, or aN; in the 12th and 13th century i(y)N was most common, in the 14th century eN was the most common, and aN only appears commonly in the 18th century. These transcriptions do not necessarily by themselves show a merger of *ę and *ǫ like that of late Old Polish. Thus, it appears that Proto-Slavic *ę in positions unaffected by the Lechitic ablaut continued as *ę or *į, *y̨ with *ę continuing into the 14th-17th centuries, but this could be an orthographic tradition. Of note here is the development of *ę in Kashubian in words such as cygnąc, which is realized as /i/ likely through an intermediate step of *į, and a similar situation occurred in Mecklenburg Pomeranian, where *ęT sometimes changed to aNT, and in others remained as eNT, and otherwise is eN; transcriptions with iN occur here less frequently than in Western Pomerania. The distribution of transcriptions with iN, eN, and aN is not connected with any particular geographic locations, and all three appear across the region. *ę underwent the Lechitic ablaut, becoming *ąT or *ǫT, but instances of *ęT can be seen, suggesting this change was limited to particular words.

Proto-Slavic *ǫ in Western Pomeranian placenames from the 12th and 13th centuries are often written with an, am, suggesting a realization ą; there is one instance of uN: Gunbin, Gummin (1176), being the result of the preceding velar consonant g; there is one instance of oN: Commotouwe (1226) and one with im: Wozmezimbne (1276), both occurring the western part of the region. This state continues in the 14th century, where most transcriptions contain aN and there are no instances of oN, o, or uN, u, but three instances eN occur: Dentzick (1337), Clemme (1322), and Pepelow (1308), and one instance with e: Gumethow (1337), also in the west; this indicates a potential merger of the two vowels as in Polish whereby ą fronts towards ę. Then in the 15th century, when in Polish old long ą becomes ǫ and old short ą becomes ę, old long ą ~ ǫ in Western Pomeranian is transcribed with oN and uN: Romptzke (1476) ~ Rumpske (1430) and also Grumbckow (1426) and old short ą are written with eN: Prebbentow (1430), Schmentzin (1479), similar to what happened in Polish; this change can be seen in the eastern borderlands of the region. This choice of vowels generally continues in the 16th century through the 20th century with a gradual decrease of aN in favor of oN, uN, and eN.

The change of TarT of various origins to TerT was once a trait common to northern Poland, seen today in northern Masovia, but in the Middle Ages affected Masovia, Greater Poland, and Pomerania, occurring after the vocalization of yers, possibly around the 12th century; the first instances of -er- from -ar- in Western Pomerania can be seen in the 13th century: Bandergowe (1233), Berenslauu (1255); the oldest example from Greater Poland is Lederg from the Bull of Gniezno from 1136. This change in the Middle Ages was likely not ubiquitous and inconsistent, possibly seen as a worse form, and this is reflected in Western Pomeranian placenames, as of 126 attested forms with original -ar-, only 22 have -er-, and forms referring to the same place with -er- usually occur alongside forms with -ar-; forms with -er- are spread across the region, occurring slightly more often in the western and northern parts. Sporadically, -or- can be seen instead of -ar-, but is limited to two cases: Corlin (1299) and Corlyn (1421).

The ablaut of *eT > *’oT has historically been considered an important isogloss in Lechitic lects (see also History of the Polish language), and is considered a chiefly Polish trait, occurring in most Polish dialect groups, but not in western Lechitic, including Polabian. In eastern Pomerania, placenames predominately show ’oT < eT: Drzon (1819), Pazonke (1863), Ceczonowo (1249), Gesorke (1779-1785), Schorawe (1819), Poponke (20th century), Clonnevytze (1485); but also forms without ablaut occur here: Vressou (1285); the center of Western Pomerania sporadically show ablaut: Jesorcke (1569), Brosamuste (1176-1180), but much more often ablaut is missing: Ziraua (1205), Cusserowe (1273), Sedel (1556), Teterow (1289), Petervitz (1263), Vressow (1240), Selenowe (1282), Drenow (1276); finally, in the west from the drainage basin of the Odra ablautless forms occur nearly exceptionlessly, with one unexpected form Sorauitzi (1186) on the island of Wolin. In Mecklenburg Pomeranian, a few placenames with ablaut can be seen: Dronevis (1253), Necroz (1178), Wrodowe (1280), Wrot (1251), Cremun (1278), but forms without ablaut are more common.

=== Consonants ===
The change of *ť > ć occurred in the eastern part of this region, as it did in Kashubian, but not in the west, as it did not in Polabian; the border of this change is along the drainage basic of the Wieprz river; west of the Wieprz to the Parsęta show alternative forms with both t or ć, and the further west the placement, the less ć appears; however this could also be the result of the traditions of the given transcription system. It is difficult to establish a southern border, but transcriptions with t occur almost exceptionlessly up to the border of the Odra with except two places near Szczecin and Kamień Pomorski: Messcentyn (1298) and Cytzemer (1318), being the result of either a mutual sound change or being named after someone from the south with this change. It is impossible to determine if kaszubienie occurred here later, that is a change of ć, dź to c, dz. The change of *ď > dź had a parallel development to *ť > ć, but there are fewer examples with this, making it difficult to determine the exact details of this change.

Western Pomeranian serves as a transitional zone between Polabian and the rest of Lechitic when it comes to the change of Proto-Slavic *ri *re > *ři *ře, as this change did not occur in Polabian but did occur in the rest of Lechitic, however early transcriptions make it difficult to ascertain the true value of the phoneme, as it could be written with r as well as rs, rc, rtz, rcz, etc. Some transcriptions allow for certainty; in the east up to the Wiperz this change occurred, and also the southern borderlands shows *ř; in the remaining area shows predominately *r with a few instances of *ř: Kolbrzega (1659-1665), Mersin (1534), Zabersowe (1321), Tumerzelize (1270); a few instances of transcriptions with z and cz occur: Dwiczin ~ Duirin (1270), Scloubuze (1411-1414), Zmogozewic (1227), suggesting a potential change to *ř. the western reach of *ř corresponds roughly with the western border of *ť, ď > ć, dź, but is somewhat more limited.

Changes found in Polabian can be found here only inconsistently, numbering only 10 examples, and these examples may be interpreted ambiguously. They occur mostly in the north-west of the region. The change of *o- > vü- (vi-) before a soft consonant is seen in the 12th century and is limited to two stems: *olьš- and *orьl-, occurring in the south and the west of the region: (from *olьš-) Welschberg (20th century), Welsenborch (1284), Weltzke (1618) (from *orьl-) Werle (1284); two other examples include Wostentin (1308) ~ Wessentyn (1321) and Wistrouece (1180). The diphthongization of *y to oi (ui) and ei after labials is seen in the 9th century as ui and then in the 12th century as oi; diphthongization occurred often in Mecklenburg Pomeranian, but an equal amount of cases without marking of diphthongization occur: Byl ~ Boytin, Wizoka ~ Wejsin; in Western Pomeranian examples include Moysouwe (1364), Moizow (1618), and Weykow (1299); however this choice of transcription could have arisen due to difficulties of differentiating slavic i and y, and might not be a phonetic realization shared with Polabian. Finally, the change of *TălT > *TlåT is considered Polabian, and transcriptions with TloT predominately occur in Mecklenburg: Clodeniz, Glouen; in Western Pomerania two examples with this reflex occur but may be considered doubtful: Clodo (1320), Cladowe (1328), and 9 placenames with the word-forming element *-glovy: Zerneglaw (1628), however the use of a here could be the result of substituting it for o by German scribes.

== See also ==
- Polish language
- History of the Polish language
- Kashubian language
- Slovincian language
- Polabian language

== Bibliography ==
- Rzetelska-Feleszko, Ewa; Duma, Jerzy (1996). Językowa przeszłość Pomorza zachodniego na podstawie nazw miejscowych. Warsaw: Slawistyczny Ośrodek Wydawniczy. ISBN 83-86619-41-4.
- Klemensiewicz, Zenon; Lehr-Spławiński, Tadeusz; Urbańczyk, Stanisław (1965). Gramatyka historyczna języka polskiego (in Polish) (III ed.). Warsaw: Wydawnictwo Naukowe PWN.
