= Lechitic languages =

Subgroup of West Slavic languages

Lechitic
- Geographic distribution: Poland
- Linguistic classification: Indo-European: Balto-Slavic; Slavic; West Slavic; Lechitic
- Subdivisions: East Lechitic (Polish and Silesian); West Lechitic † (includes Marcho-Magdeburgian, Rani) (evolved into Polabian); Pomeranian/Middle Lechitic † (evolved into Kashubian and Slovincian †)

Language codes
- Glottolog: lech1241
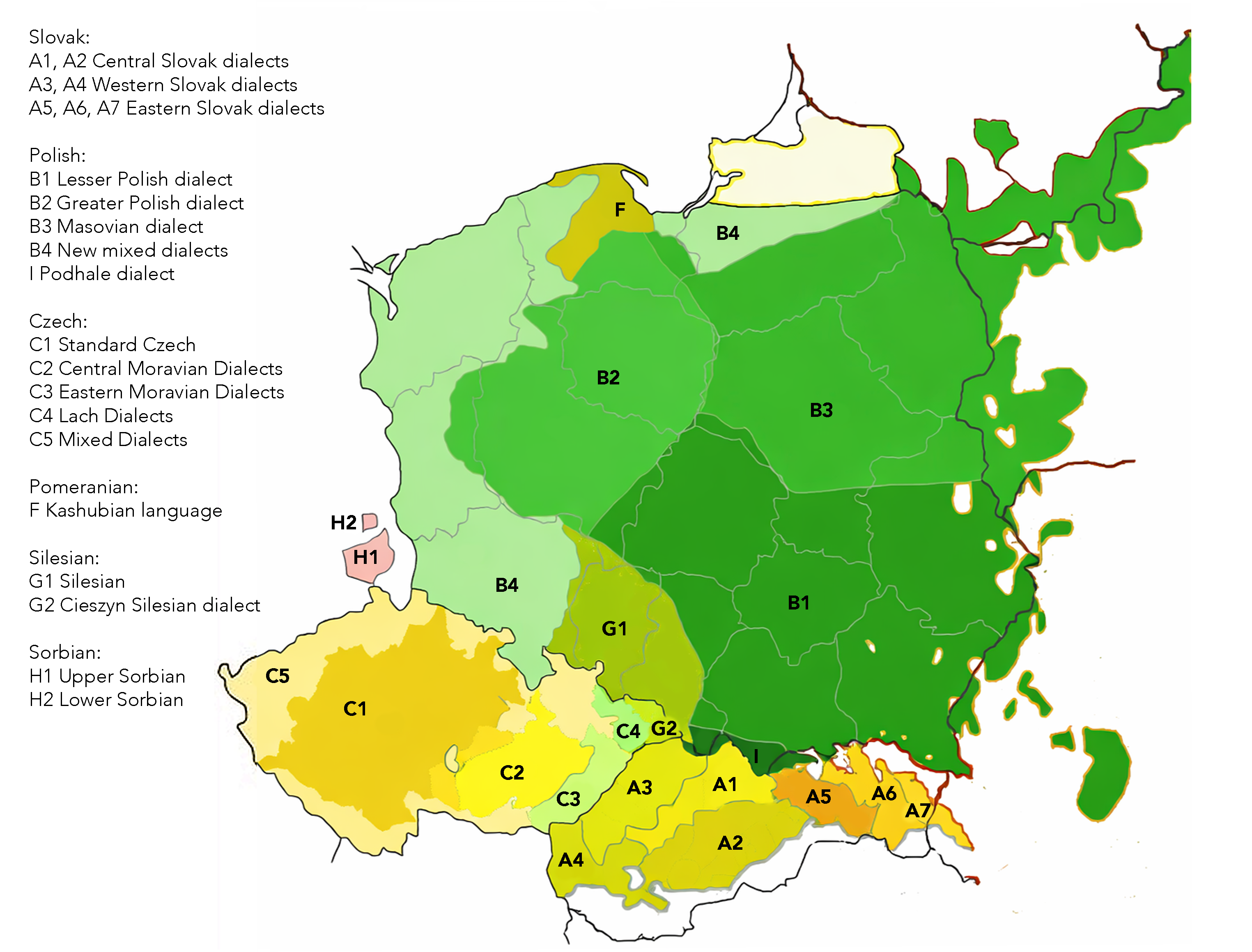
- Contemporary Lechitic dialects in green (B/F/G), within West Slavic

The Lechitic (or Lekhitic) languages are a language subgroup consisting of Polish and several other languages and dialects that were once spoken in the area that is now Poland and eastern Germany. It is one of the branches of the larger West Slavic subgroup; the other branches of this subgroup are the Czech–Slovak languages and the Sorbian languages.

== Languages ==
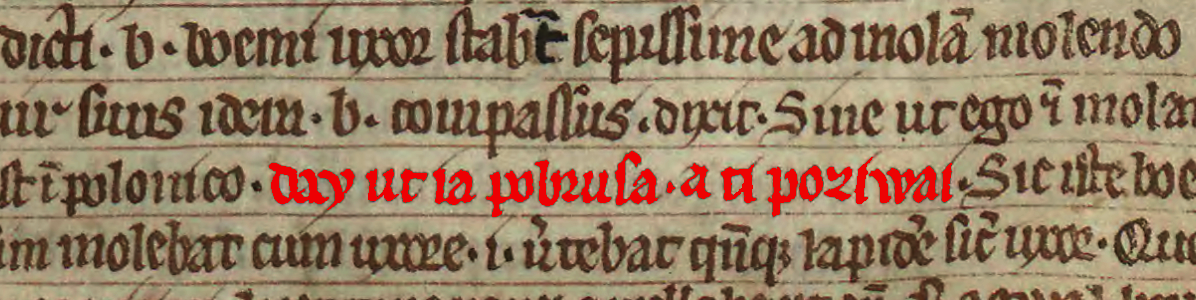
The Book of Henryków, containing what is claimed to be the first written Polish sentence

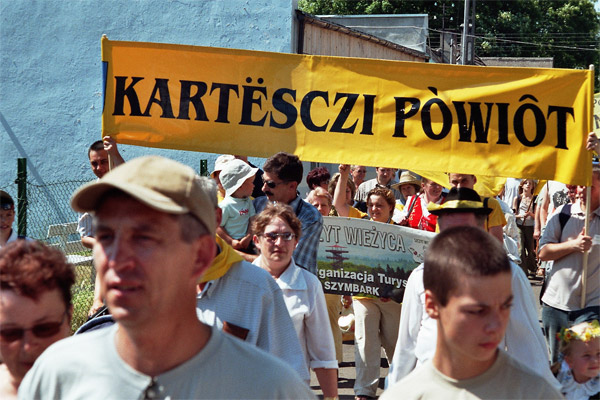
Kashubian jamboree in Łeba in 2005 – banner showing the Kashubian name of Kartuzy County

Historical distribution of Lechitic languages

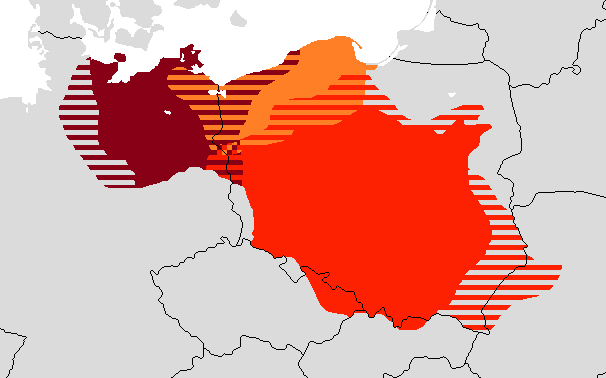
c. 9th–10th century

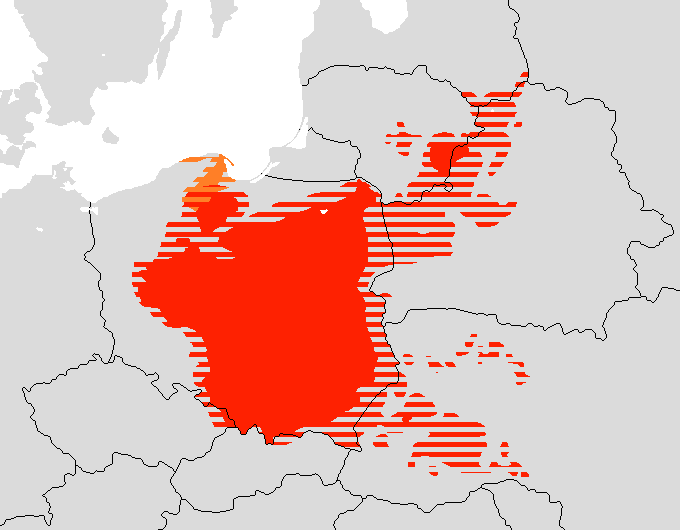
1900

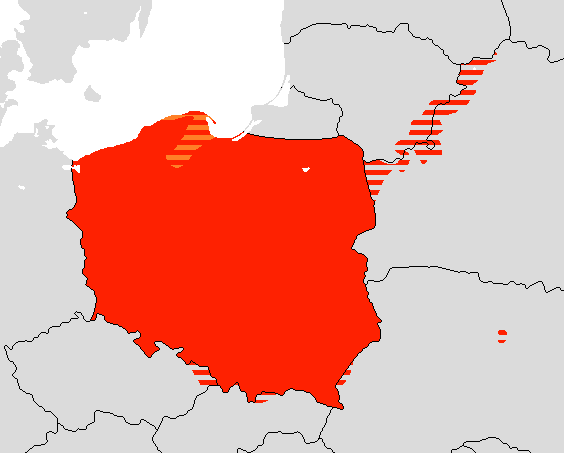
2007

Distribution of Lechitic-speaking populations over the centuries in relation to modern state borders:
West Lechitic dialects †
Central Lechitic dialects
East Lechitic dialects

The Lechitic languages are:

- Polish, used by approximately 38 million native speakers in Poland and several million elsewhere. Polish is considered to have several dialects, including Greater Polish, Lesser Polish, and Masovian, among others;
  - Silesian, used today by over 530,000 people (2011 census) in Polish Silesia and by some more in Czech Silesia. The different varieties of Silesian are often considered to be dialects of Polish and Czech, and are sometimes seen as forming a distinct language;
- Pomeranian, spoken by Slavic Pomeranians, of which the only remaining varieties are:
  - Kashubian, used today by over 110,000 people (2011 census) in the eastern part of Pomerania. Sometimes it is considered a dialect of Polish.
  - Slovincian, extinct since the 20th century. Sometimes considered a dialect of Kashubian.
  - Western Pomeranian, a transitional dialect group with Polabian, extinct probably 17th century.
- Polabian, extinct since the mid-18th century, a West Lechitic language formerly spoken by Slavic peoples in areas between the Oder and Elbe rivers and further West in what is now the northeast of Germany.

== Features ==
Common West Slavic features that are also present in Lechitic:

1. χ́ > š́ in front of ě_{2}, i_{2}
2. sk, zɡ > š́č́, ž́ǯ́ in front of ě_{2}, i_{2}
3. χ́ > š́ after i, ь, ę, ŕ̥
4. epenthetic l only in initial position after soft labials
5. -ě_{3} in the nominative/accusative plural and genitive singular (duš́ě_{3}) and accusative plural of kon'ě_{3} (instead of -ę)
6. replacement of the instrumental singular ending -omъ with -ъmъ
7. Creation of the nominative masculine/neuter singular ending/active preterite participle ending -a (reka, nesa instead of reky, nesy
8. õrt-, õlt- > rot-, lot- (rola, radło)
9. (ti̯, di̯ >) t́̄, d́̄; kt́ > ć, ʒ́
10. Extension of the pronoun tъ > tъnъ
11. Replacement of č́ьto with co via the genitive singular č́ьso
12. Use of the compound adjectival genitive and dative masculine/neuter singular endings -ego and -emu through analogy with jego, jemu
13. Temporal adverbs ending in -dy instead of -da
14. Creation of the conjunction of intent aby
15. Tendency for establishing a non-mobile accent
16. Tendency to raise long vowels

There was no Proto-Lechitic language, but rather Lechitic languages are a group of dialects with many shared features. The central and eastern territories came under the control of the Piasts, which created a political, cultural (especially religious) unit, which caused the Pomeranians and Polabians to have weaker contact, as the Pomeranians were absorbed into the state by Mieszko I and began integrating with the Eastern Lechites.

Common Lechitic features include:

1. Labiovelarization of *telt (but compare Polabian mlåkə and Kashubian/Slovincian młȯko; also czółn)
2. Replacement of *tort, tolt, tert, telt
  1. In accented and preaccented syllables (i.e. under rising intonation): tórᵒt > tᵒrot > trot
  2. In circumflex and post-accented syllables (i.e. under falling intonation) *tolt > tòlᵒt or 'tolòt > talt
3. Softening of consonants before front vowels
4. Velarization of ŕ̥
5. Development of sonants (voiced consonants) into complex groups of a vowel and a consonant r, l
  1. west and central ĺ̥ l̥ > oł > åu̯; Pĺ̥T (before a non-back hard consonant_ in the northeast > 'el, in the south > 'il; after TČKP and Pĺ̥T in the northeast ĺ̥ l̥ > oł
  2. ŕ̥T, r̥ > ar (and then in Polabian > or); ŕ̥T́ > ir (Polabian) > er >ar, or > (Polish) ir, iř > er, eř (which hardens before labials and ch)
6. Hardening of consonants before r̥ < ŕ̥T
  - ěT > 'a (Lechitic ablaut)
  - ęT > ǫ
7. eT >'o

== Sample text ==
The following is the Lord's Prayer in several of the Lechitic languages:

Polish

Ojcze nasz, któryś jest w niebie,
święć się imię Twoje,
przyjdź królestwo Twoje,
bądź wola Twoja
jako w niebie tak i na ziemi.
Chleba naszego powszedniego daj nam dzisiaj.
I odpuść nam nasze winy,
jako i my odpuszczamy naszym winowajcom.
I nie wódź nas na pokuszenie,
ale nas zbaw ode złego.
Amen.

Upper Silesian

Fatrze nŏsz, kery jeżeś we niebie,
bydź poświyncōne miano Twoje.
Przińdź krōlestwo Twoje,
bydź wola Twoja,
jako we niebie, tak tyż na ziymi.
Chlyb nŏsz kŏżdodziynny dej nōm dzisiŏk.
A ôdpuś nōm nasze winy,
jako a my ôdpuszczōmy naszym winnikōm.
A niy wōdź nŏs na pokuszyniy,
nale zbŏw nŏs ôde złygo.
Amyn.

Kashubian

Òjcze nasz, jaczi jes w niebie,
niech sã swiãcy Twòje miono,
niech przińdze Twòje królestwò,
niech mdze Twòja wòlô
jakno w niebie tak téż na zemi.
Chleba najégò pòwszednégò dôj nóm dzysô
i òdpùscë nóm naje winë,
jak i më òdpùszcziwómë naszim winowajcóm.
A nie dopùscë na nas pòkùszeniô,
ale nas zbawi òde złégò.
Amen.

Polabian

Nôße Wader, ta toy giß wa Nebisgáy,
Sjungta woarda tügí Geima,
tia Rîk komma,
tia Willia ſchinyôt,
kok wa Nebisgáy, tôk kak no Sime,
Nôßi wißedanneisna Stgeiba doy nâm dâns,
un wittedoy nâm nôße Ggrêch,
kak moy wittedoyime nôßem Grêsmarim,
Ni bringoy nôs ka Warſikónye,
tay löſoáy nôs wit wißókak Chaudak.
Amen.

== Etymology ==
The term "Lechitic" is applied both to the languages of this group and to Slavic peoples speaking these languages (known as Lechites). It is related to the name of the legendary Polish forefather Lech and the name Lechia, by which Poland was formerly sometimes known.

== See also ==
- Lech, Czech and Rus
- West Lechitic dialects
