= Adam Suprun =

Belarusian linguist and slavist (1928–1999)

- Born: October 24, 1928; Poltava, Ukraine
- Died: August 18, 1999 (aged 70); Minsk, Belarus
- Education: Kyrgyz National University (BA, 1952), Moscow State University (PhD, 1955)
- Occupation: Linguist
- Known for: Research on the Polabian language, etymology, corpus linguistics

Adam Suprun (October 24, 1928 – August 18, 1999) was a Belarusian linguist and professor. He held the titles of Habilitated Doctor of Philological Sciences and Habilitated Doctor of Pedagogical Sciences, and was recognized as an Honoured Scholar of the Republic of Belarus. Suprun served as Head of the Department of Theoretical and Slavic Linguistics at the Belarusian State University.

== Life ==
Adam Suprun was born on October 24, 1928, in Poltava, Ukraine. He graduated from Kyrgyz National University in 1952. In 1955, he defended his doctoral thesis at Moscow State University titled Words with Numeral Roots in Modern Russian Literary Language.

In 1961, he published the monograph Старославянские числительные (Old Church Slavonic Numerals). In 1966, he defended his habilitation thesis at the University of Leningrad entitled Славянские числительные: Становление числительных как особой части речи (Slavic Numerals: The Formation of Numerals as a Specific Part of Speech).

That same year, at the Belarusian State University, Suprun founded the Department of Theoretical and Slavic Linguistics, which he headed for over 30 years. He played a key role in developing Slavic studies in Belarus: under his initiative, all Slavic languages were introduced into the curriculum of the Faculty of Philology, and in 1993, the specialisation Slavic Philology was established.

In 1981, at the Belarusian State University in Minsk, Suprun defended his second habilitation thesis, Glottodidactic Issues of Teaching Russian in Belarusian Schools, earning a habilitated doctorate in pedagogy. He was frequently invited to deliver lectures and presentations at universities and research centres in Austria, Bulgaria, Hungary, Denmark, Spain, Luxembourg, Poland, Slovakia, Slovenia, the United States, Finland, Croatia, and the Czech Republic, among others.

Since 1958, Suprun participated in all International Congresses of Slavists and was a member of the Belarusian Committee of Slavists.

== Research interests ==
In the field of Slavic studies, Adam Suprun is recognised as an authority in etymology, studies of the Polabian language, lexicology, typology of Slavic languages, psycholinguistics, glottodidactics, and text linguistics. He authored more than 600 publications, including over 60 books and brochures.

One of Suprun's major research areas was the study of Slavic languages in both lexical and grammatical aspects, in diachronic and synchronic perspectives. His systematic and comparative research on numerals and quantitative categories in Slavic languages is well known.

Suprun also pioneered the use of statistical methods in linguistic research. Under his supervision, five frequency dictionaries were compiled, representing various types of Belarusian discourse.

Lexicology was among Suprun's principal interests. He served as editor-in-chief for several frequency and associative dictionaries and promoted the application of mathematical and statistical methods in lexicon studies. Under his guidance, a group of researchers employed these new approaches, resulting in the collective monograph Методы изучения лексики (Methods of Lexicon Research), which remains a recommended reference for lexical analysis. The volume includes two of his original articles.

In his book Лексическая типология славянских языков (Lexical Typology of Slavic Languages), Suprun identified parameters for analysing the lexicons of Slavic languages, including:

- vocabulary size;
- proportion of most frequent words in texts;
- distribution of parts of speech;
- morphemic structure and word-formation methods;
- degree of semantic similarity among frequent lexemes;
- structure of semantic groupings;
- characteristics of hyponym–hyperonym relations;
- stylistic stratification;
- word associations;
- lexical compatibility.

Suprun's contributions to Polabistics are also widely recognised.

A significant portion of Suprun's research focused on Belarusian linguistics. In 1967, he published several works on the history and modern state of the Belarusian language. He extensively studied Belarusian–Russian bilingualism and co-authored Russian-language textbooks for Belarusian-medium schools, which were reissued multiple times.

From 1968 onward, Suprun worked in psycholinguistics and contributed to the collective monograph Основы теории речевой деятельности (Basics of the Theory of Speech Activity), later developing these ideas in his own book Лекции по теории речевой деятельности (Lectures on the Theory of Speech Activity).

His students continued this work by compiling associative dictionaries in various languages, including Belarusian, Latvian, Kyrgyz, and Turkish.

Text linguistics also featured among Suprun's interests, as reflected in his posthumously published monograph Исследования по лингвистике текста (Research in Text Linguistics).

Suprun was a long-time contributor to the Этымалагічны слоўнік беларускай мовы (Etymological Dictionary of the Belarusian Language, 1978–2017).

Among his textbooks are three series of lecture notes on linguistics and the widely used Введение в славянскую филологию (Introduction to Slavic Philology), reissued in 2019. His chapter Жизнь древних славян по данным их языка (The Life of the Ancient Slavs According to Their Language) was published separately after his death.

== Scientific school ==
Suprun was regarded as an influential educator. More than 60 doctoral theses were completed under his supervision, and he served as a consultant for 10 habilitations. His students and their academic successors teach at universities across Belarus as well as in Austria, Hungary, India, Germany, Lithuania, Poland, Russia, Turkey, Ukraine, the Czech Republic, and several Arab and African countries.

Suprun died on August 18, 1999, in Minsk. Following his death, members of the Department of Theoretical and Slavic Linguistics at the Belarusian State University, including his students and their students, published and reissued a number of his works.

In 2003, the book Память и слава: К 75-летию со дня рождения профессора А. Е. Супруна (Memory and Glory: On the 75th Anniversary of the Birth of Professor A. Suprun) was published as part of the Memoria et Gloria series. The volume includes a complete bibliography of Suprun's works and articles on the Polabian language, which are considered bibliographic rarities.

Ten years later, as part of the Моваведы Беларусі (Linguists of Belarus) series, the collection Выбраныя працы (Selected Works) was published. It included Suprun’s writings on Праславянский язык, Старославянский язык, Церковно-славянский язык (The Proto-Slavic Language, the Old Church Slavonic Language, and the Church Slavonic Language).
