= Reinhold Olesch =

Silesian linguist

- Born: September 24, 1910; Zalenze, Province of Silesia, German Empire
- Died: June 23, 1990 (aged 79); Brühl, North Rhine-Westphalia, West Germany

Academic background
- Education: German Charles-Ferdinand University
- Alma mater: FWU Berlin
- Thesis: (1935)
- Doctoral advisor: Max Vasmer
- Influences: Nikolai Trubetzkoy

Academic work
- Discipline: Linguistics
- Sub-discipline: Slavic studies
- Institutions: University of Greifswald; University of Vienna
- Main interests: Chakavian, Kashubian, Polabian, Silesian and Sorbian languages

Reinhold Olesch (September 24, 1910 in Zalenze, Upper Silesia – June 23, 1990 in Brühl, Rhineland) was a linguist, Slavic studies Professor of University of Vienna. He researched the Slavonic dialects of Upper Silesia, which he recognized as his mother tongue. He published several works about them, including: "Die slawischen Dialekte Oberschlesiens" (Slavonic dialects of Upper Silesia) and "Beiträge zur oberschlesischen Dialektforschung – Die Mundart der Kobylorze".
