= Tadeusz Milewski =

Polish linguist

- Born: 17 May 1906; Kolomyia, Kingdom of Galicia and Lodomeria (now Ukraine)
- Died: 5 March 1966 (aged 59); Kraków, Poland
- Known for: Milewski's typology

Academic background
- Education: University of Lviv
- Thesis: Przyczynki do dziejów języka połabskiego (1929)
- Doctoral advisor: Tadeusz Lehr-Spławiński

Academic work
- Discipline: Linguistics
- Institutions: Jagiellonian University in Kraków
- Main interests: Slavic languages, general linguistics, linguistic typology

Tadeusz Milewski (17 May 1906 – 5 March 1966) was a Polish linguist and professor at the Jagiellonian University in Kraków, specializing in the study of the Slavic languages, general linguistics and linguistic typology.

== Education and career ==
Tadeusz Milewski was born in Kolomyia and studied linguistics at the University of Lviv, under the supervision of Tadeusz Lehr-Spławiński, from 1925 to 1929. His doctoral research was on the Polabian language. Together with his professor, he moved to the Jagiellonian University in Kraków in 1929 and took up a teaching position there.

Like other professors of the Jagiellonian University, he was arrested by the Gestapo on 6 November 1939 (as part of the Sonderaktion Krakau), and he spent a year in concentration camps in Sachsenhausen and Dachau. After his release, he participated in clandestine teaching in German-occupied Poland, and also started working on his book Outline of General Linguistics.

Milewski became a professor at the Jagiellonian University in 1946, and taught there in various roles until his death on 5 March 1966 in Kraków, after a long illness. The funeral was held by Archbishop Karol Wojtyła, a former student and longtime friend.

== Scientific contributions ==
Milewski is internationally best known for his contributions to linguistic typology, in particular his distinction between concentric and excentric language types, which is widely recognized as a precursor to the well-known distinction between head-marking and dependent-marking languages. He is also the originator of Milewski's typology. In addition to his interests in Slavic and Indo-European linguistics, he had a strong interest in the languages of North America.

== Selected works ==
- Milewski, Tadeusz. 1936. L’Indo-hittite et l’indo-européen. Cracovie: Imprimerie de l’Université.
- Milewski, Tadeusz. 1950. La structure de la phrase dans les langues indigènes de l'Amérique du Nord. Lingua Posnaniensis 2. 162–207.
- Milewski, Tadeusz. 1951. The conception of the word in languages of North American natives. Lingua Posnaniensis 3. 248–268.
- Milewski, Tadeusz. 1962. Wstęp do jezykoznawstwa. Łódź: Panstwowe Wydawnictwo Naukowe.
- Milewski, Tadeusz. 1964. Typological similarities between Caucasian and American Indian languages. Actas y Memorias (XXXV Congreso Internacional de Americanistas, Mexico 1962), vol. 2, 533–539. México, D.F.: Instituto Nacional de Antropología e Historia.
- Milewski, Tadeusz. 1965. Językoznawsto. Warszawa: Państwowe Wydawnictwo Naukowe.
- Milewski, Tadeusz. 1967. Études typologiques sur les langues indigènes de l’Amérique/Typological studies on the American Indian languages (Prace Komisji Orientalistycznej, 7.). Kraków: Polska Akademia Nauk.
- Milewski, Tadeusz. 1970. Voraussetzungen einer typologischen Sprachwissenschaft. Linguistics 8(59). 62–107.
- Milewski, Tadeusz. 1973. Introduction to the study of language. The Hague: Mouton. (= English translation of Milewski 1965)
