= Elizabeta Kančeska-Milevska =

Macedonian politician (born 1970)

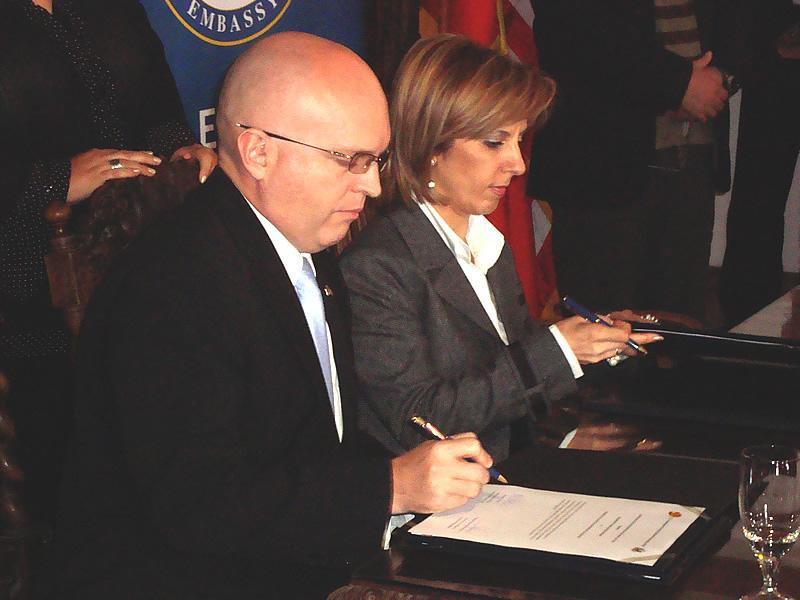
Elizabeta Kančeska-Milevska

Elizabeta Kančeska-Milevska (born 30 June 1970) is a Macedonian politician and former Minister of Culture in the Government of the Republic of Macedonia.

== Biography ==
Kančeska-Milevska was born in 1970 in Veles. In 1989 she finished Josip Broz Tito high school in Skopje.

In 1993 she graduated from the Faculty of Philosophy, Ss. Cyril and Methodius University of Skopje, Department of Sociology. In 2005, she finished her master's degree and in February 2012 defended her thesis on the European Cultural Model and Cultural-Integration Policy of the Republic of Macedonia.

She is a member of the VMRO-DPMNE party, and from 2008 to 2017 she was the Minister of Culture in the Government of the Republic of Macedonia. She speaks English and Greek. She is married and has a son.
