= Milewski's typology =

Language syntax classification

Milewski's typology is a language classification system proposed in the 1960s by the Polish linguist Tadeusz Milewski. In this classification active and tripartite languages were omitted because they were little known in the study of linguistics at that time.

Milewski proposed a division of languages into 6 groups, based upon consideration of 4 main syntactic relationships; these were:

- the relationship of the experiencer to the verb
- the relationship of the agent to the verb,
- the relationship of the patient to the verb,
- the relationship of the nominal attribute or predicate to the noun.

These criteria are interesting from a typological point of view because in many languages there is no difference between the sentence and the nominal phrase.

Milewski's typology can be employed to analyze languages with case marking but can also be used with those that use a fixed word order or a specific form of incorporation. For simplicity, the table below classifies casual languages in which the nominal attribute is marked with the genitive case.

| class | 1 | 2 | 3 | 4 | 5 | 6 |
|---|---|---|---|---|---|---|
| Experiencer to verb (Mary walks.) | a | a | a | a | a | a |
| Agent to verb (Mary sees John.) | a | b | a | b | a | b |
| Patient to verb (John sees Mary.) | b | a | b | a | b | a |
| Attribute to noun (Mary's dog sees John.) | c | c | b | b | a | a |

The letters a, b, and c represent formal inflective markers specific to each language. For instance, "a" always represents the formal marker that signifies the experiencer, called either the "nominative" or the "absolutive" depending upon whether this morpheme marks the agent of the action (as in nominative–accusative languages) or the patient (as in ergative–absolutive languages).

As the table shows:

1. In languages of the 1st class, the experiencer and the agent are marked with the nominative case (the "a" marker) while the patient is marked with the accusative case (the "b" marker).
  This class is the most widely spread. Most nominative–accusative languages belong here.
2. Languages of the 2nd class inflect differently. The experiencer is marked with the same morpheme as the patient while the agent is marked with a distinct morpheme. In contrast to Class 1 languages, the "a" marker represents the absolutive while the "b" marker denotes the ergative (in Class 1 languages, the "a" marker denotes the nominative and the "b" marker the accusative).
  Most ergative–absolutive languages belong here.
3. Languages of the 3rd class could belong to nominative–accusative languages, i.e., the nominative marks both the agent and the experiencer (the "a" marker). Class 3 languages do not, however, contain distinct markers/cases for the patient and nominal attributes, which together share the same marker, which denotes genitive (the "b" marker).
  Examples of languages of the 3rd class are Indonesian, Hopi, and Estonian. Marking the patient with the genitive is quite frequent in the Slavic languages even if the accusative is usually applied in them just as in other European languages.
4. Languages of the 4th class could be considered ergative–absolutive languages insofar as they make no distinction between the experiencer and the patient, marking both with the absolutive (the "a" marker). Yet languages of this class are contrary to typical ergative–absolutive languages insofar as they mark both agent and nominal attribute as genitive (ergative-genitive, the "b" marker).
  Examples of Class 4 languages are the Inuktitut, Salishan languages, and Mayan languages. They are ergative-absolutive languages that mark the ergative with the genitive case.
5. Languages of the 5th class use the genitive not only for the nominal attribute but also for the agent and the experiencer (the "a" marker). The other case, called the accusative, marks only the patient (the "b" marker).
  The only language of this class mentioned by Milewski is Nisga'a, a Tsimshianic language.
6. Languages of the 6th class use the genitive not only for the nominal attribute but also for the experiencer and the patient (the "a" marker"). The other case, the ergative, is used for the agent (the "b" marker).
  This group is not too numerous: Coast Tsimshian, Tunica and Guarani belong here. They are ergative-absolutive languages that mark the absolutive with the genitive case.
