= Pomeranian language =

Lechitic language

Pomeranian
- Middle Lechitic, Central Lechitic
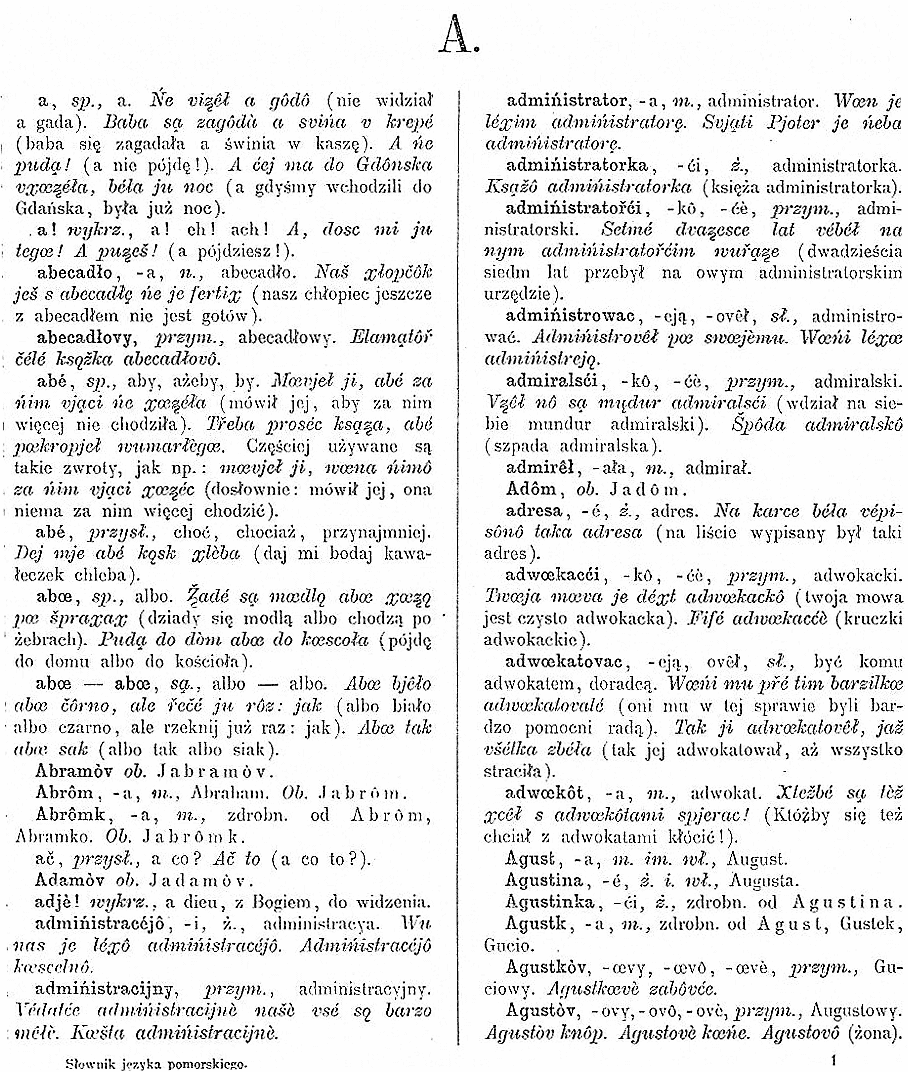
- Stefan Ramułt's Dictionary of the Pomeranian (Kashubian) language, published in Kraków, 1893
- Native to: Poland, Germany
- Region: Pomerania
- Language family: Indo-European: Balto-Slavic; Slavic; West Slavic; Lechitic; Pomeranian
- Dialects: Slovincian†; Kashubian; Western Pomeranian †

Language codes
- ISO 639-3: –

The Pomeranian language (Polish: pomorszczyzna or język pomorski; German: Pomoranisch or die pomoranische Sprache) is a Lechitic language within the West Slavic languages.

In medieval contexts, it refers to the dialects spoken by the Slavic Pomeranians. In modern contexts, the term is sometimes used synonymously with "Kashubian" and may also include extinct Slovincian.

The name Pomerania comes from Slavic po moře, which means "[land] by the sea".

== Ancient Pomeranian ==
During the early medieval Slavic migrations, the area between the Oder and Vistula rivers was settled by tribes grouped as Pomeranians. Their dialects, sometimes referred to as Ancient Pomeranian, had a transitory character between the Polabian dialects spoken west of Pomerania and the Old Polish dialects spoken to the southeast. The earliest text written in Pomerania comes from 1304, published in 1881-1882 in Pommerellisches Urkundenbuch.

Universis Christi fidelibus, ad quos presens scriptum pervenerit, Venzeke prawi curriwi sin de Solkowe, felicitatem in domino sempiternam

Universis Christi fidelibus, ad quos presens scriptum pervenerit, Więcek prawy kur[ri]wi syn de Sul[ech]owo, felicitatem in domino sempiternam.

— Pommerellisches Urkundenbuch, page 552

== Slovincian and Kashubian ==
During the High Middle Ages, German immigration and assimilation of the Slavic Pomeranians (Ostsiedlung) introduced Low German East Pomeranian, Central Pomeranian, and Mecklenburgisch-Vorpommersch dialects, which became dominant in Pomerania except for some areas in the east, where the populace remained largely Slavic and continued to use the Slavic Pomeranian language. This was especially the case in Pomerelia, where the Slavic population became known as Kashubians and their language accordingly as Kashubian. An insular Slavic Pomeranian dialect spoken northwest of Kashubia until the 20th century became known as Slovincian. It is disputed whether Slovincian may be regarded as a dialect of Kashubian or a separate language. Likewise, it is disputed whether Kashubian may be regarded as a dialect of Polish or a separate language. Stefan Ramułt (1859–1913) was fascinated by Florian Ceynowa and decidedly supported giving Kashubian the status of a full-fledged standard language.

== Influence on other dialects ==
The Pomeranian language influenced the formation of other Polish language dialects, such as the Kociewski, Borowiacki and Krajniacki dialects. Undoubtedly, they belong to the Polish language, but they also have some features in common with the Pomeranian language, which proves their character was transitional.

Friedrich Lorentz supposed that the Kociewski and Borewiacki dialects first belonged to the Pomeranian language and were then Polonized as a result of the Polish colonization of these territories. According to Lorentz, the Krajniacki dialect most probably was originally a part of the Polish language.

The common feature of the Kociewski dialects and the Kashubian language is, for example, the partial preservation of the so-called "TarT" group and a part of its lexis. For the Borowiacki dialects and the Pomeranian language, the common feature was affrication of dorsal consonants.

The Pomeranian language also influenced the Low German dialects, which were used in Pomerania. After Germanisation, the population of Western Pomerania started to use the Low German dialects. Those dialects, though, were influenced by the Pomeranian language (Slavic). Most words originating from Pomeranian can be found in vocabulary connected with fishery and farming. The word Zeese / Zehse may serve as an example. It describes a kind of a fishing net and is still known in the Low German dialects of Mecklenburg-Vorpommern today. The word comes from the old Pomeranian word of the same meaning: seza. It moved to Kashubian and Slovincian dialects through Low German, and appeared in Pomeranian dictionaries as ceza meaning "flounder and perch fishing net". Thus, it is a "reverse loan-word" as the Pomeranian language borrowed the word from Low German in which it functioned as a "Pomoranism" (a borrowing from the Pomeranian language).

A borrowing from the Pomeranian language which has been used in everyday German language and has appeared in dictionaries is the phrase "dalli, dalli" (it means: come on, come on). It moved to the German language through the German dialects of West Prussia, and is also present in the Kashubian language (spelled: dali, dali).

== Assessment ==
The classification of the Pomeranian ethnolect is problematic. It was classified by Aleksander Brückner as one of the Old Polish dialects. At the same time, he classified the extant Kashubian and Slovincian dialects as belonging to the Modern Polish language. Other linguists relate the Pomeranian language to the Polabian group of dialects (forming the Pomeranian-Polabian group).

After Slovincian and all the Pomeranian dialects (except Kashubian) became extinct, the Kashubian language is the term most often used in relation to the language spoken by the Pomeranians. However, it is still not clear from where the words "Kashubians" and "Kashubian" (Polish: Kaszubi and Kaszubski, Kashubian: Kaszëbi and kaszëbsczi) originated and how they were brought from the area near Koszalin to Pomerelia. None of the theories proposed has been widely accepted so far. There is also no indication that Pomeranians wandered from the area of Koszalin to Pomerelia.

While Western Pomerania was being Germanized, the Germans (both colonizers and Germanized descendants of Slavic Pomeranians) started using the words "Pomeranian" (German: Pommersch; Polish: pomorski) and "Pomeranians" (German: Pommern; Polish: Pomorzacy) referring to their own population. The part of the Pomeranian population which kept their Slavic language was called the Wends (German: Wenden) or the Kashubians (German: Kaschuben). As the West lost its Slavic character, those two terms were more often used in the East. In 1850, in the preface to his Kashubian-Russian dictionary, Florian Ceynowa wrote about the language of Baltic Slavic peoples: "Usually it is called the 'Kashubian language', although the 'Pomeranian-Slovenian dialect' would be a more proper term."

The word dialect was probably used by Ceynowa because he was a follower of Pan-Slavism, according to which all the Slavic languages were dialects of one Slavic language. In his later works, though, he called his language kaszébsko-słovjinsko móva.

In 1893, Stefan Ramułt, the Jagiellonian University linguist, referred to the early history of Pomerania, publishing the Dictionary of the Pomoranian i.e. Kashubian Language. In the preface, Ramułt wrote:

As Kashubians are the direct descendants of Pomeranians, it is right to use the words Pomeranian and Kashubian as synonyms. Especially as there are other reasons for it as well...

and

Kashubians and Slavs are what remains of the once powerful Pomeranian tribe and they are the only inheritors of the name Pomeranians.

Friedrich Lorentz (the author of Pomeranian Grammar and The History of Pomeranian/Kashubian Language) referred in his works to Ramułt's dictionary. After Lorentz died, Friedhelm Hinze published a Pomeranian dictionary in five volumes (Pomoranisches Wörterbuch), which was based on Lorentz's writing.

=== Modern status of Kashubian ===
The Pomeranian language, and its only surviving form, Kashubian, traditionally have not been recognized by the majority of Polish linguists, and have been treated in Poland as "the most distinct dialect of Polish". However, there have also been some Polish linguists who treated Pomeranian as a separate language. The most prominent of them were Stefan Ramułt, and Alfred Majewicz, who overtly called Kashubian a language in the 1980s.

Following the collapse of communism in Poland, attitudes on the status of Kashubian have been gradually changing. It is increasingly seen as a fully-fledged language, as it is taught in state schools and has some limited usage on public radio and television. A bill passed by the Polish parliament in 2005 recognizes it as a regional language in the Republic of Poland and provides for its use in official contexts in 10 communes where its speakers constitute at least 20% of the population.

== See also ==
- East Pomeranian
- Kashubian-Pomeranian Association
- Jerzy Treder
