= Tadeusz Lehr-Spławiński =

Polish linguist (1891–1965)

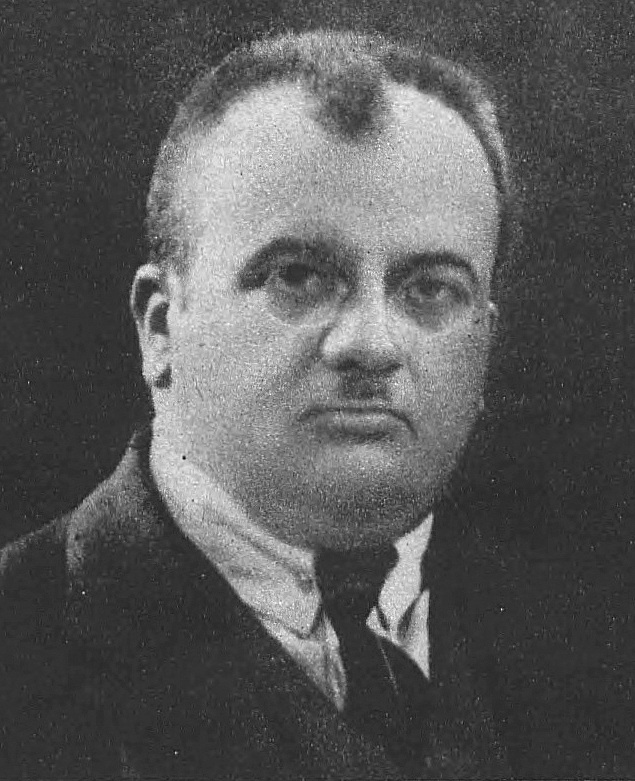
- Born: 20 September 1891; Kraków
- Died: 17 February 1965 (aged 73); Kraków
- Writing career
- Notable works: O pochodzeniu i praojczyźnie Słowian (On the origin and early homeland of the Slavs)

Tadeusz Lehr-Spławiński (September 20, 1891 – February 17, 1965) was a Polish linguist, scholar, and professor of Slavonic studies. He was twice elected rector of the Jagiellonian University in Kraków before and after the Nazi German occupation of Poland.

== Biography ==
Lehr-Spławiński was born in Kraków, the son of Edward Lehr, an engineer, and Maria née Spławińska. He went to Jan III Sobieski high school and, in the years 1909–1915 studied linguistics, history of Polish literature as well as classical philology, at the Jagiellonian University in Kraków. He continued his studies in Vienna, and began his teaching career in Zakopane.

In 1918 (following Poland's return to independence), Lehr-Spławiński became professor at Poznań University and, from 1922, the University of Lwów, at both of which he led the Department of Slavonic Philology. From 1929 until his retirement in 1962, he was professor of linguistics at Jagiellonian University, elected as its Rector for the first time just prior to the Nazi German invasion of Poland. Among his students in October 1938 was the 18-year-old Karol Wojtyła, the future Pope John Paul II.

=== World War II ===
On November 6, 1939, during the Sonderaktion Krakau, Lehr-Spławiński was arrested and interned by the Gestapo on the order of SS-Obersturmbannführer Bruno Müller; along with 184 professors and academics from three different universities in Kraków. It was part of a much broader assault on Polish cultural elite known as Intelligenzaktion. The prisoners were transported first to jail at Montelupich street and – some three days later – to the detention center in Breslau, where they spent 18 days in prison facilities. The Breslau Gestapo were unprepared for such a large transfer of prisoners and awaited permission to send them to the Buchenwald concentration camp. As the camp was filled to capacity, on the evening of November 27, 1939, they were loaded on a train to the Sachsenhausen concentration camp located outside of Berlin.

Lehr-Spławiński was among a group of Kraków academics released from custody in February 1940 as a result of an international protest involving prominent Italians including Benito Mussolini and the Vatican. Following his release, he participated in clandestine teaching during the occupation period. In 1945, after the liberation of Kraków, he again became the rector of Jagiellonian University and served until 1946. He was head of Slavonic Institute of the Polish Academy of Sciences, and Doctor honoris causa at Charles University in Prague and the Sofia University.

Lehr-Spławiński was married and had two sons, Andrzej and Wojciech and a daughter, Barbara. He died on February 17, 1965, in Kraków, and is buried at the historic Rakowicki Cemetery. A street in Kraków is named after him.

== Works ==
Lehr-Spławiński is the author of over 400 publications in the field of linguistics and its history, etymology, Saussure's Law, as well as culture and education. He wrote dictionaries and university textbooks. Popular works by Lehr-Spławiński include:

- Kaszubi: kultura ludowa i język (translated as The Cassubian civilization by Friedrich Lorentz), 2 editions, 1935
- O pochodzeniu i praojczyźnie Słowian (On the origin and early homeland of the Slavs), 1946, Polish
- Język polski; pochodzenie, powstanie, rozwój, 6 editions between 1947 and 1978, Polish, English
- Przegląd i charakterystyka języków słowiańskich, 8 editions between 1954 and 1994, Polish
- Rozprawy i szkice z dziejów kultury Słowian, 1954
- Dzieje języka ukraińskiego w zarysie, 3 editions, 1956, Polish
- Wybór tekstów do historii języka rosyjskiego, 2 editions between 1965 and 1981, Russian, Polish
- Zarys gramatyki języka staro-cerkiewno-słowiańskíego na tle porównawczym, 1965
- Gramatyka historyczna języka czeskiego, in Polish, 1957
- O mowie Polaków w Galicji Wschodniej (On the Polish language in Eastern Galicia)
- Słownik etymologiczny języka Drzewian połabskich, 3 editions, 1981, multiple languages
