= Polabian language =

Extinct and revitalized Slavic language

Polabian
- Slüvensťă rec / Vensťĕ
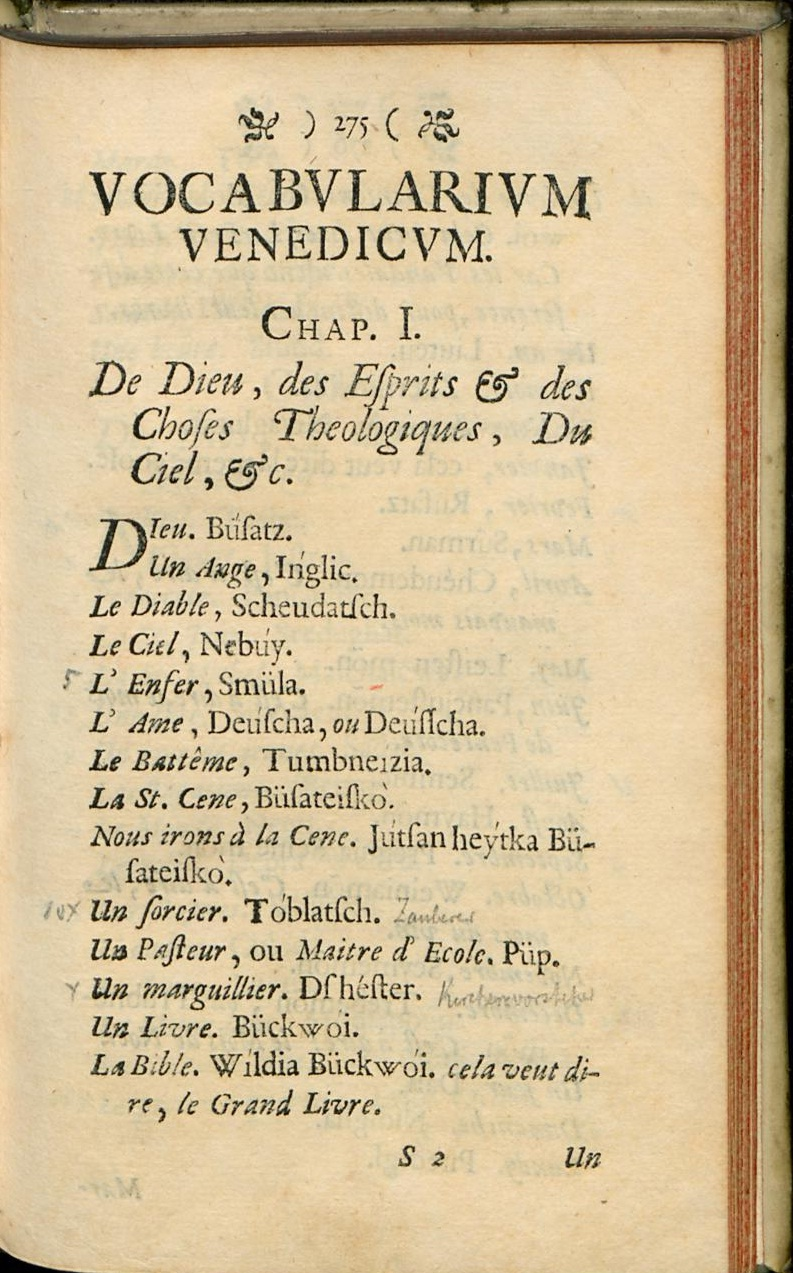
- The first page of Vocabularium Venedicum
- Pronunciation: /slyˈvɛˑn.stʲɐ rɛt͡s/
- Native to: Germany
- Ethnicity: Polabian Slavs
- Extinct: 3 October 1756, with the death of Emerentz Schultze
- Revival: 21st century; ≥5 known L2 speakers
- Language family: Indo-European: Balto-Slavic; Slavic; West Slavic; Lechitic; West Lechitic; Polabian
- Writing system: Latin script

Language codes
- ISO 639-3: pox
- Glottolog: pola1255
- Linguasphere: 53-AAA-bc
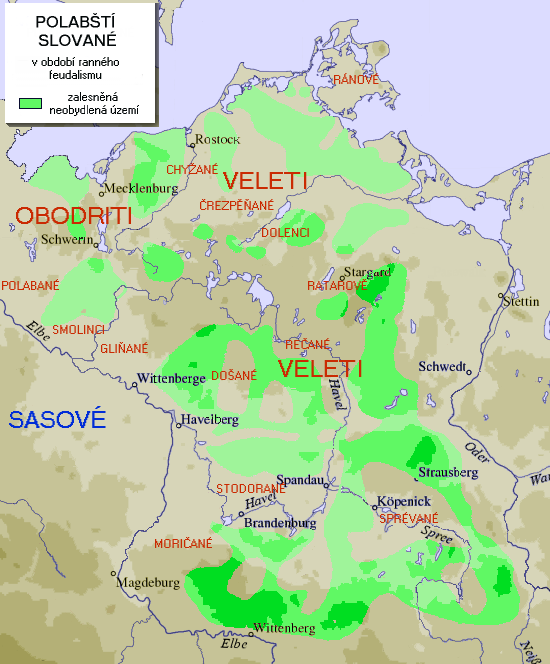
- Grey: Former settlement area of the Polabian Slavs. Green: Uninhabited forest areas. Darker shade just indicates higher elevation.

The Polabian language, (Note: Polabian: slüvensťă rec, venskă rec, slüv́onsťĕ, slüvensťĕ, vensťĕ; literally: Slavic language; German: Polabische Sprache, Polabisch; Lower Sorbian: połobšćina, połobska rěc; Upper Sorbian: połobšćina, połobska rěč; Polish: język połabski; Czech: polabština; Latin: lingua Polabica) also known as the Drevanian–Polabian language, (Note: German: Draväno-Polabische Sprache, Dravänopolabisch; Lower Sorbian: drjewjanopołobšćina, drjewjanopołobska rěc; Upper Sorbian: drjewjanopołobšćina, drjewjanopołobska rěč; Polish: język drzewiańsko-połabski; Czech: drevansko-polabský jazyk; Latin: lingua Dravaeno-Polabica, lingua Dravaenopolabica) Drevanian language, (Note: German: Drevanische Sprache, Drevanisch; Lower Sorbian: drjewjańšćina, drjewjańska rěc; Upper Sorbian: drjewjanšćina, drjewjanski rěč; Polish: język drzewiański; Czech: drevjanština; Latin: lingua Dravaenica) and Lüneburg Wendish language, (Note: German: Lüneburgisch-Wendische Sprache, Lüneburgischen Wendischen) is a West Slavic language that was spoken by the Polabian Slavs (German: Wenden) in present-day northeastern Germany around the Elbe, from which comes the term Polabian. It was spoken approximately until the rise to power of Prussia in the mid-18th century – when it was superseded by Low German – in the areas of Mecklenburg-West Pomerania, central Mittelmark part of Brandenburg and eastern Saxony-Anhalt (Wittenberg originally part of Bela Serbia), as well as in eastern parts of Wendland (Lower Saxony) and Schleswig-Holstein, Ostholstein and Lauenburg). Polabian was also relatively long (until the 16th century) spoken in and around the cities of Lübeck and Oldenburg. The very poorly attested Slavic dialects of Rügen seemed to have had more in common with Polabian than with Pomeranian varieties. In the south, it bordered on the Sorbian language area in Lusatia.

Polabian is characterized by the preservation of a number of archaic features, such as the presence of nasal vowels, a lack of metathesis of Proto-Slavic *TorT; the presence of an aorist and imperfect verb tenses, traces of the dual number, and some prosodic features, as well as by some innovations, including diphthongization of closed vowels, a shift of the vowels o to ö, ü and a to o; a softening of the consonants g, k in some positions to d', t', an occasional reduction of final vowels, and the formation of complex tenses, many which are associated with the influence of the German language. Polabian also has a large number of Middle Low German borrowings.

By the 18th century, Lechitic Polabian was in some respects markedly different from other Slavic languages, most notably in having a strong German influence. It was close to Pomeranian and Kashubian, and is attested only in a handful of manuscripts, dictionaries and various writings from the 17th and 18th centuries.

== History ==
About 2800 Polabian words are known; of prose writings only a few prayers, one wedding song and a few folktales survive. Immediately before the language became extinct, several people started to collect phrases and compile wordlists, and were engaged with folklore of the Polabian Slavs, but only one of them appears to have been a native speaker of Polabian (himself leaving only 13 pages of linguistically relevant material from a 310-page manuscript). The last native speaker of Polabian, a woman, died in 1756, and the last person who spoke limited Polabian died in 1825.

The most important monument of the language is the so-called Vocabularium Venedicum (1679–1719) by Christian Hennig von Jessen.

The language left many traces to this day in toponymy; for example, Wustrow (literally 'island', Polabian: Våstrüv), Lüchow (Polabian: Ljauchüw), Sagard, Gartow, Krakow etc. It is also a likely origin of the name Berlin, from the Polabian stem berl-/birl- ('swamp').

Though unorganized language revitalization for the Polabian language is occurring in small groups, as of 2023, the language has few limited speakers, but is growing due to more resources being accessible to learn the language.

== Features ==
Polabian retains some archaic features from Proto-Slavic:

- Preservation of the nasal vowels [ǫ], [ą], [ę]: *pętь > pąt
- Preservation of the aorist and imperfect in the conjugation system
- Trace preservation of the dual number
- Absence of metathesis of *TorT

Polabian also has many innovations, in part due to neighboring German and in part due to being more remote:

- Diphthongization of monophthongs
- Formation of complex, periphrastic tenses
- Restructuring of the case system

The Proto-Slavic vowels developed thusly:

- Unlike most other Slavic languages, the weak yers ъ and ь were not lost not only before a syllable with another reduced yer (Proto-Slavic *mъхъ > måx), but also in initial stressed and pre-stressed syllables: *dъno > dånü “bottom” ", *sъpati > såpot "sleep", *tъkati > tåkat "weave", *tьma > tåmă "darkness", *pьsi > pasaɪ̯ "dogs". A. M. Selishchev notes similar phenomena in the dialects of the Bulgarian, Serbian, Slovenian and Slovak languages. In positions before a hard consonant, *ь in Polabian shifted to å (*pьsъ > ṕås “dog”), in other positions to a (*dьnь > dan “day”) and only in some cases between soft consonants to i (*vьši > visi "All"). *ъ usually gave å (*vъšь > vås “louse”), but after velars (*k, g, x) it turned into ė (*olkъtь > lüťėt “elbow”, *nogъtь > nüďėt “(finger/toe)nail”, *xъmelь > x́ėmil “hop”).
- Reduced vowels arose in Polabian as a result of stress. In unstressed syllables, the vowels *a, *ě, *ъ, and *ь reduced to ă, and the vowels *i, *y, *u, *o, *e reduced to ĕ.
- The vowel *o became ö before a hard consonant (*kosa > ťösa, *kolo > ťölü) and å after v before a hard consonant (*oko > våťü, *voda > våda), in ü in other positions (*sobota > süböta, *noga > nüga).
- The vowels *i, *y, and *u in Polabian were diphthongized in stressed and pre-stressed syllables: *zima > zai̯mă, *nitь > nai̯t, *byti > båi̯t, *dymъ > dåi̯m, *duša > daṷsă, *ubĕžati > ai̯bezăt, *jutrě > jaṷtră, jai̯tră.
- In the same position, a became o : *žaba > zobo, *korva > korvo.
- The vowel *ě before hard dental consonants turned into o with a softening of the preceding consonant (*lěto > ľotü), before j it turned into i (*sějanьje > sijonă), in other cases - into e (*běliti > belĕt).

The Proto-Slavic consonants developed thusly:

- The sibilant consonants *č, *š, *ž in Polabian underwent masuration, changing into c, s, z, which, unlike the original c, s, z, were always hard. T. Lehr-Spławiński, based on relative chronological data, originally dated the appearance of masuration in the Polabian language no earlier than the beginning of the 16th century, and that this phenomenon must be a Polabian innovation, and it cannot be explained by the influence of the German language, which has č and š. A. M. Selishchev dated this process to the 16th-17th centuries, believing that it did not take place in all Polabian dialects, as a few documents have examples with these sibilants, despite the predominance of masurized forms, and associated it with the influence of the Low Saxon and East Low German dialects of German settlers, in which š is missing. Later it was proven that in the dialect presented in the Pfeffinger dictionary, masuration was absent and for it is necessary to reconstruct sibilants (š, ž, č), absent in other dialects.
- The back-lingual consonants *k, *g, and *x before the front vowels i (< *y), ė (< *ъ) ü and ö (< *o) softened to ḱ, ǵ, x́. Subsequently, ḱ and ǵ became ť and ď respectively.

== Phonology ==
For Polabian the following segments are reconstructable:

=== Vowels ===
Polabian vowels
	Front	Central	Back
Close	i y		u
Close-mid	e		
Open-mid	ɛ œ	ə	ɔ ɔ̃
Near-open		ɐ	
Open		a ã	ɒ

Polabian diphthongs
Diphthongs	ai	ɒi	oi	au	ɒu

=== Consonants ===
Polabian consonant segments
	Labial		Dental	Alveolar		Palatal	Post- palatal	Velar
Plosives	p	pʲ	t̪			tʲ		k
Plosives	b	bʲ	d̪			dʲ		ɡ
Affricates			t̪͡s̪			t͡sʲ		
Affricates			d̪͡z̪			d͡zʲ		
Fricatives	f		s̪	ʃ		sʲ	xʲ	x
Fricatives	v	vʲ	z̪			zʲ		
Nasals	m	mʲ	n̪			nʲ		
Laterals				l	lʲ			
Trills				r	rʲ			
Semi-vowel						j		

=== Prosody ===
The nature of the Polabian accent remains a controversial issue. There are three theories:

- Free stress, supported by A. Schleicher, T. Lehr-Spławiński, and A. M. Selishchev.
- Stress was always initial, i.e. always occurring on the first syllable, supported by E. Kurilovich.
- Final stress if the final vowel was long, and pentulimate stress if the final vowel was short, supported by N. S. Trubetskoy and R. Olesh. K. Polański criticizes this theory asserting that there was not long-short distinction in Polabian, but rather strong-weak.

== Morphology ==
Due to the poor attestation of Polabian, it is difficult to reconstruct a full morphology. Presented here is a general overview.

=== Nouns ===
As in all Slavic languages, Polabian has three grammatical genders: masculine, feminine and neuter. Polabian nouns may also be animate or inanimate, and decline for six cases: nominative, genitive, dative, accusative, instrumental and the prepositional; the vocative case in Polabian was lost, being replaced by the nominative. Nouns were used mainly only in combination with prepositions, not only in the prepositional case, as in most Slavic languages, but also in the instrumental. Within the inflectional endings, two paradigms exist, one of a masculine-neuter type, the other a feminine type; neither inflectional types are homogeneous.

==== Masculine and neuter nouns ====
Masculine and neuter nouns are divided into two groups: those ending in -ă in the nominative singular and those ending in anything else. Nouns ending in -ă probably took a feminine declension in the singular, as in other Slavic languages, but this is difficult to assert due to the fact that such nouns are known in the documents only in the nominative singular form. The second group of nouns is divided into a number of subtypes. The dual forms of masculine and neuter nouns are not attested.

Within the singular, the following can be seen:

- Masculine nouns in the nominative are characterized by zero endings: dåzd (“rain”), in addition, forms with the ending -ă are preserved : l̥ol̥ă (“father”), vau̯jă (“uncle”), and one form with the ending -åi̯: komåi̯ (“stone”). In the neuter gender, there are groups of nouns with endings -ü: l̥otü (“summer”, “year”), -i: püli (“field”), -ĕ: gńozdĕ (“nest”) and -ą/-ă: jai̯mą/jai̯mă (“name”).
- The masculine genitive singular endings are -o and -ă: bügo (“god”), zai̯våtă (“life”, “belly”), -au̯/-åi̯ or -ĕ: sned'au̯ (“snow”), pelåi̯nĕ (“wormwood”). The genitive singular neuter endings -o or -ă: pöl l̥oto (“six months”), mlåkă (“milk”), vai̯nă (“wine”).
- Masculine and neuter nouns in the dative case end in -au̯, -ai̯, and -ĕ: büd'au̯ (“to God”), kå bezońĕ (“to run”). The first two endings differ by dialects, the third (reduced), unlike the first two, depends on the place of stress in the word. T. Ler-Splavinsky and some other scholars interpreted the endings -aw, -af, and -âw as the ending of the masculine dative case -åvĕ (from *-ovi), the authors of modern works on the Polabian language (K. Polyansky and others) are inclined to see the diphthong -au̯ in these endings.
- Animate masculine nouns in the accusative are syncretic with the genitive case, and for inanimate masculine nouns and all neuter nouns, the accusative is syncretic with the nominative case.
- Masculine and neuter nouns in the instrumental singularend in -åm: prid gordåm (“before the court”), prid l̥otåm (“before a year”).
- Most masculine and neuter nouns in the locative singular end in -e or -ă: vå хlăde (“in the shadow”), vå vetră (“in the wind”. Velar consonants show alternation in this case: dek (“roof”)||no decă (“on the roof”), krig (“war”)||no kriʒe (“at war”). Masculine nouns whose stems end in a soft consonant take the ending -ĕ: no pǫt'ĕ (“on the way/path”), no våtåi̯ńĕ (“on the fence”). A number of neuter nouns are characterized by the ending -ai̯: no mărai̯ (“at the sea”), vå pülai̯ (“in the field”).

Within the plural, the following can be seen:

- Nouns in the nominative plural are characterized by a wide variety of endings: -ai̯/-ĕ, -e, -üvĕ, -i, -åi̯/-ĕ, and -ă - lesai̯ (“forests”), ṕåsĕ/pasai̯ (“dogs”), nüze (“knives”), polcă (“fingers”). Since the nominative and accusative plural are syncretic, it is sometimes difficult or impossible to tell which case is attested in texts.
- The masculine genitive plural is characterized by endings -Ø and -üv: ai̯ dåvüх gråi̯k (“at two pears”), cai̯stĕ priz grех́üv (“pure (free) from sins”). Neuter nouns only take the ending -Ø.
- Only one example of the dative plural of masculine nouns is attested, formed with the ending -üm: gresnărüm ("sinners").

Case	Singular	
Case	Masculine	Neuter
Nominative	-Ø, -ă, -åi̯	-ü, -i : -ĕ, -ą : -ă
Genitive	-o : -ă, -au̯ : -åi̯	-o : -ă
Dative	-au̯ : -ai̯ : -ĕ	
Accusative	= nom (inanimate) or gen (animate)	
Instrumental	-åm	
Prepositional	-e : -ă, -ai̯	

Case	Plural	
Case	Masculine	Neuter
Nominative	-ai̯ : -åi̯, -ĕ, -e, -üvĕ, -i	-a
Genitive	-üv : -ev, -Ø	-Ø
Dative	-üm	–
Accusative	= nom (inanimate) or gen (animate)	
Instrumental	-ĕ	–
Prepositional	–	-åх

==== Feminine nouns ====
There are three types of declension of feminine nouns. The first includes nouns with endings -o or -ă in the nominative singular case: bobo (“woman”), zenă (“wife”, “woman”). The second ends in -åi̯, -ĕ, or -ai̯: motai̯ (“mother”), bant'åi̯ (“bench”). The third has a zero ending: vås (“louse”), t’üst (“bone”), vas (“village”).

Within the singular, the following can be seen:

- Feminine nouns in the nominative singular end in -o/-ă (the reduced vowel -ă is marked in an unstressed position), or -åi̯/-ĕ (the presence of a full or reduced form also depends on the place of stress in the word), -ai̯ (except motai̯ ( “mother”) all words with this ending in Polabian are borrowings from Middle Low German) and -Ø (null morpheme).
- Feminine nouns in the genitive singular are characterized by the endings -ai̯/-ĕ (for nouns with endings -o/-ă in the nominative case): slåmåi̯ (“straw”), pöl t'üpĕ (“half a pile”, “thirty”); -ă/ai̯ zimă (“near the ground”), viz viză (“from the house”), there are no examples with a full vowel in the ending for this group of nouns; -i (for nouns ending with a consonant in the nominative case): råzi (“rye”), süli (“salt”); -vĕ (only one example of a noun form with this ending has been preserved): ai̯ kokvĕ (“at the pillory”).
- Feminine nouns in the dative singular take the ending -e/-ă: kå stărne (“on the side”, “to the side”) and -ai̯: kå zimai̯ (“to the ground”).
- Feminine nouns in the accusative singular end in -ǫ: korvǫ (“cow”); -ą/-ă: no zimą (“on the ground”), zo nidelă (“per week”); and -Ø (for nouns ending in consonant in the nominative case): t'üst (“bone”), vas (“village”).
- Feminine nouns in the instrumental singular only have one ending, -ą: så lüdą (“by boat”), püd zimą (“underground”), så pąstą (“fist”).
- Feminine nouns in the prepositional singular have endings -ă: vå vidă (“in the water”); and -ĕ: no storně (“on the side”), no zimĕ (“on the ground”), vå vizĕ (“in the house”).

Within the plural, the following can be seen:

- Feminine nouns in the nominative and accusative plural are syncretic and take the endings -åi̯: sestråi̯ (“sisters”); -e/-ă: vüce (“sheep”), nidelă (“weeks”); -ai̯/-ĕ: golǫzai̯ (“branches”), t’üstai̯/t’üstĕ (“bones”); and -våi̯: grai̯svåi̯ (“pears”).

Within the dual, the following can be seen:

- Feminine nouns in the nominative and accusative dual are syncretic and take the ending -e: rǫce ("two hands/arms"), nüʒe ("two feet/legs").
- Feminine nouns in the genitive dual are syncretic with the genitive plural: ai̯ dåvüх grau̯k (“at two pears”).
- Feminine nouns in the dative and instrumental dual are syncretic and are characterized by the ending -omă, only one such noun form is attested: så rǫkomă (“with two hands”).

Case	Singular
Nominative	-o : -ă, -åi̯, -Ø, -ai̯
Genitive	-åi̯ : -ĕ, -ă, -i, -vĕ
Dative	-e : -ă, -ai̯
Accusative	-ǫ, -ą : -ă, -Ø
Instrumental	-ǫ, -ą : -ă
Prepositional	-e : -ă, -ĕ

Case	Plural	Dual
Nominative	-åi̯: -ĕ, -ai̯ : -ĕ, -e : -ă, -våi̯	-e
Genitive	-Ø	–
Dative	-ăm	-omă
Accusative	= nom	
Instrumental	-omĕ	-omă
Prepositional	–	

=== Adjectives ===
Adjectives agree in gender, case and number. A few instances of short adjectives are attested. Adjectives can also inflect for the comparative and superlative.

The following adjectival inflections are attested:

Case	Singular		
Case	Masculine	Neuter	Feminine
Nominative	-ĕ	-ă : -ĕ	-ă
Genitive	-ĕg		–
Dative	-ümĕ		-ĕ
Accusative	-ĕg (animate), -ĕ (inanimate)	-ă : -ĕ	-ǫ
Prepositional	–		-ăj

Case	Plural		
Case	Masculine	Neuter	Feminine
Nominative	-ĕ	-ă	-ă
Genitive	-ĕх	-ĕх	-ĕх
Dative	–	–	–
Accusative	-ĕ, -ĕх	-ă	–
Locative	–	–	–

Short forms of adjectives are formed from the stems of full adjectives and by adding gender endings in the singular. These forms agrees with the noun to which it refers in case as well:

Gender	Ending	Examples of short adjectives
Masculine	-Ø	cai̯st (“clean”), stor (“old”), krosan (“good”, “beautiful”), dolĕk (“far”), sarĕk (“wide”), glǫbĕk (“deep”)
Feminine	-o	nüvo (“new”), storo (“old”)
Neuter	-ü	cai̯stü (“clean”), l’ått’ü (“light”), nai̯st’ü (“low”), mükrü (“wet”), teplü (“warm”), sau̯х́ü (“dry”)

Among the surviving masculine and neuter forms, the instrumental case (tai̯xåm (“quiet”)) and the locative case (cai̯ste (“pure”); dübre (“good”)) are attested.

The comparative of adjectives is formed with -i̯sĕ, -sĕ, and -ésĕ, and the superlative is formed from the comparative by adding na-: navoi̯sĕ (“highest”), lepsĕ (“better”), zai̯mnésǎ (“colder”), nastăresĕ (“eldest”).

=== Numerals ===
Polabian has both cardinal and ordinal numerals, and a few attestations of collective numerals exist:

	Cardinal	Ordinal	Collective
1	jadån, *janĕ, janü	pară	
2	dåvo, dåvoi̯, dåve	törĕ	
3	tåri, tåroi̯	tritĕ	
4	citĕr	citjortĕ	citvărü
5	pąt	ṕǫtĕ	pątărü
6	sist	sistĕ	sistărü
7	sidĕm		sidmărü
8	visĕm	våsmĕ	vismărü
9	divąt	div́ǫtĕ	divątărü
10	disąt	diśǫtĕ	disątărü
11	jadånădist / janădist / janünăctü		
12	dvenăcti / dvenăcte, dvenădist		
13	trai̯nocte / trai̯nădist		
14	citĕrnocti / citĕrnocte, citĕrnădist		
15	pątnocti, pątnădist		
16	sistnocti, sistnădist		
17	sidĕmnocti, sidĕmnădist		
18	visĕmnocti, visĕmnădist		
19	divątnocti, divątnădist		
20	disątnocti		
40	citĕrdiśǫt		
50	pą(t)diśǫt		
60	sis(t)diśǫt		
70	sidĕmdiśǫt		
80	visĕmdiśǫt		
90	divątdiśǫt		

The endings for -cte / -cti and -dist 11-19 originates from to Proto-Slavic *desęte (prepositional of desętе “ten”). The multiple endings are the result of different placements of stress within the numeral, which is motivated by Polabian processes of stress movement.

The numeral thirty is attested only by the construction pöl ťüpĕ, (“half a pile”), and sixty is attested only as ťüpă (“pile”).

The original word for hundred (Proto-Slavic *sъto) was not preserved; instead it was replaced by disą(t)diśǫt, literally, “ten tens,” or pąt stíďə, where stíďə is a borrowing from the Middle German stige (“twenty, two tens”). The remaining terms for hundreds are unattested. The original term for thousand (Proto-Slavic *tysǫti) was replaced by the construction disąt pątstiďə.

=== Pronouns ===
The following personal and reflexive pronouns are attested:

Singular	1st person		2nd person		reflexive	3rd person (masc.)	3rd person (fem.)
Singular	Full form	Clitic	Full form	Clitic			
Nominative	joz, jo		toi̯, tåi̯			vån	vånǎ
Genitive	mině, mane, maně		tibĕ, tibe		sibĕ	jig, jĕg	
Dative	mině, maně, mane	-mə, -m	tíbĕ, tibé, tĕ		sĕbe	jim, mĕ	
Accusative	mině, mane, mą, mě		tíbĕ, tĕbé, tą, tĕ			jig, jĕg, nĕg	
Instrumental	manǫ		tǎbǫ			nĕm	

Plural	1st person	2nd person	3rd person
Nominative	moi̯	vinái̯	jai̯
Genitive	nos, năs		
Dative	nom, năm	vom	jai̯m
Accusative	nos, năs		
Instrumental	nómĕ	vomĕ	

The pronoun jai̯ was borrowed from Middle Low German jī.

There were two demonstrative pronouns in Polabian: sǫ, so, sü (“this”) and tǫ, to, tü (“that”).

The attested possessive pronouns are: müj, müjă, müji (“mine”); tüj, tüjă, tüji (“yours (singular)”); süji ("one's own (reflexive possessive pronoun"); nos ("our"); vosă (“yours” (plural)).

The interrogative pronouns are: kåtü (“who”); cü (“what”); koťĕ (“which”, “what”, “what kind”).

The determinative pronouns are: vis (“all”), visoťă (“anything”), kozdümĕ (“everyone” (dative)).

The negative pronouns are: nĕkătü (“nobody”), nic (“nothing”), nijadån (“not one, no”), niťidĕ (“nowhere”); all were formed using the prefix nĕ-/ni-, which phonetically cannot continue the Proto-Slavic *ni-, which would have developed as *nai-. K. Polański believed that nai- was supplanted by ni- under the influence of the negative particle ni (“not”).

=== Verbs ===
As with other inflections, complete verb paradigms cannot be reconstructed due to a lack of attestation. Below is a general overview.

==== Aspect ====
Verbs may be either perfective or imperfective in aspect, expressed by different structures of the verb stem: zarăt (imperfective) and vizrăt (perfective) (“look, see”); dvai̯zĕ (imperfective) and dvai̯gnǫt (perfective) (“to move”); våzdet-să (imperfective) and våzdevot-să (perfective) (“to dress”).

==== Tense ====
Polabian verbs may inflect for present tense, future tense and three forms of the past tense: imperfect, aorist, as well as two perfect tenses, called perfect I and perfect II.

The stress in present tense verbs always falls on the penultimate syllable, with the exception of verbs with enclitics, in which the stress goes to the last syllable. This type of stress explains the presence of conjugations formed with -ĕ-||-i- (from *-e- ) and with -o-||-ă- (from *-a(je)-). The alternation in the verbs of these conjugations of full vowels and reduced vowels depends both on the presence or absence of enclitics, and on the presence of consonants or whole syllables after the vowel. The differences in the types of conjugations concern only the forms of the 1st person singular.

Person	Present conjugation type I (-ĕ- : -i-)		
Person	singular	plural	dual
First person	-ą	-mĕ	–
Second person	-s	-tĕ	–
Third person	-Ø	-ą	-tă : -to

Person	Present conjugation type II (-o- : -ă-)		
Person	Singular	Plural	Dual
First person	-m	-mĕ	–
Second person	-s	-tĕ	–
Third person	-Ø	-ą	-tă : -to

The future tense is formed by adding the auxiliary verb cą (“I want”) to the infinitive of the main verb of the present tense form: ci sneg ai̯t (“it will snow”), vån ci-să sḿot (“he will laugh”). According to T. Lehr-Spławiński, A. E. Suprun and some other scholars, forms of the future tense could also be formed with the auxiliary verb met (“to have”): joz mom sijot (“I will sew”), K. Polyansky considered the verb met in these cases is a modal verb - “I must sew.”

The use of the imperfect joz tех (“I wanted”), mes (“had”), ni-băs (“I wasn't”) and the aorist (sådĕ (“went”), våzą (“took”), påci (“fell”)) attested by a few examples.

The perfect I tense is formed by adding the past participle form with *-lъ from the main verb and the present tense form of the verb “to be”: ją plokol (“cried”), ją våi̯ai̯dål (“went out”). Not many such complex perfect forms are attested, and were replaced by forms formed by combining participial forms with their corresponding personal pronouns: joz plokol (“I cried”), joz sijol (“I sat down”), vån jedål (“he ate”). The perfect II was probably formed under the influence of the perfect of the German language (formed using the verbs haben (“to have”) or sein (“to be”): ich habe geschrieben (“I wrote”)), as in Polabian it is also formed by the combination of the auxiliary verbs met (“to have”) and båi̯t (“to be”) and the passive participle: vån mo nodenă (“he found”), ją våpodenă (“fell”), ją ai̯ḿartĕ (“died”).

==== Mood ====
The indicative and imperative moods are attested. The subjunctive mood is not found in any of the surviving texts. The imperative may be formed with a null morpheme or with -ai̯, which may be followed by an enclitic: ai̯plot (“pay”), püd (“go”), ricai̯-mĕ (“tell him”), jimai̯ jĕg (“catch him”), ai̯plotai̯- mĕ (“pay me”).

==== Voice ====
The passive voice form is formed mainly with the help of the auxiliary verb vardot, borrowed from German werden (become): kǫsonĕ vardol ("was bitten"), vårdă zazonă ("was lit"). There are several examples of forms formed by combining the passive participle with the verb båi̯t (“to be”), perhaps also being forms of the passive voice. Also, forms of the passive voice are formed using reflexive verbs with the particle să,: vinai̯ biją-să (“they are being hit”).

==== Other verb forms ====
In Polabian, forms such as the infinitive, the active present participle, the passive participle and the gerund are attested. T. Lehr-Spławiński, based on the fact that most infinitive forms have stress on the penultimate syllable and several other forms have stress on the last syllable, did not exclude the possibility that supine could have existed in Polabian.

Infinitives are formed with -t: voi̯vist (“to bring out”), vist (“to carry”).

Active participles are formed with -ąc-: kǫ̇săjącĕ (“biting”), l'otojącă (“flying”).

Passive participles are formed from the verb stem using one of three suffixes: -tĕ (-tă), -nĕ (-nă), -enĕ (-enă): nopücǫ̇tă (“begun”), ai̯ḿortĕ (“put to death”, “killed”)

Gerunds, or verbal nouns, are formed on the basis of the passive participle and extended with -ĕ/-ă (from *-ьje), due to the reduction of the vowel in the ending in an unstressed position, it is not always possible to distinguish between a verbal noun and a passive participle. Most often in texts, the gerund appears in the form of the nominative singular, but forms are also found in other cases, in particular in the dative: strai̯zinĕ (from the verb “to cut”), zomăcenă (from the verb “to soak”), vecenĕ (from the verb “to shout”), (kå) voi̯gărnińĕ (“to stop”, from the verb “to stop”).

=== Syntax ===
The word order in Polabian appeared to be as in other Slavic languages, that is, free.

== Sample texts ==
=== The Lord's Prayer ===
Hennig's version

Original orthography:

Nôße Wader,
ta toy giß wa Nebisgáy,
Sjungta woarda Tügí Geima,
Tia Rîk komaj,
Tia Willia ſchinyôt,
kok wa Nebisgáy,
tôk kak no Sime.
Nôßi wißedanneisna Stgeiba doy nâm dâns,
un wittedoy nâm nôße Ggrêch,
kak moy wittedoyime nôßem Grêsmarim.
Ni bringoy nôs ka Warſikónye,
tay löſoáy nôs wit wißókak Chaudak.
Amen.

Transcription:

Nos Fader,
tå tåi̯ jis wå Nĕbiśai̯,
Sjǫtă vårdă Tüji Jai̯mă,
Tüjă Rik komă,
Tüjă viľa Šińot,
kok wå Nĕbiśai̯
tok kăk na Zimĕ,
Nosėj vėsĕdanesnă Sťai̯bĕ doj-nam dans,
un vitĕdoj-nam nos Greχ,
kăk moi̯ vitĕdojimĕ nosĕm Gresnărüm.
Ni brinďoi̯ nos kă Farsükońĕ,
tåi̯ lözoj nos vit vėsokăg Χ́au̯dăg.
Amen.

Translation:

Our Father,
who art in heaven,
may Thy name be holy,
Thy kingdom come,
Thy will to apper,
as in heaven
just as on earth,
Our daily bread give us today,
and forgive us our sin,
as we forgive our sinners.
Do not bring us into temptation,
you deliver us from all evil.
Amen.

Buchholtz's version

Original orthography:

Noos lolga,
Tatta jis wannewü,
geiljona wardatü jau mank,
ka nom kumm tü Ritje,
tü Wilje neke bung te kak,
[…]
dak noosim.
nos daaglitja Sceibe dok […] dans,
[…] noosin du […],
kakma noos du Soneitz perdodime.
ni […] noos Waversoeking,
[…] nom witung skef deta.
[Amen.]

Transcription:

Nos ľoľă,
Tå tåi̯ jis wå Nĕbü,
χai̯ľonă vårdă tüji jai̯mą,
kå nom komă tüj Riťĕ
tüjă Wiľa neχ bǫdĕ kăk,
[…]
tok na zimĕ,
Nosėj dagliťă Sťai̯bĕ doj […] dans,
[…] nosĕ du(ďĕ) […],
kăk moi̯ nosĕ duznai̯ca perdodimĕ.
Ni […] nos Wå farsökǫ […],
[…] nom vit tǫ χ́au̯dötĕ.
[Amen.]

Translation:

Our father,
who Thou art in heaven,
hallowed by Thy name,
Thy kingdom come to use
may Thy will be as,
[…]
as on earth,
Our daily bread give […] today,
[…] our debts […],
as we forgive our debtors.
Do not […] us into temptation […],
[…] us from evil.
[Amen.]

Mitthoff's version

Transcription:

nos fader,
tådĕ tåi̯ jis vå tüjĕm nĕbiśau̯
sjǫtă mo vårdot tüji jai̯mą,
tüj rik komă
tüjă viľa mo-sa šińot
vå nĕbiśau̯ kăk
vėsai̯ sokvoi̯ no zimĕ,
nosėj dagliťă sťai̯bĕ düj-nam dans,
un vitĕdüj-năm nosĕ greχ́ĕ,
kok moi̯ vitedüjimĕ nosĕm gresnărüm.
Ni farförüj-năs vå farsökǫ,
erlözüj-nas vit tüg χ́au̯dăg.
Amen.

Translation:

Our father,
there Thou art in Thy heaven,
may Thy name become holy,
Thy kingdom come
may Thy will appear,
in heaven
like all things on earth,
Our daily bread give us today,
and forgive us our sins,
as we forgive our sinners.
Do not lead us into temptation,
save us from [the] evil.
Amen.

== Bibliography ==
- Kapović, Mate (2008), Uvod u indoeuropsku lingvistiku (in Serbo-Croatian), Zagreb: Matica hrvatska, ISBN 978-953-150-847-6
- Lehr-Spławiński, Tadeusz (1929), Gramatyka połabska (in Polish), Lwów: Lwowska Bibljoteka Slawistyczna
- Lehr-Spławiński, Tadeusz (1934). O narzeczach Słowian nadbałtyckich (in Polish). Toruń.
- Olesch, Reinhold (1977), "Jezik polapskih Drevana: Stanje i zadaci istraživanja", Suvremena Lingvistika (in Serbo-Croatian), 15, Zagreb, archived from the original (PDF) on 2009-05-06
- Polański, Kazimierz; Sehnert, Janusz (1967), Polabian-English Dictionary, The Hague: Mouton
- Polański, Kazimierz (1993), "Polabian", in Bernard Comrie and Greville G. Corbett (ed.), The Slavonic languages, London & New York: Routledge, ISBN 978-0-415-28078-5
- Rzetelska-Feleszko, Ewa (2002), "Polabisch" (PDF), Enzyklopädie des Europäischen Ostens (in German), Klagenfurt, archived from the original (PDF) on 2007-09-27
- Tadeusz Lehr-Spławiński; Kazimierz Polański, eds. (1962–1971). Słownik etymologiczny języka Drzewian połabskich (in Polish). Vol. 1–2. Wrocław.
- Селищев, Афанасий (1941). Славянское языкознание. Западнославянские языки. Государственное учебно-педагогическое издательство Наркомпроса РСФСР. pp. 419–448.
- Супрун, Адам (1966). "Новые издания по полабской лексикографии и лексикологии". Советское славяноведение (2): 91–98.
- Супрун, Адам (1989). Введение в славянскую филологию. Минск: Вышэйшая школа. pp. 99–105.
- Lehr-Spławiński, Tadeusz (1966). "O «mazurzeniu» w języku połabskim". Studia i szkice wybrane z językoznawstwa słowiańskiego. 2: 94.
- Polański, Kazimierz (2010). Gramatyka języka połabskiego. p. 209.
- Топоров, Владимир (1975). "Полабский язык". In Александр Михайлович Прохоров (ed.). Большая советская энциклопедия. Vol. 20 (3 ed.). Советская Энциклопедия.
- Супрун, Адам (1990). "Полабский язык". Лингвистический энциклопедический словарь. Советская энциклопедия. ISBN 5-85270-031-2.
- Селищев, Афанасий (2010). Соканье и шоканье в славянских языках. pp. 106–108.
- Berneker, Erich (2019) [1902]. Slavische Chrestomathie. Mit Glossaren (in German). De Gruyter. ISBN 9783111474878.

== See also ==
- Wends
- Polabians (tribe)
- House of Griffins
- Pomeranian language
- Kashubian language
- Slovincian language
