= Battle of Schmilau =

11th century battle between Christians and Slavic Pagans

The Battle of Schmilau (German: Schlacht bei Schmilau) was a battle between a coalition of Christian forces and pagan Slavic Obotrites in 1093.

Henry, a Christian Obotrite prince raised in Denmark after the murder of his father Gottschalk, avenged his father's death by killing the pagan Obotrite chief Kruto in 1093. The pagan Slavs rose up in rebellion against Henry's attempt to seize power.

Henry was supported by Duke Magnus of Saxony and a Danish contingent, while the pagans were led by Rochel, a Wagrian prince and pirate from the vicinity of Oldenburg. Henry was victorious in the battle at Schmilau, near Ratzeburg in eastern Holstein. The victory allowed Henry to consolidate the Obotrite realm and establish Liubice as his capital.
