= Liubice =

Medieval west slavic settlement near present-day Lübeck

Coordinates: 53°54′28″N 10°42′52″E

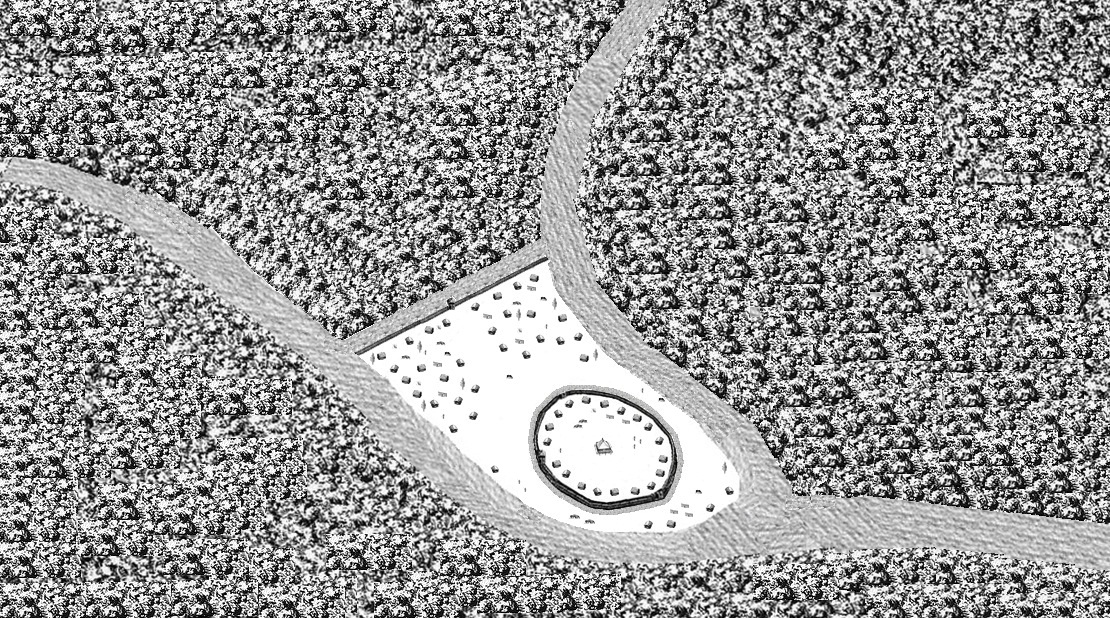
- Interactive map of Liubice
- Type: Historical settlement
- Location: Near modern Lübeck, Germany

Liubice, also known by the German name Alt-Lübeck ("Old Lübeck"), was a medieval West Slavic settlement near the site of modern Lübeck, Germany. Liubice was located at the confluence of the Schwartau with the Trave across from Teerhof Island, approximately four kilometres north of Lübeck's island old town. The residence of Henry, the Christian prince of the Obotrites, Liubice was destroyed after his death by the Rani pagans of Rugia.

== History ==
Slavic tribes began migrating to the Bay of Lübeck in the 7th century, replacing migrating Germanic tribes. The Wagrians and Polabians established numerous villages and castles, including Starigard, Plune, Racisburg, and Liubice, whose name means "lovely".

Liubice was sparsely populated during the 9th and 10th centuries. In the middle of the 11th century, the settlement began to develop. Starting in 1055 during the rule of Gottschalk, a Christian prince of the Obotrite confederacy, the old castle was rebuilt. Gottschalk was killed during an uprising in 1066 and replaced as Obotrite prince by the pagan Kruto. Liubice's castle was modified for the second time in 1087, near the end of Kruto's reign. Because the fortifications were located on a peninsula between the Schwartau and Trave Rivers, a twelve metre wide trench was created to separate Liubice from the mainland, essentially creating an island fortress.

Liubice reached its height during the reign of the prince or "King of the Slavs", the Christian Henry, who avenged his father Gottschalk's death by killing Kruto in 1093. The harbour settlement of Liubice, which lay in the borderland between the Wagrians, Polabians, and Obotrites, was chosen as Henry's royal residence. The relatively small castle's walls had a diameter of approximately 75 to 100 metres. The castle church built by Henry c. 1100 was the earliest discernible stone construction in the region; members of the princely family were buried inside the church. The princely palace probably lay northwest of the castle's own Christian church, while a granary was east of the church. Cattle stalls were located to the southeast next to the ramparts. The castle complex also contained houses for the garrison and probably goldsmithing workshops or a mint. The castle was surrounded by a wooden earthworks with a southern gate. Southwest of the castle under the protection of its walls was a settlement of craftsmen. To the northwest across the trench was a poorer settlement, probably of servants. To the southwest across the Trave was a colony of foreign, mostly Saxon, merchants who were allowed their own Christian church.

Around 1100 Liubice was besieged by the fleet of the Rani pagans, but with the assistance of Saxons from Holstein, Henry forced the Rani to pay tribute. The Obotrite state collapsed after the death of Henry and end of the Nakonid dynasty in 1127; the Rani returned to sack Liubice in 1128. With the death of Canute Lavard in 1131, the Obotrite lands were partitioned between Niklot, who received Mecklenburg, and Pribislav, who received Wagria and Polabia. Pribislav chose Liubice as his residence in order to assert his claims for the inheritance of Henry, but he was reduced to being a Saxon vassal in Wagria after being defeated by Henry of Badewide in the late 1130s. Liubice and the Oldenburg region were ravaged by another Rani campaign in 1138 in which the castle's church was destroyed.

Granted Wagria and Segeberg by Duke Henry the Lion in 1143, Count Adolf II of Holstein founded the new German settlement of Lübeck four kilometres from Liubice on a peninsula called Bucu at the confluence of the Wakenitz with the Trave. The remaining Slavic inhabitants of the region held their assemblies at Lübeck's Marienkirche until the 13th century. Some of the older Slavic laws were incorporated into Lübeck's city code, Lübeck law.

== Excavation ==
Archaeological findings in the 1970s indicated that Liubice was older than previously thought. The oldest wall dates back to 819, while further sections of the wall date to 1055 and 1087. Dendrochronological date indicates two repairs on the wall and activity inside of the castle in 1002 and 1035. The stone church, discovered in 1852, was preceded by a wooden church. Plaiting and block construction were found scattered inside the ruins of the castle complex.

== See also ==
- Timeline of Lübeck
