= Mecklenburg Castle =

Castle in Dorf Mecklenburg, Mecklenburg-Vorpommern, Germany

Coordinates: 53°50′14″N 11°28′16″E

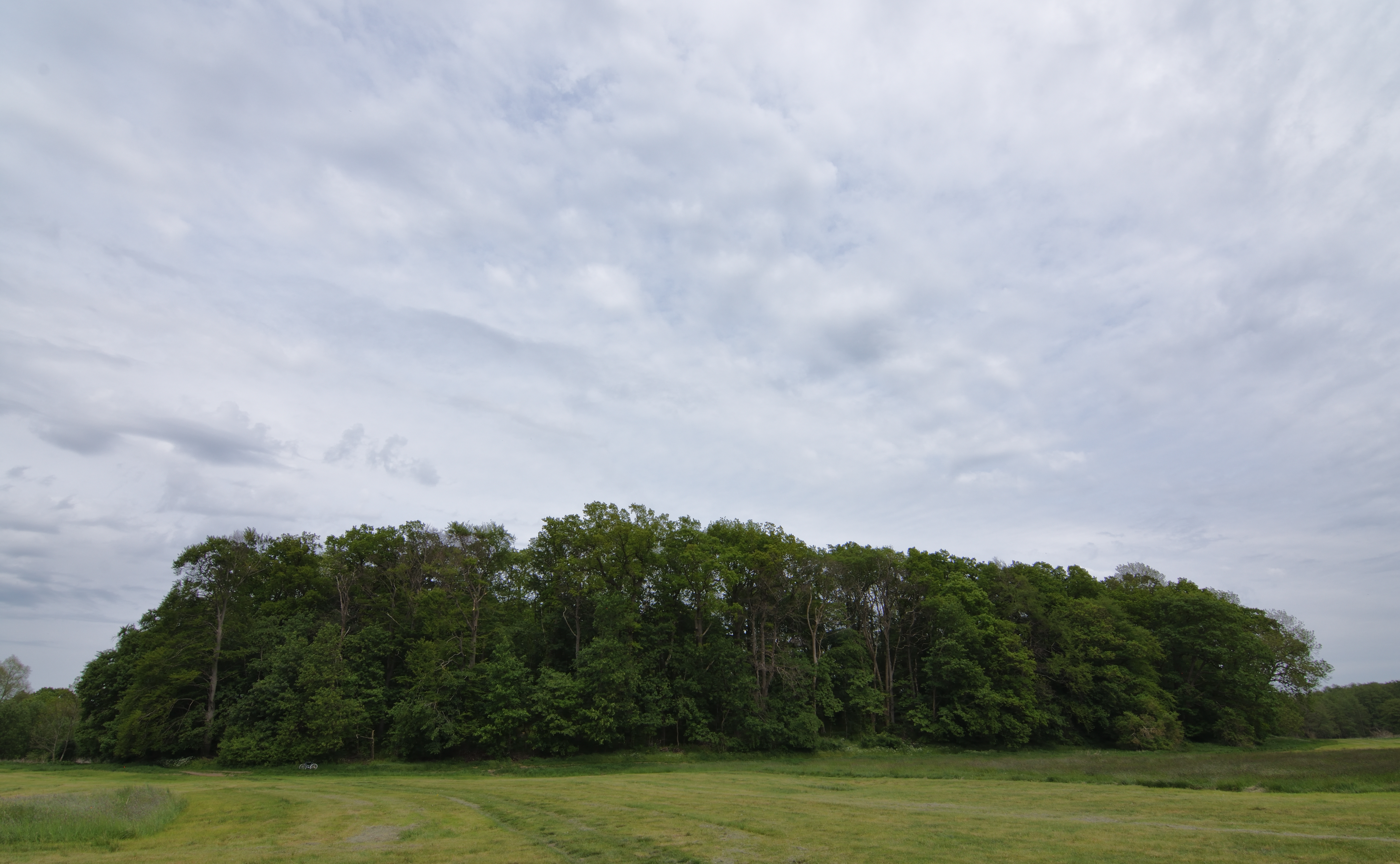
Castle mound of the former Mecklenburg Castle in Dorf Mecklenburg

Mecklenburg Castle was a medieval castle and a residential capital of the Nakonid and Nikloting dynasties of the Obotrites. It was located just south of the modern village Dorf Mecklenburg, seven kilometres (4 miles) south of the Bay of Wismar in Mecklenburg-Vorpommern, Germany. The only remnants of the ruined castle are parts of an earthen wall. Some scholars have associated Mecklenburg with the medieval trading emporium Reric.

== Etymology ==
The travelling merchant Ibrahim Ibn Jacub described Mecklenburg as “Nakon’s Castle” in 965. By 995 it was documented as Michelenburg or Mikelenburg, meaning "large castle" in Old Saxon, the ancient version of Low German (mikil = large; Burg = castle). The original name of the castle was most likely "Veligrad" or "Wiligrad", which also means "large castle" in the Slavic Polabian dialect which was previously spoken in the region. This led to another castle, located in Lübstorf on the shores of Lake Schwerin and built between 1896 and 1898 for Duke John Albert of Mecklenburg, being named Wiligrad Castle (de:Schloss Wiligrad). In Latin, it was known as Magnopolis. The later duchy and region of Mecklenburg derives its name from the castle.

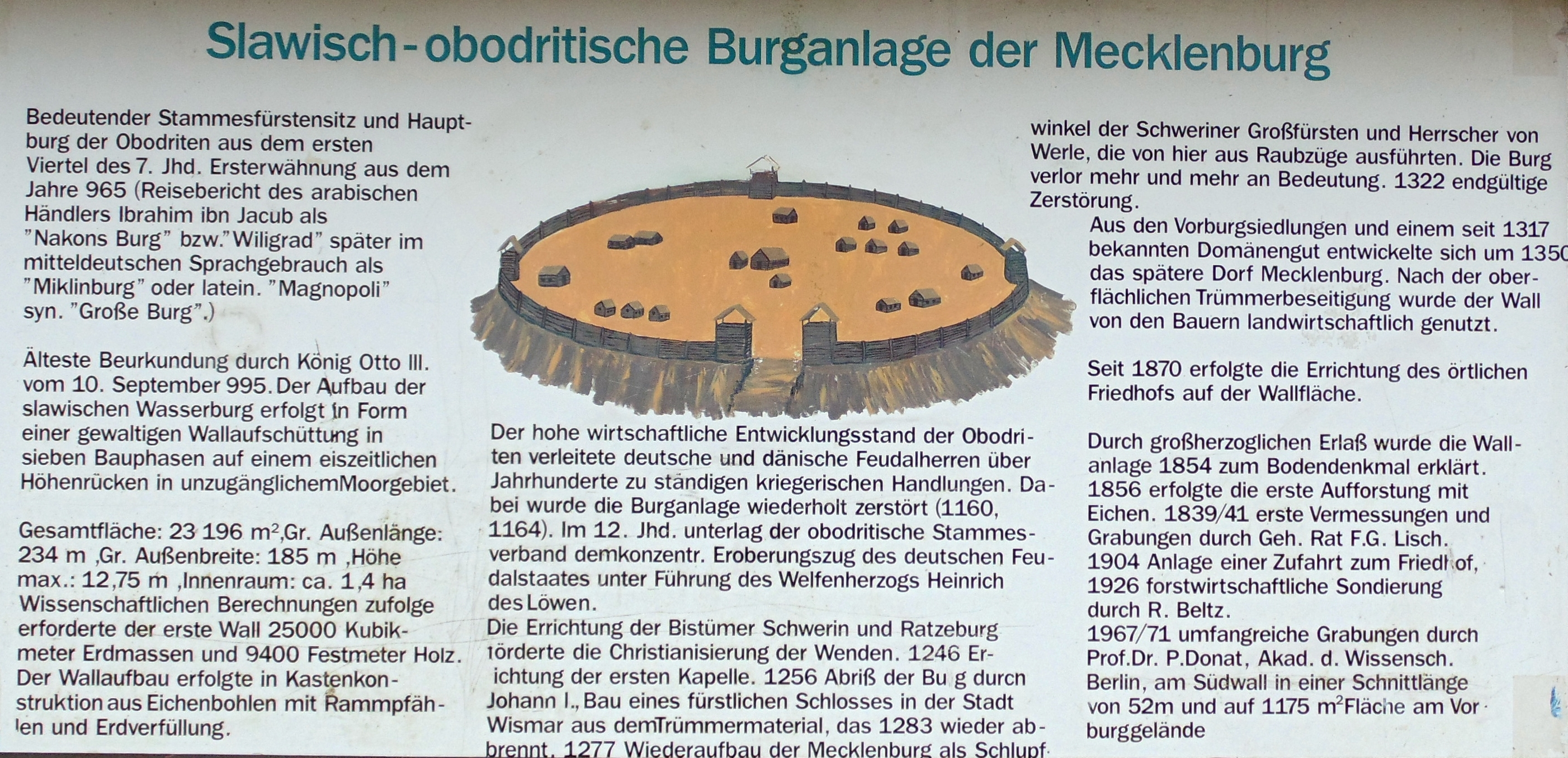
There is an information board at the foot of the mound of the former Mecklenburg Castle

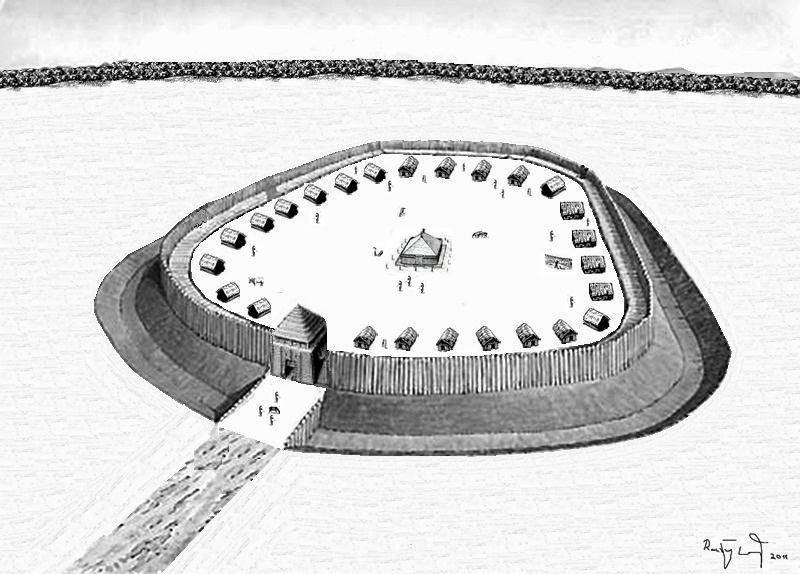
Simple drawing of how Mecklenburg Castle might have looked

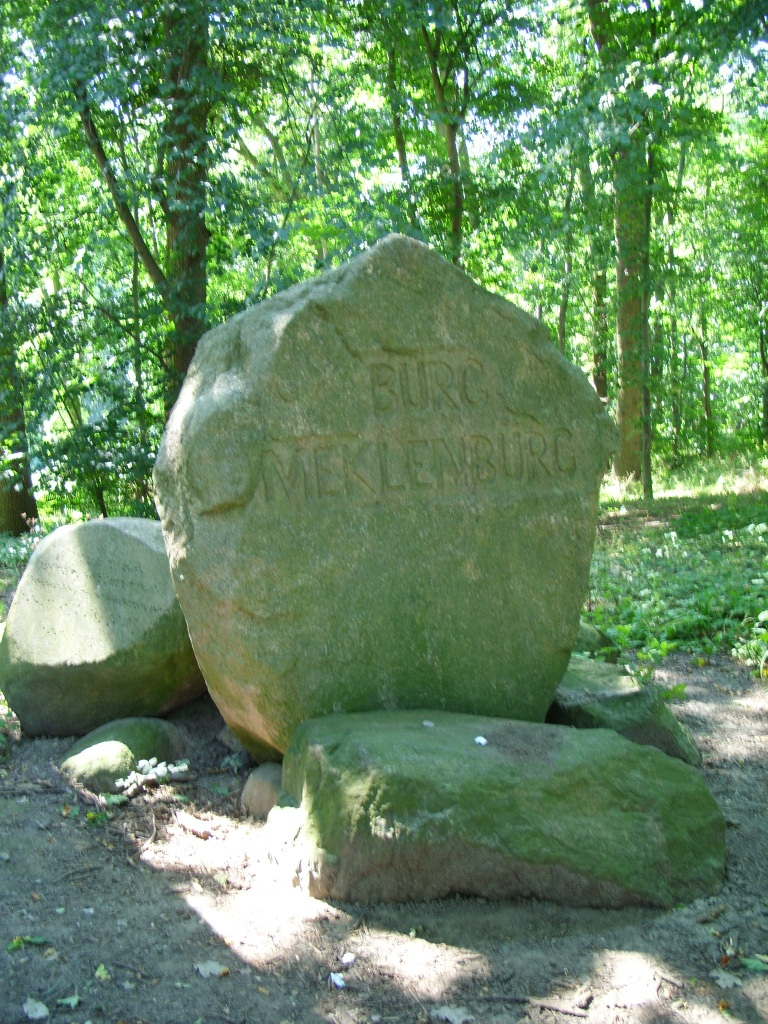
Commemorative stone on the top of the castle mound with the inscription "Burg Meklenburg"

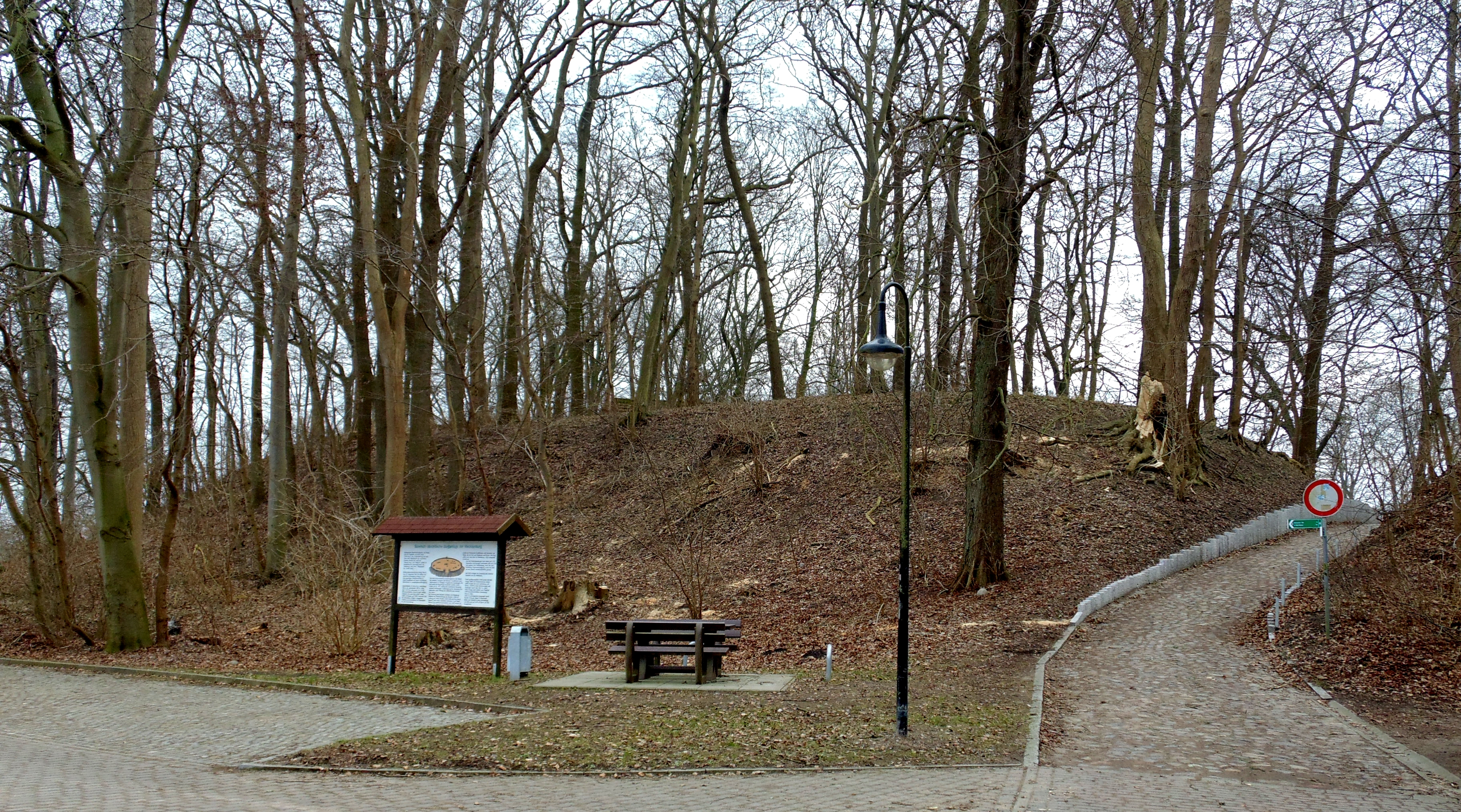
Mound of Mecklenburg Castle with the information board

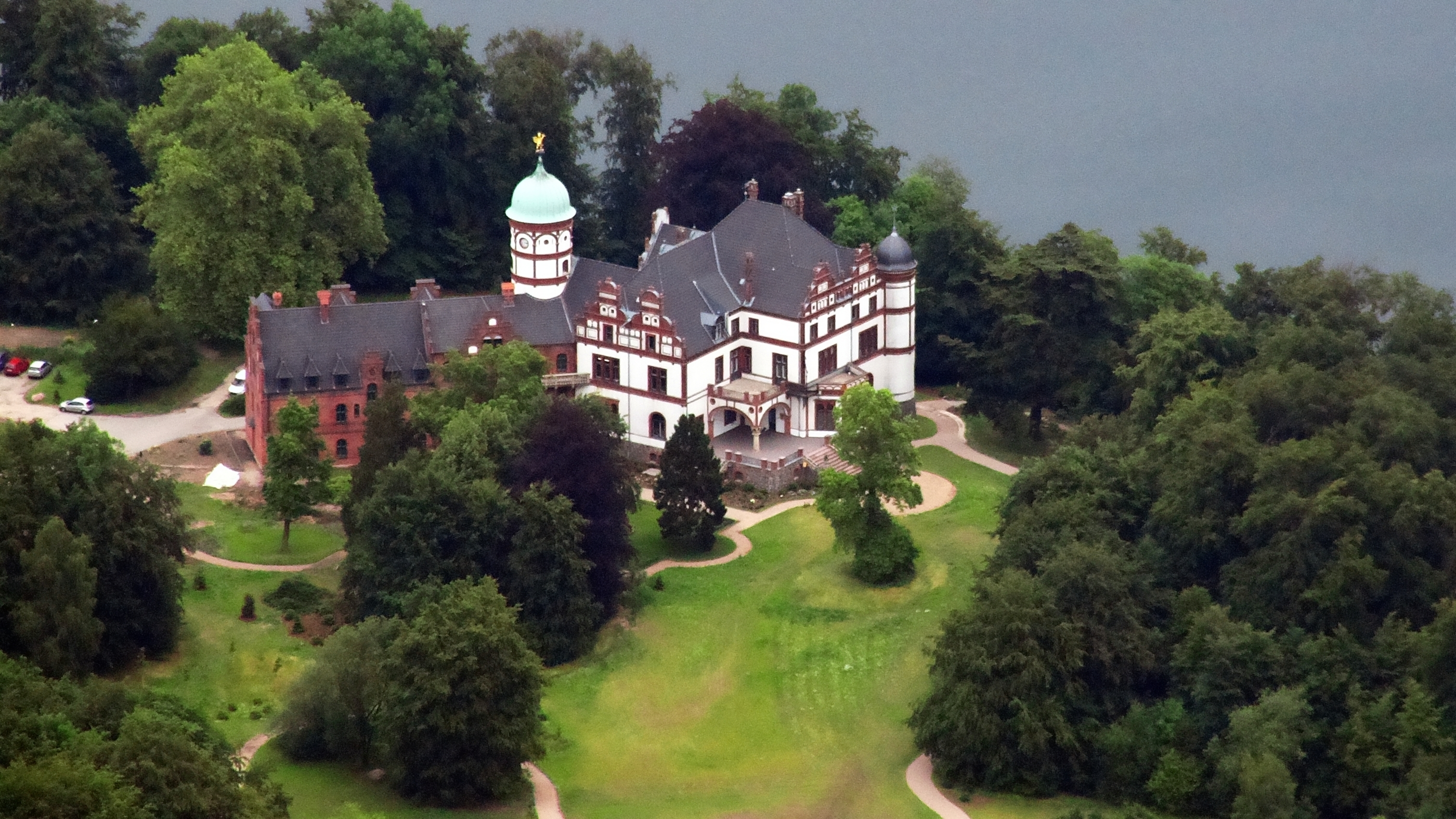
Wiligrad Castle (de:Schloss Wiligrad) in Lübstorf on Lake Schwerin derives its name from the original, Slavic designation for Mecklenburg Castle

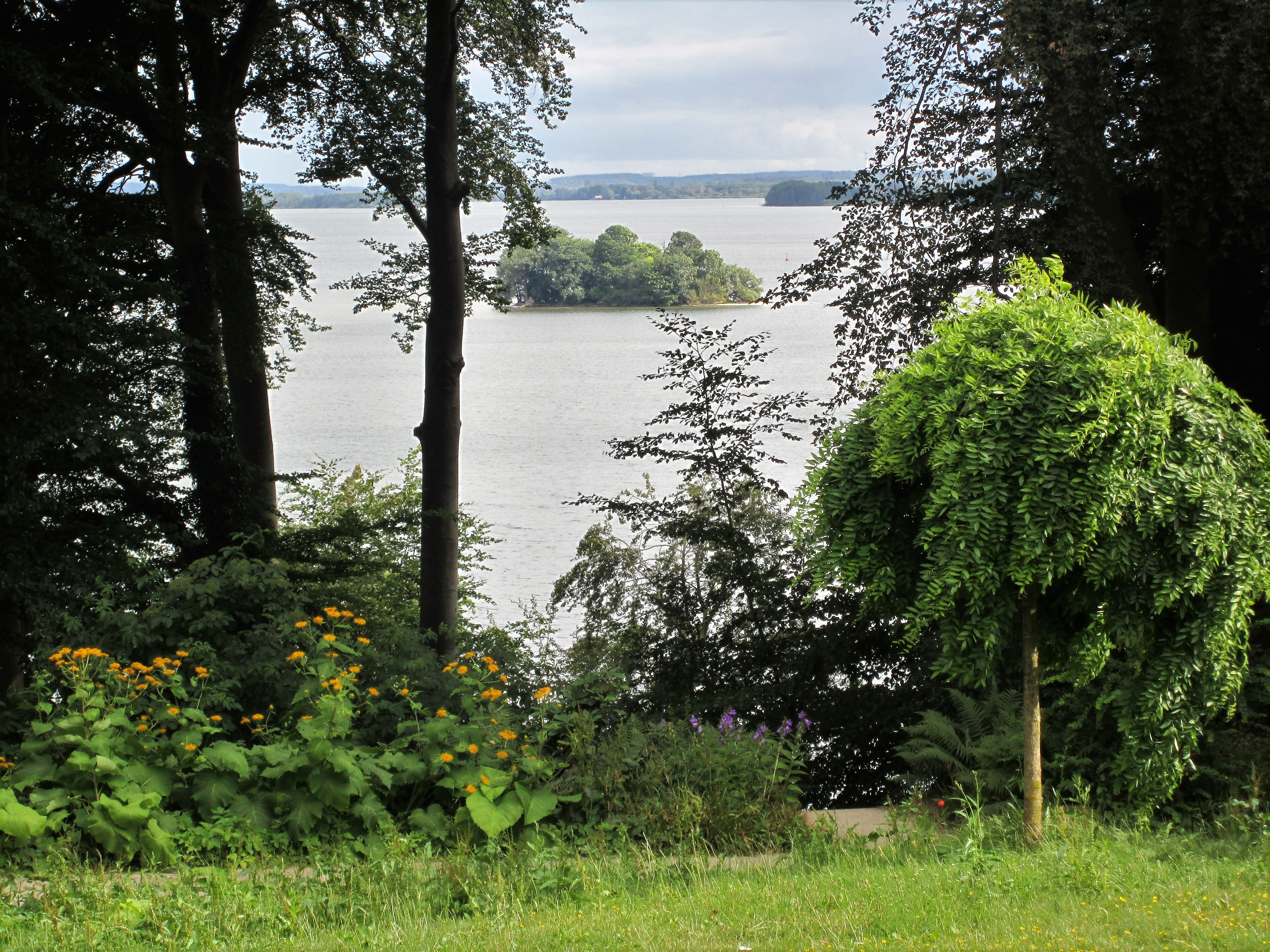
View of Lake Schwerin from the castle gardens of Wiligrad Castle

Location of Dorf Mecklenburg in the district of Nordwestmecklenburg of Mecklenburg-Western Pomerania, between the Hanseatic city of Wismar and Lake Schwerin

== History ==
Excavations indicate that the first castle of Mecklenburg was built in the 7th or 8th century in a lowland at the tip of a lakeland peninsula. It was possibly the Obotrite residence of Reric, destroyed in 808. If associated with Reric, merchants were at the castle by the beginning of the 9th century. Significant market traffic would have developed in the 10th century.; a number of silver artifacts have been found in the vicinity of the ruins.

The castle of Mecklenburg became a seat of Obotrite princes by the 10th century at the latest. It lay on a route from Hamburg to Wolin, assuring the castle importance as an economic and political center. The powerful Obotrite prince resided in the castle by 965.

The castle flourished as the residence of the Christian prince Gottschalk (ruled 1043–1066) and the seat of the Irish bishop John of Mecklenburg; the castle contained churches and three monasteries by 1066. During a widespread pagan rebellion later that year, Gottschalk was killed and his family fled from Mecklenburg Castle. The head of Bishop John was displayed at the pagan center of Rethra.

Henry, a younger son of Gottschalk, avenged his father's death by killing the pagan usurper Kruto in 1093. However, he chose as his residence Liubice, which was near the borders of the Wagrians, Polabians, and Obotrites, instead of Mecklenburg Castle, which was in the heart of the Obotrite territory. The castle also began to lose its prominence as the Kingdom of Germany began expanding eastward.

As part of Duke Henry the Lion of Saxony’s expansionary goals, the Archbishop of Bremen placed a bishop named Emmehard at Mecklenburg in 1149, as the bishopric had been vacant since 1066. In 1160 King Valdemar the Great of Denmark and Henry the Lion campaigned against the Obotrite prince, Niklot, who burned his castles at Ilow, Mecklenburg, Schwerin, and Dobin in order to avoid being pinned down in sieges. Niklot was ultimately killed at Werle during the campaign, however, and the Obotrite territory was partitioned between Saxon ministeriales; Mecklenburg Castle passed to Count Heinrich von Schaten. The Bishopric of Mecklenburg was replaced by the Bishopric of Schwerin in the same year.

Niklot's son Pribislav led a Slavic rebellion in 1163 against Henry the Lion and the German lords occupying Obotrite castles. Although Pribislav sacked Mecklenburg in 1164, the rebellion was eventually defeated at the Battle of Verchen later that year. In need of an ally against the Saxon nobility three years later, Henry allowed Pribislav to receive his father's Niklot's inheritance and became the Prince of Mecklenburg, Kessin, and Rostock.

Market traffic was documented at Mecklenburg in 1168, although most of the trade was passing to Schwerin. In 1265, the castle was torn down to provide building material for the construction of a palace in the growing city of Wismar. Although the princes in Schwerin rebuilt the castle at Mecklenburg in 1277 for use as a staging point for raids, it was demolished 45 years later.

The modern village of Mecklenburg developed from a mid-14th century settlement near the castle. After the cursory removal of the ruins, the rampart was used for agriculture. Georg Christian Friedrich Lisch, active from 1839 to 1841, was the first to begin surveying the ruins. The wall was established as a memorial in 1854 by Grand Duke Friedrich Franz II of Mecklenburg-Schwerin, while reforestation with oak trees began two years later. From 1967 to 1971, Prof. Dr. Donat of the Akademie der Wissenschaften der DDR led extensive excavations into a 52 m (171 ft) section of the southern wall and an area of 1,175 m^{2} (12,650 sq ft) near the ruins. The diameter of the oval inner court reached 95 to 140 m (312 to 459 ft), while the ramparts rose 10 metres (33 ft). The street, “Am Burgwall”, leads to the still visible remnants of the castle's rampart; the area has been used a cemetery since 1870.

== Notable people ==
- Alexander Ferdinand Koenig (1858–1940), naturalist and zoologist
