= Pribislav of Wagria =

Obotrite prince

Pribislav (fl. 1131 – after 1156) was an Obotrite prince who ruled Wagria as "Lesser king" (regulus) and resided in Liubice, governing one half of the Obotrite lands, the other half being governed by Niklot.

== Life ==
Pribislav was the son of Budivoj, and nephew of Henry. After the murder of Canute Lavard in 1131, the Obotrite lands were partitioned between Pribislav and Niklot, with the former receiving Wagria and Polabia and the latter Mecklenburg until the Peene River; Pribislav received the title regulus, or lesser king and resided in Liubice. A follower of Slavic paganism, Pribislav was described by Emperor Lothair III, whom he was dependent upon, as an enemy of Christianity and an idolater.

After the death of Lothair in 1137, Lothair's son-in-law Henry the Proud and Margrave Albert the Bear fought over the Duchy of Saxony. Pribislav took advantage of the struggle to rebel against the authority of the Holy Roman Empire by destroying the new castle of Segeberg and invading Holstein in Summer 1138. Saxons from Holstein and Stormarn under the command of Henry of Badewide led a massive counterattack the following winter. Another Holsatian campaign in Summer 1139 devastated the Slavic inhabitants of Wagria and placed the territory under German control.

The Slavs under Pribislav's rule were reduced to living in the northeastern corner of Wagria. The prince complained to the Bishop of Oldenburg that the taxation and oppression of the Saxon lords were essentially driving the Wagrians to the Baltic Sea. The Slavs retained their old religious practices, such as worship of the god Porewit, near Oldenburg. On Tuesdays Pribislav held court with pagan priests and representatives of the Slavic population. Count Adolf II of Holstein ultimately won over Pribislav through gifts, and Pribislav converted to Roman Catholic Christianity in 1156.
