= Bucu =

Coordinates: 53°52′25″N 10°41′21″E

Bucu or Buku is a hill island surrounded by the Trave and Wakenitz Rivers in Lübeck, Germany. It is also the name of a medieval Slavic castle, now ruined, on the island. Count Adolf II of Holstein founded Lübeck on the island in 1143. The Burgkloster, or fortified monastery, of Lübeck is located atop the ruins of Bucu. "Bucu" is also the name of a hill.

== History ==
Fortifications probably existed at Bucu by the end of the 7th century or the beginning of the 8th century. When the Christian Obotrite prince Gottschalk was killed at Lenzen in 1066, the pagan Kruto took control of Wagria and made it his base of power. Kruto neglected the developing settlement of Liubice and instead developed Bucu between the Trave and the Wakenitz; Gottschalk's son Henry made Liubice the Obotrite capital after killing Kruto in 1093, however. With the death of Henry in 1127 and the Rani sack of Liubice the following year, Bucu began to assume greater importance as merchants moved to the fortified hill. Count Adolf II of Holstein founded Lübeck in 1143 near the castle, which offered protection to the new harbour settlement.

== Excavation ==
Bucu was excavated by archaeologists in the 1970s. Recovery excavations at the Kleine Gröpelgrube unearthed a nearby settlement, the suburbium, in 1997. The exposed findings indicate that the region east of the castle was inhabited by Slavs from the 8th or 9th century until the middle of the 12th century.

In a southern section of the current Große Burgstraße, a 3.5 m wide and 2.5 m deep trench protected the settlement. The northern border was presumably north of the current Königstraße. To the west the settlement bordered the castle directly, while to the east it reached the Wakenitz. The settlement area was probably about 6 ha. Discoveries in the interior include mines, mining houses, hearths, and a great number of ceramic objects. The remnants of a potter's workshop were found in the Kleine Gröpelgrube. A Slavic pottery tradition could have existed at the location until the arrival of Saxons in the 12th century. The Kleine Gröpelgrube was first mentioned in 1297 as parva platea lutifigulorum, or the small street of the loam potters.
