= Henry of Badewide =

- Graf of Holstein; Count of Botwide (1149); Count of Ratzeburg (1156)
- Successor: Graf of Holstein: Adolf II; Bernard I, Count of Ratzeburg
- Native name: Heinrich von Badewide
- Other titles: Comes Polaborum (1154); Graf von Ratzeburg (1156); Vogt von Ratzeburg (1162)
- Died: 1164
- Spouse: A relative of King Valdemar I of Denmark

Henry of Badewide (or Badwide) (German: Heinrich von Badewide) (died ca. 1164) was a Saxon Count of Botwide (after 1149) and Count of Ratzeburg (after 1156).

Henry came from a knightly family from Lüneburg. He took his name from Bode near Ebstorf. He married a relative of King Valdemar I of Denmark and had two brothers, Helmold and Volrad; the latter was not, as often supposed, the first Count of Dannenberg.

After replacing Henry the Proud as Duke of Saxony in 1138, Albert the Bear made Henry a Graf (count) of Holstein, but Henry was soon replaced by Adolf II. Gertrude of Süpplingenburg granted Henry a claim to Wagria to the east of Holstein. In response to a raid by the Obotrite prince Pribislav, Henry led a campaign into Wagria against the Polabian Slavs. The lands around Plön, Lütjenburg, and Oldenburg were laid waste, as was the region between the Schwale, the Baltic Sea, and the Trave. The campaign failed to capture any of the strong castles, however. A campaign in 1139 killed much of the population and captured Plön.

Henry feuded with Count Adolf II of Schauenburg over Holstein and Wagria. In 1143, Duke Henry the Lion mediated between the two counts, granting Wagria and Segeberg to Adolf. Henry was granted Polabia and Ratzeburg. The newly created County of Ratzenburg included Ratzeburg, Boitin, Gadebusch, Wittenburg, and Boizenburg. The count pursued a policy of expelling the native Slavs and inviting Westphalians to settle in the conquered territory.

Henry received the titles Comes Polaborum (1154), Graf von Ratzeburg (1156), and Vogt von Ratzeburg (1162). He was succeeded by his son, Bernard I, Count of Ratzeburg.
