= Polabian Slavs =

Collective term applied to a number of West Slavic tribes

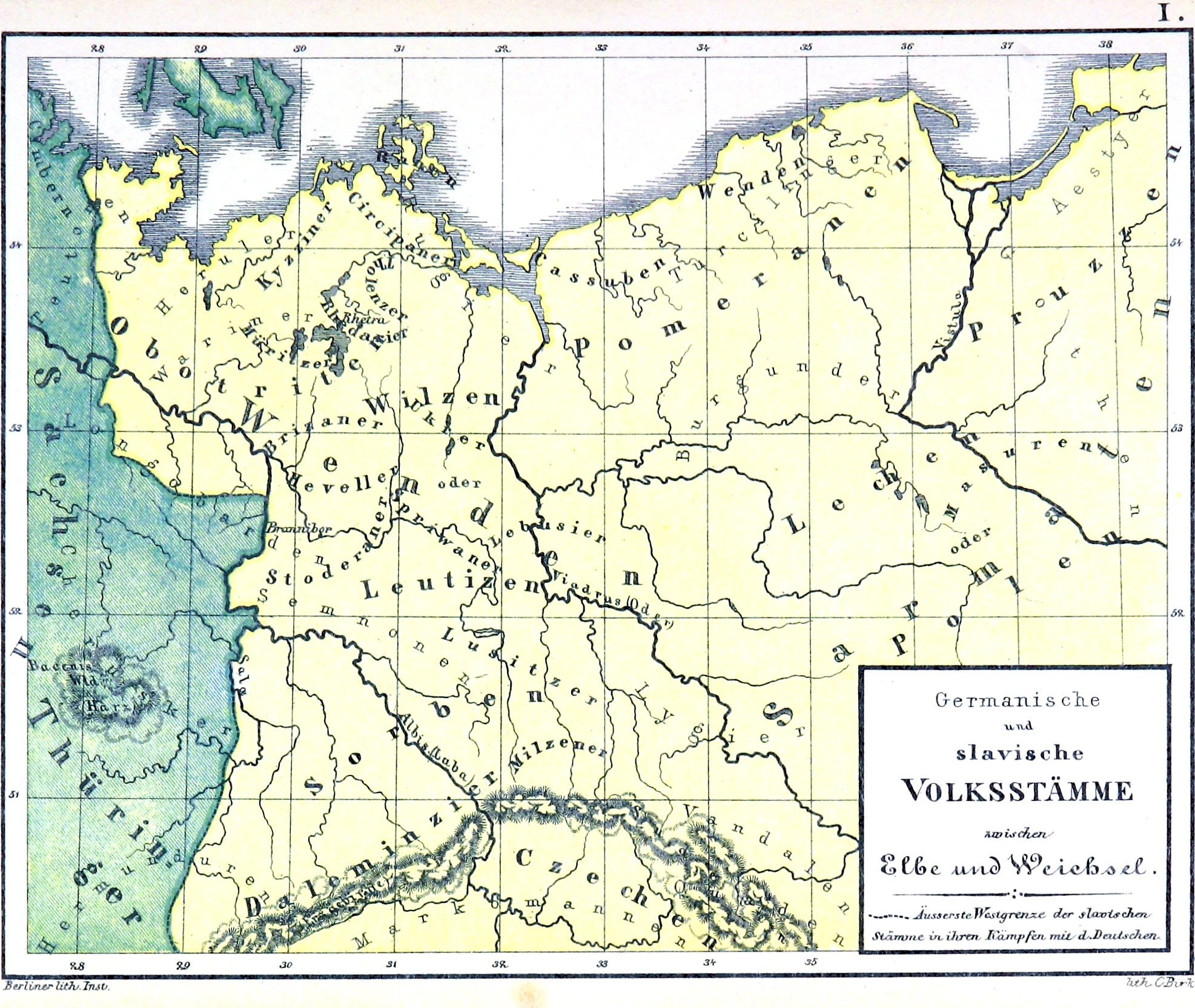
The areas inhabited by Slavs in the early Middle Ages on a German map showing the course of the Limes Sorabicus – the border between the Germans and the Slavs.

Polabian Slavs, also known as Elbe Slavs (Note: Lower Sorbian: Połobske Słowjany, pronounced [ˈpɔwɔpskɛ ˈswɔwʲanɨ]; German: Elbslawen; Polish: Słowianie połabscy, Połabianie; Czech: Polabští Slované; Latin: Slavi Polabicae; The name Laba (or similar) refers to the Elbe River in various Slavic languages.) and more broadly as Wends, is a collective term applied to a number of Lechitic (West Slavic) tribes who lived along the Elbe river in what is today eastern Germany. The approximate territory stretched from the Baltic Sea in the north, the river Saale and the Limes Saxoniae in the west, the Ore Mountains and the Western Sudetes in the south, and medieval Poland in the east.

The Polabian Slavic tribes were initially independent and had their own princes. Since the 7th century, some of them were forced to recognize the supreme royal authority of the neighboring Frankish rulers, but their relations with Merovingian and later Carolingian and Ottonian kings and emperors were marked by frequent frontier conflicts and uprisings. From the 9th century onwards, they were largely conquered by rulers of Eastern Francia and in time integrated into the Holy Roman Empire. In the following centuries, the tribes became gradually assimilated through Germanization during the Ostsiedlung. The modern Sorbs are the only descendants of the Polabian Slavs to have retained their identity and culture.

The northern Polabian language is now extinct, while the two Sorbian languages are still spoken by approximately 22,000–30,000 inhabitants of the region. The government of Germany regards Upper and Lower Sorbian as official regional languages.

== Tribes ==
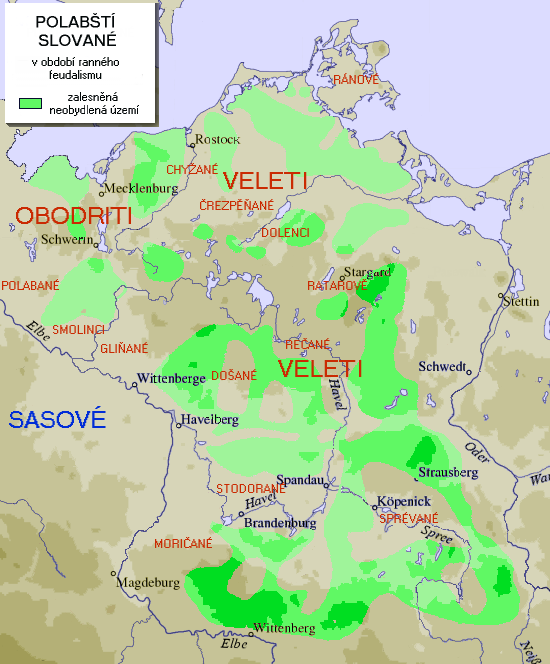
Northern Polabian Slavic tribes (uninhabited forested area marked in green)

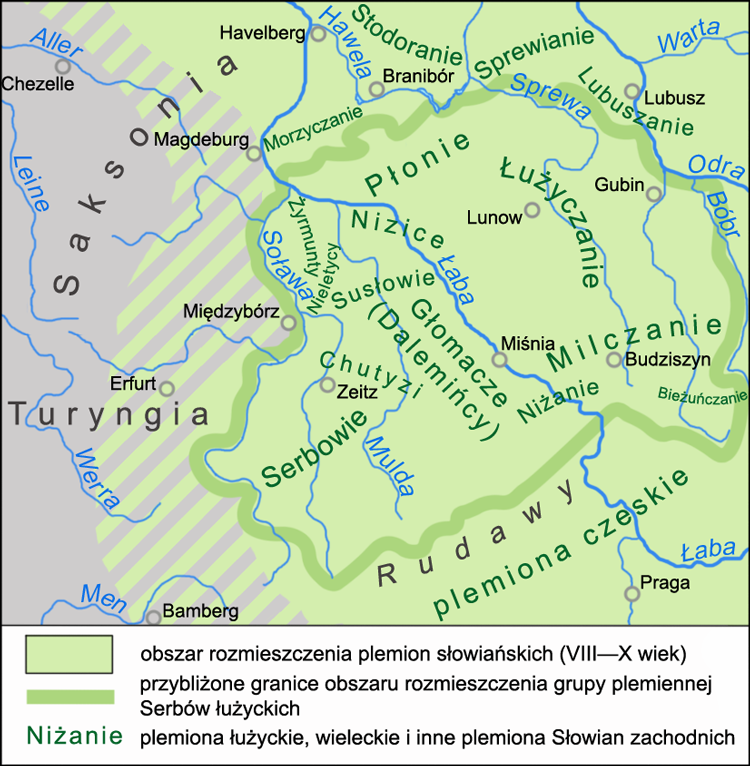
Southern Polabian Slavic tribes (Sorbs)

The Bavarian Geographer, an anonymous medieval document compiled in Regensburg in 830, lists the Slavic tribes in Central Europe east of the Elbe. Among others, it mentions the Uuilci (Veleti) with 95 civitates, the Nortabtrezi (Obotrites) with 53 civitates, the Surbi (Sorbs) with 50 civitates, the Milzane (Milceni) with 30 civitates, the Hehfeldi (Hevelli) with 14 civitates, etc. The Great Soviet Encyclopedia classifies the Polabian Slavs into three main tribes: the Obotrites, the Veleti, and the Lusatian Sorbs.

The main tribes of the Obotritic confederation were the Obotrites proper (Wismar Bay to the Schweriner See), the Wagrians (eastern Holstein), the Warnabi (Warnower) (the upper Warnow and Mildenitz), and the Polabians proper (between the Trave and the Elbe). Other tribes associated with the confederation included the Linones (Linonen) near Lenzen, the Travnjane near the Trave, and the Drevani in the Hanoverian Wendland and the northern Altmark.

The Veleti, also known as the Liutizians or Wilzians, included the Kessinians (Kessiner, Chyzzini) along the lower Warnow and Rostock; the Circipani (Zirzipanen) between the Recknitz, Trebel, and Peene Rivers; the Tollenser east and south of the Peene along the Tollense River; and the Redarier south and east of the Tollensesee on the upper Havel. The Redarier were the most important of the Veleti tribes. The Rani of Rügen, not to be confused with the older Germanic Rugians, are sometimes considered to be part of the Veleti.

South of the Rani were the Ucri (Ukranen) along the Ucker and the Morici (Morizani, Müritzer) along the Müritz; the former gave their name to the Uckermark. Smaller tribes included the Došane along the Dosse, the Zamzizi in the Ruppin Land, and the Rěčanen on the upper Havel. Along the lower Havel and near the confluence of the Elbe and the Havel lived the Nelětici, the Liezizi, the Zemzizi, the Smeldingi (Smeldinger), and the Bethenici. The middle Havel region and the Havelland were settled by the Hevelli, a tribe loosely connected to the Veleti. East of the Hevelli lived the Sprevane of the lower Dahme and Spree rivers. Small tribes on the middle Elbe included the Morizani and the Zerwisti.

The Sorbs' confederation in the Elbe–Saale region included the Citici, Serimunt, Colodici, Siusler, Nizici, Glomaci (Daleminzier), and Nisanen along the upper Elbe; as well as the Chutici, Plisni, Gera, Puonzowa, Tucharin, Weta, and groups of Nelětici living near the Saale. Joachim Herrmann believed strongly that the core Sorbian tribes were the Colodici, Siusler, and Glomaci and that they settled around and influenced the subsequent development of Magdeburg, Havelland, Thuringia, and northeastern Bavaria. To the east, the confederation may have later included the Lusici of Lower Lusatia and the Milceni of Upper Lusatia; to the east of these tribs were the Selpoli and the Besunzanen; and on the middle Oder the Leubuzzi, who were associated with medieval Poland.

Small groups of West Slavs lived on the Main and the Regnitz rivers near Bamberg, in northeastern Bavaria.

== History ==
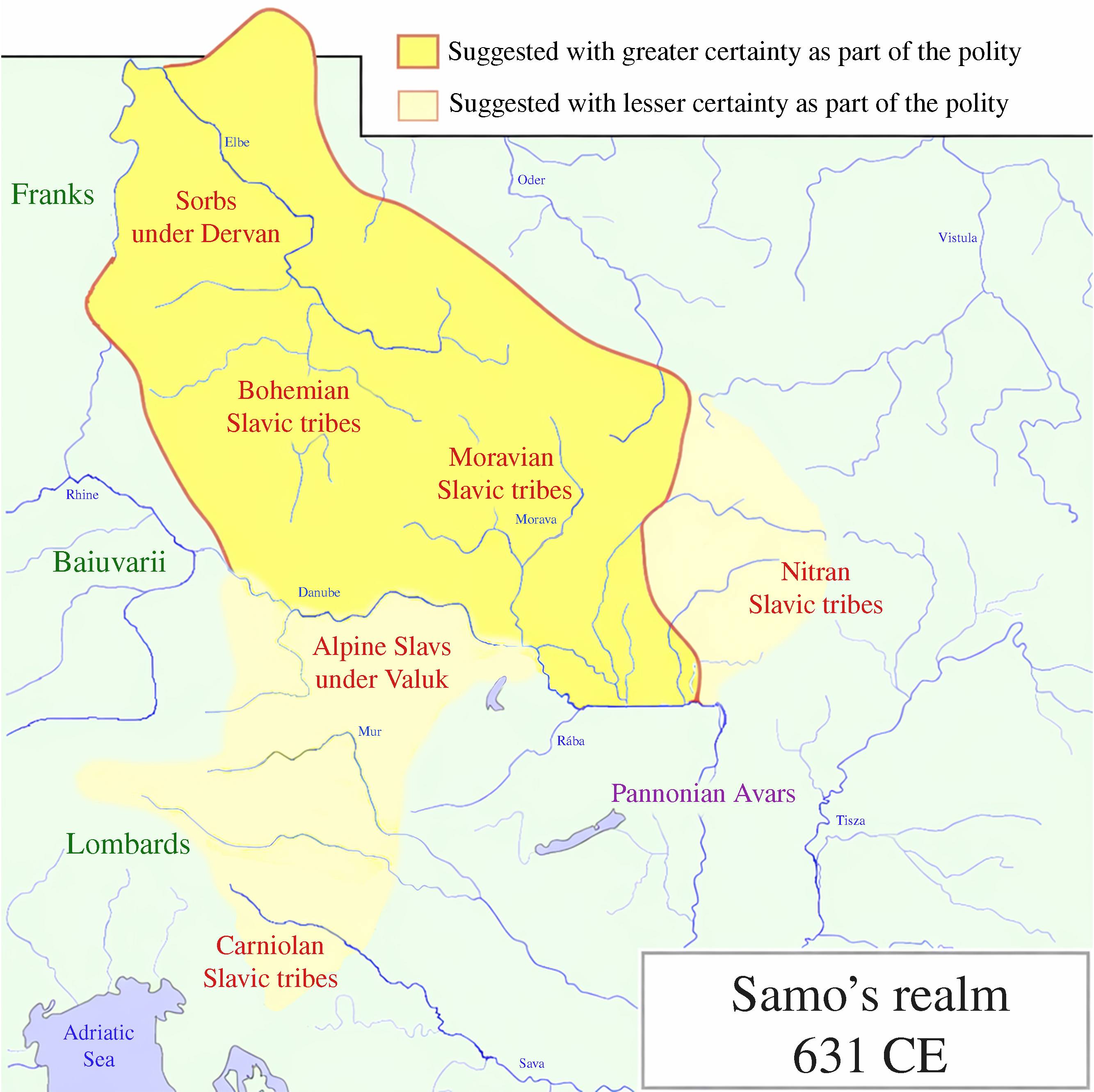
Sorbian settlements under Dervan as part of the Slavic tribal union of Samo, ca. 631–632

The Polabian Slavs partly replaced the Germanic tribes who had emigrated to the area by the 6th century during the migration period. According to radiocarbon dating, the first Slavs reached southwestern Hungary, Suchohrad in western Slovakia, and Prague in Czechia in the first third of the 6th century, and Regensburg in northeastern Bavaria in 568. The earliest dating of Prague-type pottery, sites between the Elbe and Saale, and Sukow-type pottery in northeastern Germany was found to be from the 590s. However, palynology and other evidence show that the land in modern-day Germany became forested and not well resettled by the Slavs, with most material and sites dating from the 8th century.

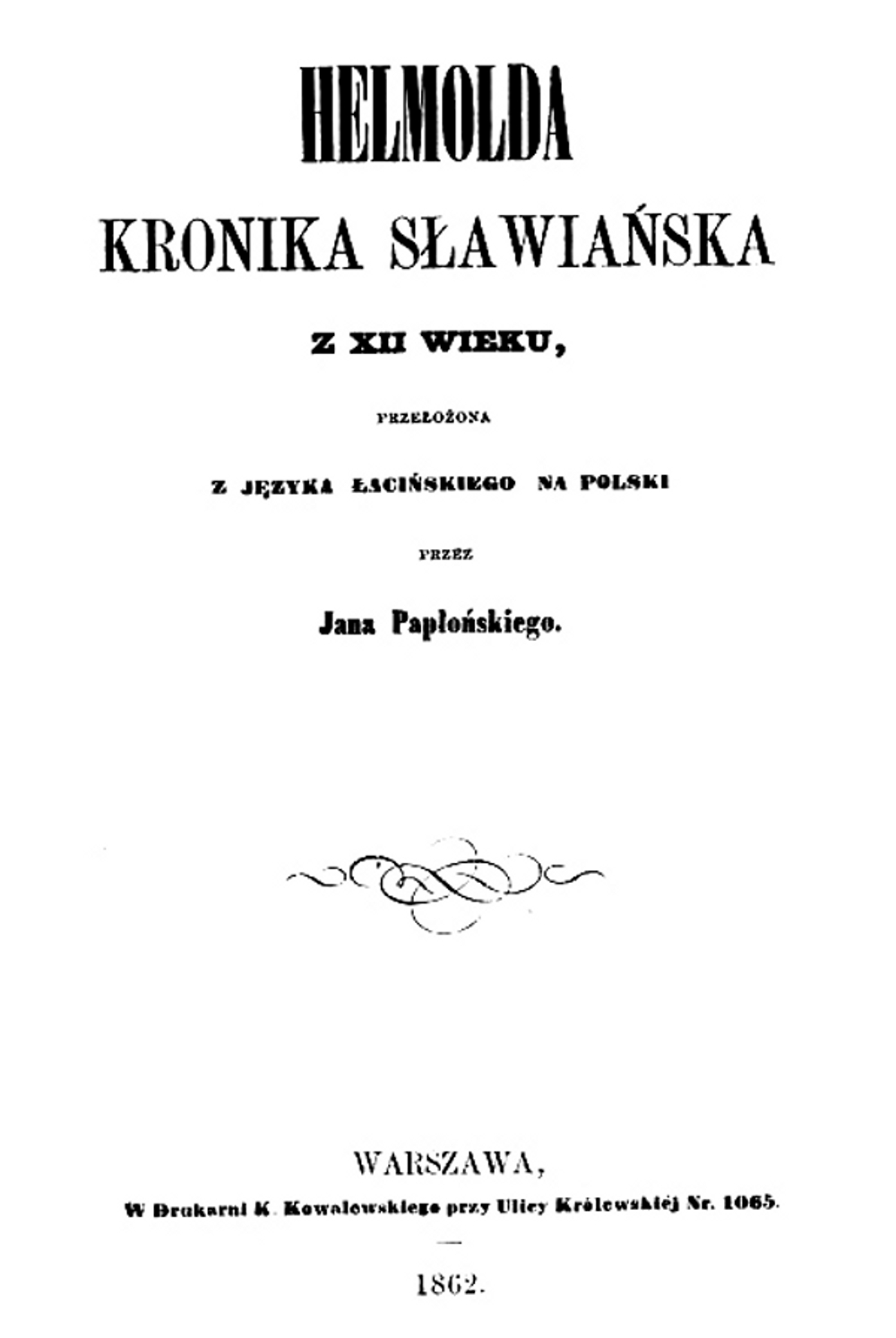
Primary source on the history of the Polabian Slavs: the 12th-century Chronica Slavorum by Helmold, translated into Polish by Jan Papłoński in 1862.

By the first half of the 7th century, local Slavic rulers had already established complex relations with the neighboring Frankish kings, as recorded by the Frankish Chronicle of Fredegar. The Chronicle mentions "Dervan, the duke of the Sorbs, who are said to be Slavs as well" (Latin: Dervanus dux gente Surbiorum, que ex genere Sclavinorum erant), noting that he was initially subordinate to the Frankish king for a long time, and then joined the Slavic tribal union of Prince Samo.

The area of Slavic settlement was largely stable by the 8th century. Charlemagne enlisted the Obotrites as allies in his campaign against the rebellious Saxons of Holstein. Many of the Slavic tribes became dependencies of the Carolingian Empire, and the Franks created the Sorbian March to defend against the Sorbs. In his Vita Karoli Magni, Einhard describes an expedition into Slavic territory led by Charlemagne himself in 798. The Franks invaded the Veleti, called Wilzi by Einhard (their endonym was the Welatabians) because of the latter's continuous expeditions into the lands of the Obodrites, who were allies of the Franks against the Saxons. The Royal Frankish Annals also mention Sorbs, Obodrites, and other Polabian Slavs in relation to various political events on eastern Carolingian borders during the 8th and 9th centuries.

German campaigns against the Slavs began in earnest during the Ottonian dynasty. Henry the Fowler attacked them in several campaigns with his cavalry. During the reigns of Henry and his son Otto I, several marches were established to guard the eastern acquisitions, such as the Billung March to the north and the Marca Geronis to the south. After Gero's death in 965, the Marca Geronis was divided into the Northern March, the March of Lusatia, and the Thuringian March, the last being divided into the marches of Zeitz, Merseburg, and Meissen. Bishoprics such as Magdeburg, Brandenburg, and Havelberg were founded to support the conversion of the Slavs to Christianity.

In 983, the year following Otto II's defeat at the Battle of Stilo, the pagan Slavs rebelled against the Germans. The Hevelli and Liutizi destroyed the Bishoprics of Havelberg and Brandenburg, and the Obotrites (Mstivoj) destroyed Hamburg. Some Slavs advanced across the Elbe into Saxon territory, but they retreated when the Christian Duke of Poland, Mieszko I, attacked them from the east. The Holy Roman Empire retained only nominal control over the Slavic territories between the Elbe and the Oder. Despite the efforts of Christian missionaries, most Polabian Slavs saw Jesus as a "German god" and remained pagan.

In the 11th century, the Obotrite prince Udo and his son Gottschalk expanded their realm by unifying the Obotrite tribes and conquering some of the Liutizi. They encouraged the establishments of bishoprics to support Christian missionary activity. However, a revolt in 1066 led to the murder of Gottschalk and his replacement by the pagan Kruto of Wagria. Gottschalk's son Henry eventually killed Kruto in 1093.

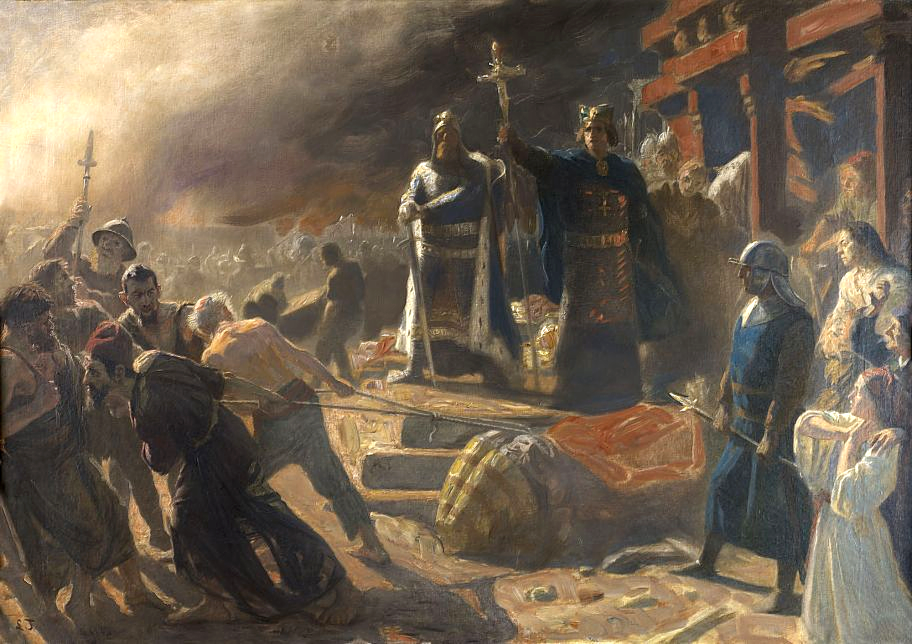
Danish Bishop Absalon destroys the idol of Slavic god Svantevit at Arkona in a painting by Laurits Tuxen.

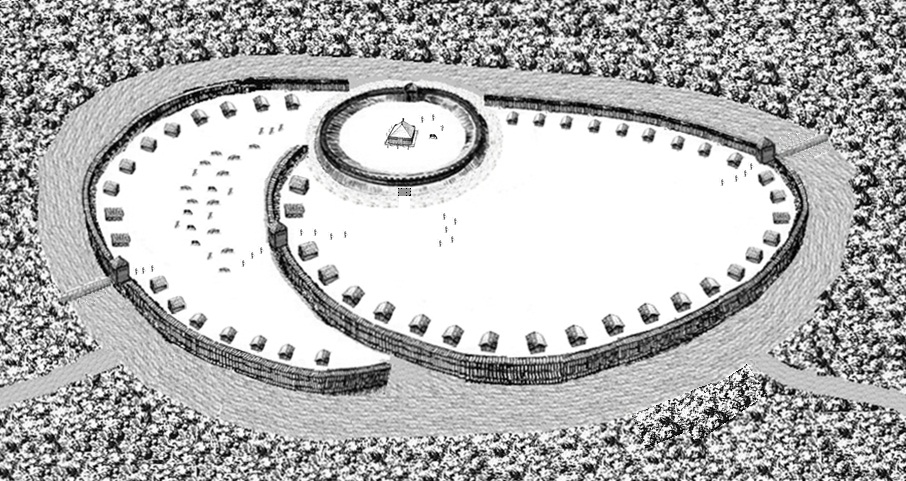
Reconstruction of Slavic gord near Neubrandenburg

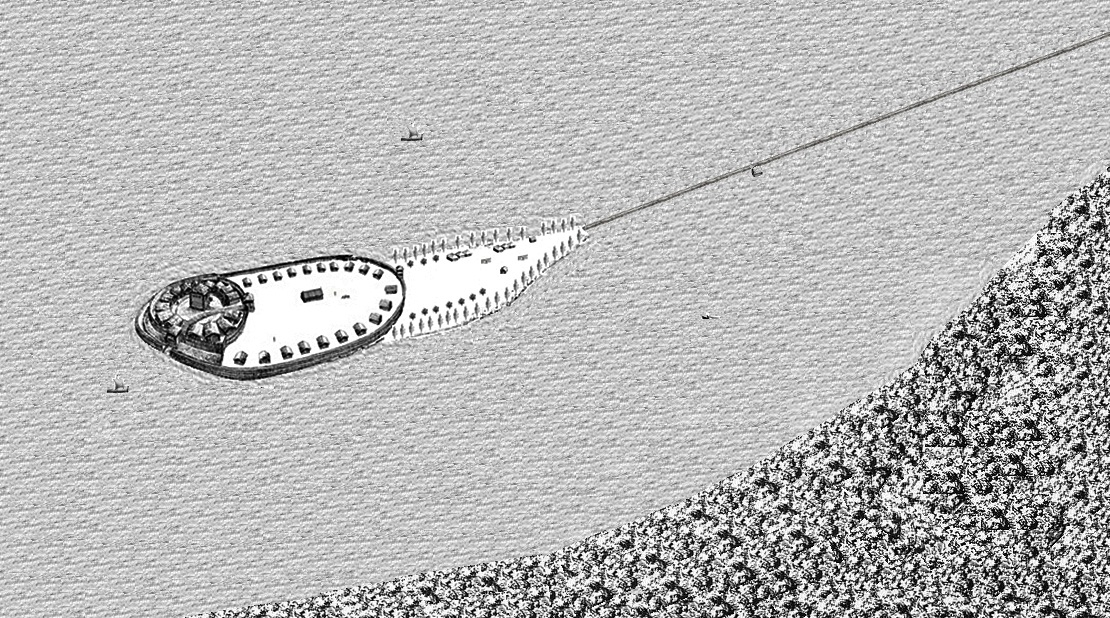
Reconstruction of Slavic gord at the Burgwallinsel (Gord Island)

From 1140 to 1143, Holsatian nobles advanced into Wagria to permanently settle in the lands of the pagan Wagri. Count Adolf II of Holstein and Henry of Badewide took control of Polabian settlements at Liubice and Racisburg. Impressed with the success of the First Crusade, Saxons began calling for one against their Slav neighbors. The Wendish Crusade of 1147, concurrent to the Second Crusade, was largely unsuccessful, although it devastated Liutizi lands and also saw forced baptisms. The campaign did secure Saxon control of Wagria and Polabia, however. The Obotrites were largely at peace with the Saxons during the following decade, although Slavic pirates raided Denmark.

Beginning in the late 1150s, King Valdemar the Great of Denmark enlisted the aid of Duke Henry the Lion of Saxony against the Slavs; their cooperation led to the death of the Obotrite prince Niklot in 1160. The two Christian lords distributed much of the conquered territory among their vassals. When Niklot's exiled son Pribislav engineered an Obotrite rebellion, the pair retaliated by occupying Demmin and warding off Pribislav's Liutizian allies.

After conquering Wagria and Polabia during the 1140s, Saxon nobles attempted to expel the "native" Slavs and replace them with Saxon and Flemish settlers. The 1164 Obotrite revolt led by Pribislav convinced Henry the Lion that keeping the Slavs as allies would be less troublesome. The duke returned the Christian Pribislav to power as Prince of Mecklenburg, Kessin, and Rostock, and a vassal of the Saxons. Pribislav bequeathed his lands to the Saxon Albert the Bear upon his death in 1150, leading to the establishment of the Margraviate of Brandenburg.

Tactics and weaponry were decisive in Denmark's campaigns against the eastern Polabian Slavs. The Danes employed quick coastal and river raids, tactics similar to those of the Vikings. Although they lacked siege experience, they were able to cripple Slavic regions by burning crops and unwalled suburbs. Slav counterattacks were repulsed by crossbows and Norwegian longbows. The Danes occupied Rugia in 1168, conquering the Rani stronghold of Arkona. Similar to Henry's reinstatement of Pribislav as a Saxon vassal, Valdemar allowed the Rani prince Jaromar to rule as a Christian Danish vassal. However, after Valdemar refused to share Rugia with Henry, the Saxon duke enlisted the aid of the Obotrite confederacy and the Liutizi against the Danes; Valdemar ended the conflict by paying Henry in 1171.

Alarmed at the expansion of Henry's power, Emperor Frederick Barbarossa deposed the Saxon duke and redistributed his lands in 1180–81. The withdrawal of Saxon support left the Liutizi and their Pomeranian supporters vulnerable to the Danish fleet. A Slavic fleet attempting to reclaim Rugia was crushed at the Bay of Greifswald on 19 May 1184. Danish monks engaged in missionary activity in Pomeranian abbeys, and Prince Bogislaw I surrendered to King Canute VI in 1185 to become the Danish king's vassal.

The Lusatian Sorbs remained independent to a large extent. They were temporarily subdued by Charlemagne, but when he died, their links with the Franks were broken. In a series of bloody wars between 929 and 963, their lands were conquered by King Henry the Fowler and his son Otto the Great and were incorporated into the Kingdom of Germany. By the 14th century, the majority of Slavs living in the area had been Germanized and assimilated. However, the Sorbs, the descendants of the Milceni and the Lusici, have retained their identity within Lusatia, a region divided between the German states of Brandenburg and Saxony.

The Slavic language was spoken by the descendants of the Drevani in the area of the lower Elbe until the early 18th century.

== Society ==
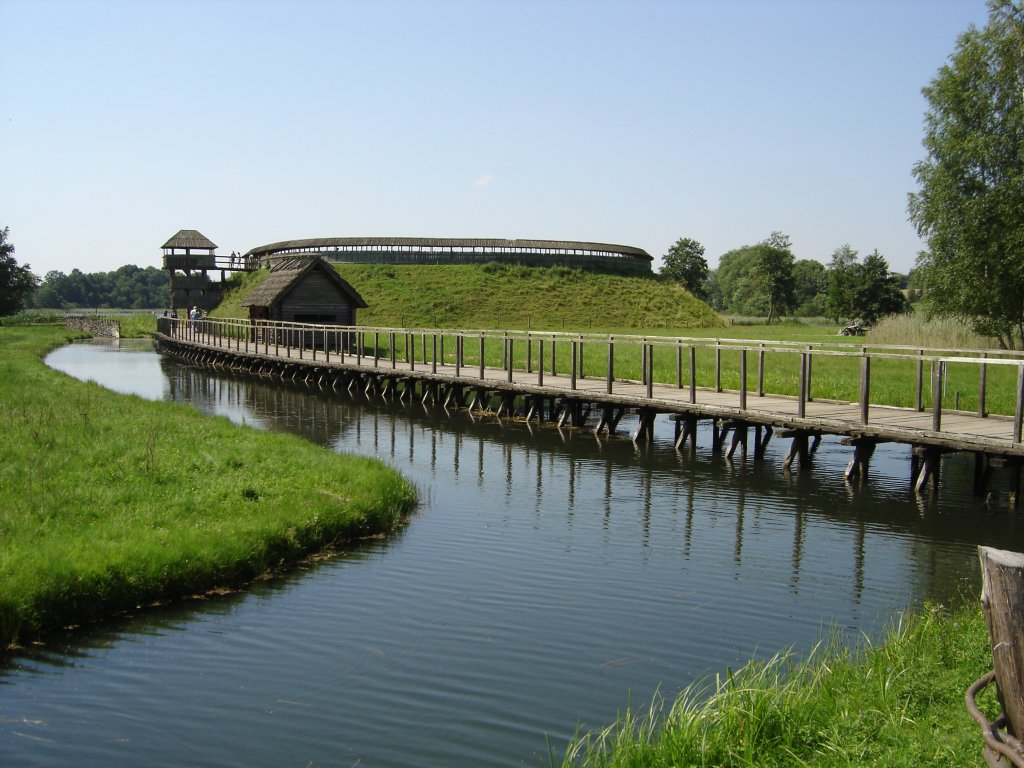
Reconstruction of Slavic gord in Groß Raden, Mecklenburg

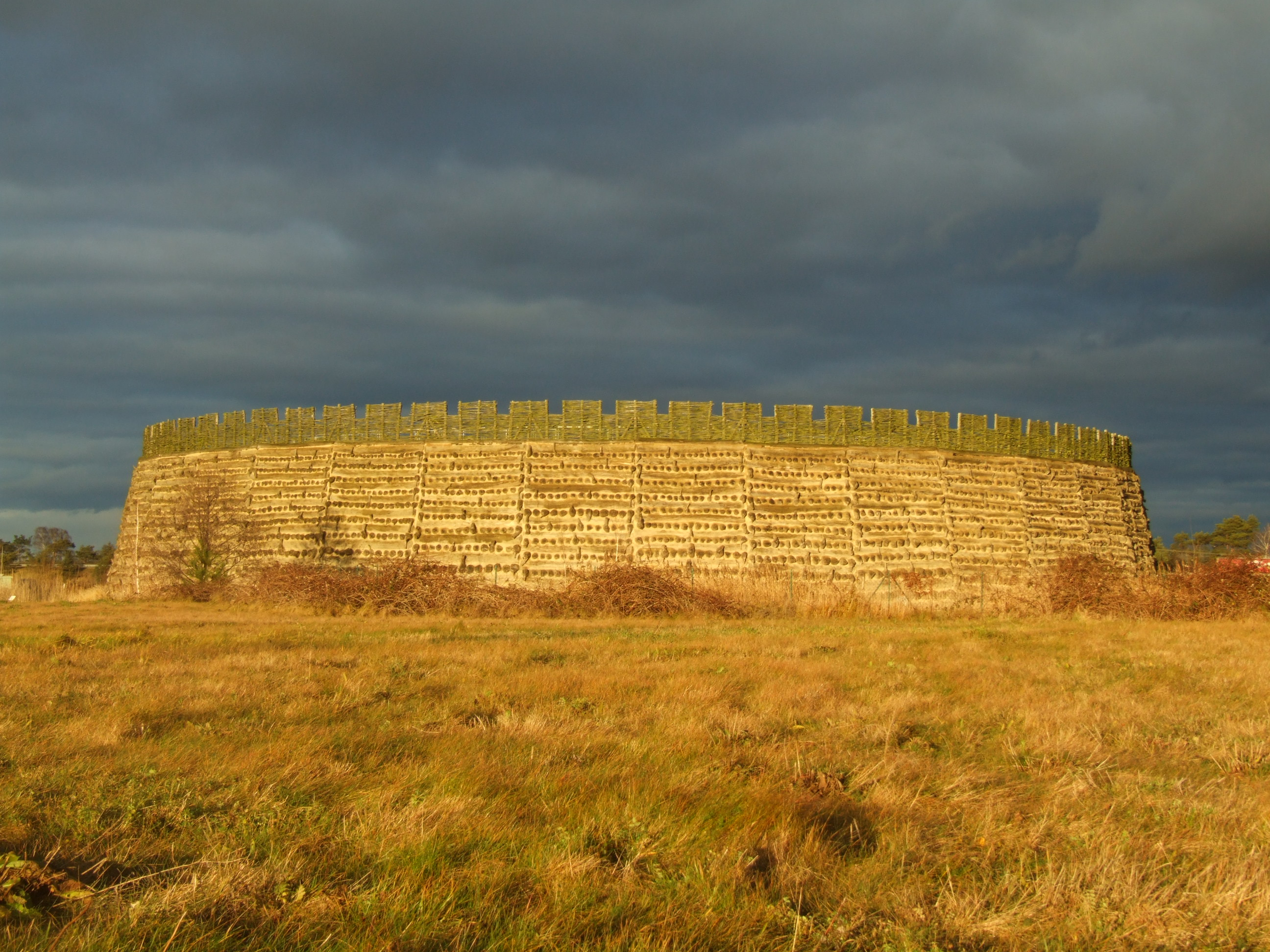
Reconstruction of Slavic gord in Lusatia - Raddusch, Vetschau

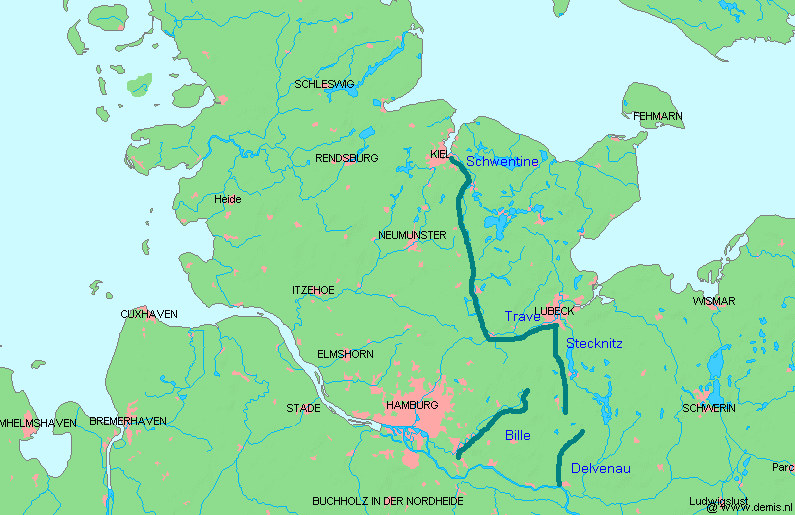
The Limes Saxoniae border between the Saxons and the Lechites Obotrites, established ca. 810 in present-day Schleswig-Holstein

=== Princes ===
A Polabian prince was known as a knez. His power was relatively greater in Slavic society than those of Danish or Swedish kings in their kingdoms, although it was not absolute. He was the general leader of his tribe and was foremost among its nobles, holding much of the forested hinterland and expecting reverence from his warriors. However, his authority largely extended only to the territory controlled by his governor, or voivod. Each voivod governed small territories based around fortifications.

Princely power often differed between tribes. The Obodrite prince Henryk was able to maintain a sizable army ca. 1100 at the expense of the towns, and the importance of the knez among the Obodrites only increased after his death. The prince of the Rani, on the other hand, was limited by the local senate, which was led by the high priest at Cape Arkona; the Rani knez was essentially first among the tribe's landowners.

=== Towns ===
The power of the prince and his governors was often restricted by the river towns, known to chroniclers as civitates, especially within the territory of the Veleti. Polabian towns were centered on small earthworks arranged in circles or ovals. The gord was situated at the highest altitude of the town and held a barracks, citadel, and princely residence. It was often protected by a moat, walls, and wooden towers. Below the gord, but still within the town walls, was the urbs or suburbium, which held the residences for the nobility and merchants. The towns often held wooden temples for Slavic gods within the urbs. Outside of the walls were homes for the peasantry. With the exception of Arkona on Rügen, few Polabian towns on the Baltic coast were built near the shore, out of concern for pirates and raiders. While not highly populated compared to Flanders or Italy, the Polabian towns were relatively large for the Baltic region, such as in comparison to those of Scandinavia.

=== Peasantry ===
The majority of Polabian Slavs were peasants in small villages who engaged in agriculture (grains, flax) and animal husbandry (poultry, cattle). Some villagers were fishermen, beekeepers, or trappers. Farmland was divided into a unit called a kuritz (Latin: uncus), for which peasants paid grain taxes to the voivod.

=== Military ===
Polabian society developed during the 9th and 10th centuries under pressure from the Holy Roman Empire and the Vikings of Scandinavia. They were often forced to pay tribute to the kings of Denmark, Catholic bishops, and imperial margraves. Polabian society became militarized and its leaders began organizing armed forces and defenses. Many Polabian magnates lived in forest fortresses, while towns were inhabited by warriors and burghers.

The magnates often raided Germanic territories or engaged in piracy. In times of large-scale war, the knez took overall command. The prince's voivod ensured military service from the warriors and taxes from the peasantry. While the countryside provided land forces, the towns were known for their longships, which were lighter and lower than those used by the Danes and Swedes.

From a distance, Polabian fleets resembled those of the Scandinavians, although targets would recognize the Slavs' closely cropped hair and shrieking battle cries when they grew close. Polabian cavalry used small horses, which were effective in quick raiding campaigns but less effective against the Saxon and Danish heavy cavalry.

=== Religion ===
Religion was an important aspect of Polabian society. Much of their territory was dotted with holy places in nature to which the Slavs could pray and make offerings to Slavic gods. The priesthood was an important class that created images and objects of worship. Polabian towns often included elaborate temples often visited for offerings and pilgrimages. In contrast, priests in the countryside often lived meagerly.

== See also ==
- Leipzig group
- Tornow group
- Slavic settlement of the Eastern Alps

== Bibliography ==
- Barkowski, Robert F. (2015). Słowianie połabscy: Dzieje zagłady. Warszawa: Bellona.
- Christiansen, Eric (1997) [1980]. The Northern Crusades (2nd ed.). London: Penguin Books.
- Curta, Florin (1997). "Slavs in Fredegar and Paul the Deacon: Medieval gens or scourge of God?" (PDF). Early Medieval Europe. 6 (2): 141–167.
- Curta, Florin (2001). The Making of the Slavs: History and Archaeology of the Lower Danube Region, c. 500–700. Cambridge: Cambridge University Press.
- Curta, Florin (2019). Eastern Europe in the Middle Ages (500-1300). Leiden and Boston: Brill.
- Goldberg, Eric J. (2006). Struggle for Empire: Kingship and Conflict under Louis the German, 817-876. Ithaca, NY: Cornell University Press.
- Herrmann, Joachim (1970). Die Slawen in Deutschland: Geschichte und Kultur der slawischen Stämme westlich von Oder und Neisse vom 6. bis 12. Jahrhundert (in German). Berlin: Akademie-Verlag GmbH.
- Kazanski, Michel (2020). "Archaeology of the Slavic Migrations" (PDF). Encyclopedia of Slavic Languages and Linguistics Online. Leiden-Boston: Brill. pp. 1–22.
- Krusch, Bruno, ed. (1888). Fredegarii et Aliorum Chronica: Vitae Sanctorum. Monumenta Germaniae Historica: Scriptores Rerum Merovingicarum. Vol. 2. Hannover: Impensis bibliopolii Hahniani.
- Reuter, Timothy (2013) [1991]. Germany in the Early Middle Ages c. 800–1056 (2nd ed.). London and New York: Routledge.
- Scholz, Bernhard W.; Rogers, Barbara, eds. (1970). Carolingian Chronicles: Royal Frankish Annals and Nithard's Histories. Ann Arbor: University of Michigan Press.
- Schutz, Herbert (2004). The Carolingians in Central Europe, Their History, Arts, and Architecture: A Cultural History of Central Europe, 750-900. Leiden-Boston: Brill.
- Stieldorf, Andrea (2026) [2012]. Marken und Markgrafen: Studien zur Grenzsicherung durch die fränkisch-deutschen Herrscher (2nd ed.). Wiesbaden: Harrassowitz Verlag.
- Stone, Gerald (2016). Slav Outposts in Central European History: The Wends, Sorbs and Kashubs. London and New York: Bloomsbury Academic.
- Zeuß, Kaspar (1837). Die Deutschen und die Nachbarstämme (in German). Munich: Ignaz Joseph Lentner.
