= Polabia =

Polabia may refer to

- in a generic sense, the parts of north-east Germany occupied between prehistory and the early modern era by the Polabian Slavs, or;
- the more specific territory of one of those peoples, the Polabians (tribe).
