= Sigrid of Denmark =

Sigrid of Denmark may refer to:

- Sigrid the Haughty
- Sigrid Svendsdatter
