= Polabi =

Polabi may refer to:

- Polabians (tribe), medieval West Slavic tribe
- Polabí, region of the Czech Republic
