= Henry (Obotrite prince) =

- Prince of the Obotrites
- Born: before 1066; Mecklenburg
- Died: 22 March or 7 June 1127
- Burial: Lüneburg, Germany
- Spouse: Slavina
- Issue: Woldemar; Mstivoj; Canute; Sventipolk
- Dynasty: Nakonids
- Father: Gottschalk
- Mother: Sigrid Svendsdatter
- Religion: Roman Catholic

Henry (Latin: Henricus; before 1066 – 22 March or 7 June 1127 (Note: His date of death is variously placed in March or June and the year is sometimes found as 1125 or 1128.)) was an Obotrite prince or king (1093–1127) from the Nakonid dynasty; he was regarded by contemporaries as "King of the Slavs" (rex Slavorum). The Obotrite realm reached its greatest area during Henry's rule, extending from the Elbe to the Oder and from the Havelland to the Baltic Sea.

== Origin and early life ==
Henry was the second son of the Obotrite prince Gottschalk, a Christian who was killed in a Slavic pagan uprising in 1066, and Sigrid Svendsdatter; Henry and his half-brother Budivoj were subsequently raised in Denmark and Lüneburg, respectively. The Obotrite lands passed to the leader of the uprising, the pagan Kruto. While Henry remained passive, the Saxon-supported Budivoj was killed by Kruto at Plön. Once Kruto reached old age, he was forced to defend against an invasion by Henry with Danish support in 1090. Kruto could not prevent Henry from harrying and plundering the Wagrian coastline. The pressured Kruto agreed to meet with Henry and grant him a portion of the Obotrite realm in 1093. Although Kruto planned to have Henry assassinated during the visit, Henry succeeded in having Kruto killed with the assistance of Kruto's wife Slavina. Marrying the widow, Henry led a Slav-Saxon army to victory in the Battle of Schmilau in 1093. According to Helmold, the glare of the setting sun prevented the Slavs from winning the battle.

== Prince of the Obotrites ==
Instead of Mecklenburg, Henry chose Liubice, near the site of the later Lübeck, to be his residence. It was selected because of its proximity to the Wagri, the Obotrites proper, and the Polabians. Henry remained on good terms with his Danish and Saxon neighbors, especially Duke Lothar von Supplinburg and Adolf I of Holstein. He invited foreign merchants, especially Saxons, to Liubice. Helmold of Bosau reported that Henry encouraged his subjects to engage in agriculture. The prince allowed the minting of coins depicting a wall and tower on one side and a double cross on the other.

=== Campaigns ===
Helmold records Henry as campaigning against the Rani, Kissini, Circipani, Liutizi, and Western Pomeranians to render them tributary. He was forced to defend against a surprised seaborne assault by the pagan Rani of Rugia ca. 1100; after being reinforced by Holsatian Saxons, Henry forced the Rani to pay tribute. In the winters of 1123/24 and 1124/25 Henry led expeditions against the Rani after they killed his son Woldemar and refused to pay tribute. Henry led 2,000–6,000 men during the first campaign; Saxons from Holstein and Stormarn marched alongside his Slavic troops. The first winter campaign ended when the Rani priests paid an immense tribute. The second campaign was coordinated with Duke Lothar of Saxony. Henry also suppressed revolts by the Brisani and Hevelli in the winter of 1100/01. While Henry was besieging Havelberg for a month, his son Mistue plundered the neighboring Linones with 200 Saxons and 300 Slavs.

=== Conflict with Denmark ===
According to Saxo Grammaticus, King Niels of Denmark (Note: He was king from 1104 to 1134.) deprived Henry of the inheritance of his mother's lands in Denmark. In retribution, Henry launched large scale raids into Southern Denmark around Schleswig region and proved to be a menace to the Danes, devastating the territory and leaving it "without one farmer". Saxo also recounts usage of the Wendic battle strategy of tiring out the enemy by circling them on horseback as well as hit and run tactics effective against the armoured opponents, leaving Danish retaliatory attacks unsuccessful because they had not yet mastered transportation of mounted units by ship and had to fight Henry's forces on foot.

=== Christianization efforts ===
A Christian, Henry had a chapel built inside his castle as well as a church in the colony of merchants. Keeping in mind the pagan revolt of 1066, Henry did not force Christianity upon his subjects, who remained predominantly pagan. In 1126 Vicelin came to Liubice and asked Henry for permission to preach Christianity amongst the Slavs. After receiving Henry's support, Vicelin returned to Saxony to prepare for the missionary expedition. Henry had granted the Slavic peoples freedom to practice their paganism and he himself and his court were some of the only Christians in his territory. During the missionary's absence, Henry died and was buried in Lüneburg, though Helmold is silent concerning the manner of his death.

== Legacy ==
Eastern tribes such as the Hevelli and Liutizi took advantage of Henry's death to assert their independence. Henry's elder sons, Woldemar and Mstivoj (1127), had predeceased him. His younger sons, Canute and Sventipolk (also Svatopluk or Zwentibold), fought over their inheritance. When Canute was killed in 1128 at Lütjenburg, Sventipolk succeeded in taking over the entire country. Vicelinus finally sent priests to Liubice, but after this was conquered by the Rani and destroyed, the priests fled to Faldera (Neumünster). Sventipolk was killed in the same year, and his son Swineke was killed in 1129 at Ertheneburg on the Elbe. Emperor Lothair III awarded the title "King of the Obotrites" to Canute Lavard in 1129, but he was murdered in 1131. The Obotrite realm was ultimately partitioned between the pagans Niklot and Pribislav.
