= Buku =

Buku may refer to:

- Bucu, a German island fortress
- Buku, short name for Buku-Larrnggay Mulka Centre at Yirrkala, Northern Territory, Australia
- Buzhu, a legendary ancestor of the imperial Zhou dynasty

== See also ==
- BUKU Music + Art Project
