= Adolf I of Holstein =

12th Century Count of Holstein and Shauenburg

- Died: 13 November 1130
- Buried: Minden
- Noble family: House of Schauenburg
- Spouse: Hildewa
- Issue: Adolf II of Holstein

Adolf I (died 13 November 1130) was the first Count of Schauenburg from 1106 and the second Count of Holstein from 1111. He made an important contribution to the colonisation and Germanisation of the lands north of the Elbe.

He was appointed to hold as fiefs Holstein and Stormarn, including Hamburg, by Lothair, Duke of Saxony, in 1111. By this appointment Adolf became the leader of the defence of Germany against the Wagri. Allied with Henry, the prince of the Obotrites, he repeatedly waged war on Wagria and the Rugians. After Henry's death (1127), Adolf remained allied with his sons Canute and Sventepolk, but they were soon dead and Lothair, by then King of Germany, had made Canute Lavard, a Danish prince, Duke of Schleswig. Feeling his authority threatened by the Danish upstart, Adolf attacked his castle of Albergs, captured the garrison, and destroyed its defences. He left his counties intact to his second son, Adolf II, since his eldest, Hartung, had been killed in the Second Battle of Chlumec in 1126.

== Sources ==
- "Adolf I. (Graf von Holstein)." Allgemeine Deutsche Biographie by the Historischen Kommission of the Bayrischen Akademie der Wissenschaften, Volume 1, from page 105, Digitale Volltext-Ausgabe in Wikisource (Retrieved 10 July 2007, 18:09 UTC).

Adolphus of Schauenburg House of Schaumburg Died: 13 November 1130, buried in Minden
Regnal titles
Preceded by Godfrey	Count of Holstein; 1111–1130	Succeeded by Adolf II
New title	Count of Schauenburg; 1106–1130	Succeeded by Adolf II
