= Budivoj =

Budivoj, Buthue, or Butue (Polish Budziwoj) (died 1071–1075) was the eldest son of Gottschalk, an Obotrite prince, by a mistress. He allied with the dukes of Saxony in order to recover the power and position of his father, lost since Gottschalk's death (1066) to the pagan Kruto.

Between 1071 and 1075, Budivoj was led into a trap at Plune by Kruto and killed. According to Helmold, Pribislav was probably his son. Budivoj was praised by contemporaries and later writers for his hospitality and Christianity. Budivoj's younger brother Henry eventually avenged Gottschalk's death and took over the Abodrite lands.

== Sources ==
- Thompson, James Westfall (1928). Feudal Germany, Volume II. New York: Frederick Ungar Publishing.
