= Sigrid Svendsdatter =

Danish princess

- Died: After 1066
- Spouse: Gottschalk
- Issue: Henry Gottskalksøn
- House: Estridsen
- Father: Sweyn II of Denmark

Sigrid Svendsdatter (died after 1066) was a Danish princess, the illegitimate daughter of King Sweyn II of Denmark.

She married Obotrite Prince Gottschalk (died 1066), who was in service of Canute the Great since 1029, and who was assisted by her father in regaining his father's principality. It is likely that they married in connection to this. She became the mother of Henrik Gottskalksøn. In 1066, her spouse was deposed in a rebellion. Sigrid and her female servants were captured in Mecklenburg, after which she was, according to traditional reports, "whipped" out of the country. Her life after 1066 is not documented. In 1100, she was surely dead, as her son laid claim to her inherited lands in Denmark.

== Sources ==
- Dansk Biografisk Leksikon, København: J.H. Schultz Forlag 1932–44.
