= Wagri =

West Slavic tribe

The Wagri, Wagiri, or Wagrians were a tribe of Polabian Slavs inhabiting Wagria, or eastern Holstein in northern Germany, from the ninth to twelfth centuries. They were a constituent tribe of the Obodrite confederacy.

== History ==
In the Slavic uprisings of 983 and c. 1040 under Gottschalk, Wagria was wasted and ruined. Many German towns and churches were destroyed and the region was largely depopulated. In 1066, the Wagri allied with the Wilzi in storming the line of Saxon burgwarden from Mecklenburg to Schwerin and into German territory as deep as Hamburg. Around 1090, the still pagan Wagri and Liutizi came under the sway of the Rani-born Kruto. Each tribe elected its own chief who was subordinate to Kruto. In 1093, the Christian Obodrites under Henry, aided by some Saxons and the local Low German population, defeated Kruto at the Battle of Schmilau near Ratzeburg. The Wagri were brought to tributary status once more.

The Christianisation of Wagria began under Unwan, Archbishop of Bremen, in the 1020s. Vicelin of Oldenburg, a Christian priest, first began to evangelise the Wagri and Wilzi with the permission of Henry, who was reigning from Lübeck, around 1126. In the years which followed Vicelin's mission, the Emperor Lothair II thoroughly encastellated Wagria and Canute Lavard and the Holsteiners invaded it and took Pribislav and Niklot, the Wagrian leaders, away in chains.

In 1142, Henry the Lion and Adolf II of Holstein divided the newly conquered Slav lands between them. Wagria with its castle of Sigberg went to Adolf, while Polabia with Ratzeburg went to Henry. The Trave divided the regions. There followed this division a great influx of German colonists. During the Wendish Crusade of 1147, the Wagri attacked recently founded colonies of Flemings and Frisians, but this is the last that is heard of their resistance to Germanisation.

== See also ==
- List of medieval Slavic tribes
- Wagria

== Sources ==
- Thompson, James Westfall. Feudal Germany, Volume II. New York: Frederick Ungar Publishing Co., 1928.
