= Kruto the Wend =

Prince of Wagria, modern Germany (d. 1093)

Kruto the Wend (or Cruto) (died 1093), son of Grin or Grinus, was a prince of Wagria. James Westfall Thompson believed his family belonged to the Rani of Rugia.

Gottschalk, a Christian Obodrite prince who was married to the daughter of his Danish ally Sven Estridson, had subdued the Obodrite and some Lutician tribes in the 1050s. In 1066, Kruto succeeded in an uprising initiated by the Obodrite nobility and supported by the Luticians, against Gottschalk and his Saxon dukes Ordulf and Magnus. Gottschalk was slain, and his sons Budivoj and Henry exiled to Saxony and Denmark. Kruto made his capital out of a large palisaded fortress at Buku, an island in the confluence of the Trave and Wakenitz rivers and site of the later Lübeck.

In 1074 or 1075, Budivoj, a son of Gottschalk, with a band of Holsteiners sent by Magnus, attacked Kruto's stronghold at Plön, which had been purposefully left undefended. The next day, it was surrounded by Slavic forces, who made the Saxons surrender, after which they were massacred. Budivoj was killed.

Until his death in 1093, Nordalbingia, including Holstein, Sturmaria, and Ditmarsch, was subject to his pagan rule. For decades, Magnus, Eric of Denmark, and the margraves of the Northern March (Udo II, Henry I, and Udo III) struggled to subdue Kruto, but only Eric came close.

Kruto's principality was weak internally, however, because the vassal Slavs, such as the Liutizi, continued to elect their own chiefs subordinate to him. As well, the Christian Obodrites were secretly allied with the Saxons to bring about his downfall. At a banquet at which Kruto intended to kill Gottschalk's son Henry, his guest, Henry and Kruto's wife Slavina instead killed him. Immediately after his death, Henry, a Christian Obodrite prince, led a combined Slav-Saxon army to victory over the Wends at the Battle of Schmilau and subjected the Wagri and Liutizi to tribute again.

== Sources ==
- Thompson, James Westfall. Feudal Germany, Volume II. New York: Frederick Ungar Publishing Co., 1928.
