= Selpoli =

Regions with significant populations
- Silesia (Poland)

Related ethnic groups
- Lusatian tribes

The Selpoli (Note: Polish: Słupianie) was a West Slavic Lusatian tribe, that in the 10th and 11th centuries, inhabited the area to the east from Lusatian Neisse river.

== History ==
Selpoli was a West Slavic Lusatian tribe, that in the 10th and 11th centuries, inhabited the area to the east from Lusatian Neisse river. Between 936 and 940, together with other tribes, they rebelled against Saxons.

The tribe was noted three times, in the Thietmar's Chronicle, an 11th-century chronicle written by Thietmar of Merseburg. They were noted before 963, in 990, and in 1008.
