= Oldenburg in Holstein =

- Town
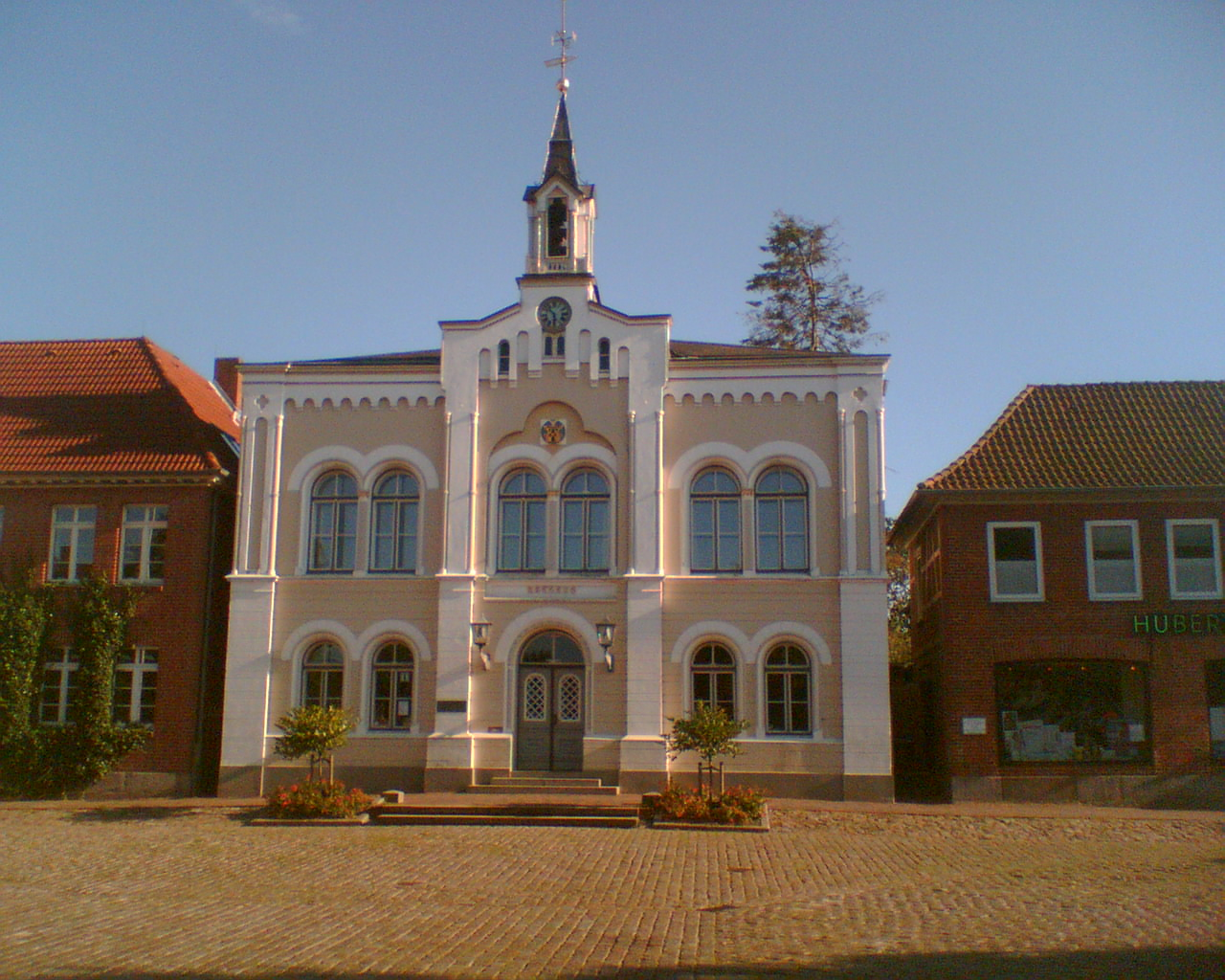
- Town hall

- Flag Coat of arms

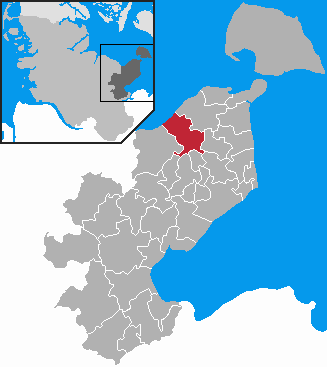
- Location of Oldenburg in Holstein within Ostholstein district
- Interactive map of Oldenburg in Holstein
- Location within Germany Location within Schleswig-Holstein
- Coordinates: 54°18′N 10°53′E
- Country: Germany
- State: Schleswig-Holstein
- District: Ostholstein

Government
  - Mayor: Jörg Saba

Area
  - Total: 39.69 km^{2} (15.32 sq mi)
- Elevation: 8 m (26 ft)

Population (2025-12-31)
  - Total: 9,724
  - Density: 245.0/km^{2} (634.5/sq mi)
- Time zone: UTC+01:00 (CET)
  - Summer (DST): UTC+02:00 (CEST)
- Postal codes: 23758
- Dialling codes: 04361
- Vehicle registration: OH
- Website: www.oldenburg-holstein.de

Oldenburg in Holstein (German: [ˈɔldn̩bʊʁk ʔɪn ˈhɔlʃtaɪn]) is a German town near the southwestern coast of the Baltic Sea, approximately 50 km east of Kiel and 50 km northeast of Lübeck. It belongs to the historical region of Holstein, in the present-day German state of Schleswig-Holstein.

Oldenburg was the chief town of the Wagrians, one of the Slavic peoples that migrated as far west as the river Elbe in or after the 6th century (see Völkerwanderung), also known as Wends and Obotrites. They arrived about A.D. 700 and the Slavic name was Starigard or Stargard, meaning "Old Settlement", "Old Castle", "Old City/Town"; the German name Oldenburg is of Low German origin and carries the same meaning. The Obotrites were allies of Charlemagne. Emperor Otto I established the bishopric of Oldenburg under Adaldag, archbishop of Hamburg.

To the Northern Germanic Vikings, the city was known as Brandehuse, i.e. "the burned houses", indicating the bellicose times.

For centuries, Starigard/Oldenburg remained the Slavic competitor of Hedeby on the Baltic trade, until the counts Adolph I and Adolph II of Schauenburg and Holstein, supported by Henry the Lion, finally defeated the Wends during the first half of the 12th century.

The modern town has a partnership with Bergen auf Rügen in Mecklenburg-Vorpommern.

== Twin towns – sister cities ==
Oldenburg in Holstein is twinned with:

- Bergen auf Rügen, Germany (1990)
- Palanga, Lithuania (2016)
- Blain, France (2017)

== Notable natives of Oldenburg in Holstein ==
- Johann Liss (c.1590-c.1630) Baroque painter, active mainly in Venice
- Sebastian Schmidt (born 1993), German politician

== See also ==
- Curmsun Disc
