= Wagria =

Area in northeastern Holstein in Germany

Coordinates: 54°15′N 10°30′E

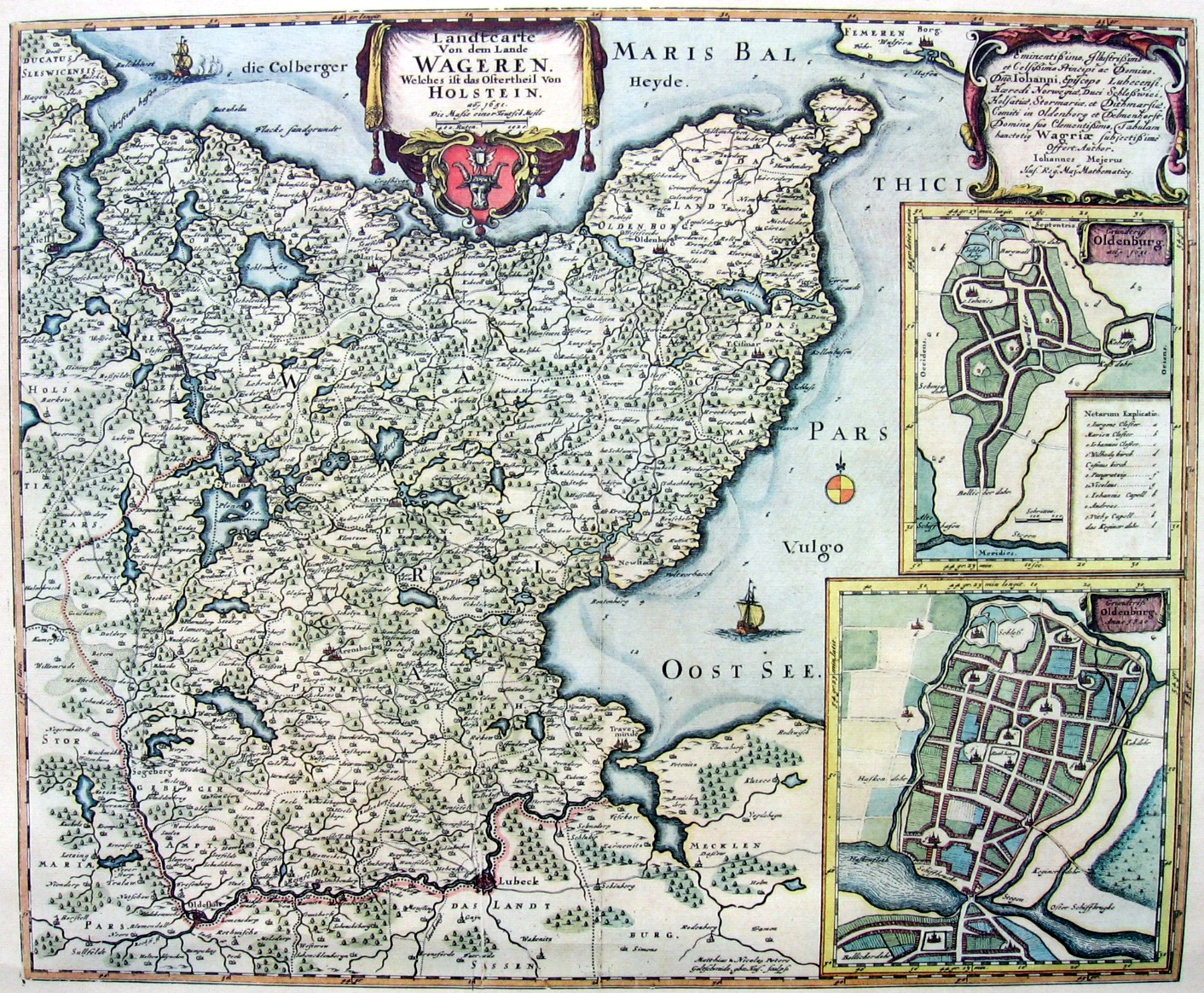
Historical map of Wagria (ca. 1682-88)

Wagria (German: Wagrien, Waierland or Wagerland) is the northeastern part of Holstein in the German state of Schleswig-Holstein, corresponding roughly to the districts of Plön and Ostholstein. The word "Wagria" is derived from the Slavic Lechites tribe of Wagri.

== Geography ==
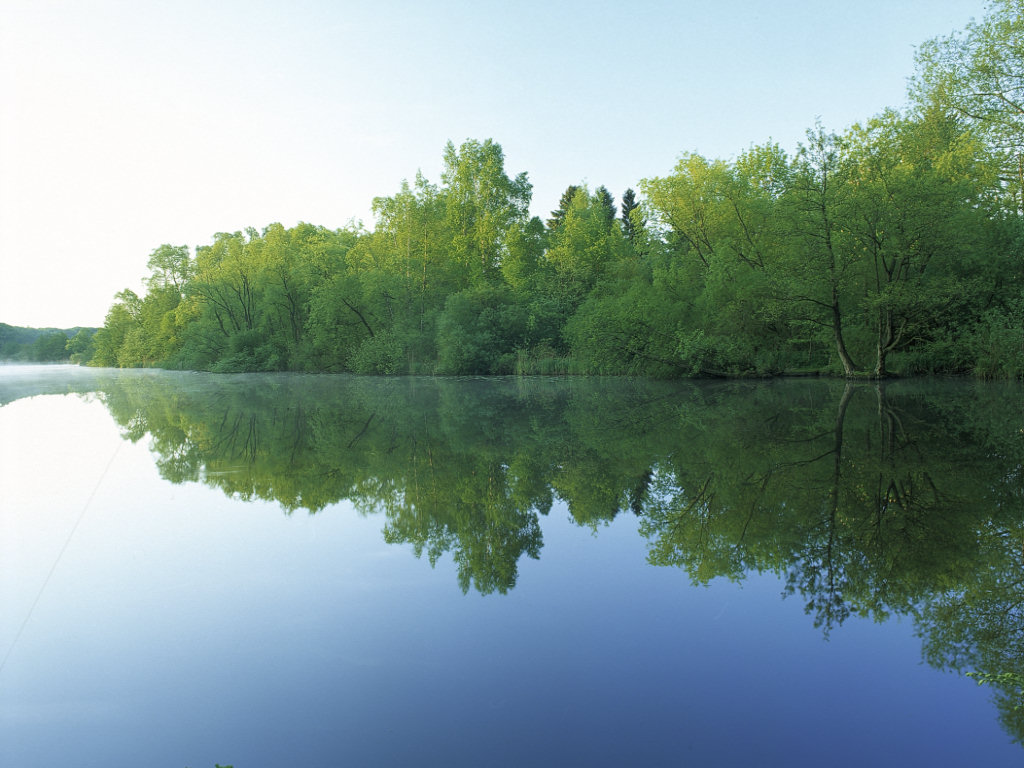
Schwentine, Wagria's border river.

In the Middle Ages, and as still shown on early modern maps, Wagria was bordered on the north and east by the Baltic Sea from the Kiel Fjord to Lübeck Bay, and inland by the rivers Schwentine and Trave. Today, Wagria generally refers just to the Oldenburg Peninsula (Oldenburgische Halbinsel) in Ostholstein.

The highest elevation in the peninsula is the Bungsberg at 168 metres.

== History ==
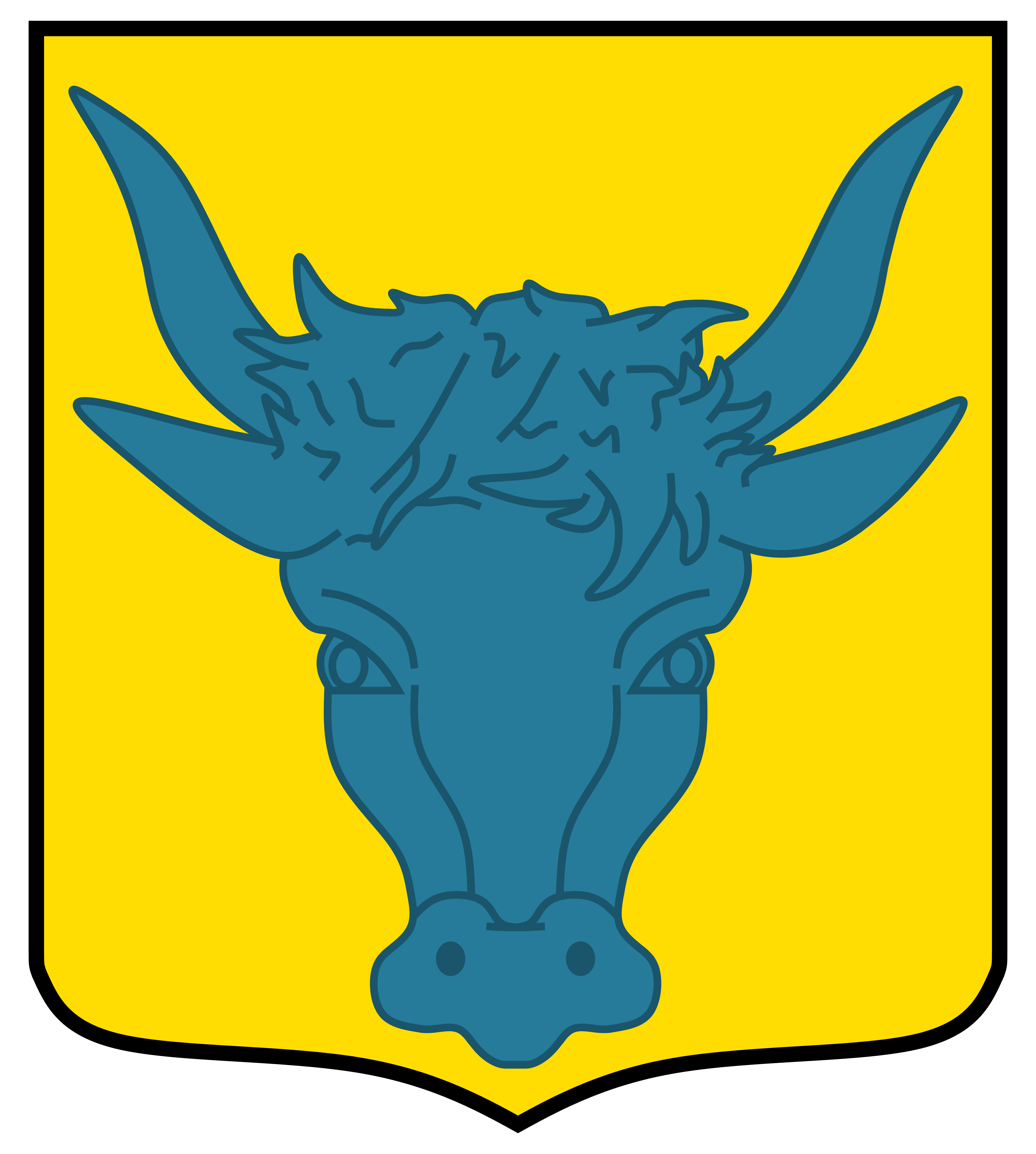
Recreation of a coat of arms attributed to Wagria

The Lechitic (Slavic) root of the name, Wagria, meant not only the so-called, present-day Wagrian peninsula, but the entire region between the Kiel Fjord, the middle reaches of the Trave, and the lower course of the river; a region with this name emerged at least as early as the 8th century. Wagria Castle occupied a central location in Oldenburg in Holstein (then called Starigard, or "Old Castle"); its ramparts still exist. Important settlements in Wagria were Oldenburg, Old-Lübeck (Liubice), and Plön (Plune).

In 1143, according to the vivid account by contemporary chronicler, Helmold of Bosau, Count Adolf II of Schauenburg and Holstein introduced German settlers, not only from his own territories of Holstein and Stormarn, but also from Westphalia and Holland, in order to develop the land of Wagria into a highly-profitable region as part of the German eastward expansion in the High Middle Ages:

"Then a countless number of people from different tribes left, took their families and possessions with them and went with Count Adolf in Wagria to take possession of their promised land. Initially, those from Holsten were given the most sheltered area west of Segeberg, on the River Trave, on the Schwentine flood plain and everything from the Schwale to the Grimmelsberg and Lake Ploen. The country around Dargun was settled by the Westphalians, the Eutin area by the Dutch and Suesel by the Frisians. The Plön area remained uninhabited however. He allowed Oldenburg, Lütjenburg and other coastal areas be colonised by the Slavs, who had to pay taxes to him."

The local Slavs were thus also involved in this expansion or development.

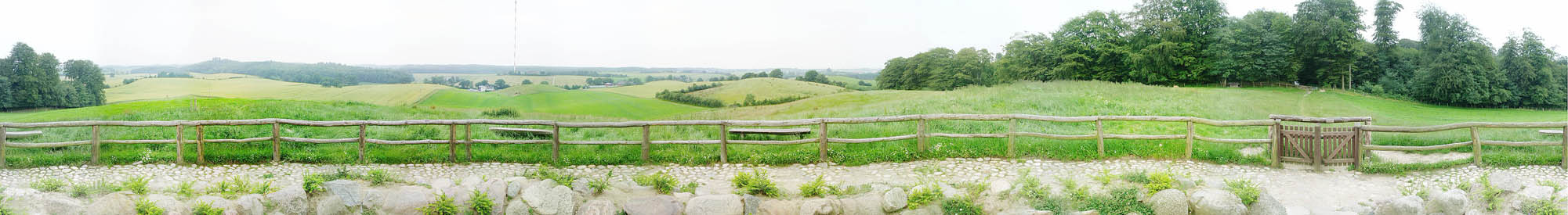
View from the highest point in the peninsula, the Bungsberg, over the eastern Holstein landscape of Wagria.

== Literature ==
- Witt, Hermann (1982). 1000 Jahre Wagrien von Luitschaburg bis Lütjenburg. Sönksen Verlag, Plön.
- Ohnesorge, Wilhelm (1926 and 1927) Kultur der alten Wagrier, Lübecker Bucht.
