= Polabians (tribe) =

West Slavic tribe, that lived between the Trave and the Elbe rivers

The Polabians (German: Polaben; Latin: Polabi) were a constituent Lechitic tribe of the Obotrites who lived between the Trave and the Elbe. The main settlement of the Polabians was Racisburg (modern Ratzeburg), named after their Prince Ratibor. The Polabians were similar to the Drevani, also known as the Draväno-polaben or Drevanen, in Lüchow-Dannenberg.

In 1139, Henry the Lion granted "Polabia" to Count Henry of Badewide. The tribe was subsequently Germanized and assimilated over the following centuries. The last remnants of the Polabians, including the Polabian language, died out in the 18th century. Cultural remnants of the Polabians of Lower Saxony include numerous villages in the region based on Slavic settlement forms.

== See also ==
- List of early Slavic peoples
- Lechites
- Polabian Slavs
