= Holstein =

Historical region of Germany

Coordinates: 54.1667°N 9.66667°E

Coat of arms of Holstein: a stylised nettle leaf; similar to the coat of arms of Schaumburg

Holstein (/ˈhoʊlstaɪn/; German: [ˈhɔlʃtaɪn]; Northern Low Saxon: Holsteen; Danish: Holsten; Latin: Holsatia) is the region between the rivers Elbe and Eider. It is the southern half of Schleswig-Holstein, the northernmost state of Germany.

Holstein once existed as the German County of Holstein (German: Grafschaft Holstein; 811–1474), the later Duchy of Holstein (German: Herzogtum Holstein; 1474–1866), and was the northernmost territory of the Holy Roman Empire. The history of Holstein is closely intertwined with the history of the Danish Duchy of Schleswig (Danish: Slesvig). The capital of Holstein is Kiel.

Holstein's name comes from the Holcetae, a Saxon tribe mentioned by Adam of Bremen as living on the north bank of the Elbe, to the west of Hamburg. The name means "dwellers in the wood" or "hill-sitters" (Northern Low Saxon: Hol(t)saten; German: Holzsassen).

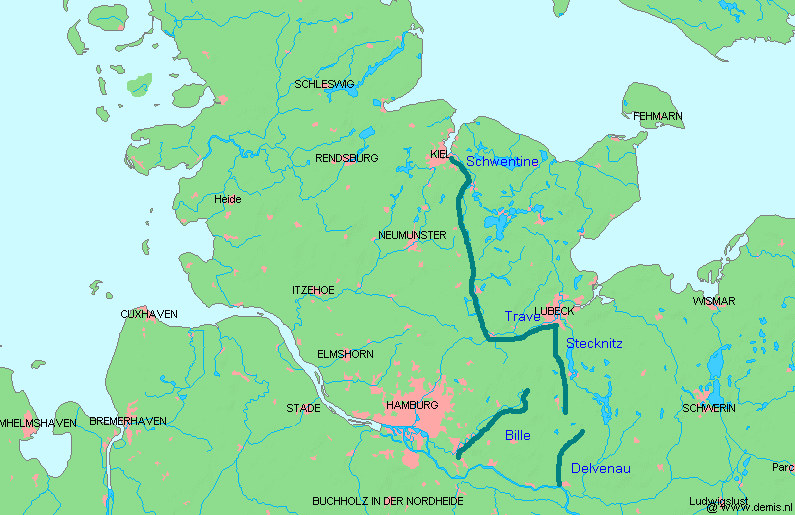
The Limes Saxoniae

== History ==
=== Origins ===
After the Migration Period of the Early Middle Ages, Holstein was adjacent to the Obotrites on the coast of the Baltic Sea and the land of the Danes in Jutland.

With the conquest of Old Saxony by Charlemagne circa 800, he granted the land north of the Eider River (Schleswig) to the Danes by the Treaty of Heiligen signed in 811. The ownership of what would later become eastern Holstein (districts of Plön and Ostholstein) was given to the Obotrites, namely the Wagrians, and the Saxon elite was deported to various areas of the empire. After 814, however, the Saxons were restored to Western Holstein. The Wagrians were pushed out of the Limes Saxoniae - the new border running from the Elbe River near Boizenburg northwards along the Bille River to the mouth of the Schwentine at the Kiel Fjord and the Baltic Sea. For the following 300 years, Holstein continued to be a part of Saxony.

=== County of Holstein ===
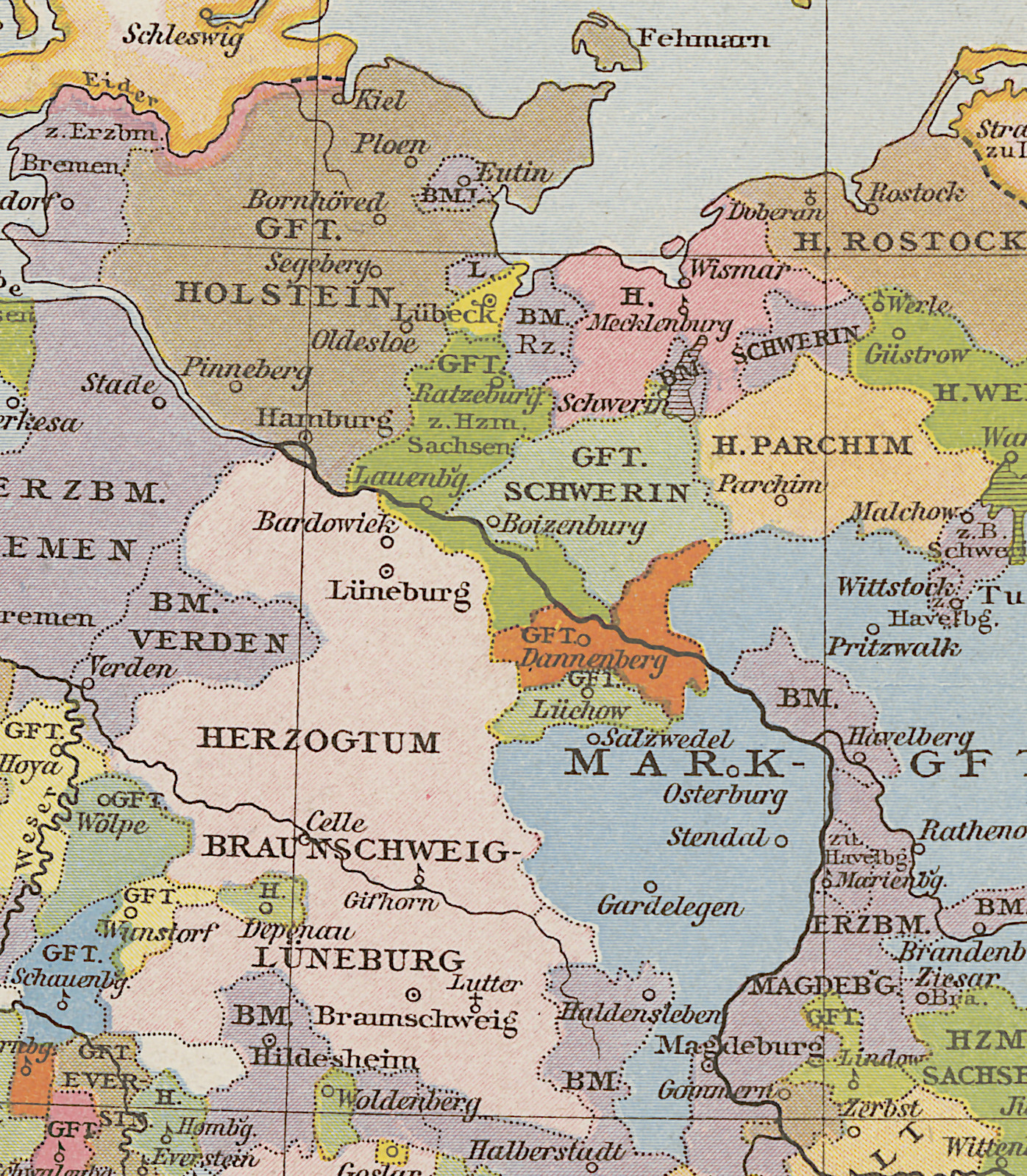
Undivided Holstein by 1250 (Note: Neighbours clockwise starting in the West: Prince-Archbishopric of Bremen (purple), Danish Schleswig (orange shadowed), Prince-Bishopric of Lübeck (purple), Free Imperial City of Lübeck (yellow), Duchy of Saxe-Lauenburg (green), Duchy of Brunswick and Lunenburg (pink).)

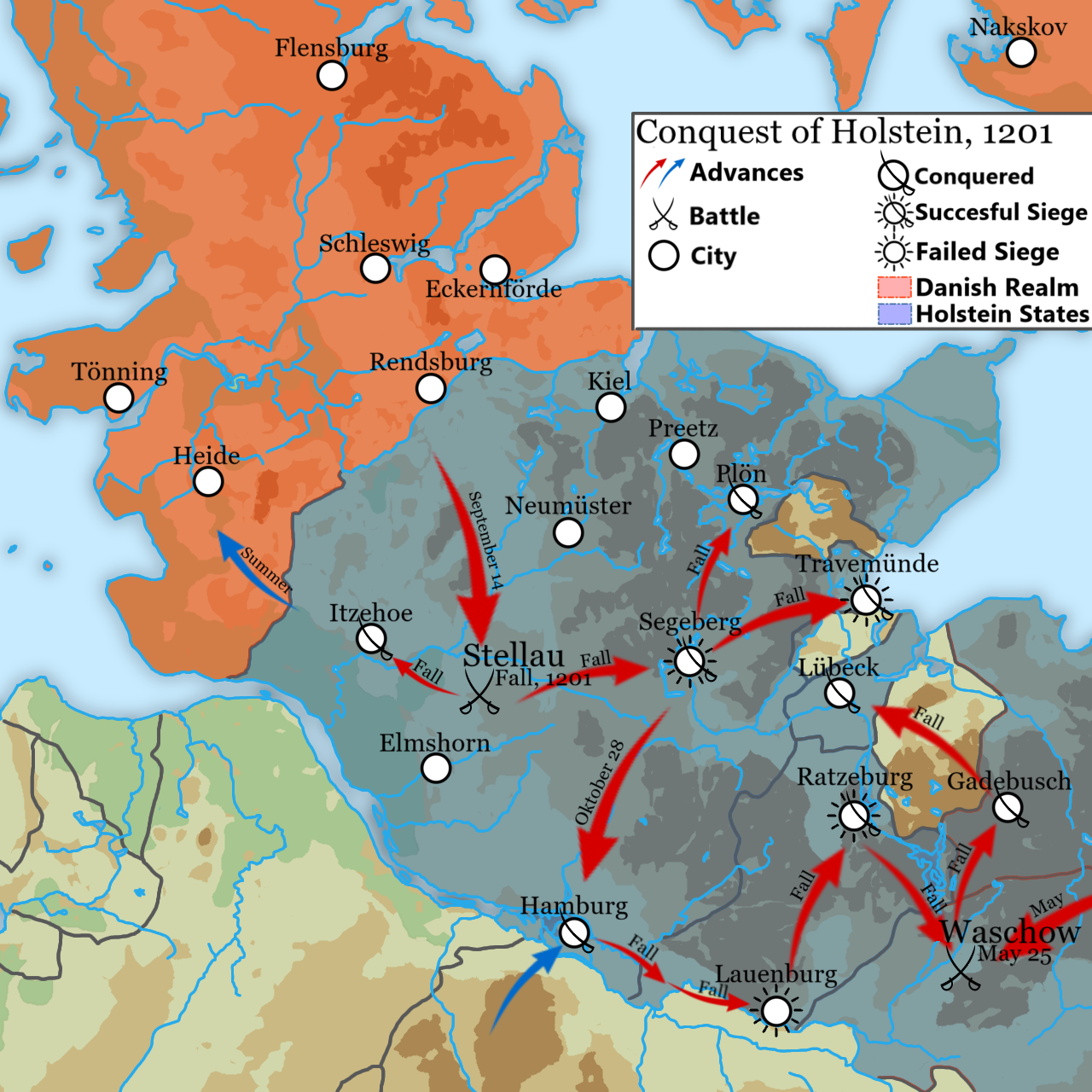
Battle of Stellau and other Danish Campaigns of 1201

The new county of Holstein was established in 1111; it was first a fief of the Duchy of Saxony. After that, it belonged to the Duchy of Saxe-Lauenburg, and finally it came into a possession of the Prince-Bishopric of Lübeck.

With the establishment of the new territorial unit, expansion to the East began and the Wagrians were finally defeated in 1138.

The County of Holstein was ruled by the House of Schaumburg; the first count was Adolf I, Count of Holstein.

Holstein was temporarily occupied by Denmark after the Battle of Stellau (1201), but was reconquered by the Count of Schauenburg and his allies in the Battle of Bornhöved (1227).

=== Partitions of the County of Holstein (1111–1474) ===
The Counts of Schauenburg and Holstein partitioned Holstein several times among the inheriting sons into up to six lines, named after their towns of residence:

- Holstein-Itzehoe, branch county between 1261 and 1290, partitioned from Holstein, repartitioned into Holstein-Pinneberg, Holstein-Plön and Holstein-Rendsburg
- Holstein-Kiel, branch county between 1261 and 1390, partitioned from Holstein, in 1273 Holstein-Segeberg (first) was partitioned from Holstein-Kiel, but reverted in 1308, but then lost to Holstein-Pinneberg, Holstein-Plön and Holstein-Rendsburg in 1316; Holstein-Kiel acquired Holstein-Plön in 1350, and merged itself into Holstein-Rendsburg
- Holstein-Pinneberg, branch county between 1290 and 1640, partitioned from Holstein-Itzehoe, acquired a share of Holstein-Segeberg in 1316, merged into the Duchy of Holstein
- Holstein-Plön, branch county between 1290 and 1390, partitioned from Holstein-Itzehoe, acquired a share of Holstein-Segeberg in 1316, merged into Holstein-Kiel
- Holstein-Rendsburg, branch county between 1290 and 1474, partitioned from Holstein-Itzehoe, acquired a share of Holstein-Segeberg (first) in 1316, and Holstein-Kiel in 1390, in 1381/1384 Holstein-Segeberg (second) was partitioned from Holstein-Rendsburg, but reverted in 1403, elevated to ducal rank in 1474
- Holstein-Segeberg (first), branch county between 1273 and 1308, partitioned from and reverted to Holstein-Kiel, but seized by allied Holstein-Pinneberg, Holstein-Plön, and Holstein-Rendsburg, partitioning Segeberg in three shares, each merged into one of the lines in 1316
- Holstein-Segeberg (second), branch county between 1381/1384 and 1403, partitioned from and reverted to Holstein-Rendsburg

In 1386 King Oluf II of Denmark and his mother, Queen Margaret I, enfeoffed in Nyborg Gerhard VI, Count of Holstein-Rendsburg and his cognatic successors with the Duchy of Schleswig. He thus became Gerhard II duke of Schleswig. Until 1390 the Rendsburg branch united by inheritance all branches except that of Holstein-Pinneberg.

When the Holstein-Rendsburg line of the Schauenburg counts became extinct with the death of Adolf VIII of Holstein-Rendsburg (and in personal union as Adolf I Duke of Schleswig) in 1459, Christian I of Denmark inherited – from his maternal uncle Adolf I – the Duchy of Schleswig, a Danish fief. Through the Treaty of Ribe (1460) Christian was elected Count of Holstein-Rendsburg, then still a Saxe-Lauenburgian subfief within the Holy Roman Empire.

=== Duchy of Holstein ===
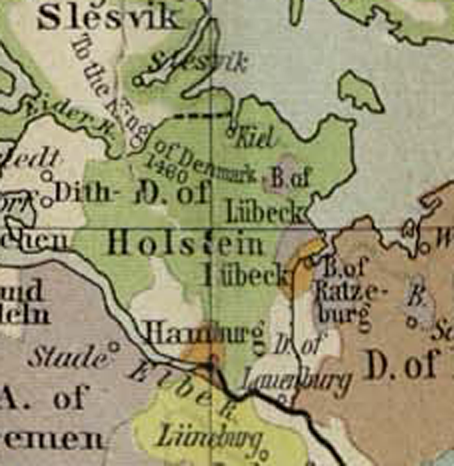
The Duchy of Holstein in 1477

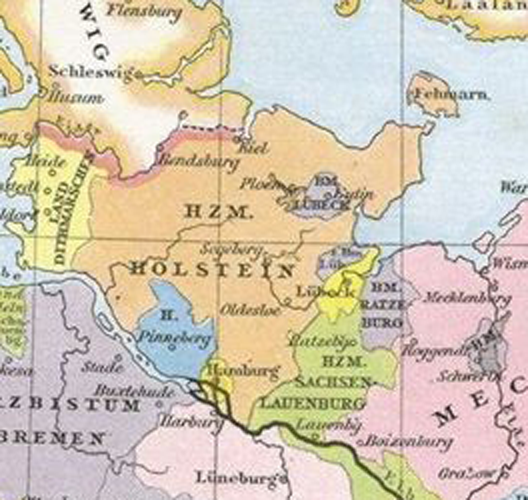
The Duchy of Holstein in the 15th century

In 1474 Lauenburg's liege lord, the Holy Roman Emperor/Emperor of Germany Frederick III, elevated Christian I as Count of Holstein-Rendsburg to Duke of Holstein, thus becoming an immediate imperial (reichsunmittelbar) vassal (see imperial immediacy). The Duchy of Holstein retained that status until the dissolution of the Empire in 1806.

=== Partitions of the Duchy of Holstein (1474–1866) ===
In 1490, the Duchy of Holstein was divided into Holstein-Segeberg and Holstein-Gottorp. Holstein-Segeberg remained with the Danish king and was also known as Royal Holstein; later it came to be known as Holstein-Glückstadt. Holstein-Gottorp, also known as Ducal Holstein, was given to a cadet branch of the House of Oldenburg, to which the kings of Denmark belonged.

Between 1533 and 1544 King Christian III of Denmark ruled the entire Duchies of Holstein and of Schleswig also in the name of his then still minor half-brothers John the Elder and Adolf. In 1544 they partitioned the Duchies of Holstein (a fief of the Holy Roman Empire) and of Schleswig (a Danish fief) in an unusual way, following negotiations between the brothers and the Estates of the Realm of the duchies, which had constituted in 1460 by the Treaty of Ribe and strictly opposed a factual partition. The elder three brothers determined their youngest brother Frederick for a career as Lutheran administrator of an ecclesiastical state within the Holy Roman Empire.

So the revenues of the duchies were divided in three equal shares by assigning the revenues of particular areas and landed estates to each of the elder brothers, while other general revenues, such as taxes from towns and customs dues, were levied together but then shared among the brothers. The estates, whose revenues were assigned to the parties, made Holstein and Schleswig look like patchworks, technically inhibiting the emergence of separate new duchies, as intended by the estates of the duchies. The secular rule in the fiscally divided duchies thus became a condominium of the parties. As dukes of Holstein and Schleswig the rulers of both houses bore the formal title of "Duke of Schleswig, Holstein, Ditmarsh and Stormarn". The three shares are usually called:

- Gottorp ducal share in Holstein and Schleswig, partitioned from ducal Holstein in 1544, acquired half of Haderslev share in 1581 (thus thereafter simply called ducal share), merged into the royal share in 1773 with its ruler receiving in return the prior Danish-held County of Oldenburg.
- Haderslev ducal share in Holstein and Schleswig, partitioned from ducal Holstein in 1544, halved between Gottorp and royal share in 1581
- Royal share in Holstein and Schleswig, acquired half of Haderslev share in 1581, the County of Holstein-Pinneberg in 1640 and the Gottorp share in 1713 (northern part) and 1773 (southern part), thus then comprising all of Holstein. Between 1648 and 1773 the royal share used to be called Holstein-Glückstadt after its capital Glückstadt. Parts of the former County of Holstein-Pinneberg were transformed 1649/50 into the Imperial County of Rantzau, which fell back to the Danish Crown in 1726.

The dynastic name Holstein-Gottorp comes as convenient usage from the technically more correct Duke of Schleswig and Holstein at Gottorp. Adolf, the third son of Duke and King Frederick I and the second youngest half-brother of King Christian III, founded the dynastic branch called House of Holstein-Gottorp, which is a cadet branch of the then royal Danish House of Oldenburg. The Danish monarchs and the Dukes of Holstein-Gottorp ruled both duchies together as to general government, however, collected their revenues in their separate estates. John the Elder conveniently called Duke of Schleswig-Holstein-Haderslev produced no issue, so no branch emerged from his side.

Similar to the above-mentioned agreement Christian III's youngest son John the Younger gained for him and his heirs a share in Holstein's and Schleswig's revenues in 1564, comprising a third of the royal share, thus a ninth of Holstein and Schleswig as to the fiscal point of view. John the Younger and his heirs, however, had no share in the condominial rule, so they were not ruling but mere titular dukes.

The share of John the Elder, who died in 1581, was halved between Adolf and Frederick II, thus increasing again the royal share by a fiscal sixth of Holstein and Schleswig. As an effect the complicated fiscal division of both separate duchies, Holstein and Schleswig, with shares of each party scattered in both duchies, provided them with a condominial government binding both together, partially superseding their legally different affiliation as Holy Roman and Danish fiefs.

The County of Holstein-Pinneberg, which had remained a separately ruled territory in Holstein until its line was extinct in 1640, was merged into the then royal share of the Duchy of Holstein. The Duke of Holstein-Gottorp became emperor of Russia in 1762 as Peter III and was planning an attack on Denmark to recover the Holstein-Gottorp lands possessions in Schleswig, which were seized by the Danish king in 1713. Although Peter was soon overthrown by his wife, Catherine the Great, the Danes determined to rid themselves of this problem. In 1773, they exchanged the County of Oldenburg for the Gottorp lands in Holstein, bringing all of Holstein under their control. Thus, Holstein was again united in one state.

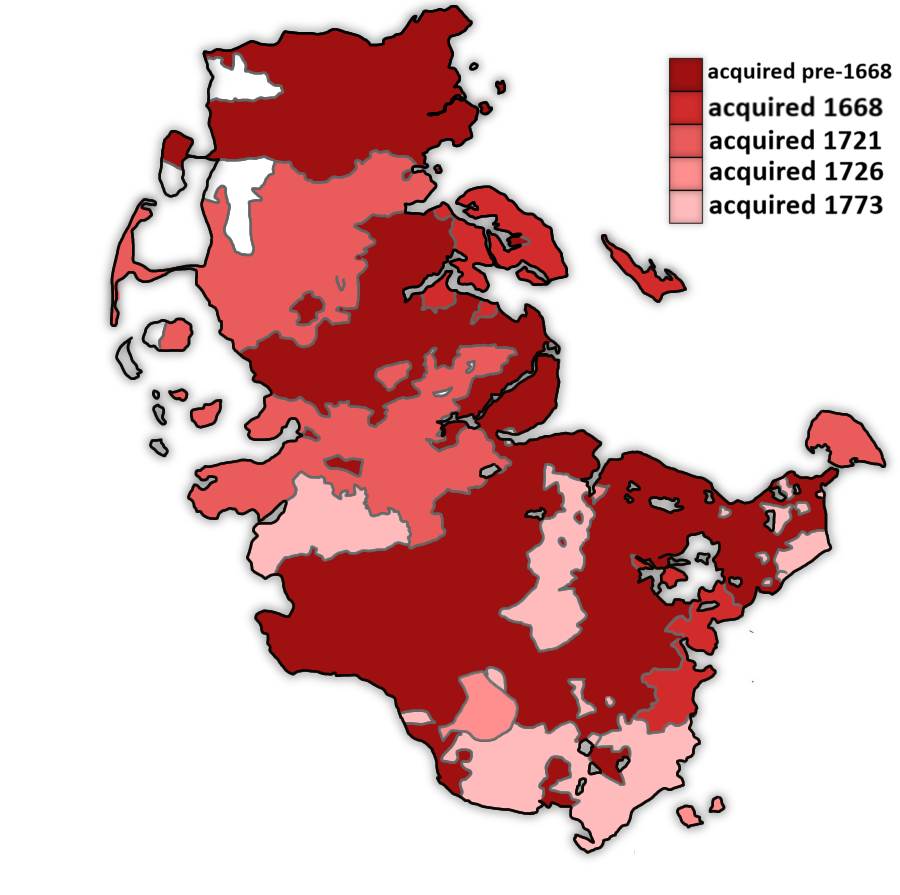
Unification process of Holstein

The territory of Holstein was enlarged by the conquest of the independent Republic of Dithmarschen in 1559, which was divided among the three ducal houses. After 1581 the southern part remained to the Danish Crown, the northern part was ruled by the House of Gottorp until 1773.

=== United Holstein ===
With the dissolution of the Holy Roman Empire in 1806 Holstein's imperial vassal status turned void. It thus became a sovereign state. Because of its personal union with Denmark, the Duchy of Holstein did not come under French occupation during the Napoleonic era (however, the neighboring duchy of Lauenburg was annexed by France in 1811 and became a part of Bouches-de-l'Elbe). From 1815 to 1864 it was a member of the German Confederation, though still in personal union with Denmark (the King of Denmark being also Duke of Holstein).

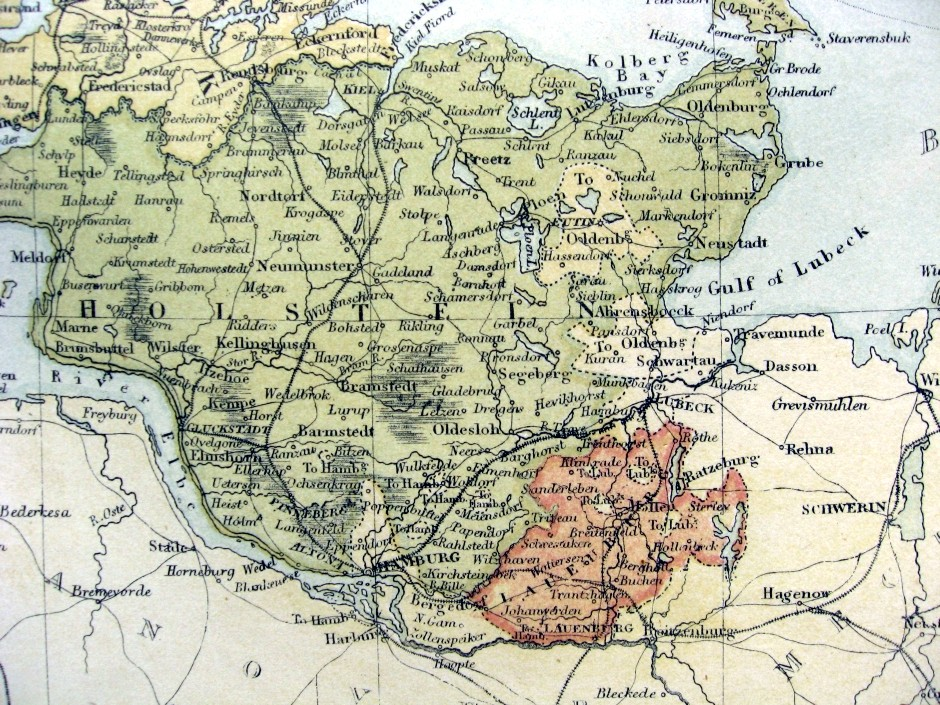
Map of the Duchy of Holstein, 1815-66

Following the death of King Frederick VII of Denmark (House of Oldenburg) in 1863, the inheritance of Schleswig and Holstein was disputed. The new king, Christian IX (House of Schleswig-Holstein-Sonderburg-Glücksburg, a cadet branch of the House of Oldenburg), made his claim to the Danish throne through a female line. The Duke of Augustenborg, a minor scion from another cadet line of the House of Oldenburg, claimed the Duchies, and soon the German Confederation, led by Prussia and Austria, went to the Second Schleswig War with Denmark, quickly defeating it in 1864 and forcing it to cede the duchies.

However, the duchies were not given to the Duke of Augustenborg. In 1865 an arrangement was worked out between Prussia and Austria where the Austrians occupied and administered Holstein, while the Prussians did the same in Schleswig. This arrangement came to an end with the Austro-Prussian War of 1866, which resulted in Schleswig and Holstein both being incorporated into Prussia as the Province of Schleswig-Holstein. Holstein, meanwhile including former Saxe-Lauenburg (as of 1876) and the former Free and Hanseatic City of Lübeck and Region of Lübeck (both as of 1937) regained statehood, now united with Schleswig, in 1946, when the British occupation government elevated the province to the State of Schleswig-Holstein, followed by the official dissolution of Prussia in 1947.

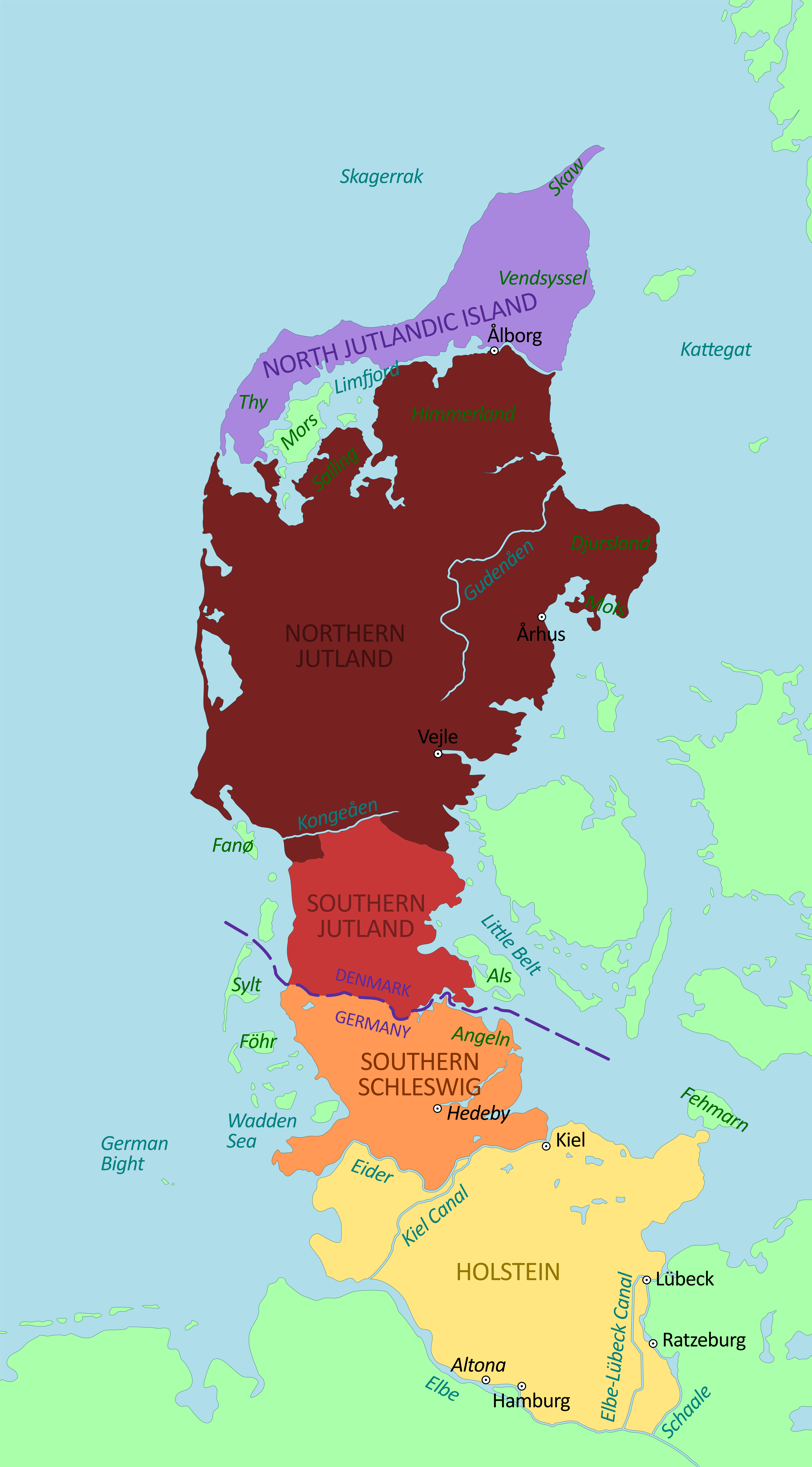
Map of Jutland and Northernmost Germany showing Schleswig and Holstein in today's Schleswig-Holstein

For a list of rulers, see Counts of Schauenburg and Holstein and List of rulers of Schleswig-Holstein.

== Geography ==
As of 1864, Holstein bordered Denmark in the north, the Principality of Lübeck (formerly the Prince-Bishopric of Lübeck, an exclave of the Grand Duchy of Oldenburg), the Free and Hanseatic City of Lübeck, and the Duchy of Saxe-Lauenburg in the east, and the Kingdom of Hanover and the Free and Hanseatic City of Hamburg in the south. It also borders the North Sea in the west and the Baltic Sea in the east. Its only major island is Fehmarn, originally a part of the Duchy of Schleswig until 1867.

Cities in Holstein included Kiel, Altona, Glückstadt, Rendsburg, Segeberg, Heiligenhafen, Oldenburg in Holstein, and Plön. It had an area of 8,385 km^{2}.
