= Siege of Dobin =

Saxon-Danish siege of Obotrite fortress in 1147

- Part of the Wendish Crusade
Date	July 1147
Location	Dobin, Lake Schwerin (present-day Mecklenburg, northern Germany)
Result	Obotrite victory

Belligerents
Duchy of Saxony; Archbishopric of Bremen; Archbishopric of Magdeburg; Kingdom of Denmark	Slavic Obotrites

Commanders and leaders
Henry III; Adalbert II; Canute V Sweyn III	Niklot

Strength
15,000–25,000	3,000–6,000

Casualties and losses
Heavy	Unknown

The Siege of Dobin took on place during the Wendish Crusade against the West Slavic pagan Wends. The Obotrite fortress on Lake Schwerin was besieged by a combined Saxon force of Henry III, supported by the Danish navy of Canute V and Sweyn III, with the siege resulting in Saxon-Danish failure.

== Prelude ==
The Wendish Crusade was launched on summer 1147, with the combined Crusader armies of Saxony Bremen and Magdeburg led by Henry III. Adalbert II of Bremen would be among the commanders. The Danish fleet of Canute V and Sweyn III also jointed the crusade, temporarily halting their rivalry over the right to Danish throne. This combined Crusader army would go on to besiege Obotrite fortress of Dobin, while another part of the Crusader forces of the Holy Roman Empire would end up unsuccessfully besieging Demmin. The primarily goal of the Crusade appeared to be plunder and subjugation of the Wendish Slavic pagan lands, alongside forced conversion of the Slavic pagans to Catholicism. The Crusader army likely consisted of 15,000–25,000 troops, while the Dobin garrison would've had a force of 3,000–6,000.

== Siege ==
Obotrite leader Niklot fortified himself to the north Elber river, at the small fortress of Dobin after carrying out his raids. The Danes intended to sail from Denmark to the north of the fortress and then proceed with their assault on land. The combined army of Henry III was going to attack from the direction of Saxony. The Saxon-Danish forces were planning to surround and take the Dobin garrison by surprise.

As the Saxon army of Henry begun their assaults, but their attacks were constantly repelled and the Saxon forces were tied up besieging the Dobin fortress. The Danish navy was meant to strike from the north, but they were unexpectedly attacked by the Slavic Rani fleet, with Danish troops that managed to land getting ambushed by the Wendish forces. These surprise attacks prevented the Danes from providing support for the Saxons, which were tied up at Dobin and relied on Danes to turn the tied of this siege. The Danish forces suffered heavy defeats at the Bay of Wismar and on land, forcing them to retreat. Some elements of the Saxon army wanted to ravage the countryside in order to force the Dobin garrison to capitulate, but this decision was overturned by their commanders, with one of them stating: "Is not the land we are devastating our land, and the people we are fighting our people?".

== Aftermath ==
The siege was unsuccessful from a military point of view. Niklot managed to force the Saxon-Danish Crusader army to retreat. Politically, the Crusaders managed to negotiate conversion of Dobrin garrison in exchange for leaving the Wendish lands. This had proven to be a temporary and incomplete political success, as the Wends would shortly return to their pagan practices. The Wendish Crusade would get criticised by Bernard of Clairvaux for failing to achieve mass conversion of the Slavic pagans. The Crusade ended up having uncertain results and wasn't able to achieve its immediate objectives.
