= Werner of Steusslingen =

Werner of Steusslingen (German: Werner von Steußlingen) may refer to:

- Werner of Magdeburg (died 1078), archbishop
- Werner of Münster (died 1151), bishop of Münster
