= Constitution of Mecklenburg-Vorpommern =

The Constitution of the State of Mecklenburg-Vorpommern finally came into force on 15 November 1994 with the convening of the second state parliament of Mecklenburg-Vorpommern.

It was drawn up by a constitutional commission between January 31, 1991, and April 30, 1993; the draft was submitted to the first state parliament and confirmed without changes on May 14, 1993, by a two-thirds majority. The constitution came into provisional effect on May 23, 1993. On June 12, 1994, the referendum required under Article 80 of the Constitution of Mecklenburg-Vorpommern to confirm the constitution was held. It was approved with 60.1% of the valid votes cast. The constitution has been amended four times, most recently in June 2011.

== Structure and organization ==
The constitution of the state of Mecklenburg-Vorpommern is divided into four sections: fundamental principles, state organisation, state functions and final provisions.

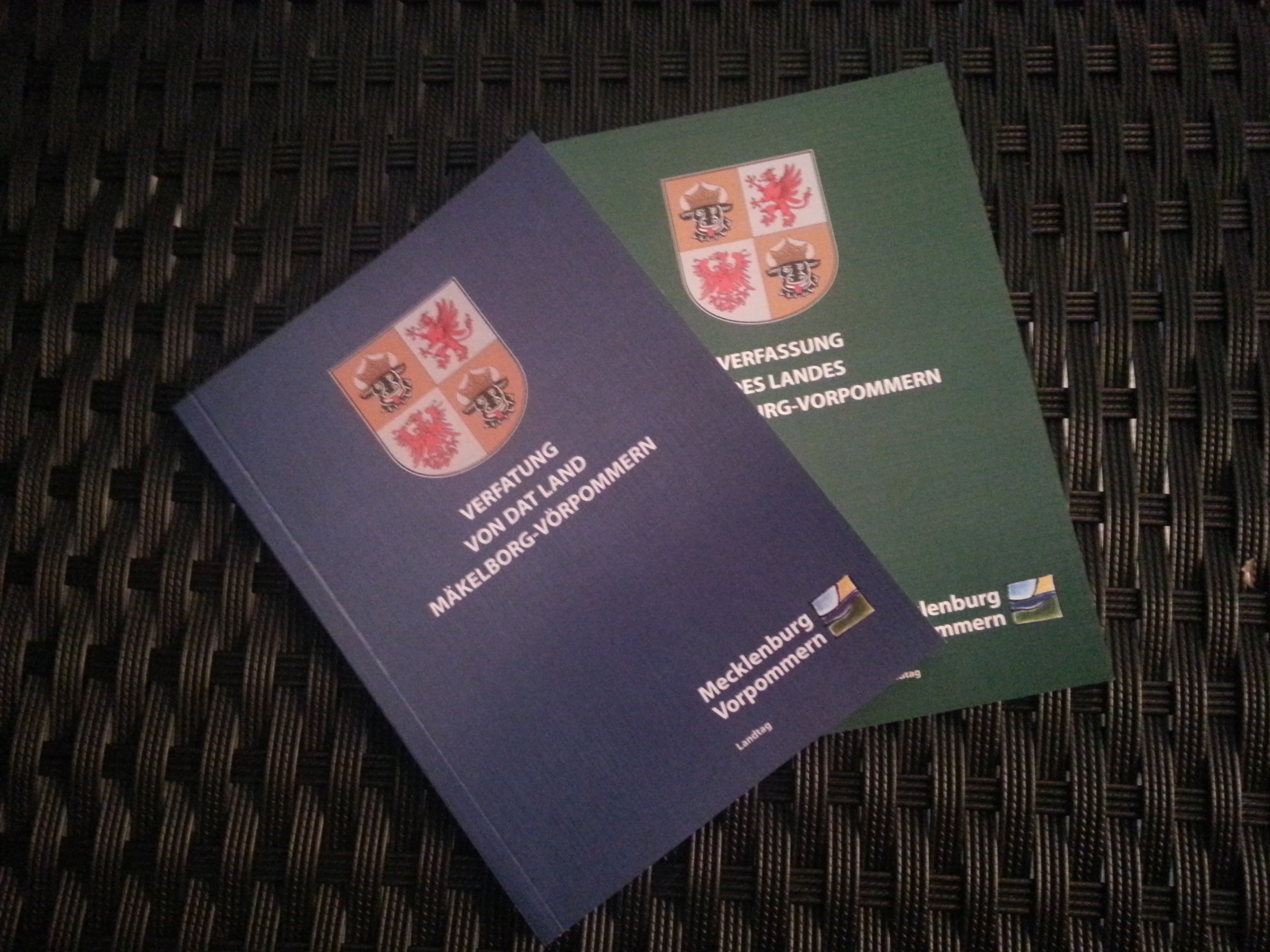
Constitution of the State of Mecklenburg-Vorpommern in the Low German and German editions

=== Basics ===
The section on the basic principles contains the form of government, the basic rights and the goals of the state. Mecklenburg-Vorpommernis therefore a republican, democratic, social and constitutional state committed to the protection of the natural foundations of life. Article 5, Paragraph 3 of the Constitution of the Federal Republic of Germany dynamically incorporates the fundamental rights and civil rights of the Basic Law for the Federal Republic of Germany by declaring them to be directly applicable law. In the following articles, certain fundamental rights that are already part of the Basic Law through the reference are highlighted again. This concerns data protection and information rights, freedom of art and science, equal opportunities in education, churches and religious societies and the right to petition. The state objectives include efforts to protect the environment and the protection of minorities.

=== State organization ===
The section on state organisation describes the state parliament, state government and state constitutional court. According to Article 20 of the Constitution of Mecklenburg-Vorpommern, the state parliament consists of at least 71 members who were elected in free, equal, direct, secret and general elections. It is elected for a term of five years. It elects a prime minister by secret ballot with the majority of its members. The Minister-President, together with the ministers appointed by him, forms the Land Government, which is at the head of the executive power. The Minister-President, together with the ministers appointed by him, forms the Land Government, which is at the head of the executive power. The State Constitutional Court decides on constitutional complaints, among other things.

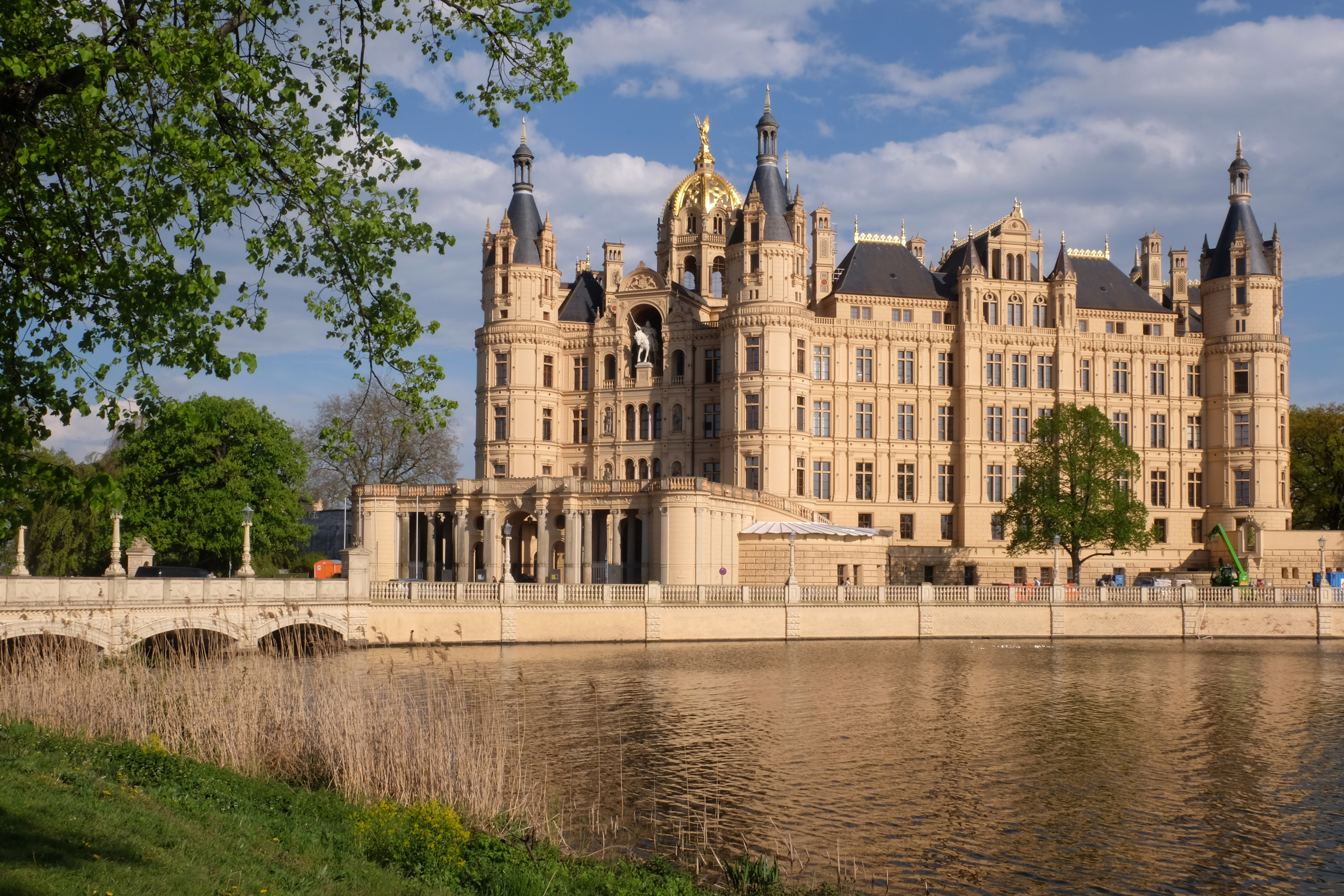
Schwerin Castle, constitutional seat of the state parliament

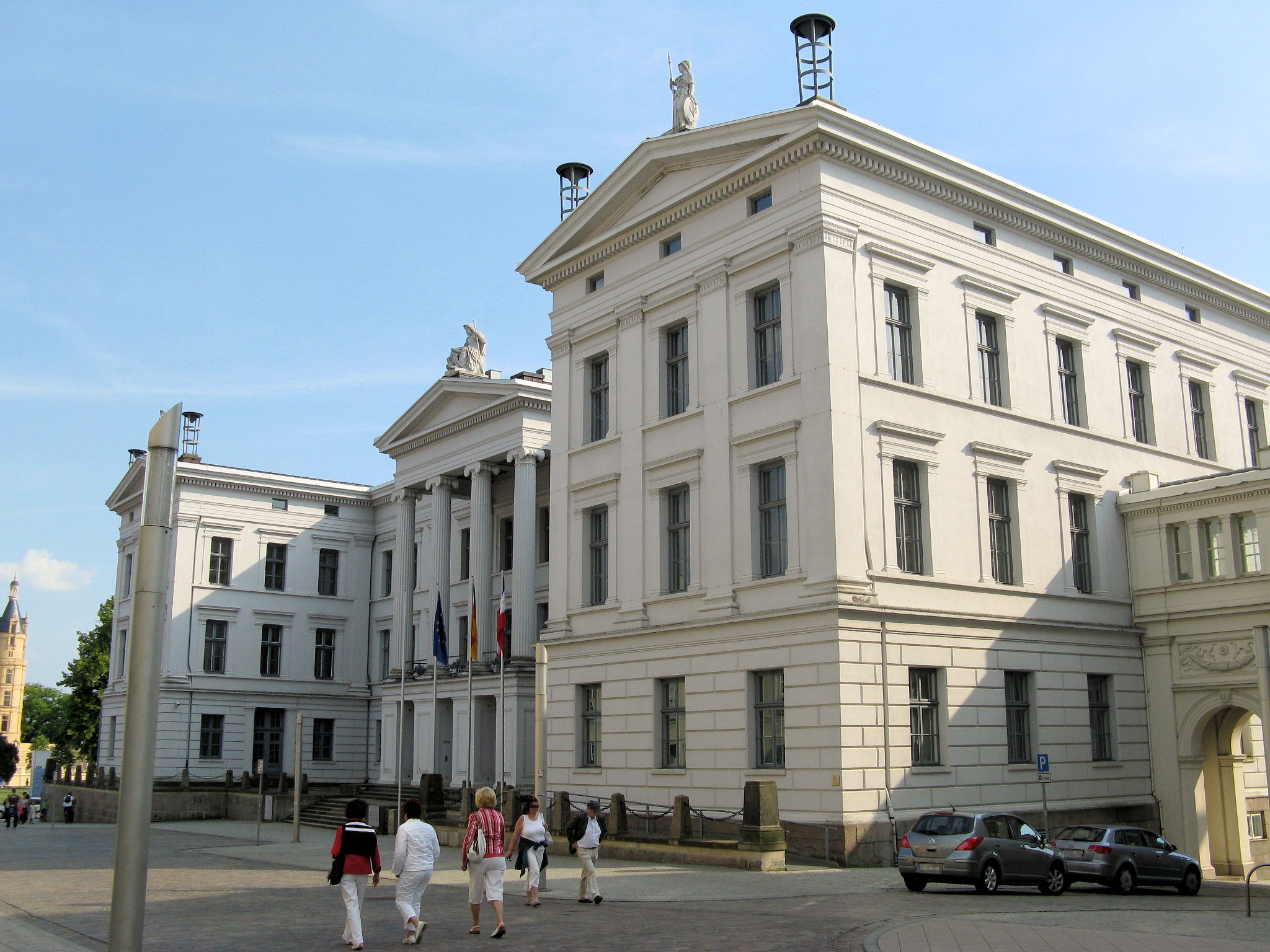
State Chancellery, official residence of the Minister-President

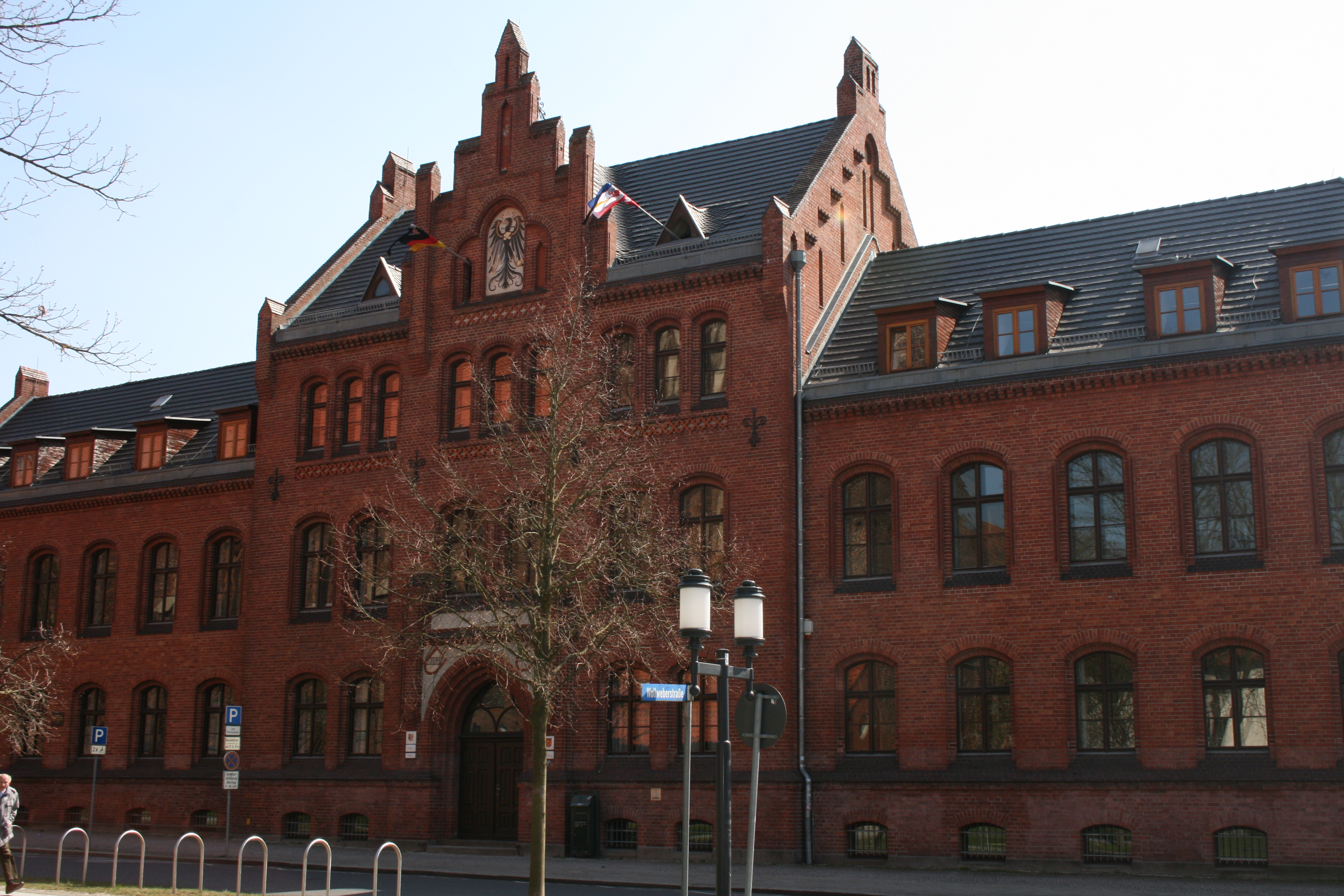
Courthouse in Greifswald, seat of the State Constitutional Court

=== State functions ===
The section on state functions begins with provisions on legislation and constitutional amendments. Legislative initiatives can be introduced by the state government, from within the state parliament and by the people. Articles 59 and 60 of the Constitution of the Federal Republic of Germany allow for popular initiatives, referendums and popular votes. However, budget, tax and salary laws are not permissible subjects for popular initiatives, referendums and popular votes. Articles 61 to 68 of the Constitution of the Federal Republic of Germany then contain provisions on the budget and audit, followed by provisions on state and self-government. This provides a more detailed definition of the self-government of municipalities, which is already guaranteed by Article 28, Paragraph 2 of the Basic Law. It also allows the establishment of regional associations with the right to self-government to maintain and promote, in particular, historical, cultural and scenic features of the regions of Mecklenburg and Western Pomerania. In den folgenden beiden Artikeln wird schließlich die Rechtsprechung geregelt: Sie wird im Namen des Volkes ausgeübt und ist unabhängig.

=== Final provisions ===
The section on the final provisions includes, among other things, provisions on the handing over of the constitutional text of the Constitution for the State of Mecklenburg-Vorpommern and the Basic Law for the Federal Republic of Germany to pupils when they leave school and the linguistic equality of official and functional titles.

== Constitutional amendments ==
Laws amending the constitution require a majority of two-thirds of the members of the state parliament. It is protected by Article 56, Paragraph 3 of the Constitution of Mecklenburg-Vorpommern against changes that contradict human dignity or the principles laid down in Article 2 of the Constitution of Mecklenburg-Vorpommern (a republican, democratic, social and constitutional state committed to protecting the natural foundations of life). It is also possible to change the constitution through a referendum. At least two thirds of those voting must agree, representing at least half of those eligible to vote.

So far, the Constitution has been amended four times:

- by law of 4 April 2000 (GVOBl. MV 2000, p. 158), amending Article 72 paragraph 3,
- by law of 14 July 2006 (GVOBl. MV 2006, p. 572), whereby the table of contents, Articles 12, 14, 17, 27, 52, 60, 62 were amended and Article 17a was newly inserted,
- by law of 3 December 2007 (GVOBl. MV 2007, p. 371), which amended the table of contents and inserted Art. 18a,
- by law of 30 June 2011 (GVOBl. M-V p. 375), which amended Article 65 and inserted a new Article 79a (debt brake).

== Literature ==
- Claus Dieter Classen/Michael Sauthoff (Hrsg.): Verfassung des Landes Mecklenburg-Vorpommern. 3. Aufl. Nomos, Baden-Baden 2023, ISBN 978-3-8487-8236-9.
