= Dobin am See =

- Municipality
- Location of Dobin am See within Ludwigslust-Parchim district
- Interactive map of Dobin am See
- Location within Germany Location within Mecklenburg-Vorpommern
- Coordinates: 53°44′N 11°32′E
- Country: Germany
- State: Mecklenburg-Vorpommern
- District: Ludwigslust-Parchim
- Municipal assoc.: Crivitz
- Subdivisions: 7

Government
  - Mayor: Carlo Folgmann

Area
  - Total: 34.78 km^{2} (13.43 sq mi)
- Elevation: 63 m (207 ft)

Population (2025-12-31)
  - Total: 2,015
  - Density: 57.94/km^{2} (150.1/sq mi)
- Time zone: UTC+01:00 (CET)
  - Summer (DST): UTC+02:00 (CEST)
- Postal codes: 19067
- Dialling codes: 03866
- Vehicle registration: PCH

Dobin am See is a municipality in the Ludwigslust-Parchim district, in Mecklenburg-Vorpommern, Germany.

== Villages ==
1. Alt Schlagsdorf
2. Buchholz
3. Flessenow
4. Liessow
5. Neu Schlagsdorf
6. Retgendorf
7. Rubow

== History ==
While the municipality of Dobin am See has only existed since 14 June 2004, being a merger of the former municipalities of Retgendorf and Rubow, the name Dobin stems from that of a castle which the Obotrite prince Niklot had constructed between the Schwerin Lake and the Döpe around 1160. The castle was a notable sight during the Wendish Crusade, with the Siege of Dobin taking place at this location.

Most villages located within the municipality were founded during the 13th century. From the 15th century to the 18th century, the villages of Alt Schlagsdorf, Buchholz, Flessenow, Neu Schlagsdorf, Retgendorf and Rubow belonged to the von Sperling family. Up until World War II, the area was part of the Grand Duchy of Mecklenburg-Schwerin. After 1945, it passed to the state of Mecklenburg and then to the East German Bezirk Schwerin, finally coming to the modern state of Mecklenburg-Vorpommern in 1990 with German reunification.

== Geography ==
Dobin am See lies on the northeastern shore of Schwerin Lake amid a hilly terminal moraine landscape.

== Notable residents ==
The poet August Heinrich Hoffmann von Fallersleben stayed in Buchholz from 1844 to 1849; many of his poems had their origin in the area.
