= Wendish Crusade =

Military campaign in 1147

- Part of the Northern Crusades
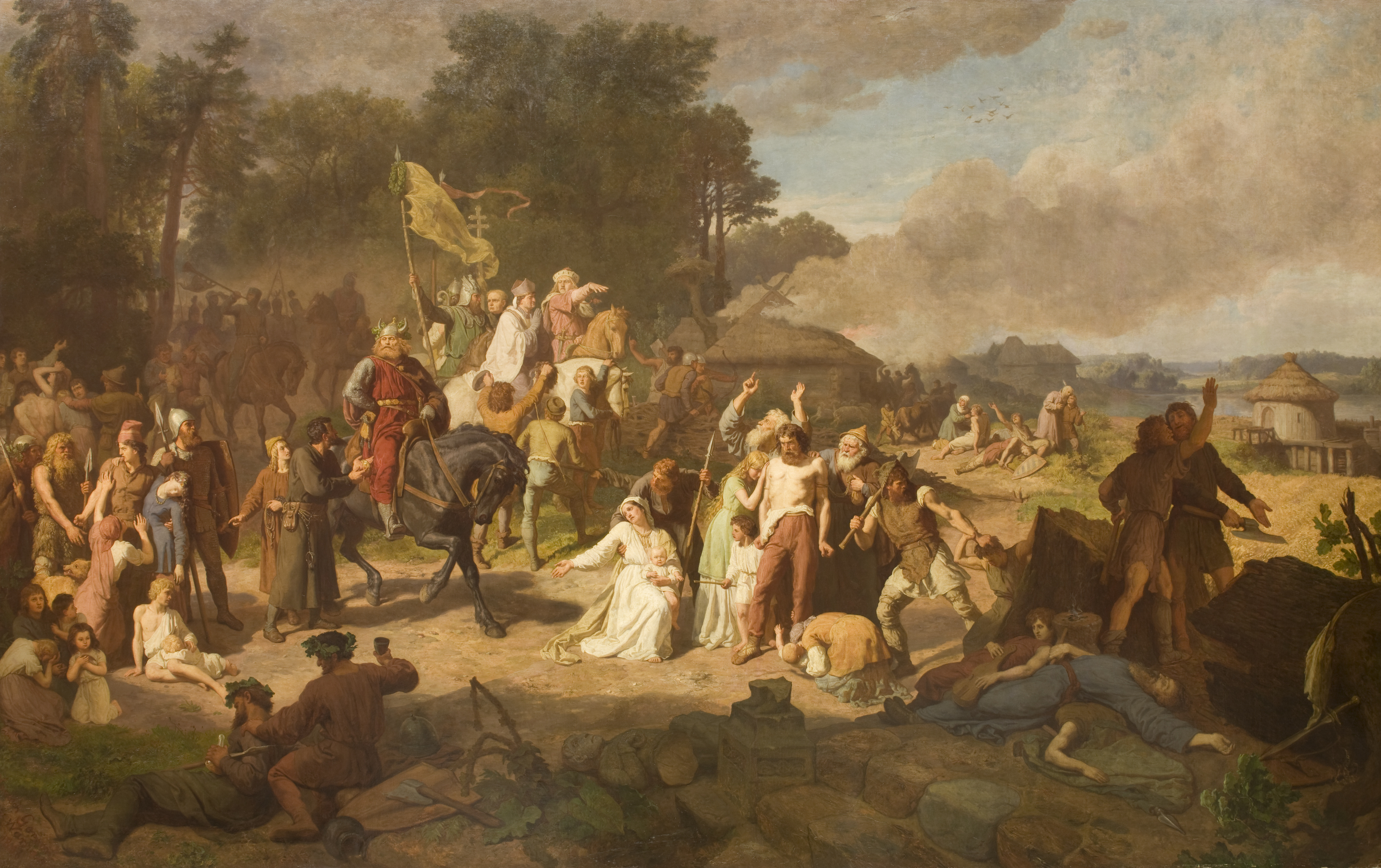
- The Capture of the Wends
Date	1147
Location	Northern Europe (present-day Mecklenburg, in Dobin am See, Demmin and Malchow)
Result	See § Aftermath

Belligerents
Crusaders: Holy Roman Empire; Bishopric of Havelberg; March of Meissen; March of Brandenburg; Duchy of Saxony; Archbishopric of Bremen; Archbishopric of Mainz; Bishopric of Halberstadt; County of Holstein; Bishopric of Münster; Bishopric of Olomouc; Prince-Bishopric of Brandenburg; Bishopric of Merseburg; Kingdom of Denmark; Kingdom of Poland	Wends: Obotrite Confederacy; Obotrites; Wagrians; Liutizian Confederacy; Supported by: Duchy of Pomerania

Commanders and leaders
Anselm of Havelberg; Conrad, Margrave of Meissen; Albert the Bear; Henry the Lion; Canute V of Denmark; Sweyn III of Denmark; Frederick Barbarossa; Adalbert II of Bremen; Henry I of Mainz; Rudolf I of Halberstadt; Werner of Münster; Reinhard of Merseburg; Wiggar of Brandenburg; Henry of Olmütz; Adolf II of Holstein; Unknown Polish Captain	Niklot; Pribislav of Wagria; Ratibor I of Pomerania

The Wendish Crusade (German: Wendenkreuzzug) was a religious military campaign in central and eastern Europe, initiated in 1147. As one of the Northern Crusades, it was led primarily by the Catholic Kingdom of Germany — a constituent of the Holy Roman Empire — and directed against the then-pagan Polabian Slavs (or "Wends"). The Wends were made up of the Slavic tribes of Abrotrites, Rani, Liutizians, Wagarians, and Pomeranians who lived east of the River Elbe in present-day northeast Germany and Poland.

The lands inhabited by the Wends were rich in resources, which played a factor in the motivations of those who participated in the crusade. The mild climate of the Baltic area allowed for the cultivation of land and livestock. Animals of this region were also thickly furred, supporting the dependence on fur trading. Access to the coastline also developed fishing and trade networks. The land was attractive for the resources it boasted, and the crusade offered an opportunity for noble families to gain part of it.

By the early 12th century, the German archbishoprics of Bremen and Magdeburg sought the conversion to Christianity of neighboring pagan West Slavs through peaceful means. During the preparation of the Second Crusade to the Holy Land, a papal bull was issued supporting a crusade against these Slavs. The Slavic leader Niklot preemptively invaded Wagria in June 1147, leading to the march of the crusaders later that summer. They negotiated an ostensible forced baptism of Slavs at Dobin after an unsuccessful siege, but were completely repulsed from Demmin. Another crusading army marched on the already Christian city of Szczecin (Stettin), whereupon the crusaders dispersed upon arrival (see below).

The Christian army, composed primarily of Saxons and Danes, forced tribute from the pagan Slavs and affirmed German control of Wagria and Polabia through colonization, but failed to convert the bulk of the population immediately.

== Background ==
The Ottonian dynasty supported eastward expansion of the Holy Roman Empire towards Wendish (West Slavic) lands during the 10th century. The campaigns of King Henry the Fowler and Emperor Otto the Great led to the introduction of burgwards to protect German conquests in the lands of the Sorbs. Otto's lieutenants, Margraves Gero and Hermann Billung, advanced eastward and northward respectively to claim tribute from conquered Slavs. Bishoprics were established at Meissen, Brandenburg, Havelberg, and Oldenburg to administer the territory. A majority of Wendish tribes had been Christianized from the German conquests, but in 983 they returned to paganism when a great Slavic rebellion reversed the initial German gains. While the burgwards allowed the Saxons to retain control of Meissen, they lost Brandenburg and Havelberg. The Elbe River then became the eastern limit of German-Roman control.

By the early 12th century, the Archbishoprics of Bremen, Magdeburg and Gniezno sought the conversion of the pagan Slavs to Christianity through peaceful means: notable missionaries included Vicelin, Norbert of Xanten, and Otto of Bamberg (sent to Pomerania by Bolesław III Wrymouth of Poland). Lacking support from the Salian dynasty of the Holy Roman Empire, secular Saxon princes seeking Slavic territory found themselves in a military stalemate with their adversaries. Christians, especially Saxons from Holstein, and pagans raided each other across the Limes Saxonicus, usually for tribute.

The idea of a crusade against the Wends first originated in the Magdeburg Letter, originally sent around 1107 to 1110, in which an anonymous author makes an appeal against the Wends. The Magdeburg Letter makes the case that the Wends are pagans and that any fight against them is justified and the land that they inhabit is "our Jerusalem". In the letter no formal spiritual indulgence is offered apart from a general salvation of the soul, but an emphasis is put on acquiring land. The author says, "these gentiles [pagans] are most wicked, but their land is the best, rich in meat, honey, corn, and birds; and if it were well cultivated none could be compared to it for the wealth of its produce. So say those who know it. And so, most renowned Saxon, Franks, Lorrainers, and Flemings and conquerors of the world, this is an occasion for you to save your souls and, if you wish it, acquire the best land in which to live." The references made to the wealth of resources in the Slavic lands would have been especially appealing to those who were motivated by material gain. The Magdeburg letter established the ideas of a northern crusade and land acquisition that would come to play defining roles of the Wendish Crusade.

From 1140–43 Holsatian nobles advanced into Wagria to settle in the lands of the pagan Wagri permanently. Count Adolf II of Holstein and Henry of Badewide took control of Polabian settlements which would later become Lübeck and Ratzeburg; Vicelin was subsequently installed as bishop at Oldenburg. Adolf sought peace with the chief of the Obodrite confederacy, Niklot, and encouraged German colonization and missionary activity in Wagria.

The fall of Edessa in Syria in 1144 shocked Christendom, causing Pope Eugenius III and St. Bernard of Clairvaux to preach a Second Crusade to reinforce Outremer. While many south Germans volunteered to crusade in the Middle East, the north German Saxons were reluctant. They told Bernard of their desire to campaign against the Slavs at a Reichstag meeting in Frankfurt on 13 March 1147. The Wends were seen as a threat to Christendom as they were apostates, meaning the crusade against them would be justified. Approving of the Saxons' plan, Pope Eugenius III issued a papal bull known as the Divina dispensatione on 11 April 1147. As part of the bull, Eugenius III fulfilled and validated a promise made by Bernard that the same indulgences would be offered to those who crusaded against the Wends as those who went to fight in the Middle East. These indulgences offered a complete forgiveness of sin, meaning there was to be no difference between the spiritual rewards of the different crusaders. Those who volunteered to crusade against the Slavic pagans were primarily Danes, Saxons, and Poles, although there were also some Bohemians. In preaching the Crusade, Bernard feared that those who participated were doing so only for the possible material gain. In an effort to persuade crusaders to focus on spiritual conversion, Bernard said, "We prohibit completely that a truce be made for any reason with these people [Wends] either for money or tribute, until such time as, with the aid of God either their religion or their nation shall be destroyed," which was an condition added to the papal bull. The German monarchy took no part in the crusade, which was led by Saxon families such as the Ascanians, Wettin, and Schauenburgers. Papal legate Anselm of Havelberg was placed in overall command.

== War ==
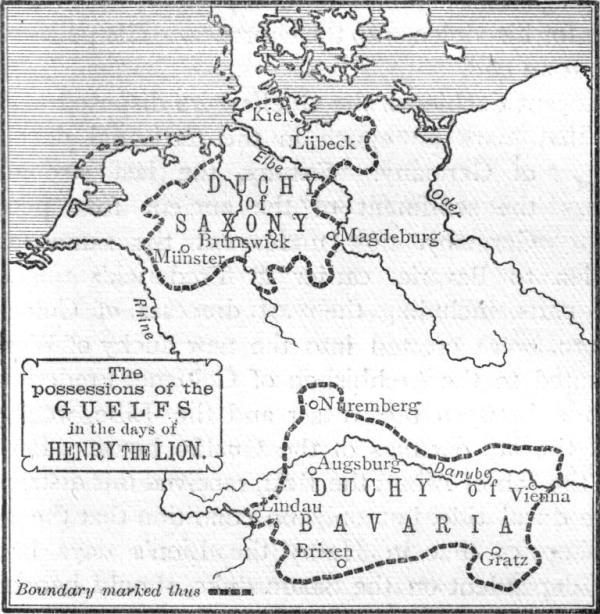
Henry's duchies Saxony and Bavaria

Upset at Adolf's participation in the crusade, Niklot preemptively invaded Wagria in June 1147, and, along with the Wagrians, decimated newly settled Fleming and Frisian villages, leading to the march of the crusaders in late summer 1147. By attacking first, Niklot gave further justification for the Crusade as he legitimized the Wends as a serious threat to Christendom. After expelling the Obodrites from his territory, Adolf signed a peace treaty with Niklot. The remaining Christian crusaders targeted the Obodrite fort Dobin and the Liutizian fort Demmin.

The forces attacking Dobin included those of the Danes Canute V and Sweyn III, Archbishop Adalbert II of Bremen, and Duke Henry the Lion of Saxony. Avoiding pitched battles, Niklot ably defended the marshland of Dobin. One army of Danes was defeated by Slavs from Dobin, while another had to defend the Danish fleet from Niklot's allies, the Rani of Rügen. Henry and Adalbert maintained the siege of Dobin after the retreat of the Danes. When some crusaders advocated ravaging the countryside, others objected by asking, "Is not the land we are devastating our land, and the people we are fighting our people?" The Saxon army under Henry the Lion withdrew after Niklot agreed to have Dobin's garrison undergo baptism.

The Saxon army directed against Demmin was led by several bishops, including those of Mainz, Halberstadt, Münster, Merseburg, Brandenburg, Olmütz, and Bishop Anselm of Havelberg. While their stated goal was to achieve the conversion of the pagans, most also sought additional territory and tithe for their dioceses; Abbot Wibald of Corvey went in the hopes of acquiring the island of Rügen. The Demmin campaign also included the secular margraves Conrad I and Albert the Bear, who hoped to expand their marches. A Royal Polish contingent wanted to add to the Bishopric of Lebus. Marching from Magdeburg, Albert the Bear recovered Havelberg, lost since the 983 Slavic rebellion. The crusaders then destroyed a pagan temple and castle at Malchow. After an unsuccessful siege of Demmin, a contingent of crusaders was diverted by the margraves to attack central Pomerania instead. They reached the already Christian city Szczecin, whereupon the crusaders dispersed after meeting with Bishop Adalbert of Pomerania and Duke Ratibor I of Pomerania.

== Aftermath ==
The Wendish Crusade achieved mixed results. It failed in its immediate objective of either mass conversion or destruction of the Wendish pagans, but managed to weaken them. The inefficiency of Wendish Crusade received criticism, with Helmold attributing it to the crusading armies being more focused on plunder rather than achieving the goals of the Crusade. The crusaders unsuccessfully besieged Dobin and only achieved temporary partial conversions of the Wendish pagans. While the Saxons affirmed their possession of Wagria and Polabia, Niklot retained control of the Obodrite land east of Lübeck. The Saxons also received tribute from Niklot, enabled the colonization of the Bishopric of Havelberg, and freed some Danish prisoners. However, the disparate Christian leaders, mostly Canute and Sweyn, regarded their counterparts with suspicion and accused each other of sabotaging the campaign.

According to Bernard of Clairvaux, the goal of the crusade was to battle the pagan Slavs "until such a time as, by God's help, they shall either be converted or deleted". However, the crusade failed to achieve the conversion of most of the Wends. In preaching the Crusade, Bernard had urged to not make truce or accept any form of tribute, but the crusaders did receive tribute from Niklot as mentioned, which contributed to Bernard's perception of the crusade as a failure. The Saxons achieved largely token conversions at Dobin, as the Slavs returned to their pagan beliefs once the Christian armies dispersed; Albert of Pomerania explained, "If they had come to strengthen the Christian faith ... they should have done so by preaching, not by arms". There was no Wendish clergy established nor any Christian literature translated into the language of the Wends. Without any institutions in place, the forced conversion of the Wends was not sustainable. The only successful conversions were achieved by the Danes. The Danes recaptured the island of Rügen in 1168 and were able to re-Christianize it through the establishment of churches and by allowing Prince Jaromit of Rügen to remain in power after he fully accepted Christianity. The Danes were able to be successful through their method of encouraging Christianity rather than focusing solely on controlling the newly acquired land.

In this way, the Crusade could be viewed as a success in terms of its successful acquisition of Slavic lands as it encouraged colonization by German settlers. It also began a long-lasting crusade against the Wends that lasted the rest of the twelfth century. By the 1160s, most of the Wends had come under the control of the Saxons or the Danes. However, in 1180 when Henry the Lion and Emperor Frederick I Barbarossa had a falling out, the Danes were able to assert political control over a majority of the region. The effects of the Wendish Crusade was long-lasting through the impacts it had on extending political and colonial power in the Baltic region.

== See also ==
- Quantum praedecessores
- Northern Crusades
