= Christian Genschow =

German sculptor (1814–1891)

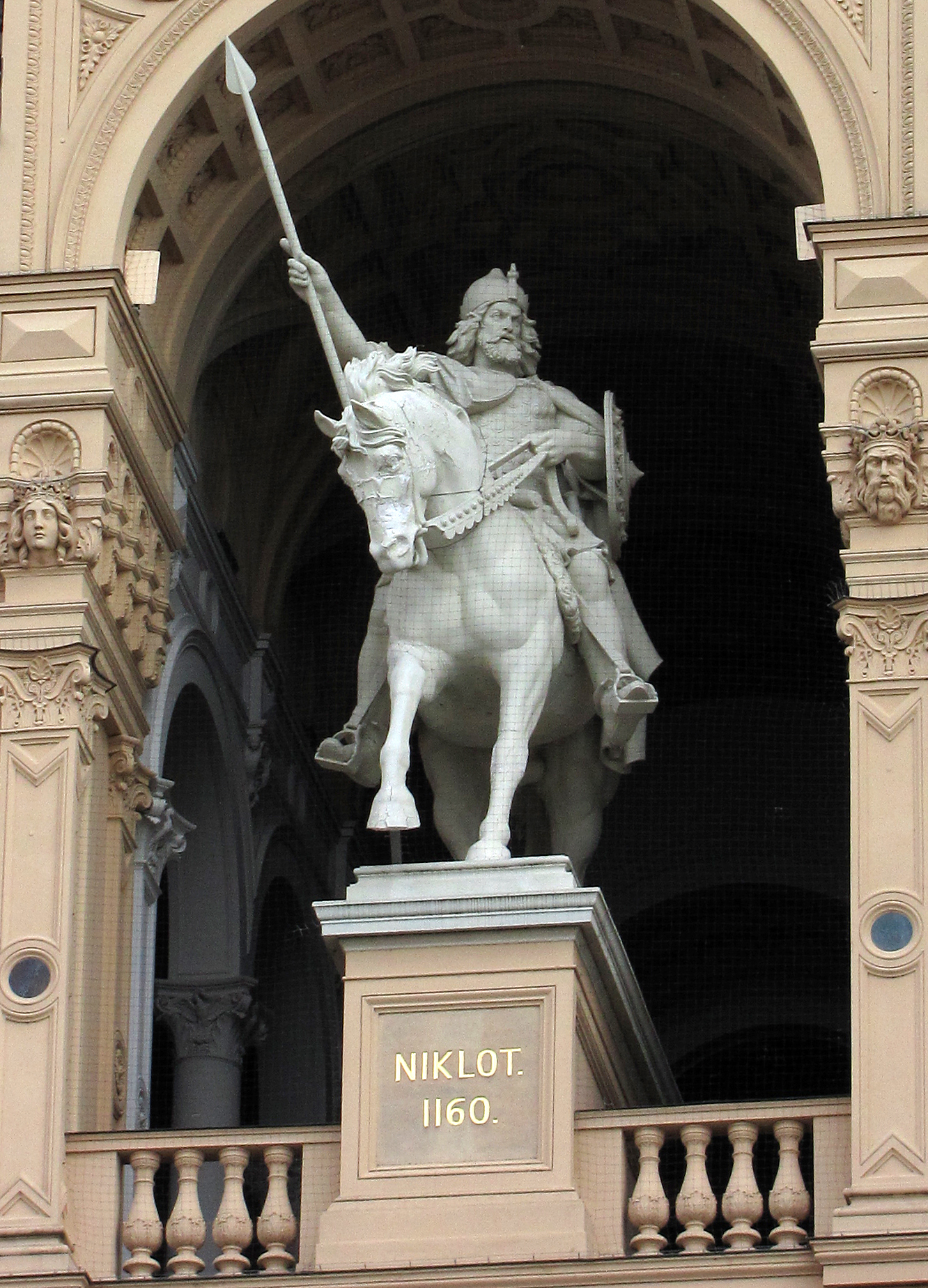
Equestrian statue of the Obotrite leader, Niklot (Schwerin Palace)

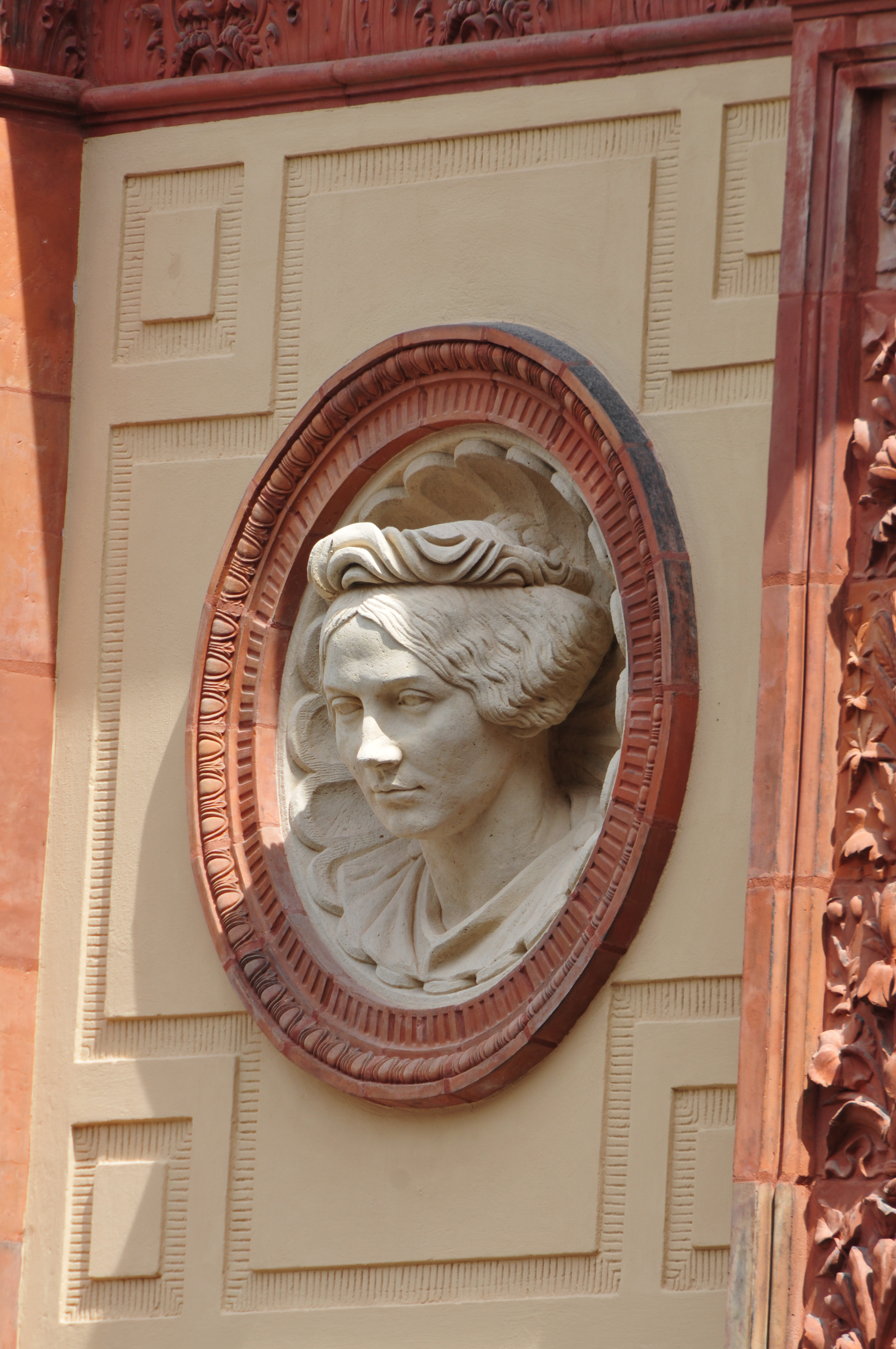
Portrait of Princess Augusta Reuss of Köstritz (Schwerin Palace)

Christian Friedrich Genschow (18 September 1814, Rostock - 1 November 1891, Groß-Lichterfelde) was a German sculptor. Although best known for his works at the Schwerin Palace, most of his creations were in smaller formats, in the tradition of the Berliner Bildhauerschule.

== Biography ==
He was the fourth of thirteen children born to the laborer, Franz Jakob Genschow and his wife. At the age of eleven, he suffered a severe, permanent injury to his left leg when he was scalded with liquid wax. An attempt at being a carpenter's apprentice had to be abandoned, as his leg could not stand the stress.

In 1834, after having decided to pursue a career in art, a scholarship of 60 Thalers was approved by Frederick Francis I, Grand Duke of Mecklenburg-Schwerin, and he was able to study drawing with Johann Friedrich Hesse (1792-1853). After his scholarship award was doubled, he went to study sculpture at the Berlin University of the Arts, where he worked with Ludwig Wilhelm Wichmann (1836-1840) and Christian Daniel Rauch (1840-1842). Later he and several others worked as assistants to Rauch on his Equestrian statue of Frederick the Great. After this, he established his own studio in Berlin-Kreuzberg. From 1838 to 1881, he was a regular exhibitor at the Große Berliner Kunstausstellung.

From 1852 to 1857, he worked on a major commission he received through the intercession of the Director of the Grand Ducal Collections, Georg Christian Friedrich Lisch. He created several statues for the new Schwerin Palace; notably an equestrian statue of the Medieval military leader, Niklot. From 1857 to 1866, he was employed by the Dankberg'sche Institut für architektonische Ornamentik. Until 1876, he received more orders from Grand Duke Frederick Francis II, who awarded him the Gold Cross of Merit of the House Order of the Wendish Crown in 1870, on the occasion of inaugurating the new main building at the University of Rostock, for which he had provided sculptures.

In 1842, he had married Johanne Wilhelmine Ernestine Bohl (1822–1891), with whom he had four children. In 1874, continuing problems with his leg injury forced the amputation of his foot. He worked as a sculptor until 1885. After then, according to the Berlin address book, he apparently made his living as a landlord (Rentier). His grave at the Alter Luisenstädtischer Friedhof has not been preserved.

== Sources ==
- Stüler, Willebrand, Prosch: Das Schweriner Schloss. Berlin 1869.
- Helmut Börsch-Supan: Die Kataloge der Berliner Akademieausstellungen 1786–1850. Vols. 1–3, Berlin 1971.
- Peter Bloch, Sibylle Einholz, Jutta von Simson (Eds.): Ethos & Pathos. Die Berliner Bildhauerschule 1786–1914. Beiträge zur Ausstellung. Berlin 1990, ISBN 3-7861-1598-2
- (in German) Christian Genschow. In: Allgemeines Künstlerlexikon. Die Bildenden Künstler aller Zeiten und Völker (AKL). Band 51, Saur, München u. a. 2006, ISBN 3-598-22791-4, S. 369
- Bernd Schattinger: Christian Genschow (1814–1891). Recherchen zu Leben und Werk eines mecklenburgischen Bildhauers. Schwerin 2015, ISBN 978-3-86062-037-3.
