= Niklot =

Prince of the Slavic Obotrites

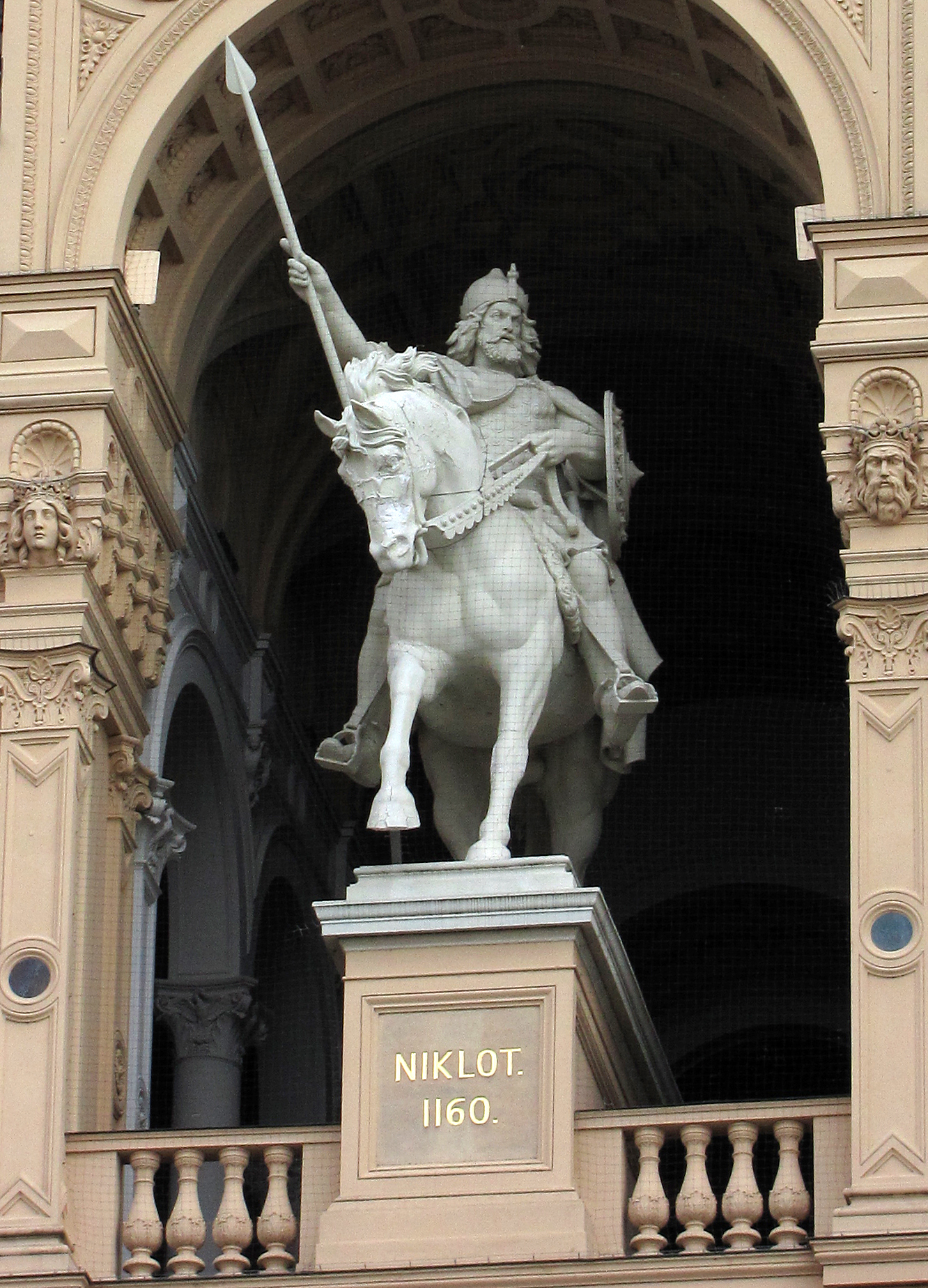
- Statue of Obotrite Prince Niklot at the Schwerin Castle (sculptor, Christian Genschow)
- Died: August 1160
- Issue: Pribislav of Mecklenburg; Wertislaw of Mecklenburg
- Religion: Christianity, possibly Slavic paganism

Niklot or Nyklot (died August 1160) was a chief or prince of the Slavic Obotrites and an ancestor of the House of Mecklenburg. He became chief of the Obotrite confederacy, including the Kissini and the Circipani, between the years 1130 and 1131. He remained in this position until his death in 1160. At the same time he was Lord of (Herr zu) Schwerin, Quetzin and Malchow. For nearly 30 years he resisted Saxon princes, especially Henry the Lion during the Wendish Crusade.

== Resistance ==
Niklot began his open resistance when the German King (later Emperor) Lothar III granted the Obotrite realm to his Danish vassal Canute Lavard. Together with Pribislav of Wagria, son of Budivoj and nephew of Henry, Niklot fought Lothar and Canute. After the murder of Canute in 1131, Niklot and Pribislav partitioned the Obotrite territory, with Niklot receiving the eastern lands. In order to weaken Pribislav in the following years, Niklot allied with Saxon lords, especially Count Adolf II of Holstein, allowing Slavic pirates to attack the Danes.

== Wendish Crusade ==
The prince's Saxon allies turned against him during the 1147 Wendish Crusade. Although Niklot successfully resisted the siege of his fortress at Dobin, he was forced to pay tribute to the Christian crusaders. He subsequently arranged peaceful terms with Adolf of Holstein, Duke Henry the Lion of Saxony and Henry of Ratzeburg.

== Religion ==
After the death of Obotrite Prince Henry, a Christian, Niklot allegedly renounced Christianity in favor of traditional pagan beliefs. However, this is uncertain; according to Helmold's Chronica Slavorum, Niklot promised to Christianize his lands as part of the peace agreement, and in the late 1150s he wrote to Henry the Lion:

Let the god, who is heaven, be your God; you be our god, and it sufficeth us. You honor Him, and in turn we shall honor you.

== Death ==
By 1158, King Valdemar the Great of Denmark began to pay Henry the Lion for assistance, leading Niklot to retaliate. The Danish king and the Saxon duke then allied in 1160. While the Danes harried the coast and distracted the Rani, the Saxons killed Niklot at his stronghold of Burg Werle; the Obotrite territory was largely partitioned by the Christians. Niklot's death ended Slavic control in Mecklenburg up to the Peene River. His son Pribislav recovered his inheritance as Prince of Mecklenburg in 1167 as a Saxon vassal. His other son Wertislaw was the father of Nicholas I, Lord of Mecklenburg.
