= Georg Adolph Demmler =

German architect, socialist and politician

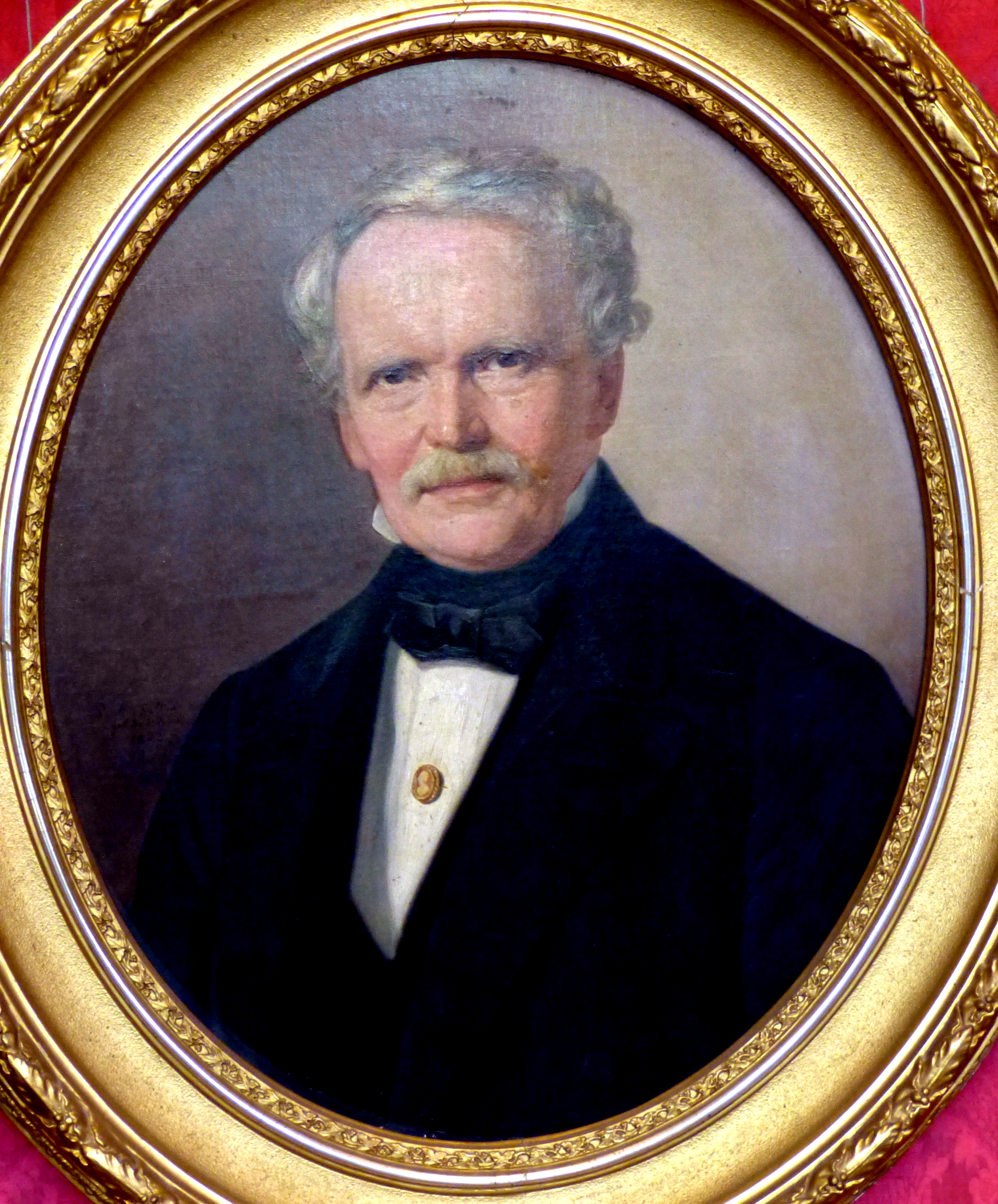
Georg Adolph Demmler; by Pauline Soltau (1873)

Georg Adolph Demmler (22 December 1804, in Berlin – 2 January 1886, in Schwerin) was a German architect, socialist and politician; originally with the German People's Party (DtVP), then the Socialist Worker's Party of Germany (SAP).

== Biography ==
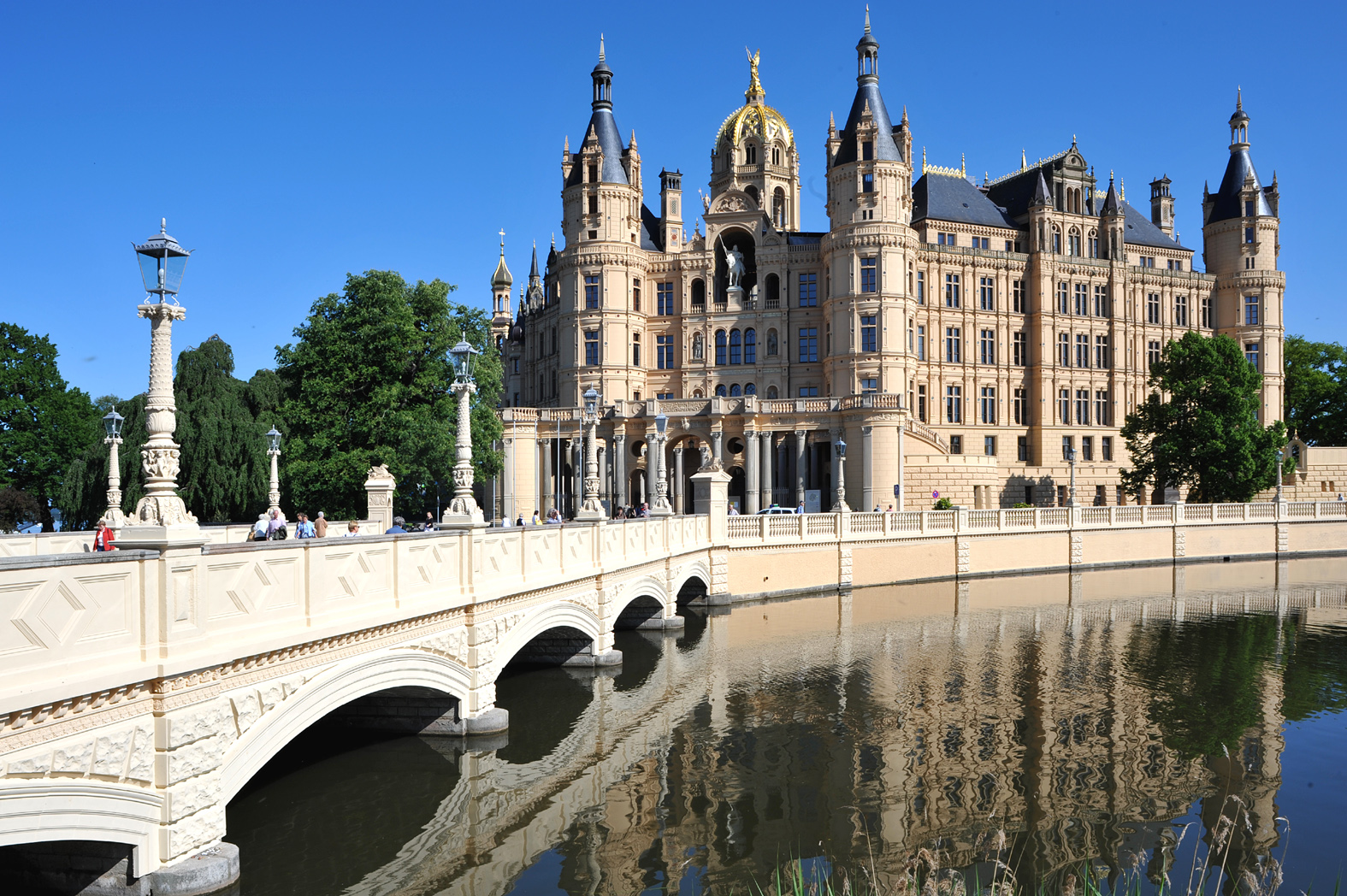
Schwerin Castle

He was born out of wedlock to Johann Gottfried Demmler, a chimney sweep from Güstrow, and Catarina Maria Meincke, the widowed daughter of a brewery owner. He lived with a foster family until he was nine and attended a private school. In 1813, his parents were married and, in 1816, he was legally recognized as their son and brought to Güstrow.

Despite Johann's profession, he was financially secure and a respected member of the Güstrow Citizen's Committee. Georg attended the gymnasium there until 1819, and had private drawing lessons, having shown artistic aptitude while with his foster parents.

After graduating, he went to study at the Bauakademie in Berlin, where his instructors included Karl Friedrich Schinkel and Friedrich Gottlieb Schadow. He was expelled in 1823, due to his membership in the "Berliner Burschenschaft Arminia", a Nationalist students' organization that had been banned. He was however, able to find employment as a surveyor in Potsdam. The following year, thanks to a recommendation from Schinkel, he became an assistant to the Chief Master Builder of Mecklenburg-Schwerin, Carl Heinrich Wünsch.

He worked mainly in Schwerin. From 1830, he gave free lessons at a Sunday school operated by the Freemasons. He was appointed a Master Builder in 1832. Both of his parents died that year, so he used part of his inheritance to make study trips to Frankfurt am Main, Heidelberg and Munich. In 1833, he married Maria Henriette Zickermann, the daughter of a military commander. The marriage remained childless.

In 1835, he was named "Landesbaumeister" (State Master Builder). Two years later, the new Grand Duke, Paul Frederick, enlisted him to help with his ambitious development plans and appointed him "Hofbaumeister" (Court Master Builder). Court officials resented him for his humble background, and Paul Frederick's reign lasted for only five years, but he was able to draft most of the plans that were used for future projects, including the renovation of Schwerin Castle.

=== Political activities ===
He was first exposed to liberal ideas after joining the Freemasons lodge in 1826. Soon, he began to campaign for fair wages and accident insurance and developed sympathies for the labor movement. From 1844 to 1848, he produced a five-volume work called Mecklenburg. Ein Jahrbuch für alle Stände (Mecklenburg. A Yearbook for All Classes), which was censored and banned several times. During this period, in 1845, he was elected to the Schwerin Bürgerausschuss (Citizens' Committee) and campaigned for freedom of the press.

During the German revolutions of 1848–1849, he became involved in controversial issues regarding the Grand Duchy's constitution. Some progress was made, but reactionaries in the nobility were able to roll back those changes so, in 1851, he was accused of disloyalty. Shortly after, he resigned all of his official positions and was dismissed without a pension. Luckily, he still had some of his inheritance and was on friendly terms with Grand Duke Frederick Francis. His work on Schwerin Castle, which had occupied him for over a decade, was completed by Friedrich August Stüler. He then focused on his political activities, travelling throughout Europe to promote the trade union movement. Upon returning to Schwerin in 1857, he was re-elected to the Citizens' Committee.

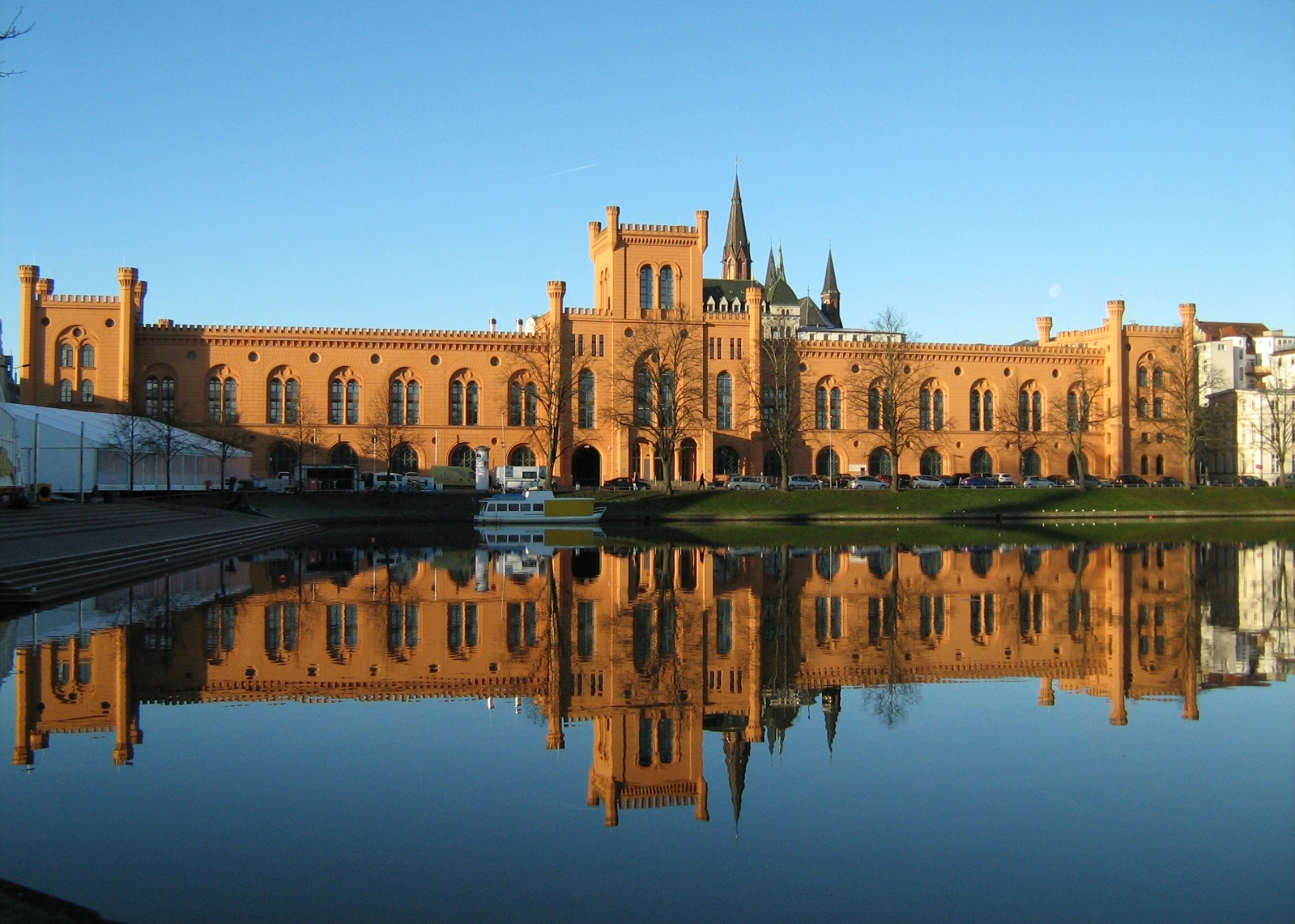
The Arsenal on the Pfaffenteich

In 1859, he was one of the founders of the Deutscher Nationalverein in Frankfurt am Main. He was elected Chairman of the Mecklenburg Trade Association in 1861. During these years, he remained active as an architect. In 1863, he presented an expansion and beautification plan for the city of Schwerin that included major new construction around the Pfaffenteich, a popular pond near the city center.

He was a delegate to the Lausanne Congress of the International Workingmen's Association and was one of the founders of the Peace and Freedom League, an organization devoted to creating a "United States of Europe". His opposition to the unification of Germany, under the leadership of Prussia, led him to participate in the establishment of the German People's Party, a left-liberal group that slowly took a socialist direction, under the influence of August Bebel and Wilhelm Liebknecht.

In 1874, he ran for the Reichstag, to represent several constituencies in Saxe-Altenburg. His 27.3% of the vote was the best showing for a socialist in that area throughout the 70s and 80s. He ran again in 1876 and 1877, when he was elected as a candidate of the Socialist Workers' Party in Leipzig. After passage of the Anti-Socialist Laws in 1878, he chose not to stand for re-election and withdrew to private life.

He died at the age of eighty-one and was interred at the Alter Friedhof, next to his wife (who had died in 1862), with a grave chapel he had designed himself. In his will he decreed that, every year, 1,000 Marks from his estate would be paid to old and disabled workingmen. Due to legal complications, this was never put into practice.
