= See Döpe =

Lake in Mecklenburg-Vorpommern, Germany

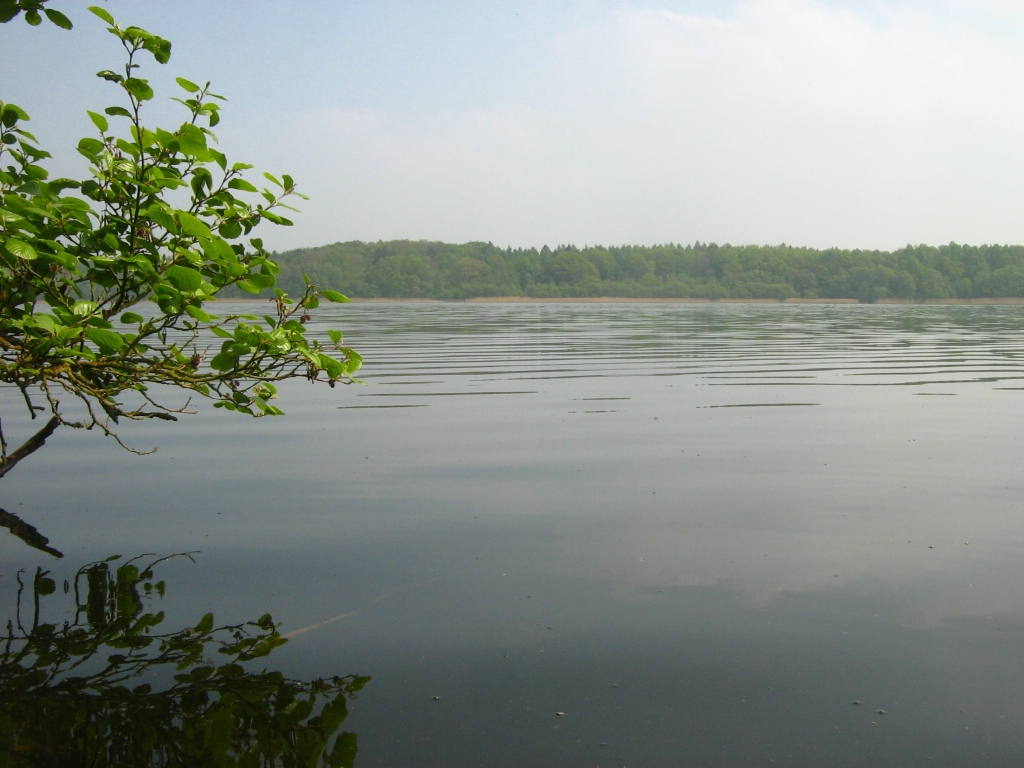

- Location within Mecklenburg-Vorpommern
- Location: Ventschow, Nordwestmecklenburg, Mecklenburg-Vorpommern
- Coordinates: 53°46′38″N 11°31′51″E
- Primary inflows: Wittenbach
- Basin countries: Germany
- Surface area: 0.77 km^{2} (0.30 sq mi)
- Average depth: 3 m (9.8 ft)
- Max. depth: 10.2 m (33 ft)
- Surface elevation: 38 m (125 ft)

See Döpe is a lake in the Nordwestmecklenburg district in Mecklenburg-Vorpommern, Germany. At an elevation of 38 m, its surface area is 0.77 km^{2}.
