= Werner of Münster =

Werner of Steusslingen (German: Werner von Steußlingen) was the bishop of Münster from 1132 until 1151.

Werner was probably related to the lords of Arnstedt and Randerath. His uncles Anno of Steusslingen and Werner of Steusslingen were archbishops of Cologne and Magdeburg, respectively. From Anno he received a canonry at Xanten and from Werner prebends in Halberstadt and Hildesheim cathedrals.

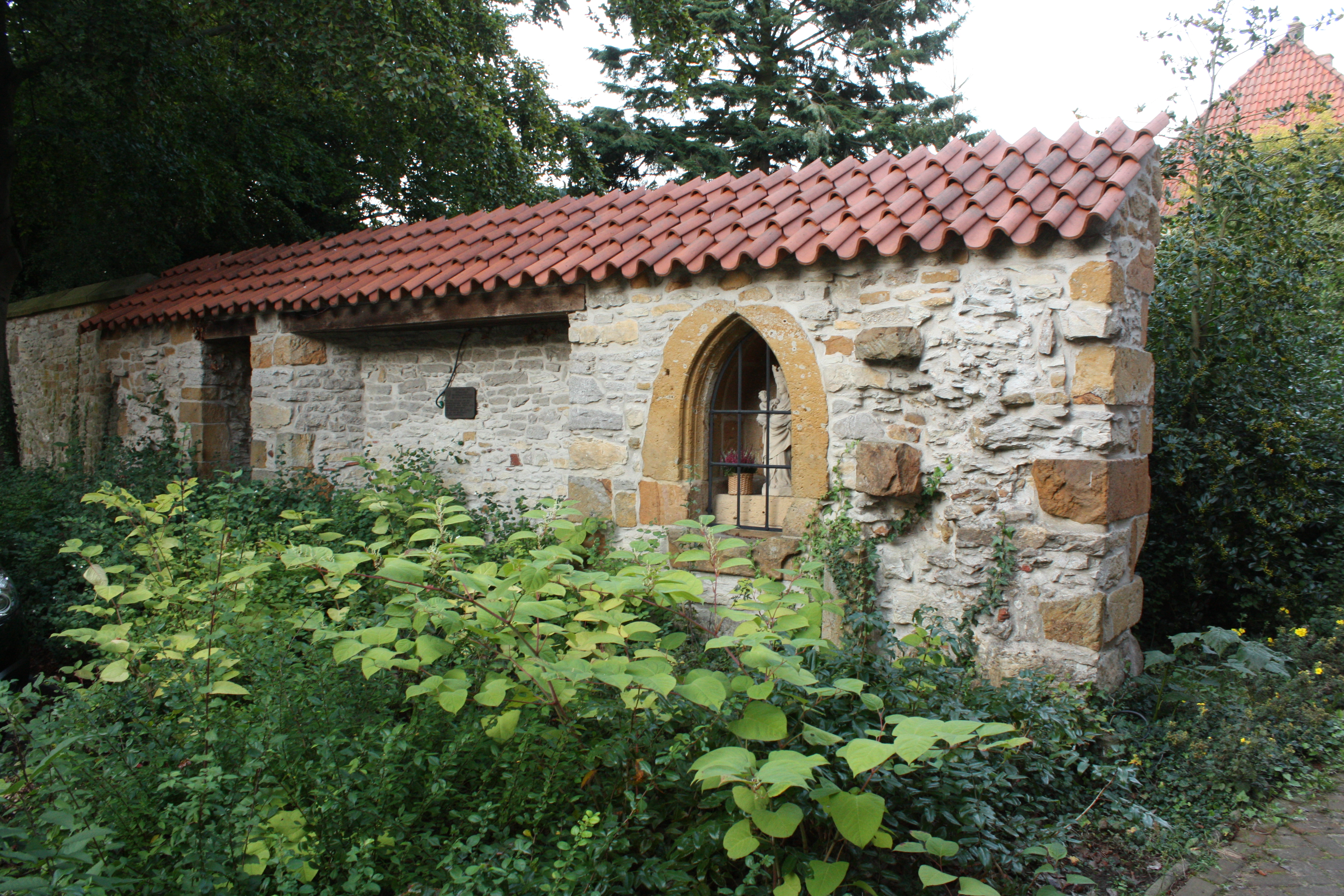
Ruins of Wadenhart chapel

Werner's election as bishop in 1132 was supported by the Emperor Lothair III and Archbishop Bruno II of Cologne. His religious ideas were shaped by the reformers Bernard of Clairvaux and Norbert of Xanten. He was a patron of monastic foundations, especially the Premonstratensians. Early in his episcopate, Werner made donations to the Überwasserkirche. He was less generous to the secular clergy of his diocese, but a grant of wine he made to the canons of Münster Cathedral in 1137 remained one of their perquisites as late as 1574.

In 1134, Werner gave the chapel of Wadenhart to Liesborn Abbey. In 1137, he consecrated a chapel at Prummern, which later fell to the congregation of the Überwasserkirche. In 1142, he confirmed the foundation of Hohenholte Abbey by his own ministerialis, Liudbert von Holenbeck. Werner was also generous to Varlar Abbey and above all to Cappenberg Abbey. He helped facilitate the transfer of Godfrey of Cappenberg's lower body from Ilbenstadt Abbey to Cappenberg, where it arrived on 12 February 1149. He himself solemnly raised the venerated relics in the church on 16 September 1150. In 1151, he founded the Premonstratensian double house of Asbeck.

Werner built the castle of Lohn to defend his diocese's property in Westmünsterland. He attended Lothair III's court regularly and that of Conrad III in 1140, 1142, 1143 and 1149. At the diet held in Cologne on 3 April 1138, he vocally backed the recently elected Conrad. Perhaps because of the leadership of a Premonstratensian, Anselm of Havelberg, Werner participated in the Wendish Crusade of 1147.

Werner died on 1 December 1151. Although he had intended to be buried in the cathedral as of 1137, he was actually buried in Cappenberg.
