= West Slavic =

West Slavic may refer to:

- West Slavic languages, one of three branches of the Slavic languages
- West Slavs, a subgroup of Slavic peoples who speak the West Slavic languages
