= Schwerin Castle =

Castle in Germany, Schwerin Lake

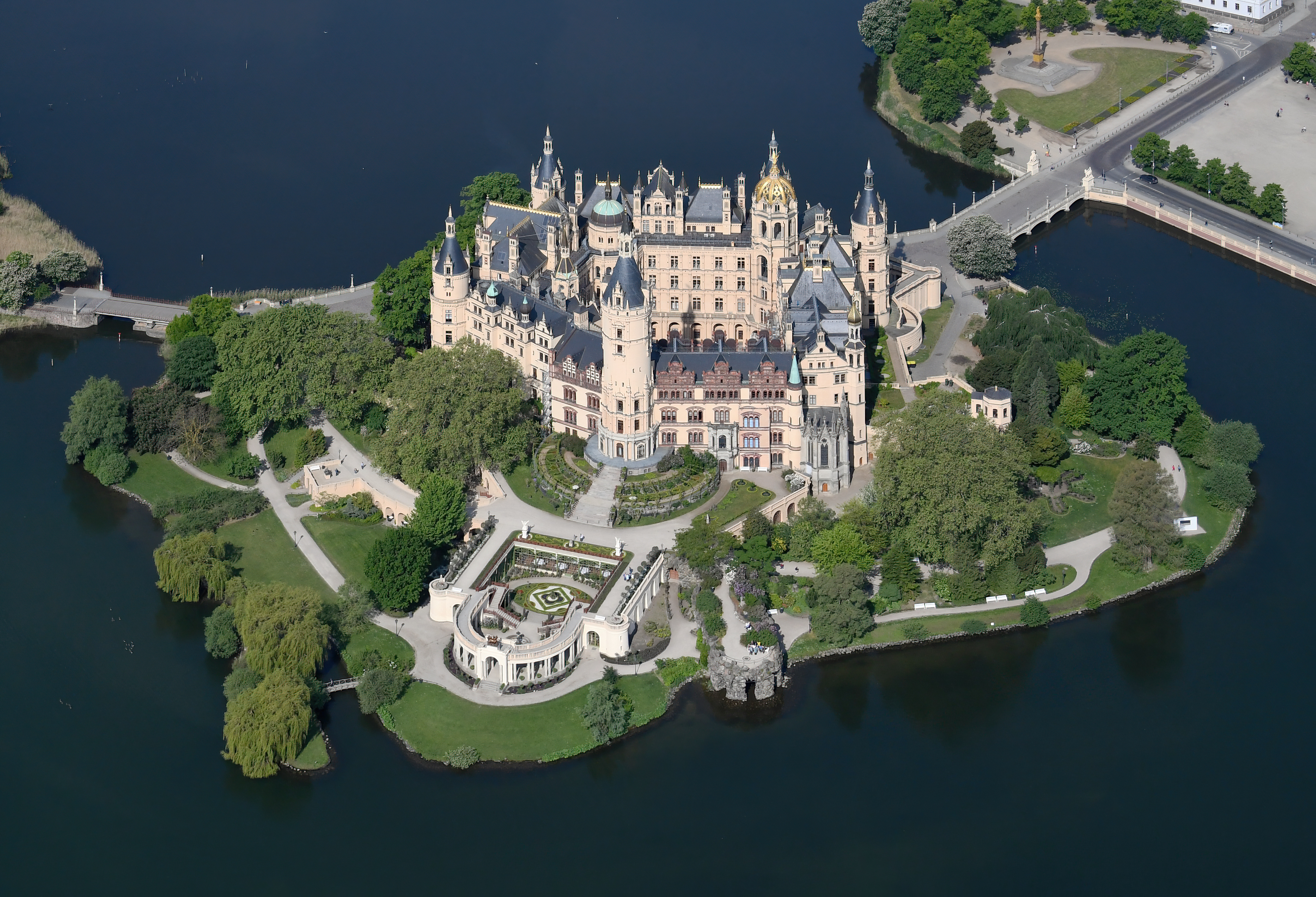
- Schwerin Castle in 2023

- Location within Mecklenburg-Vorpommern Location within Germany
- Alternative names: Schwerin Castle

General information
- Location: Schwerin, Mecklenburg-Vorpommern state, Germany
- Coordinates: 53°37′27″N 11°25′08″E
- Completed: 1857

Website
- www.schwerin.de/kultur-tourismus/sehenswuerdigkeiten/schloss-schwerin/

UNESCO World Heritage Site
- Official name: Schwerin Residence Ensemble
- Type: Cultural
- Criteria: iv
- Designated: 2023 (46th session)
- Reference no.: 1705

Schwerin Castle (German: Schweriner Schloss, German pronunciation: [ʃveˈʁiːnɐ ˈʃlɔs] also known as Schwerin Palace, (German: [ʃveˈʁiːn] or German pronunciation: [ʃvɛˈʁiːn]) is a 19th-century Schloss built in the historicist style located in the city of Schwerin, the capital of Mecklenburg-Vorpommern state, Germany. It is situated on an island in the city's main lake, Lake Schwerin.

For centuries, the castle on the present site was the residence of the dukes and grand dukes of Mecklenburg and later Mecklenburg-Schwerin, although few parts of the pre-19th-century castle have survived. Today, parts of the castle serve as the seat of the Mecklenburg-Vorpommern state parliament (German: Landtag) while other parts are used for the palace museum, a restaurant, and cultural events, like open-air theatre in the courtyard.

Significant parts of the current palace were built between 1845 and 1857 as a collaboration between the eminent historicist architects Gottfried Semper, Friedrich August Stüler, Georg Adolf Demmler, and Ernst Friedrich Zwirner. The castle is regarded as one of the most important works of Romantic historicism in Europe, and is nicknamed the "Neuschwanstein of the North".

In 2024, Schwerin Castle was added to the UNESCO World Heritage List.

== History ==
=== Early years ===
The first records of a structure at this location date from AD 973, a fort belonging to the Polabian Slav tribe of the Obotrites on an island in the large lake of Schwerin.

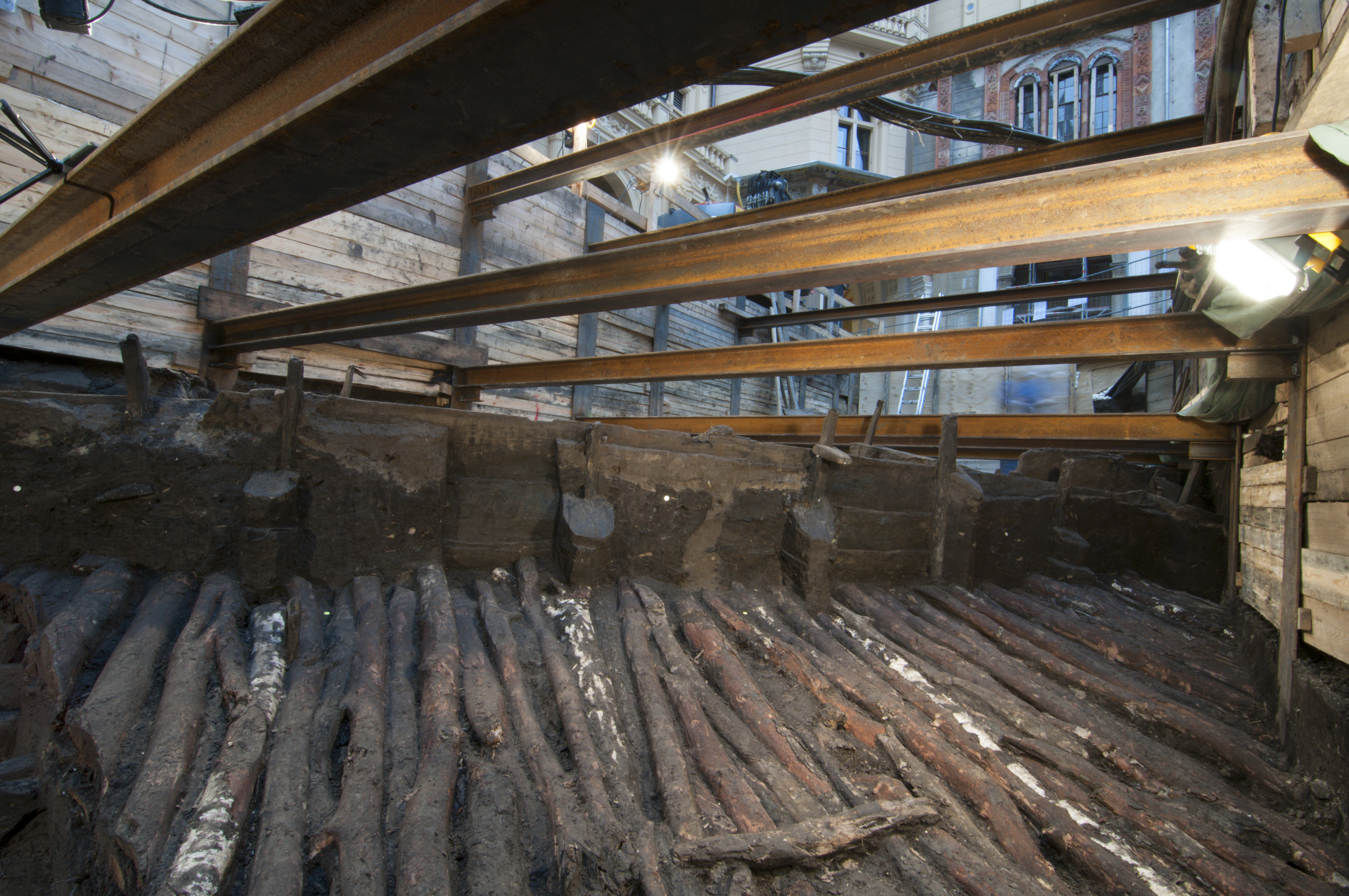
Exposed Slavic castle mound, 2014

In 1160, the fort became a target of Germanic noblemen planning to expand their territory eastward under the leadership of Henry the Lion (1129–1195). The Obotrites under Niklot destroyed the fort but left because of the Germanic military dominance. The German conquerors recognised the island's strategic and aesthetically interesting location and started building a new fort. The foundation of the city of Schwerin took place in the same year. Schwerin became the seat of a bishopric.

In 1167, Henry gave the County of Schwerin to his vassal Gunzelin von Hagen, and the rest of the country around the city was returned to Niklot's son Pribislav, forming a hereditary ducal line that lasted until 1918. In 1358, the County of Schwerin was purchased by the descendants of Niklot, who had been elevated to Dukes of Mecklenburg in 1348. They soon relocated further inland from Mikelenburg, near the city of Wismar, to Schwerin. During the late Gothic era, the growing prosperity and position of the dukes led to a growing need for a representative castle, which meant architectural changes to the fortress settlement. The Bishop's House (Bischofshaus) from that period remains in a grave.

=== Renaissance (15th–18th centuries) ===
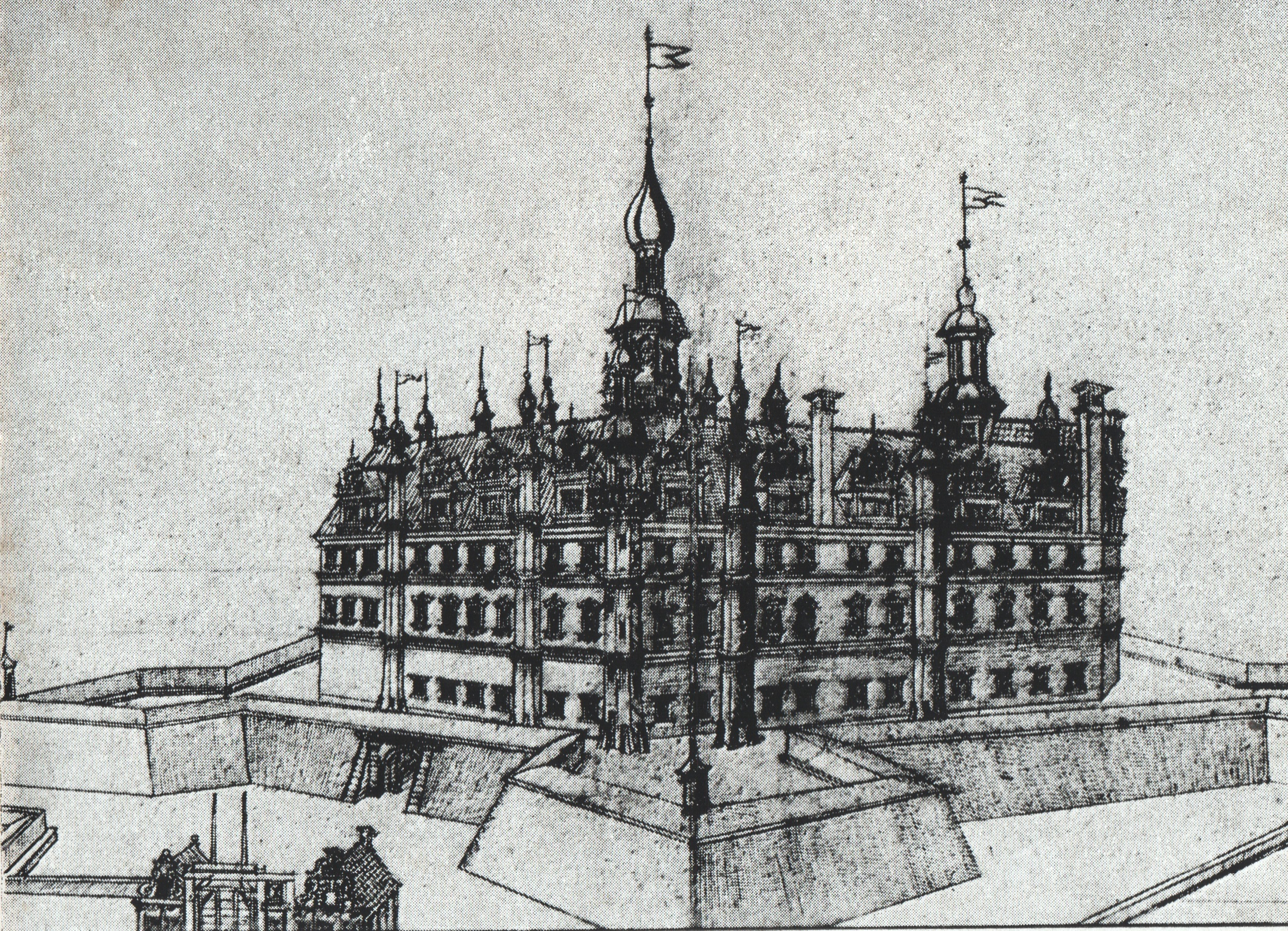
The fortified castle and its bastions, 1617

Under John Albert I, Duke of Mecklenburg (1525–1576), the building experienced important changes. The fort became a palace, and its defensive functionality was replaced with ornamentation and concessions to comfort. The use of terracotta during the Renaissance was dominant in North German architecture, and Schwerin's terracotta was supplied from Lübeck.

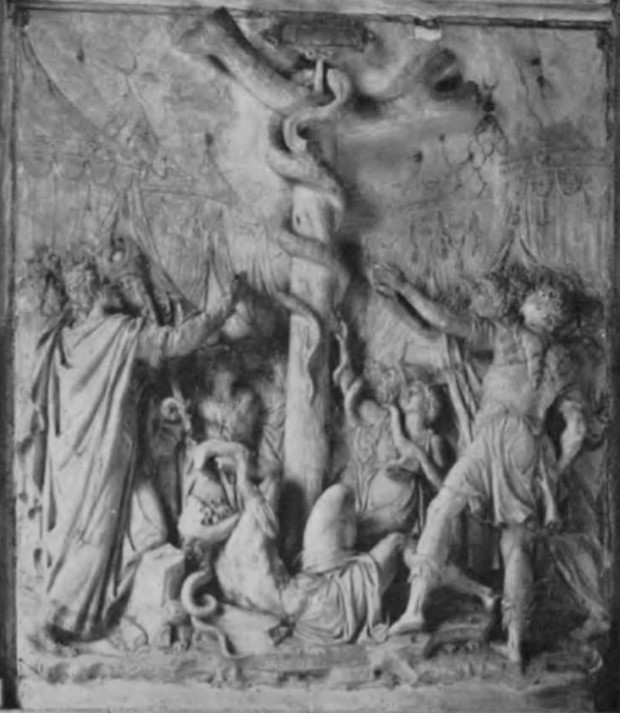
The Elevation of the Brazen Serpent by Willem van den Broecke in the chapel

A few years after reworking the main building itself, from 1560 to 1563, John Albert rebuilt the palace's chapel. It became the state's first new Protestant church. The architecture was inspired by churches in Torgau and Dresden. The early Venetian Renaissance gate, its gable showing the carrying of the cross, was made by Hans Walther (1526–1600), a sculptor from Dresden. Windows on the northern face show biblical illustrations by Flemish artist Willem van den Broecke (also known as "Paludanus"; 1530–1579).

Despite its island site, the ducal residence needed additional defences; sometime in the middle of the 16th century, bastions were established to the northwest, southwest and southeast. They were probably built by the same Italian architects who, under Francesco a Bornau, also designed the Dömitz Fortress. The bastions were modified several times later and are still standing today.

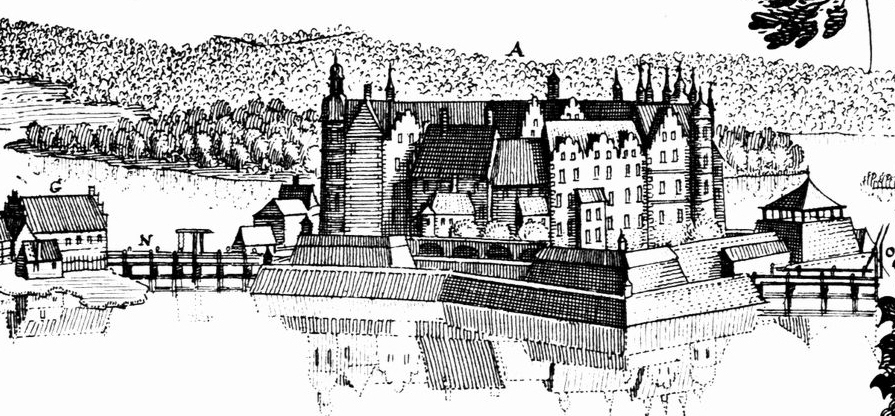
Schwerin Castle in 1653

Before the Thirty Years' War, the architect Ghert Evert Piloot, who had entered Mecklenburg's service in 1612, made plans to completely rebuild the palace in the style of the Renaissance in the Low Countries. In 1617, work began under his supervision but soon had to cease because of the war. Piloot's plans were partially realized between 1635 and 1643: the house above the palatial kitchen and that above the chapel were razed and given Dutch Renaissance style façades.

During this period, a half-timbered building was constructed near the chapel to house the archducal collection of paintings. Also, the Teepavillon (tea house) was built. The court moved to Ludwigslust Palace in 1756.

=== 19th century onward ===
In 1837, the ducal residence moved back to Schwerin, but the building was in relatively bad condition, and the Grand Duke disliked the individual buildings' incongruent origins and architectural styles.

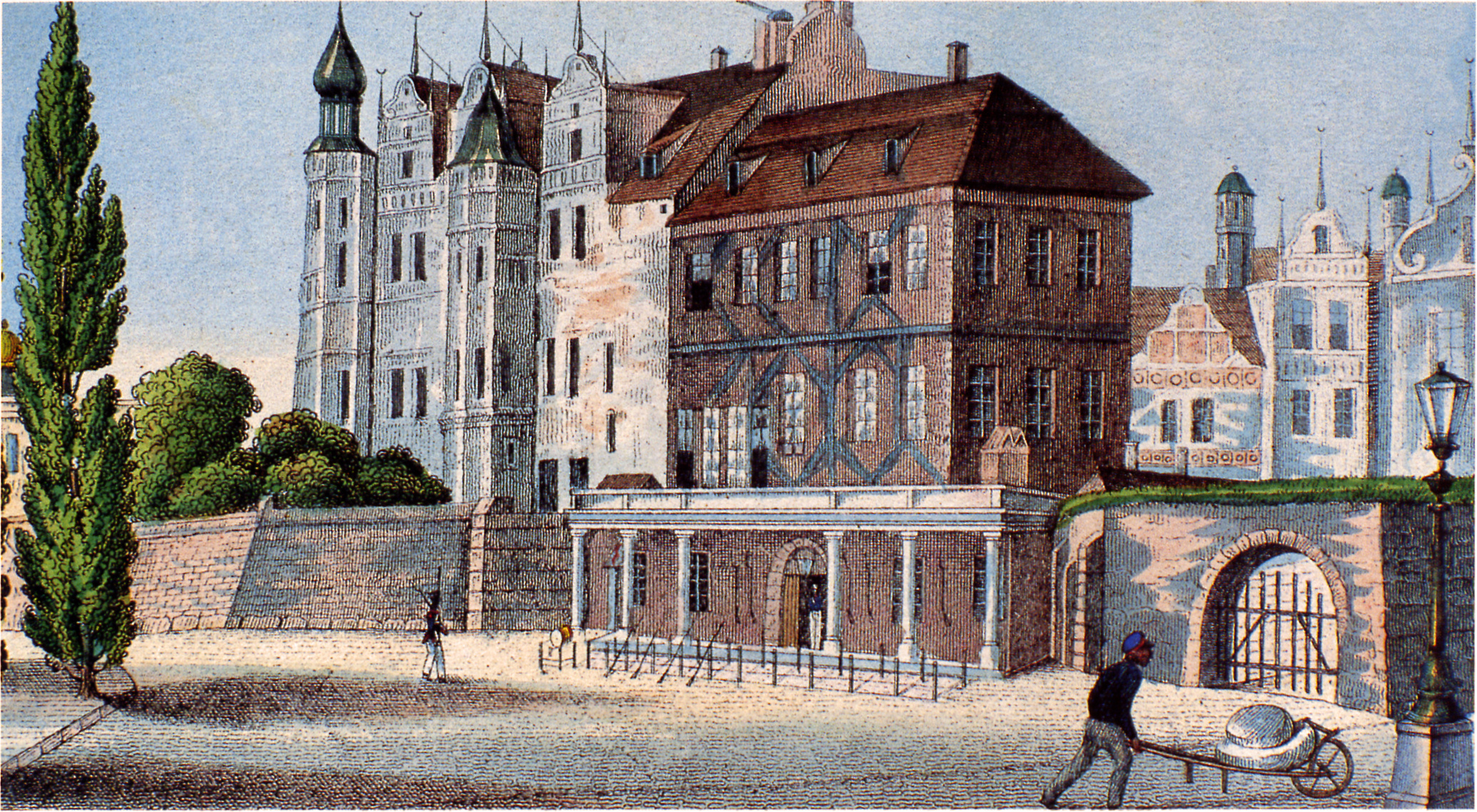
Just before the start of the transformation: 1845

Grand Duke Friedrich (1800–1842) instructed his architect Georg Adolph Demmler (1804–1886) to remodel the palace. A few months later, construction was halted by his successor, Friedrich Franz II (1823–1883), who wanted a complete reconstruction of the historic site. Only some parts of the building dating from the 16th and 17th centuries were retained.

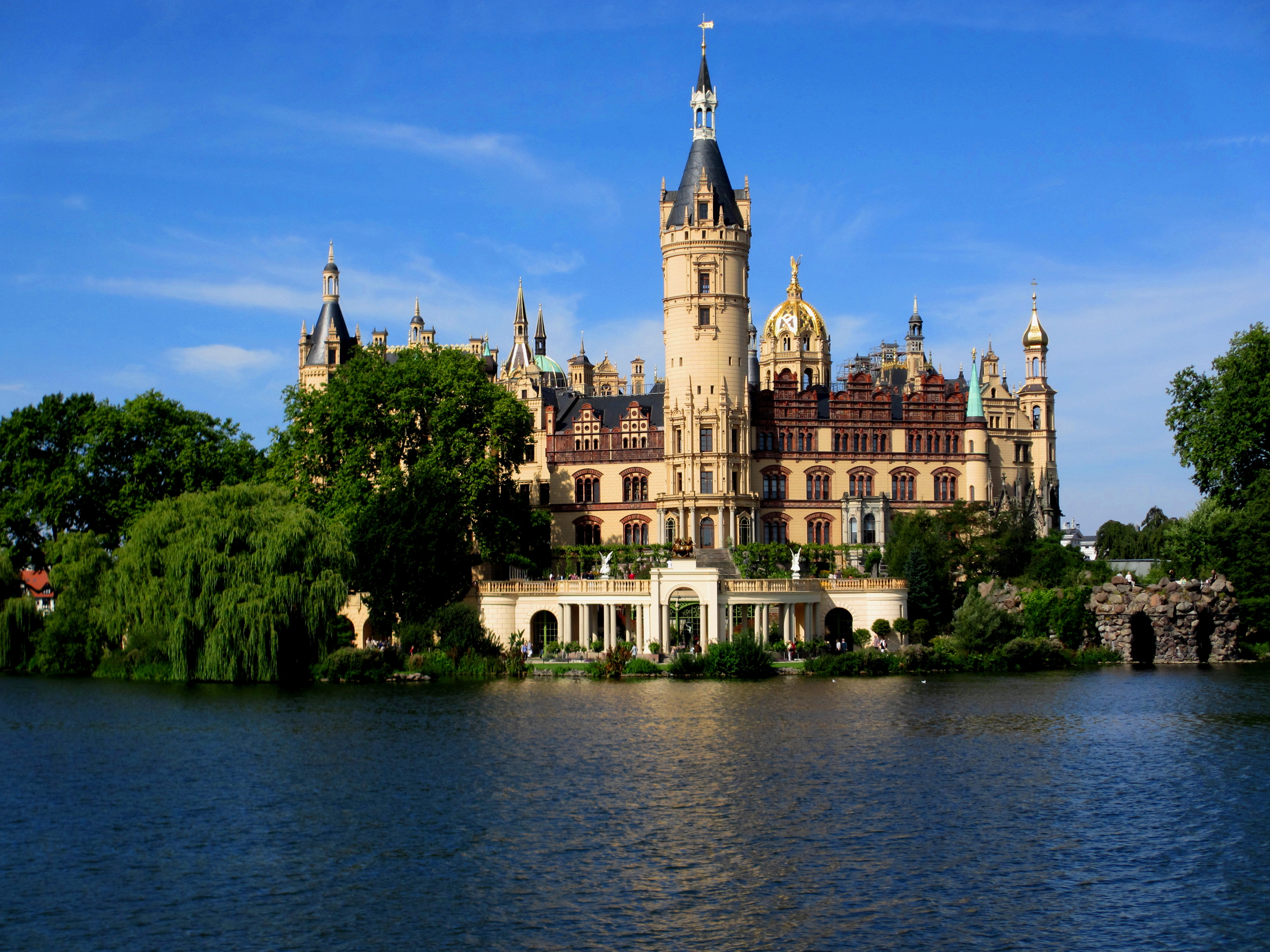
The Palace seen from the waterside, 2012

Dresden architect Gottfried Semper (1803–1879) and Berlin architect Friedrich August Stüler (1800–1865) could not convince the Grand Duke of their plans. Instead, Demmler included elements from both of them into his plan, but found inspiration in French Renaissance castles. The castle became the most admired masterpiece of the student of Karl Friedrich Schinkel. He also planned a government building in 1825–1826 located at Schlossstraße (today the State Chancellery). Renaissance châteaux of the Loire Valley (such as Chambord) also inspired him and contributed to the construction from 1843 until 1851. His successor, Stüler, again made a few alterations, including an equestrian statue of Niklot and the cupola.

Heinrich Strack (1805–1880) from Berlin was chosen for the interior design. Most of the work was carried out by craftsmen from Schwerin and Berlin. A fire destroyed about a third of the palace in December 1913. Only the exterior reconstruction had been completed when the revolution of 1918 resulted in the abdication of the Grand Duke. The castle later became a museum and, in 1948, the seat of the state parliament. The German Democratic Republic used the palace as a college for kindergarten teachers from 1952 to 1981. Then it was a museum again until 1993. The Orangerie had been a technical museum since 1961. From 1974 on, some renovated rooms were used as an art museum.

Since late 1990, it has once again been a seat of government as the seat of the Landtag (the state assembly of the State of Mecklenburg-Vorpommern). Since then, there have been massive preservation and renovation efforts. Most of these were finished by 2019.

== Ghost of Petermännchen ==
The ghost Petermännchen ("little Peterman") is said to roam the halls of the Schweriner Schloss. This invisible little creature is said to be no more than a few feet high and is often depicted in clothes from the 17th century, something resembling a cavalier. Other legends describe him as a long-bearded blacksmith, night watchman, or prankster to those who would seek to harm or steal from the castle.

== Gallery ==
View from the Schlossgarten

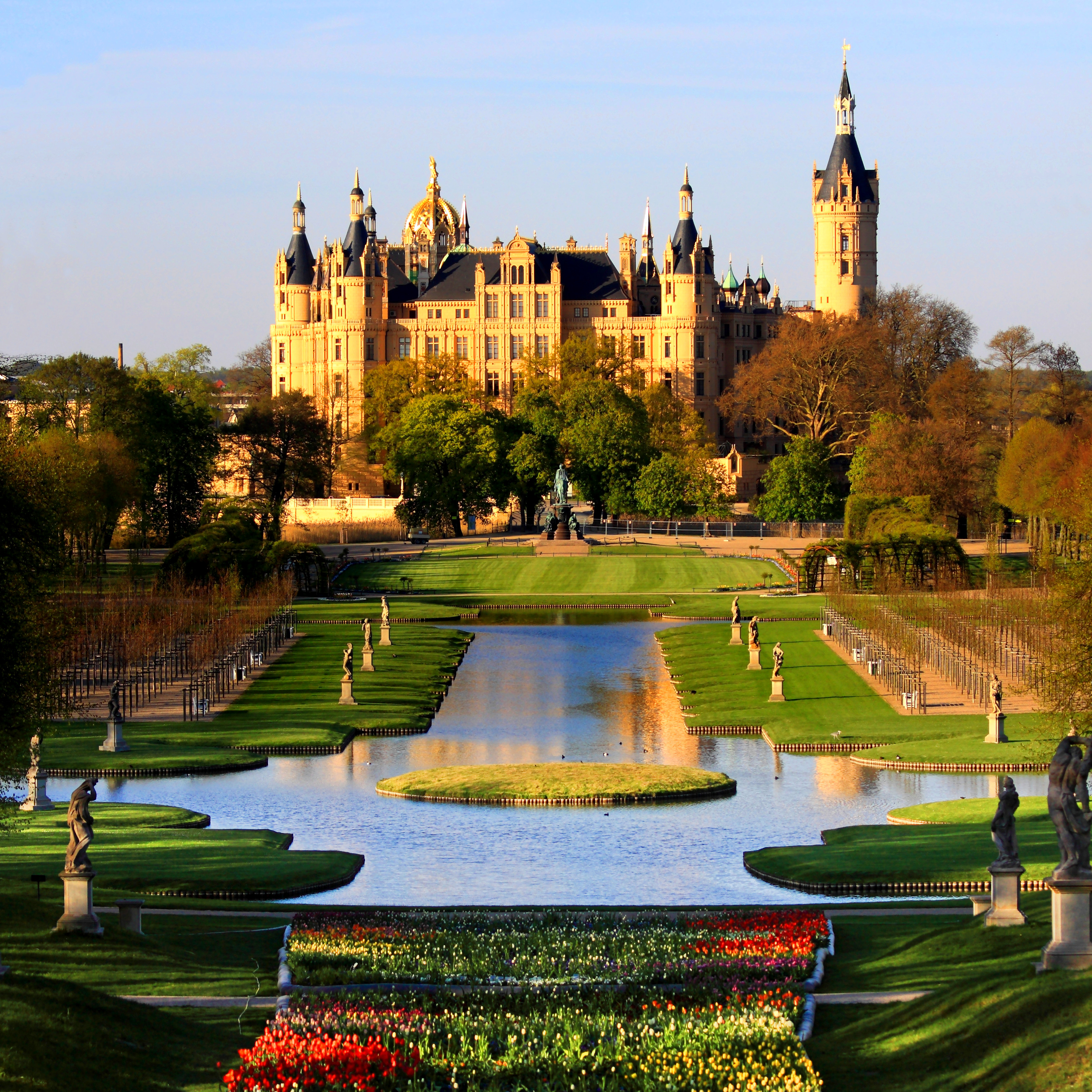

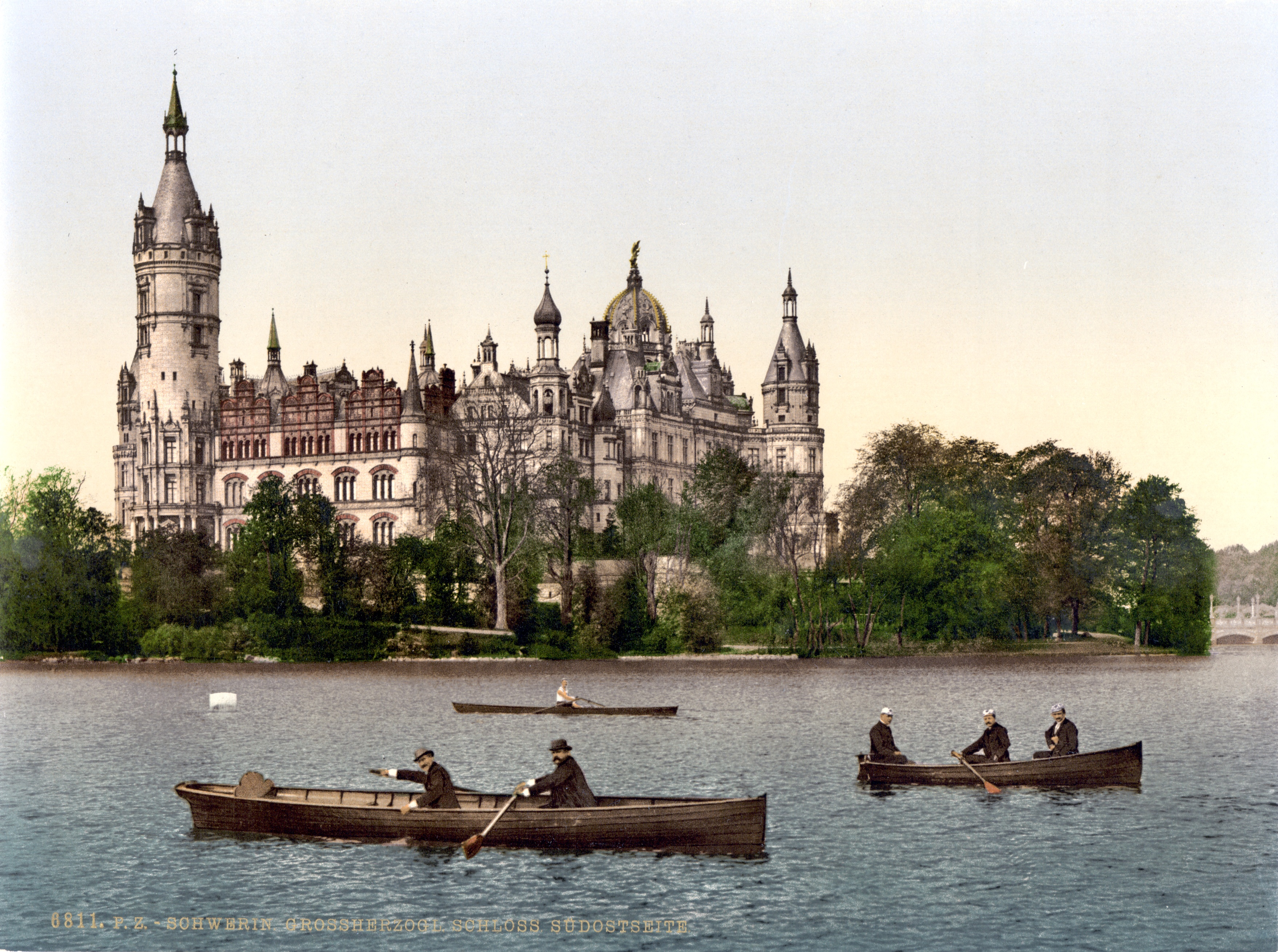
19th century image

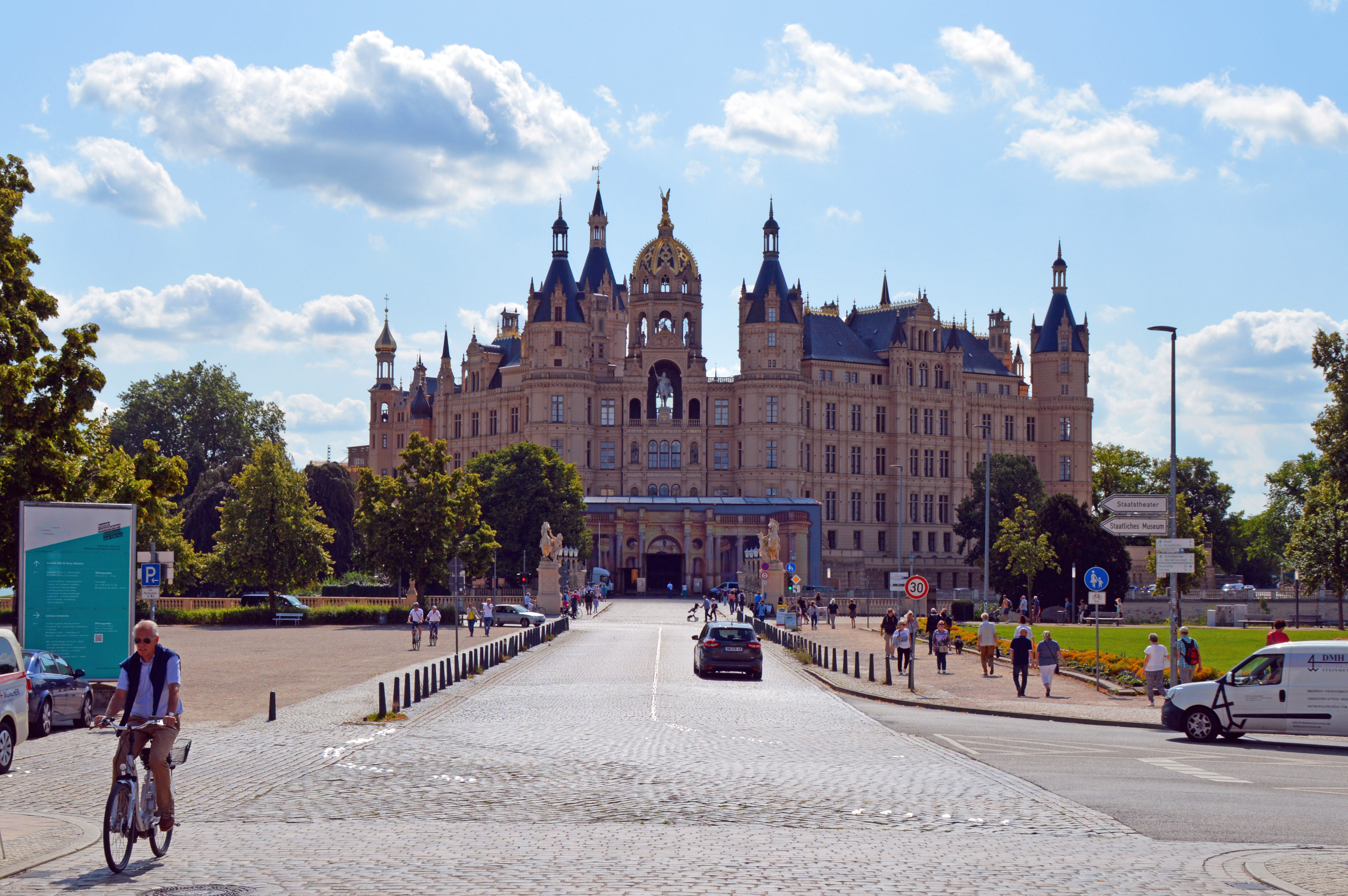
Schwerin Palace front view

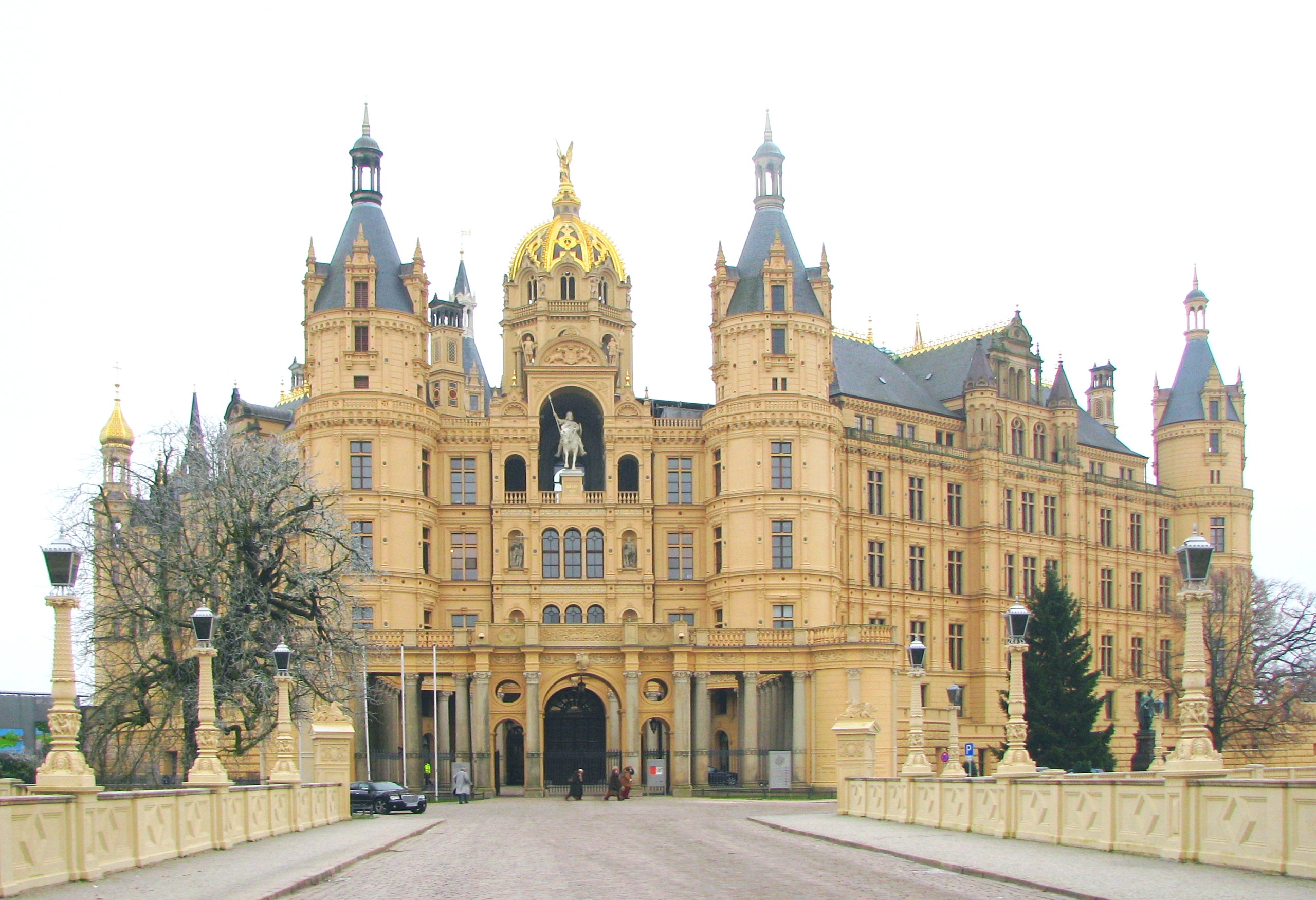
Castle Schwerin: entrance portal

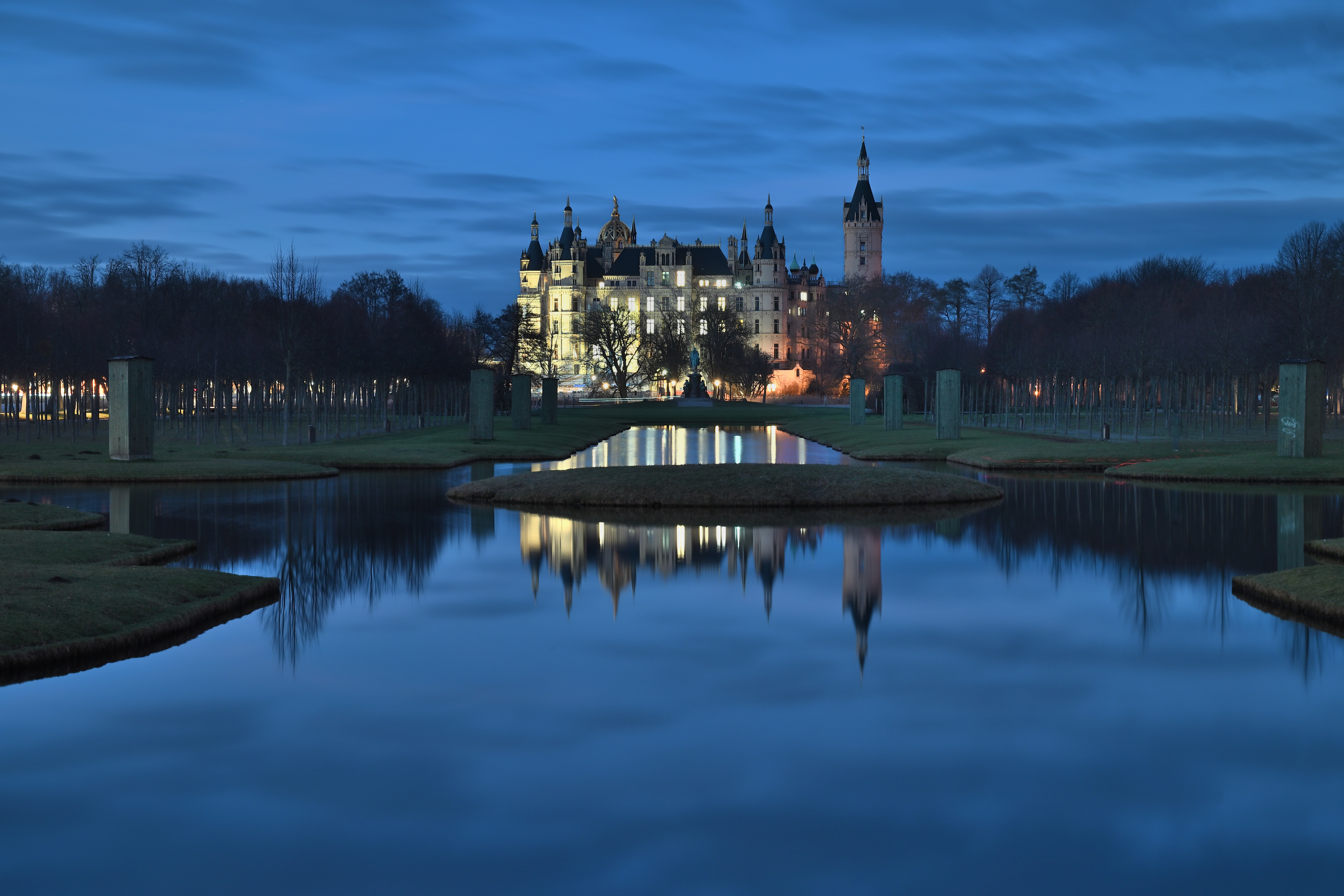
The castle in the blue hour

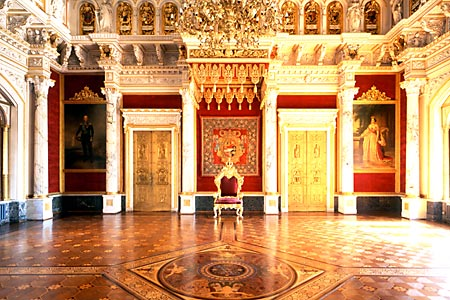
The Grand Duke's throne

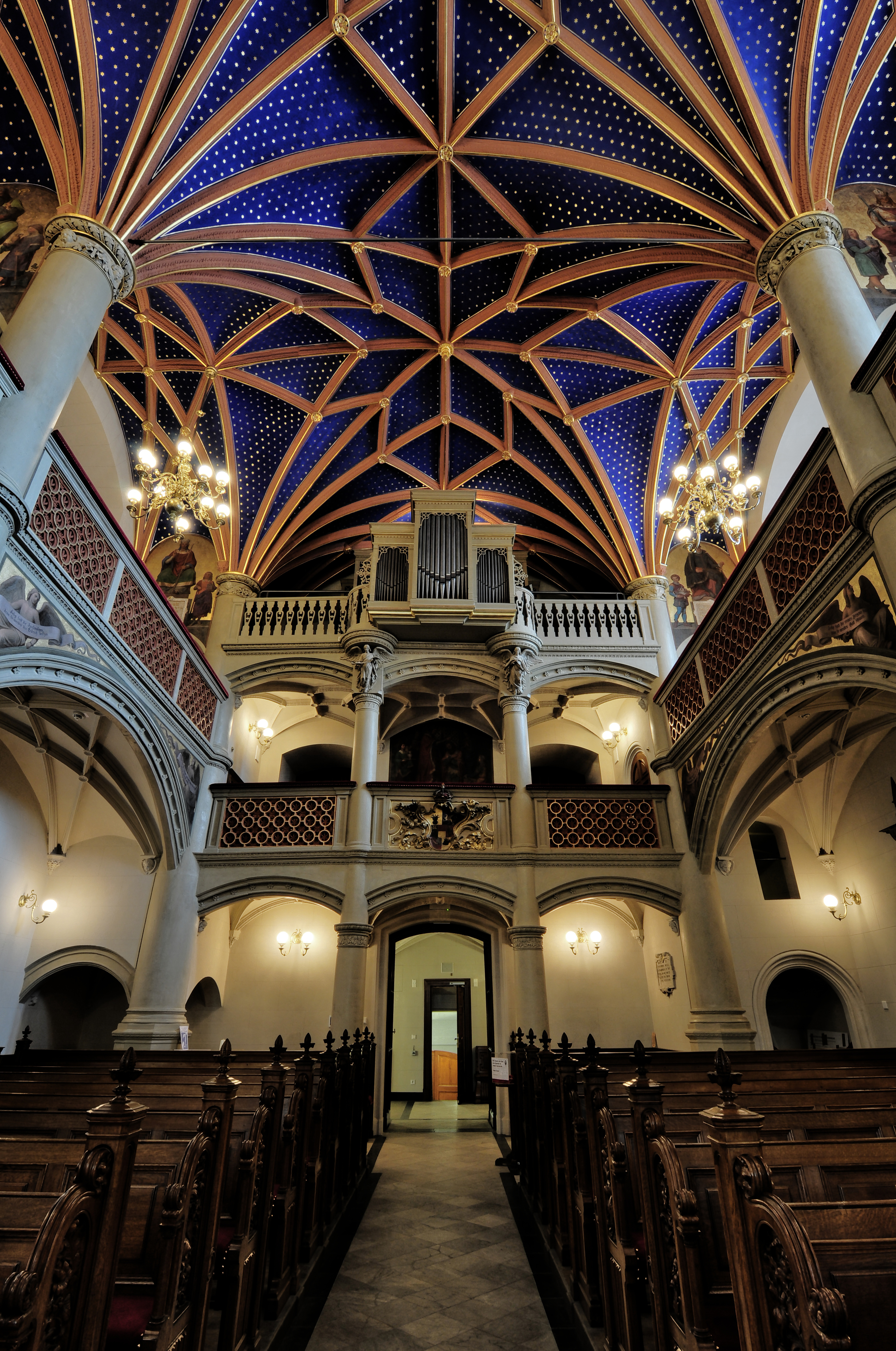
The chapel

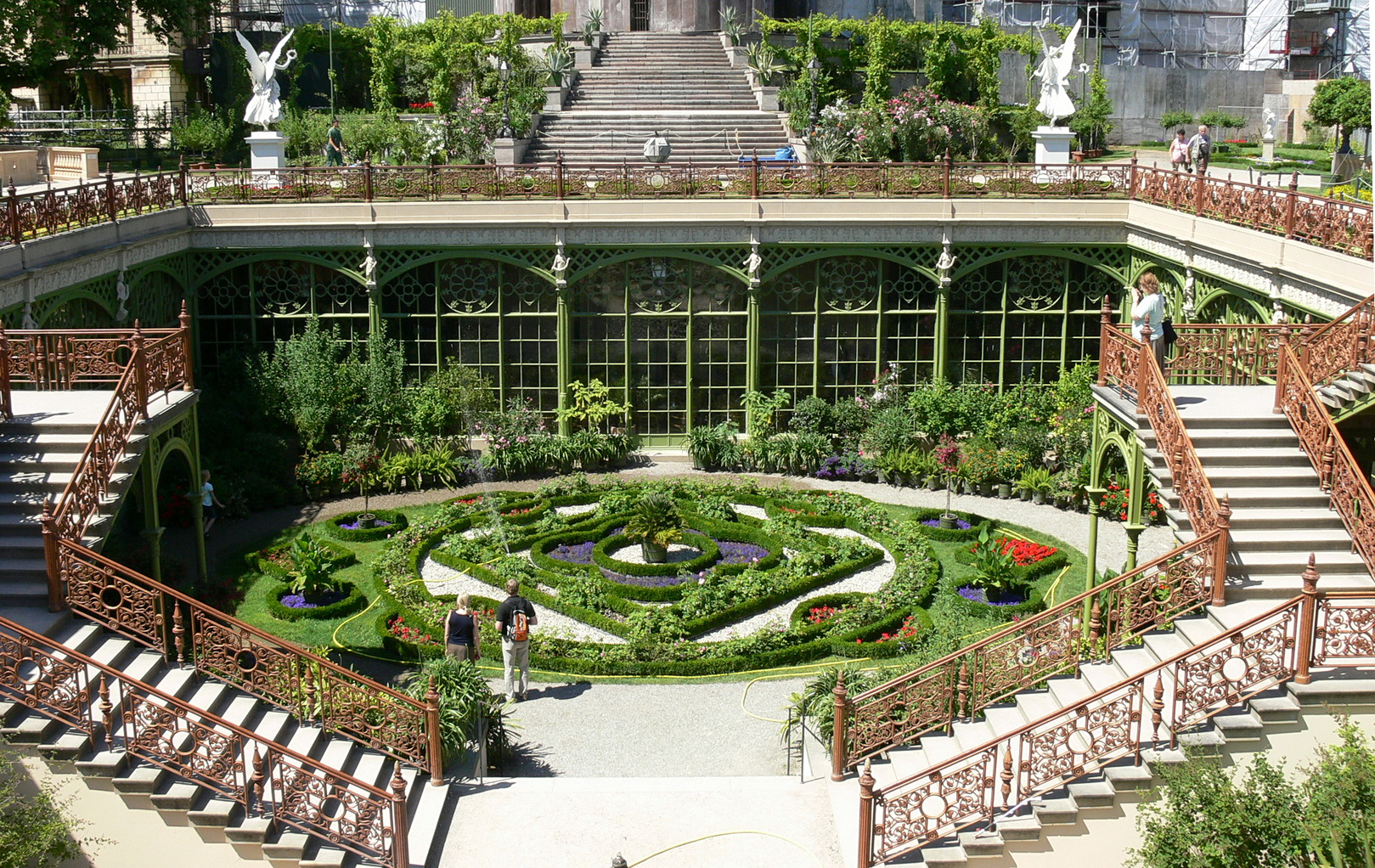
The Orangery

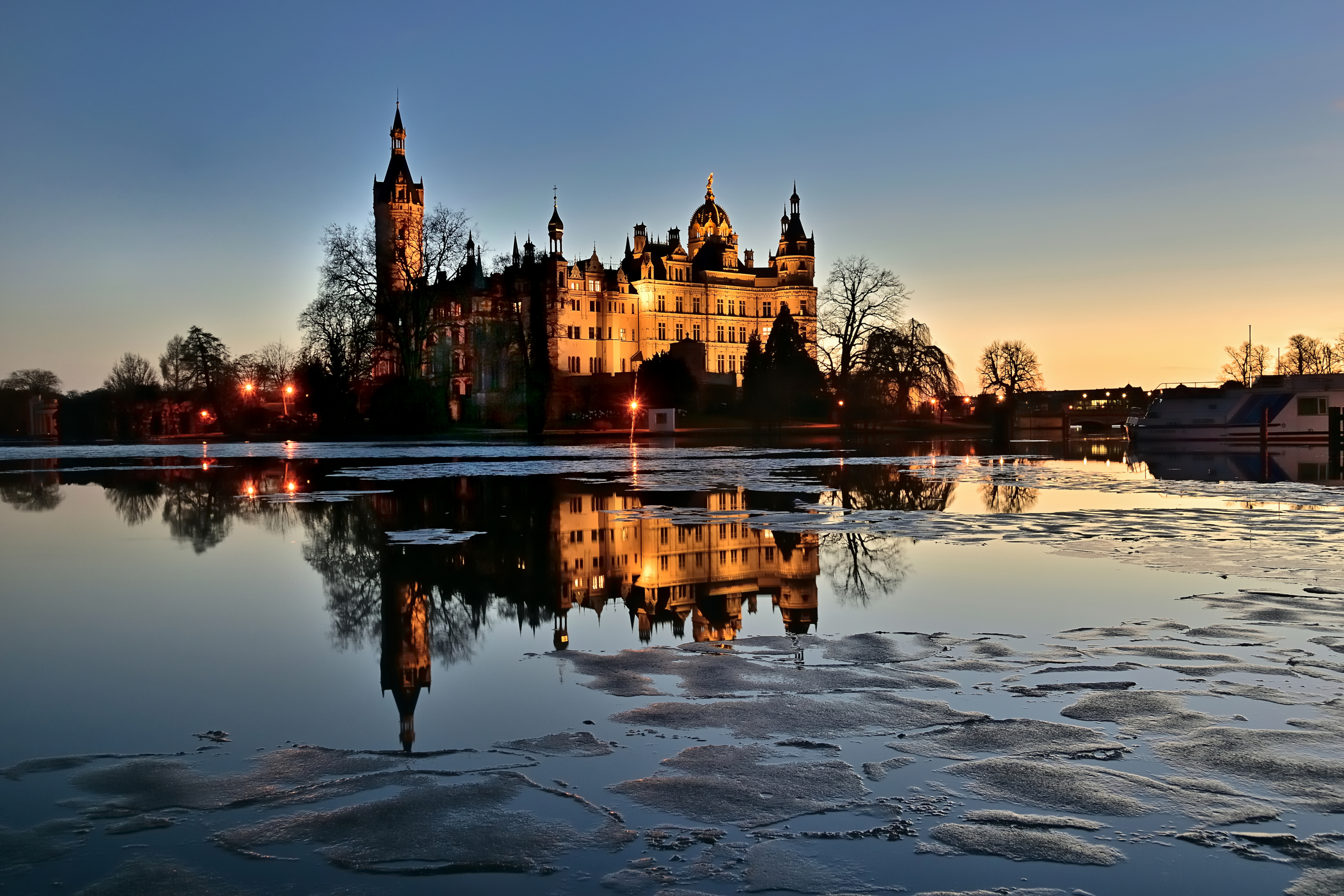
The castle view on a winter evening

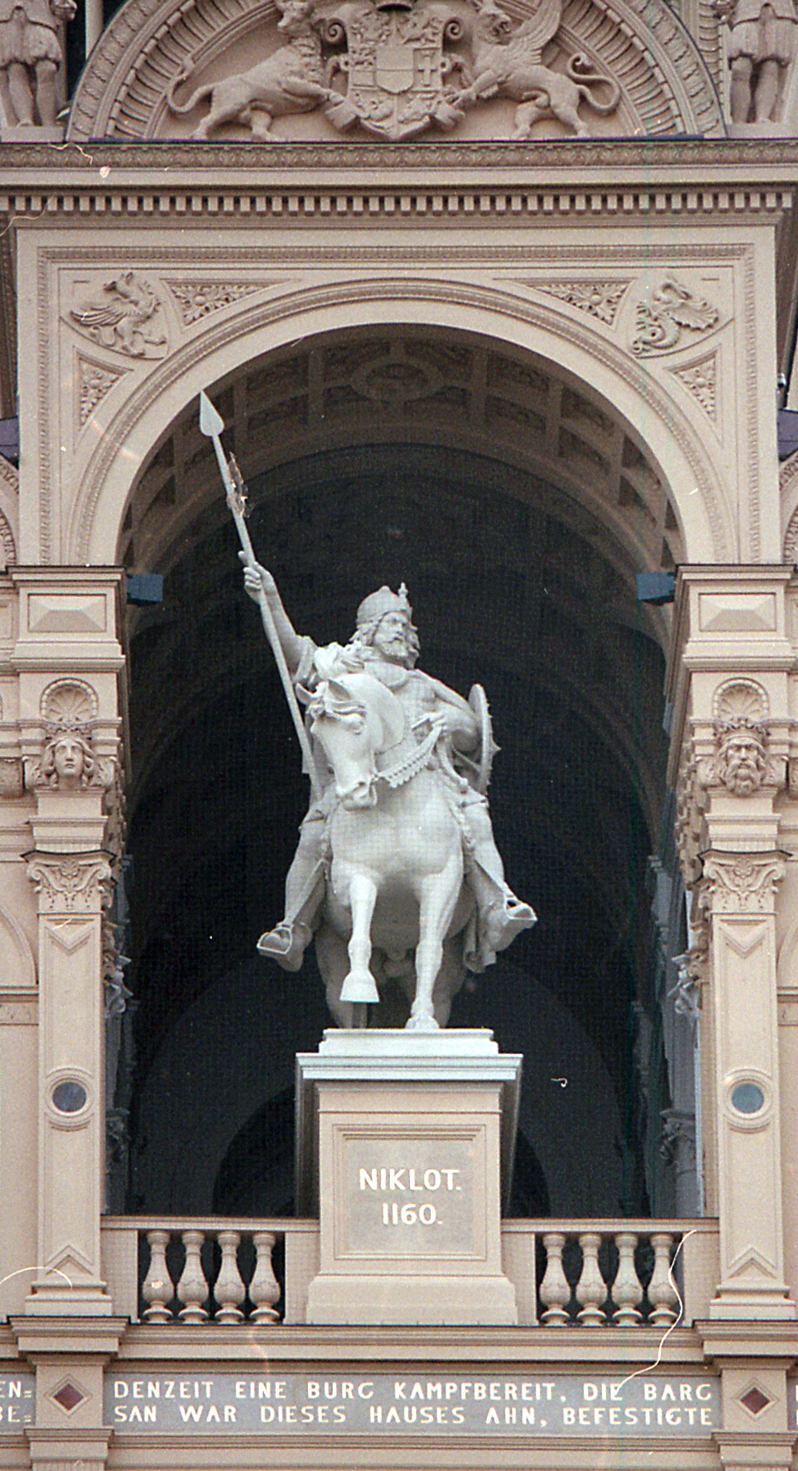
A statue of the Obotrite Prince Niklot (sculptor: Christian Genschow)

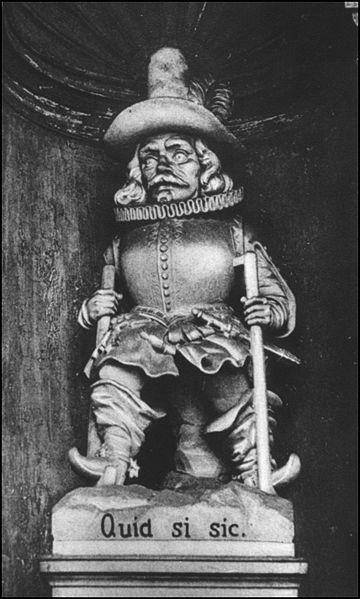
Petermännchen, an 1856 sculpture by Heinrich Petters at Schwerin Palace

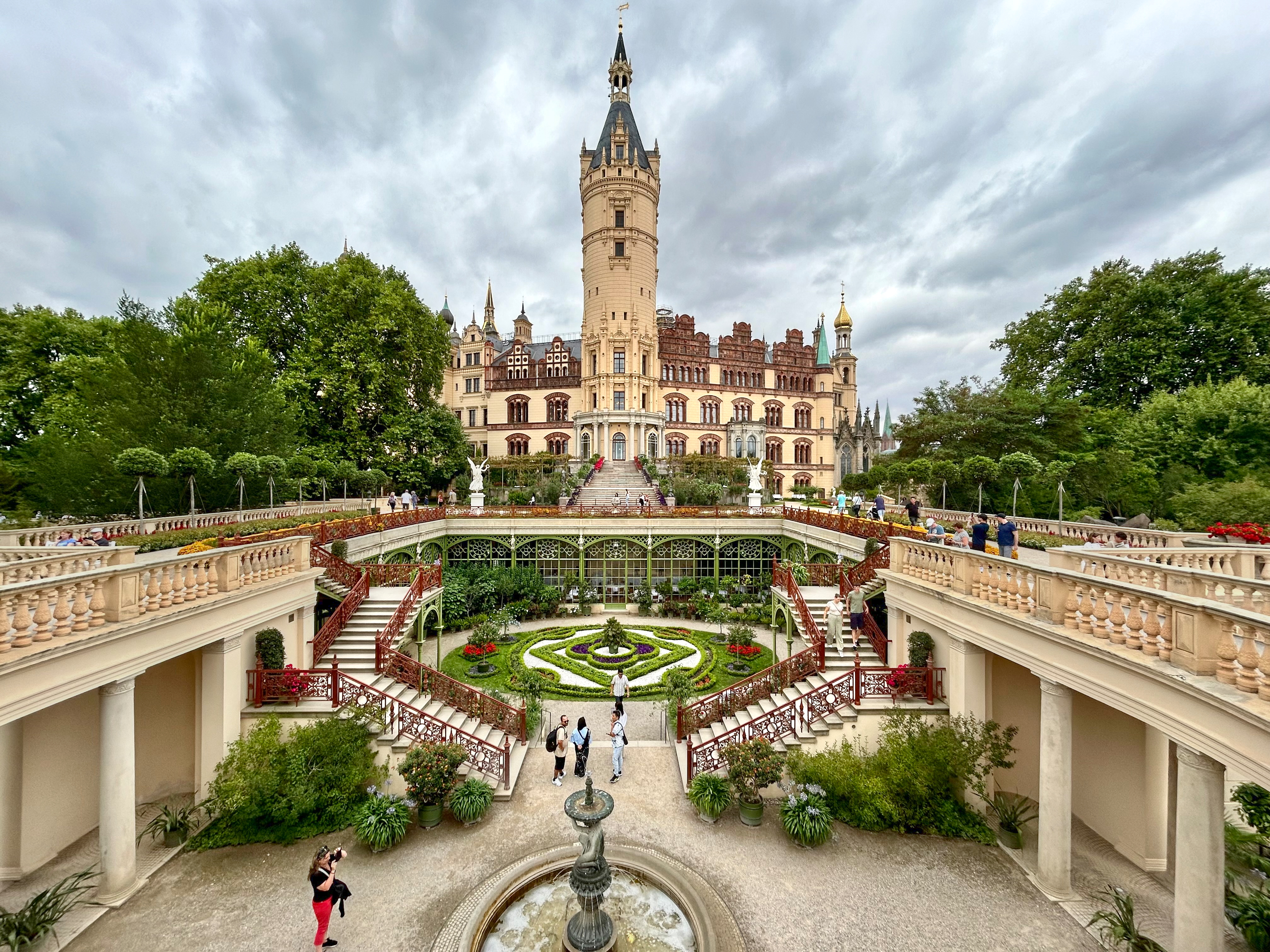
East view
