= 955 =

Calendar year

955 in various calendars
Gregorian calendar	955; CMLV
Ab urbe condita	1708
Armenian calendar	404; ԹՎ ՆԴ
Assyrian calendar	5705
Balinese saka calendar	876–877
Bengali calendar	361–362
Berber calendar	1905
Buddhist calendar	1499
Burmese calendar	317
Byzantine calendar	6463–6464
Chinese calendar	甲寅年 (Wood Tiger); 3652 or 3445 — to — 乙卯年 (Wood Rabbit); 3653 or 3446
Coptic calendar	671–672
Discordian calendar	2121
Ethiopian calendar	947–948
Hebrew calendar	4715–4716
- Hindu calendars
Vikram Samvat	1011–1012
Shaka Samvat	876–877
Kali Yuga	4055–4056
Holocene calendar	10955
Iranian calendar	333–334
Islamic calendar	343–344
Japanese calendar	Tenryaku 9 (天暦９年)
Javanese calendar	855–856
Julian calendar	955; CMLV
Korean calendar	3288
Minguo calendar	957 before ROC 民前957年
Nanakshahi calendar	−513
Seleucid era	1266/1267 AG
Thai solar calendar	1497–1498
Tibetan calendar	ཤིང་ཕོ་སྟག་ལོ་ (male Wood-Tiger); 1081 or 700 or −72 — to — ཤིང་མོ་ཡོས་ལོ་ (female Wood-Hare); 1082 or 701 or −71

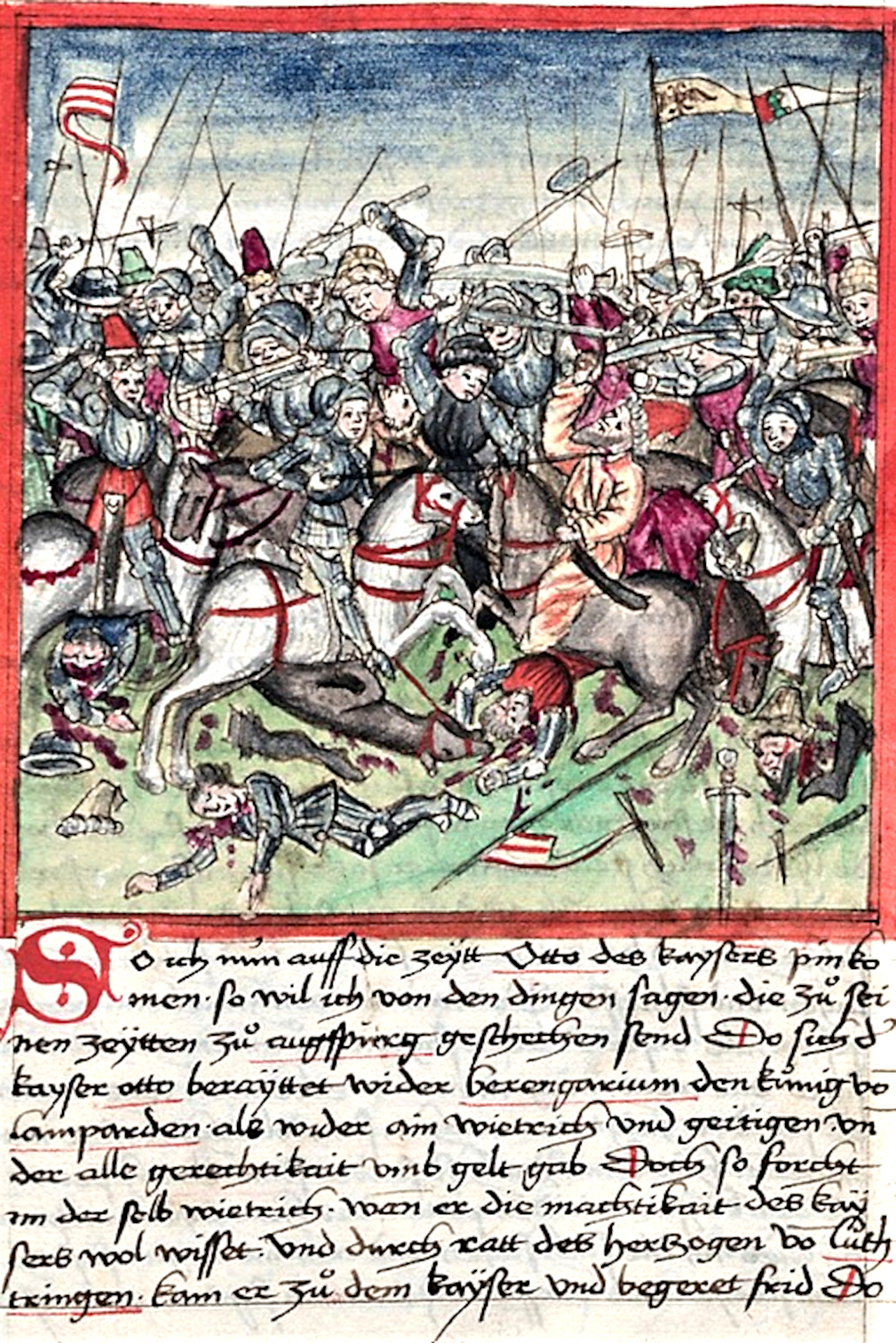
Battle of Lechfeld on an illustration of 1457.

Year 955 (CMLV) was a common year starting on Monday of the Julian calendar.

== Events ==
=== By place ===
==== Europe ====
- August 10 – Battle of Lechfeld: King Otto I ("the Great") defeats the Hungarians (also known as Magyars) near Augsburg (Germany). Otto's army (7,000 men), mainly composed of heavy cavalry, overwhelms the Hungarians along the Lech River. The German losses are heavy, among them Conrad ("the Red") and many other nobles. The commanders of the Hungarian army, Bulcsú, Lehel and Súr, are captured and executed. This victory puts an end to the Hungarian campaigns into western Europe.
- October 16 – Battle on the Raxa: Otto I, allied with the Rani tribe, defeats the Obotrite federation, led by Nako and his brother Stoigniew (probably at the Recknitz or Elde rivers) near Mecklenburg. The Elbe Slavs are forced to pay tribute, and accept a peace agreement.

==== England ====
- November 23 – King Eadred (or Edred) dies childless after a 9-year reign at Frome (Somerset). He is succeeded by his 15-year-old nephew, Eadwig, as King of England.

==== Africa ====
- The Kharijite Banu Ya'la tribe revolts against the Fatimid Caliphate in Ifriqiya and destroys the city of Oran (modern Algeria). They construct a new capital, Ifgan, near Mascara.

=== By topic ===
==== Religion ====
- November 8 – Pope Agapetus II dies after a 9-year reign. He is succeeded by John XII, aged around 19 and the son of Alberic II (the late ruler of Rome), as the 130th pope of the Catholic Church.

== Births ==
- May 10 – Al-Aziz Billah, caliph of the Fatimid Caliphate (d. 996)
- October 22 – Qian Weijun, king of Wuyue (Ten Kingdoms) (d. 991)
- November 9 – Gyeongjong of Goryeo, ruler of Korea (d. 981)
- Aboazar Lovesendes, Portuguese nobleman (approximate date)
- Ælfric of Eynsham, English abbot and writer (approximate date)
- Arduin of Ivrea (I), Lombard margrave and king of Italy (approximate date)
- Eido I (or Ägidius), German nobleman and bishop (d. 1015)
- Ezzo (or Ehrenfried), Count Palatine of Lotharingia (Germany) (approximate date)
- Gisela of Burgundy, duchess of Bavaria (approximate date)
- Gunther of Bohemia, German hermit and saint (d. 1045)
- Lutgardis of Luxemburg, countess of Holland (Netherlands)
- Matilda, Abbess of Quedlinburg, German princess-abbess and daughter of Otto I (d. 999)
- Otto II, Holy Roman Emperor ("the Red") (d. 983)
- Theophanu, empress consort of the Holy Roman Empire (d. 991)
- Kunhsaw Kyaunghpyu, king of the Pagan dynasty (d. 1048)

== Deaths ==
- July 23 – He Ning, Chinese official and chancellor (b. 898)
- August 10 – Conrad ("the Red"), duke of Lorraine
- August 15
  - Bulcsú, Hungarian tribal chieftain (harka)
  - Lehel, Hungarian tribal chieftain
  - Súr, Hungarian tribal chieftain
- October 16 – Stoigniew, Obotrite prince and co-ruler
- November 1 – Henry I, Duke of Bavaria
- November 8 – Pope Agapetus II, Catholic Church pontiff (b. 905)
- November 23 – Eadred (or Edred), king of England (b. 923)
- Abu 'Ali Chaghani, ruler of Chaghaniyan (Turkmenistan)
- Bermudo Núñez, count of Cea (Spain) (approximate date)
- Gamle Eirikssen, Norwegian Viking ruler (b. 910)
- Hervé I, count of Mortagne and Perche
- Muhammad ibn Shaddad, Shaddadid ruler
- Parantaka I, ruler of Chola Kingdom (India)
- Sultan Satuq Bughra Khan, Kara-Khanid ruler
