= Richard Otto Zöpffel =

German church historian and theologian (1843–1891)

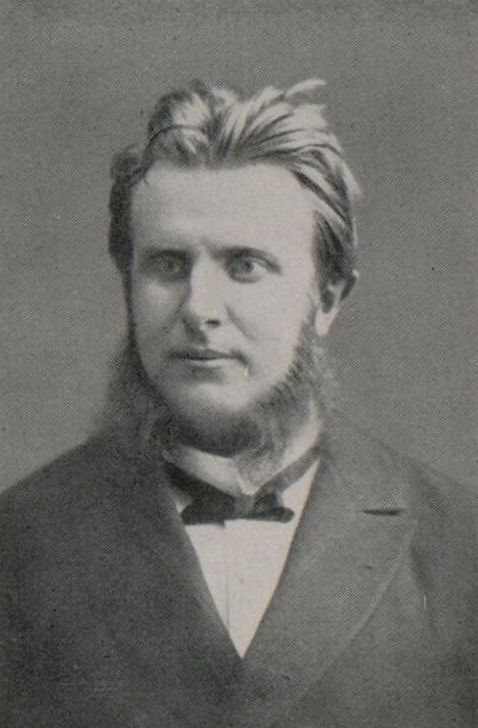

Richard Otto Zöpffel (14 June 1843 – 7 January 1891) was a Baltic German church historian and theologian born in Arensburg, Governorate of Livonia, Russian Empire (today Kuressaare, Estonia).

He studied theology at the University of Dorpat, and history at the University of Göttingen under Georg Waitz (1813-1886). In 1871 he published Die Papstwahlen und mit ihnen im nächsten Zusammenhange stehenden Ceremonien in ihrer Entwickelung vom 11. bis zum 14. Jahrhundert ("The papal elections ... in their development from the 11th to the 14th century"), and based on this work, received his doctorate in Göttingen. Shortly afterwards, he was appointed associate professor of church history at the University of Strasbourg, becoming a full professor in 1877. In 1887–88 he was rector of the university.

With Heinrich Julius Holtzmann (1832–1910), he wrote the influential Lexikon für Theologie und Kirchenwesen (Glossary of Theology and Church affairs; first edition, 1882), and contributed many articles to the Realencyklopädie of Herzog, Plitt, and Hauck.
