= Mstislavich =

East Slavic masculine patronymic

Mstislavich (Russian: Мстиславич) is either an archaic or a colloquial contracted feminine East Slavic patronymic derived from the given name Mstislav. The modern non-contracted patronymic is Mstislavovich. The corresponding feminine patronymic is Mstislavna. Notable persons with this patronymic include:

- Iziaslav II Mstislavich (c. 1096 – 1154), Grand Prince of Kiev (1146–1154), Prince of Pereyaslavl (1132; 1143–1145), etc.
- Mstislav Mstislavich, also called the Daring, the Bold or the Able (died c. 1228), was a prince of Tmutarakan and Chernigov
- Roman Mstislavich (c. 4 April 1152 – 19 June 1205), also known as Roman the Great, Prince of Novgorod (1168–1170), Volhynia (1170–1189; 1189–1205)
- Rostislav Mstislavich (c. 1110 – 1167), Prince of Smolensk (1125–1160), Novgorod (1154) and Grand Prince of Kiev (1154–1155; 1159–1161; 1161–1167)
- Vladimir III Mstislavich (1132–1171), prince of Dorogobuzh (1150–1154; 1170–1171), Vladimir and Volyn (1154–1157), Slutsk (1162), Trypillia (1162–1168)
- Vsevolod Mstislavich (disambiguation), multiple persons
