= Hermann Hupfeld =

German Orientalist and Biblical commentator

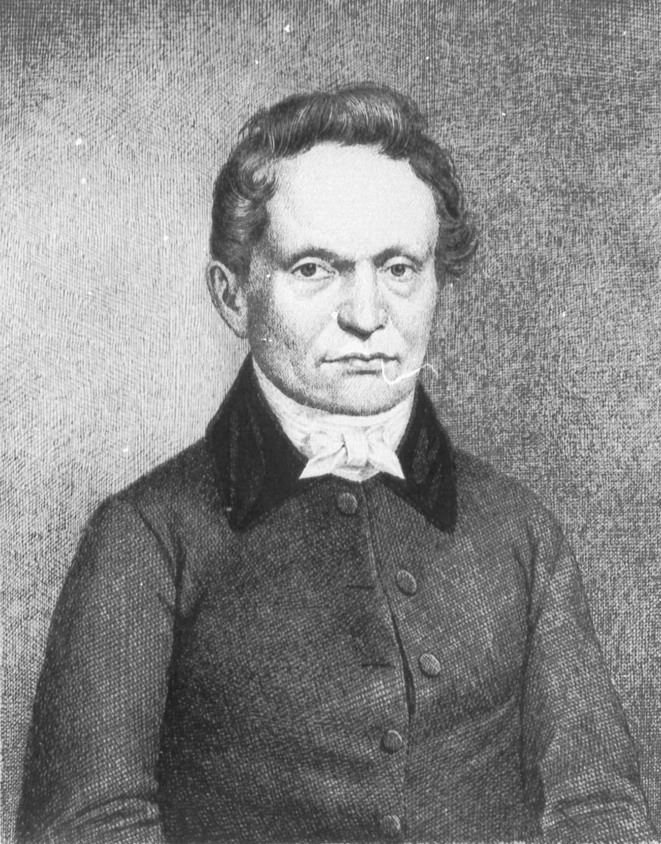
Hermann Hupfeld

Hermann Hupfeld (31 March 1796 – 24 April 1866) was a Protestant German Orientalist and Biblical commentator. He is known for his historical-critical studies of the Old Testament.

He was born at Marburg, where he studied philosophy and theology from 1813 to 1817. In 1819 he became a teacher in the gymnasium at Hanau, but in 1822 resigned that appointment. After studying for some time at Halle, he in 1824 settled as Privatdozent in philosophy at that university, and in the following year was appointed extraordinary professor of theology at Marburg. There he received professorships of theology and Oriental languages in 1825 and 1827 respectively. Sixteen years later he returned to Halle as a successor of Wilhelm Gesenius.

In 1865 he was accused by some theologians of the Hengstenberg school of heretical doctrines. From this charge, however, he successfully cleared himself, the entire theological faculty, including Julius Müller and August Tholuck, bearing testimony to his sufficient orthodoxy. He died at Halle on 24 April 1866.

His earliest works in the department of Semitic philology (Exercitationes Aethiopicae, 1825, and De emendanda ratione lexicographiae Semiticae, 1827) were followed by the first part (1841), mainly historical and critical, of an Ausführliche Hebräische Grammatik, which he did not live to complete, and by a treatise on the early history of Hebrew grammar among the Jews (De rei grammaticae apud Judaeos initiis antiquissimisque scriptoribus, Halle, 1846).

His principal contribution to Biblical literature, the exegetical and critical Die Psalmen. Übersetzt und ausgelegt, began to appear in 1855, and was completed in 1861 (2nd ed. by E. Riehm, 1867–1871, 3rd ed. 1888). Other writings are:

- Über Begriff und Methode der sogenannten biblischen Einleitung (Marburg, 1844)
- De primitiva et Vera festorum apud Hebraeos ratione (Halle, 1851–1864)
- Die Quellen der Genesis von neuem untersucht (Berlin, 1853)
- Die heutige theosophische oder mythologische Theologie und Schrifterklärung (1861).

The main, recent biography, which for the first time includes archival sources, of Hupfeld is

- Otto Kaiser: Zwischen Reaktion und Revolution: Hermann Hupfeld (1796–1866) – ein deutsches Professorenleben, Vandenhoeck & Ruprecht, Göttingen 2005.

For older works, see See E. Riehm, Hermann Hupfeld (Halle, 1867); W. Kay, Crisis Hupfeldiana (1865); and the article by A. Kamphausen in Band viii of Herzog-Hauck's Realencyklopädie (1900).

== See also ==
- Priestly source
- Documentary hypothesis
