= Mstislav =

Mstislav may refer to:

- Mstislav (given name), a Slavic origin given name
- Mstislav Rostropovich, a Russian cellist
- Mistislaw, a leader of the Obotrite Slavs in the region of modern Mecklenburg and Holstein in northern Germany
- an alternate spelling of Mstsislaw, a town in Mogilev Region, eastern Belarus
