= Nakonids =

The Nakonids were the leading noble family of the Slavic peoples of the Elbe River from ca. 960 until 1129. They were themselves of Obotrite origin and engineered the formation of a Slavic principality in the region. They became extinct in the male line in the early 12th century. Their capital was Mecklenburg Castle.

The Nakonids derive their name – a modern invention – from the earliest attestable ruler of the dynasty, Nako, who fought the expansionist tendencies of the German kingdom in the mid and late 10th century before being defeated and converted to Christianity. The Nakonid leaders alternated between being lapsed Christians (mali christiani) and ardent missionaries of the Slavs who were the prime movers of the Germanisation and Christianisation of the Polabian Slavs.

The German historian Heinz Stoob, in his retranslation of the chronicle of Helmold, derived the first genealogy of the Nakonids. Besides Helmold, Adam of Bremen, Thietmar of Merseburg, and Saxo Grammaticus are important sources for Nakonid history. Despite these sources, uncertainty exists concerning the nature of the Nakonid rule over their people. Historiographers sometimes call them Samtherrscher or Oberherrscher, meaning "overlords". The primary sources, in Latin, use the various titles regulus (subking), dux (duke), and tyrannus (tyrant or usurper) to describe them. When Canute Lavard was granted lordship over the Obotrites in 1128 by Emperor Lothair II, he took the Slavic title knes.

The Nakonids were originally the rulers of the Obotrites, but under Nako they obtained dominance over the neighbouring Slavs: the Wagrii with their capital at Starigard, the Polabians with their chief cities of Liubice and Ratzeburg, the Linonen with their capital at Lenzen, and the Warnabi. This Nakonid principality, the Obotrites Confederation as it is sometimes called, was composed of these and other smaller tribes each under its own chieftain, but with all recognising the overlordship of the Obotrites chief, perhaps because they served as a buffer (Limes Saxoniae) between the more powerful Saxons and the more easterly Slavs, and they also had older relations with the Franks to the west. The Obotrites had made a pact with Charlemagne as early as the Battle of the Sventanafeld in 798.

The Nakonids contested supremacy of the Slavs of the Elbe and Baltic coast with the Veleti to the east and the Polani to the south. The Polans under the Piasts drew many Slavs to their banner by offering a Christian alternative to Germany. The Nakonids probably turned to Christian Denmark to avoid the pressures of Saxon missionary work and the tithes and other taxes imposed by the Saxon Church. However, the other tribes each had their own favoured divinities (Prove in Wagria, Radegast in Mecklenburg, Swantewit in Rugia) and clung to them strongly when Christianity was foisted upon them. The opposing influences of Slavic paganism and Saxon Christianity is seen in that several Nakonids had both a Slavic name and a Saxon, Christian name.

Nako turned to Christianity after his defeat in the Battle of Recknitz in 955. He established his seat at Mecklenburg. His sons Mstivoj and Mstidrag and grandsons Mstislaw and Udo are mostly associated with the Slavic uprising of 983. All of them either abandoned Christianity or were "bad Christians" (at least for a time). Udo's successor, Gottschalk, is perhaps the most famous member of the family. He was educated by the Church, but initially made war on the Saxons in revenge for his father's death (1028). He was captured and his lands and position given to Ratibor. After a sojourn in Scandinavia and England, he returned to the Elbe region with a renewed sense of Christian purpose. He subdued the Veleti and the Diocese of Bremen is said to have "feared him as king." Had he not died in a pagan uprising, "he would have brought all pagans to the Christian faith." His son Henry subdued the Rani and encouraged the missionary work of Vicelinus. Henry had four sons, but two predeceased him and the two who survived fought over the inheritance, dying in 1128 and 1129.

== Sources ==
- Thompson, James Westfall (1928). Feudal Germany, Volume II. New York: Frederick Ungar Publishing.
- Gwatkin, H. M., Whitney, J. P. (ed) et al. The Cambridge Medieval History: Volume III. Cambridge University Press, 1926.
- Adam of Bremen, History of Hamburg's Bishops, short online text. English.
