= Mistislaw =

Elbe Slavic prince of the Nakonid family

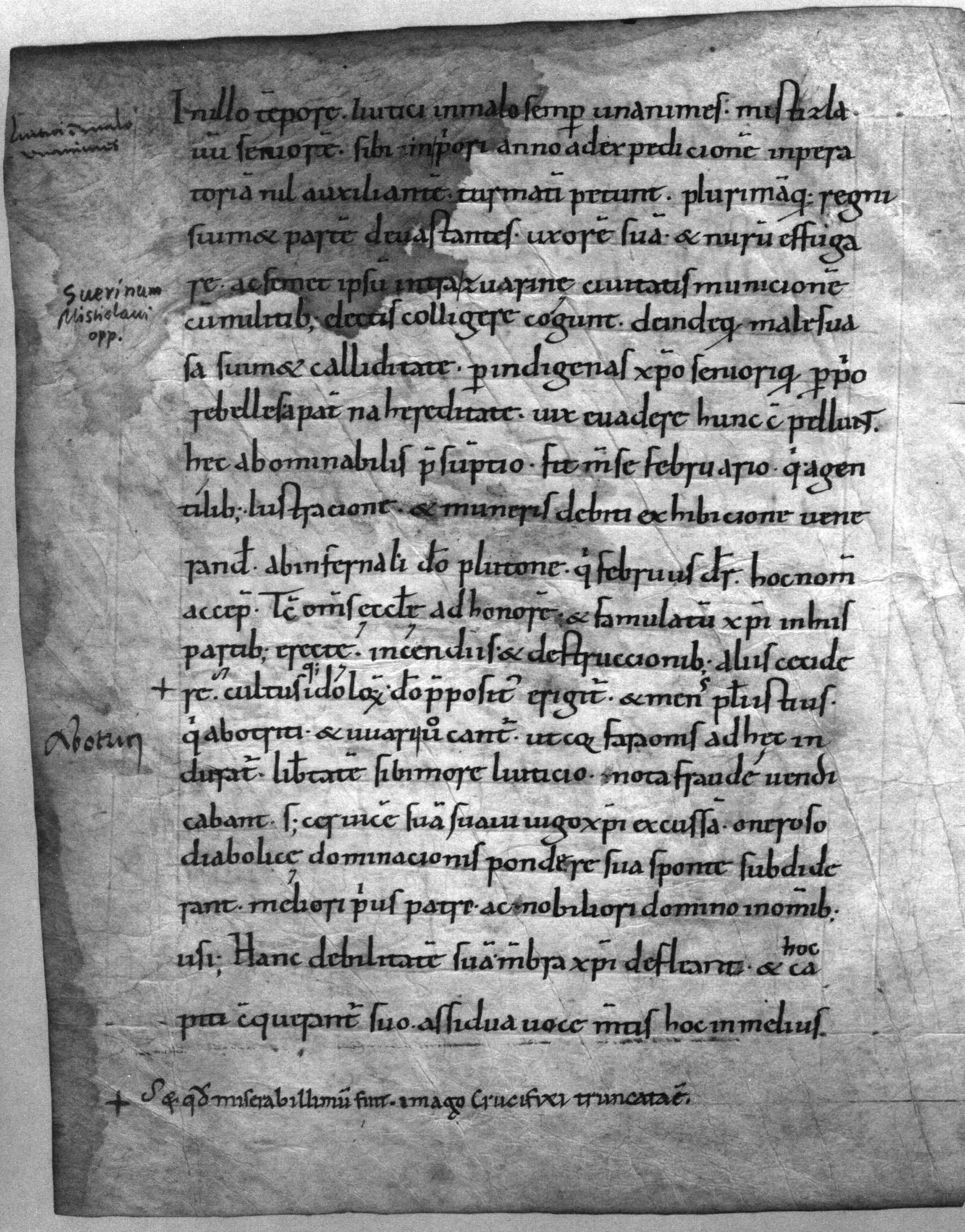
First mention of Mistislaw as Mistizlavus in the chronicle of Thietmar of Merseburg from ca. 1018 (facsimile). SLUB Dresden, Msc. R 147, sheet 178 b.

Mistislaw, also known as Mstislav (died after 1018), was an Elbe Slavic prince of the Nakonid lineage and ruled over the Obotrites in what is now Mecklenburg and eastern Holstein from 990/995 to 1018.

The Nakonids were among the most powerful Christian Slavic princes in the second half of the 10th century. In the retinue of the Saxon Duke Bernhard I, Mistislaw participated in Otto II's campaign against the Saracens in southern Italy in 982, from which he returned with only a few survivors. In the subsequent Slavic revolt of 983, the Nakonids relinquished their sovereignty over several Obotrite branches to the victorious Lutici. Upon the death of his father, Mstivoj, in 990 or 995, Mistislaw attempted to establish royal rule over the remaining peoples. While he managed to secure the support of the Church and the Empire, the opposition within the Obotrites joined forces with the Lutici. From 1003 onwards, Mistislaw's ability to secure Saxon support was eroded by Henry II's alliance with the Lutici against the Polish prince Boleslaw I. This ultimately resulted in Mistislaw's inability to assert his authority. In February 1018, the Lutici invaded the Obotrite kingdom, incited unrest among the population, and compelled Mistislaw to seek refuge in the Saxon Bardengau.

The majority of recent research views Mistislaw as a Christian Slavic prince with close ties to the Holy Roman Empire. This research suggests that his attempt to reorganise the Obotrite kingdom from a personal state to a territorial state failed, despite the support of the Church and the Saxon duchy.

== Life ==
=== Origin and family ===
Mistislaw, also known as Mistizlavus and Missizla in historical sources, was the son of the Obotritic sovereign (Samtherrscher), Mstivoj. He had two sisters, Tove and Hodica. A marriage to the niece of the Saxon Duke Bernhard I was unsuccessful in 983 due to the opposition of Dietrich of Haldensleben. Mistislaw had a son, Pribignew, with an unknown wife, who assumed control of the confederation around 1020 with the support of Danish and Saxon forces.

=== Campaign against the Saracens in southern Italy ===
Before assuming the role of ruler, Mistislaw participated in Emperor Otto II's Italian campaign in 982 as a representative of the Nakonid family. At the head of a delegation of Obotrite armoured horsemen, he crossed the Alps in 981/982 in the wake of the Saxon Duke Bernhard I to reinforce the imperial army in the southern part of the empire. At this juncture, the emperor initiated a military campaign against the Saracens, who had advanced from Sicily to the southern Italian mainland under the leadership of their emir Abu al-Qasim. The contingent led by Mistislaw is said to have consisted of 1,000 armoured horsemen. By medieval standards, this number is hardly believable, particularly when one considers that the emperor had only requested a total of 2090 armoured riders from the northern part of the empire in his call-up order. Nevertheless, the number of Obotrite warriors must have been exceptionally high, as Bernhard I promised the marriage of his niece to Mistislaw in return for their participation in the campaign, thus creating a dynastic connection between the two princely houses. While Bernhard I was compelled to return to the north at an early stage due to an invasion by the Danes, the vast majority of the Abodrites perished in Italy. Although their ultimate fate remains unknown, it seems likely that they participated in the Battle of Cape Colonna, in which the imperial army was decisively defeated on 15 July 982.

Mistislaw returned to Mecklenburg with the few survivors. Upon demanding the fulfilment of the marriage promise, Count Dietrich von Haldensleben refused to provide him with the bride, stating that a duke's blood relative should not be given to a dog. It seems probable that Dietrich's reasons for opposing a dynastic union between the Billungers and the Nakonids were power-political. As Margrave of the Nordmark, he competed with the Billungers and Nakonids for influence in the Circipanian territory, which was traditionally subject to Obotrite rule. Conversely, it seems unlikely that Dietrich's ethnic reservations about a marriage between the Slavic prince's son and the Saxon princess were a significant factor in his opposition to the union. Such unions were not uncommon at the time. In 978, Dietrich himself had sponsored the marriage of his eldest daughter Oda to the Polish prince Mieszko I, and his other daughter Mathilde had married the Hevelli prince Pribislaw. Mistislaw's father, Mstivoj, was married to the sister of the Oldenburg bishop, Wago, and a relative of the Saxon duke, Bernhard I, Weldrud, had been given in marriage to the Wagrian prince, Sederich.

=== Sovereignty ===
As the sovereign of the Obotrite confederation, Mistislaw ruled over the eponymous Obotrite branch on both sides of Lake Schwerin and the princes of the various branches. They owed him military allegiance and tribute.

==== Accession to power ====
The date of Mistislav's accession to power is uncertain. The majority of research has concentrated on the years 990 and 995. Christian Lübke has proposed that a significant shift in Obotrite policy could be identified from 990 onwards, which would indicate a change in leadership. In contrast, Peter Donat and Jürgen Petersohn propose that a friendly visit by King Otto III to Mecklenburg in September 995 could have taken place on the occasion of Mistislav's enthronement.

==== Exercise of power ====
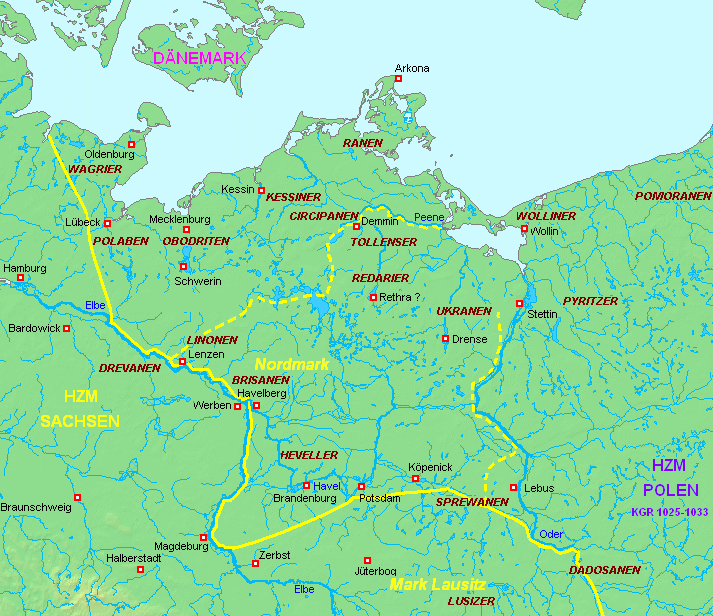
The Elbe Slavic peoples around the year 1000

As his father Mstiwoj had done before him, Mistislaw also used Mecklenburg Castle as a central seat of power and place of representation. This is evidenced by the official residence of the Oldenburg bishops Reginbert (991/992-1013/1014) and Bernard (1013/1014-1023), who resided at Mecklenburg Castle during Mistislaw's reign. Additionally, a nunnery was situated either on or close to Mecklenburg Castle. Following the Saxon model, this nunnery may have been established to provide accommodation for the daughters of the nobles of the Obotrite lands, to foster a sense of local loyalty among the noble families, binding them to location of the rulers seat. This is at odds with the account in Thietmar of Merseburg, which states that Mistislaw was imprisoned and besieged in Schwerin Castle in 1018. Nils Rühberg does not perceive any inconsistency in this account; rather, he suggests that Mistislaw had fled from Mecklenburg to Schwerin Castle.

The question of which of the Obotrite branches Mistislaw ruled over remains unresolved. It is assumed that he ruled over the Polabians to the west and the Kessinians to the east of Lake Schwerin, as well as the Linones to the south, who later emerged with their own tribal princes. The extent of his influence on the most significant branch besides the Obotrites, the Wagri in eastern Holstein, remains uncertain. The majority of scholars today assume that the ecclesiastical structures were permanently abolished in 990 and that Mistislaw still held at most a loose overlordship over the Wagrian prince Sederich. However, Thietmar of Merseburg expressly described him as the ruler of the Obotrites and Wagri in 1018. However, it is certain that the Circipania people along the Lower Peene were not under Mistislaw's rule. It is evident that the Circipanians had already allied themselves with the victorious Lutici, either concurrently or shortly after the Slavic uprising of 983.

Mistislaw sought to establish a form of autocracy within his territory, akin to that of a king. In Obotrite society, the ruler was not the sole bearer of political will. Rather, the lower nobility possessed a range of ancestral rights, including the independent administration of their castle districts and the installation and removal of the ruler. Mistislav's attempt to disempower the lesser nobility led to their opposition to him. The opposition nobles found allies in the pagan priesthood, whose influence Mistislaw sought to eliminate by expanding the Christian church organisation and the associated missionary work among the population. The veracity of reports by the Bosau priest Helmold in his Chronica Slavorum from around 1167 that Mistislaw had turned against the Christian church and dissolved the nunnery on Mecklenburg Castle is increasingly being questioned by researchers. This is particularly the case given that these reports contradict older reports that Bishop Bernhard's missionary endeavours among the Slavs were very successful and that Mistislaw remained a Christian until the end of his life.

==== Alliance policy ====
Mistislaw renewed his alliance with the Saxon Duke Bernhard I, to whom the Nakonids had been obliged to follow the army and pay tribute as vassals, at least under Mistislaw's father Mstivoj. King Otto III's friendly visit to Mecklenburg in the autumn of 995 was also an expression of cordial relations with the royal court, which had its roots in the common enmity with the Lutici. Consequently, no attacks by the Obotrites on Saxon territory are recorded during the tenure of Otto III as emperor (996-1002).

==== Downfall ====
The death of Emperor Otto III marked the beginning of Mistislaw's political decline. Initially, his allies, the Saxon Billungers, lost their royal proximity in the empire with the accession of Henry II. The primary cause of this was the conflict that erupted in Merseburg in the summer of 1002 between Henry II and the Polish ruler Bolesław I, with whom both the Nakonids and the Billungers were closely aligned. Subsequently, Henry II concluded an alliance with the pagan Lutici, Mistislaw's enemies, in Quedlinburg at Easter 1003. The altered political landscape resulted in a significant reduction in Saxon support for Mistislaw against the Liutizen and the inner-Abodrite opposition. The pagan priesthood and the lower nobility found a natural ally in the Lutici, whose constitution, without a monarchical leadership, was attractive to the nobles due to its "freedom in the manner of the Lutici". In February 1018, Mistislaw's position in the Obotrite kingdom became untenable. The accusation that Mistislaw had refused to join their army in the campaign against Boleslaw in autumn 1017 was used as a pretext for the Lutici to invade the Abodrite kingdom with an army, stir up the population and besiege Mistislaw in Schwerin Castle. From this point onwards, he and the princely family were able to flee to the Bardengau, probably to Lüneburg, the residence of the Saxon Duke Bernhard II. In the meantime, the rebels proceeded to destroy the Christian institutions in the Obotrite kingdom. Upon learning of the events in his diocese, Bishop Bernhard expressed his profound concern to Emperor Henry II, though he "sighed heavily, but postponed a decision until Easter in order to resolve the unfortunate web of conspiracy according to a well-considered plan". Nevertheless, the emperor refrained from intervening on behalf of the Church or reinstating Mistislav. In the year 1018, Mistislav died in exile in Saxony. No surviving memorial entries commemorate him.

== Availability of sources ==
The availability of historical sources is adverse, as there are no surviving written sources from the Obotrites. The existence and rule of Mistislaw are attested exclusively by Saxon reports, for the first time in 1018 in the chronicle of Thietmar of Merseburg, written between 1012 and 1018. In his Hamburg Church History, written around 1070, Adam of Bremen reports learning of a Slavic prince named Mistislaw, under whom peace had reigned in the territory of the Obotrites. However, chronologically, Adam places Mistislaw before his father Mstivoj and confuses the two when he has Mstivoj flee from an uprising in 1018. In Helmold of Bosau's Slavic Chronicle, Mistislaw, the son of an otherwise completely unknown Billug, ultimately becomes a "furious hater of Christians" who plots against his Christian stepmother until his father disowns her, raids and plunders Christian institutions and finally dissolves the convent on Mecklenburg Castle out of anti-Christian sentiment to marry the nuns to his warriors and his sister Hodica to a Boleslaw.

== Research history ==
Previous research on Mistislaw was primarily genealogical and church historical in nature. Confusion between Mistislaw and his father Mstivoj by Adam of Bremen and Helmold of Bosau led to ambiguities that hindered historians' attempts to establish a lineage of the Nakonids. Since Bernhard Schmeidler's investigation in 1918, Mistislaw's descent from Mstivoj has been generally recognised. As Helmold depicts Mistislaw as a vehement opponent of Christianity, in contrast to Adam, interest in ecclesiastical history was directed towards the question of whether Mistislaw actually adhered to the Christian faith until 1018. This question was finally answered by Albert Hauck.

In contrast, more recent research on the history of the Elbe Slavs has focused on the failed nation-building of the Obotrites and their relations with the neighbouring Saxons.

In 1960, Wolfgang H. Fritze, in his foundational work on the challenges of Obotritic tribal and kingdom governance, classified Mistislaw's rule during the partial tribal state as a form of authority over an association of individuals. Fritze's assessment has recently been contradicted by the archaeologist Fred Ruchhöft, who recognises the beginnings of nation-building under Mistislaw in particular. This involved a shift in Mistislaw's rulership from the "accumulation of a princely rule over several tribal princes" to a "territorial rule of followers". Previously, various historians had posited that Mistislaw had endeavoured to establish a royal-like rule based on territorial succession by eliminating the hereditary rights of the lower nobility.

The relationship between Mistislaw and the Saxon dukes and Otto III is also viewed differently by scholars. Mistislaw's flight to the Bardengau has consistently led historians to posit an alliance with the Saxon dukes. In order to consolidate his authority, he was compelled to consent to the permanent incorporation of the Obotrite settlement area as the Mark of the Billunger into an Ottonian system of marks. Mistislaw's role has been variously characterised as that of a governor and "tax collector" of the Billungers. This interpretation has been subject to criticism on several occasions, as it is incompatible with the otherwise strong and independent position of the Obotrite ruler. Finally, the reassessment of Otto III's visit to Mecklenburg in 995 as a friendly visit by the royal patron represents a departure from previous research findings. In contrast, Christian Lübke categorised Mistislaw as an enemy of the Saxons and the empire. During his tenure, the Obotrites devastated Northern Albingia, incinerated Hamburg, and destroyed the diocese of Oldenburg. This was followed by a series of military confrontations between the Obotrites and the Saxons, which culminated in the king's conquest of Mecklenburg in September 995 and the subjugation of Mistislaw.

== Sources ==
- Thietmar of Merseburg (1935). Holtzmann, Robert (ed.). Die Chronik des Bischofs Thietmar von Merseburg und ihre Korveier Überarbeitung. Thietmari Merseburgensis episcopi chronicon. Monumenta Germaniae Historica Scriptores. 6: Scriptores rerum Germanicarum (in German). Vol. 9. Berlin: Weidmann.
- Adam of Bremen (2000). "Gesta Hammaburgensis ecclesiae pontificum". In Buchner, Rudolf (ed.). Quellen des 9. und 11. Jahrhunderts zur Geschichte der Hamburgischen Kirche und des Reiches. Ausgewählte Quellen zur deutschen Geschichte des Mittelalters. Freiherr-vom-Stein-Gedächtnisausgabe (in German). Vol. 11 (6 ed.). Darmstadt: Wissenschaftliche Buchgesellschaft. pp. 137–499.
- Helmold of Bosau (1973). Helmoldi Presbyteri Bozoviensis Chronica Slavorum. Ausgewählte Quellen zur deutschen Geschichte des Mittelalters. Freiherr-vom-Stein-Gedächtnisausgabe. (in German). Vol. 19 (2 ed.). Darmstadt: Wissenschaftliche Buchgesellschaft.
