= Mstislavna =

East Slavic feminine patronymic

Mstislavna (Russian: Мстиславна) is either an archaic or a colloquial contracted feminine East Slavic patronymic derived from the given name Mstislav. The modern non-contracted patronymic is Mstislavovna. The corresponding masculine patronymic is Mstislavich. Notable persons with this patronymic include:

- Ingeborg Mstislavna of Kiev (fl. 1137), Ruthenian princess, married to the Danish prince Canute Lavard of Jutland
- Maria Mstislavna of Kiev (died 1179), Grand Princess consort of Kiev by marriage to Prince Vsevolod II of Kiev
- Rostislava Mstislavna, second wife of Yaroslav II, Grand Duke of Novgorod and Vladimir
