= Riehm =

Riehm is a surname. Notable people with the surname include:

- Eduard Karl August Riehm (1830–1888), German Protestant theologian
- Karl-Hans Riehm (born 1951), West German hammer thrower
- Rolf Riehm (1937–2026), German composer, oboist and academic teacher
