= Recknitz =

River in Germany

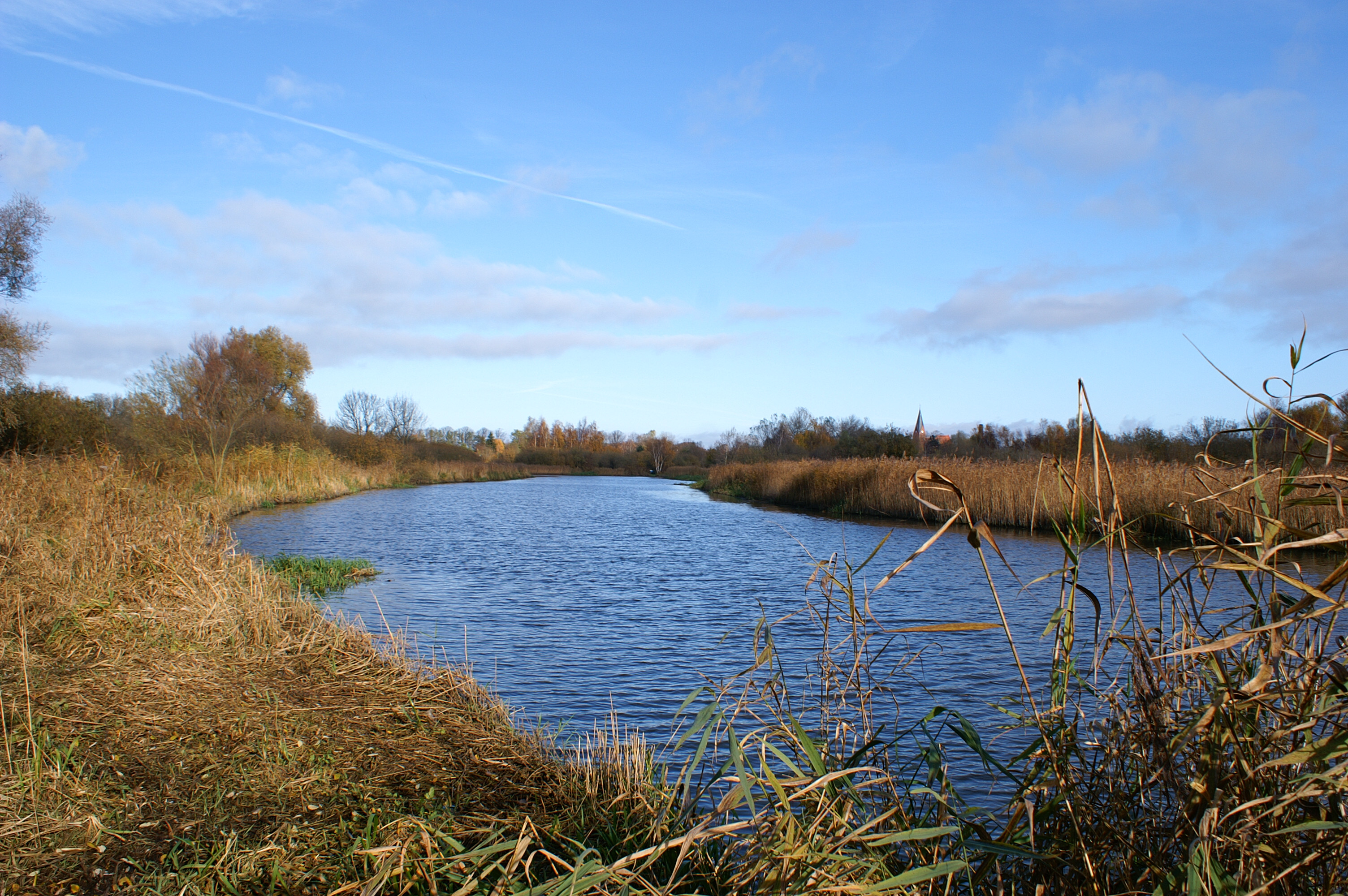
- Recknitz near Ribnitz-Damgarten

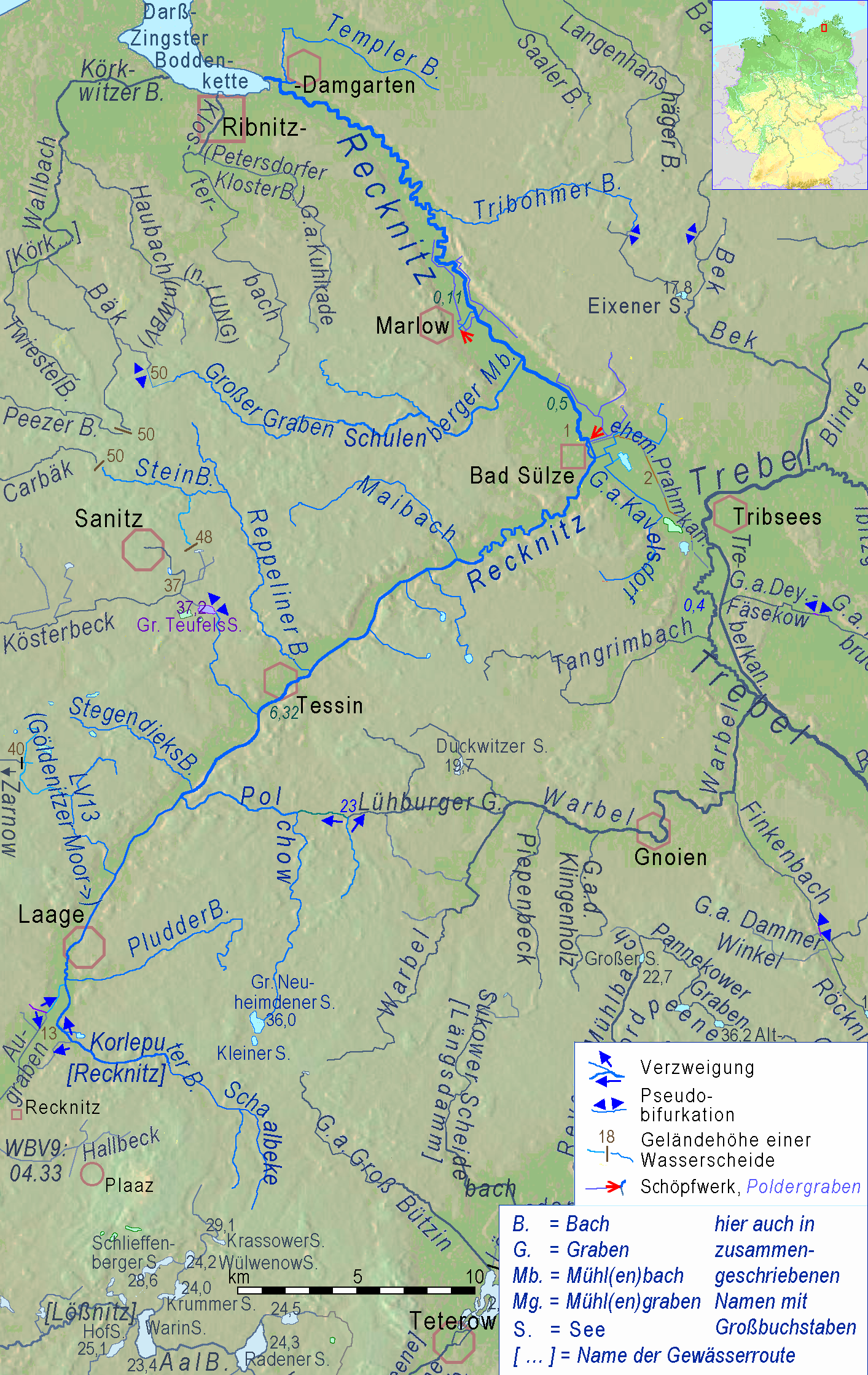
- Course and tributaries of Recknitz river

Location
- Country: Germany

Physical characteristics
- Source
  - location: Mecklenburg
- Mouth
  - location: Baltic Sea
  - coordinates: 54°15′7″N 12°27′23″E
- Length: 72 km (45 mi)
- Basin size: 669 km^{2} (258 sq mi)
- Discharge
  - average: 3.1 m^{3}/s (110 cu ft/s)

The Recknitz (German pronunciation: [ˈʁɛknɪts]; historically known as Raxa) is a river in Mecklenburg-Vorpommern in northeastern Germany. The Recknitz's glacial valley stretches as far south as the heights at Glasewitz near Güstrow. The river has no definite source, but rather builds up from streams and drainage ditches. The ditches of the Schaalbeke and Pludderbach have their water flow split between Liessow and Laage, but most of the water flows north as the Recknitz, while the lesser flow, called the Augraben, runs south to the river Nebel.

The lower Recknitz (from Ribnitz-Damgarten to Bad Sülze) is the historic boundary between Mecklenburg and Vorpommern. Nowadays, however, it is only a boundary between the Mecklenburg Regional Evangelical-Lutheran Church and the Pomeranian Evangelical Church.

Starting at Tessin, the Recknitz is navigable by canoe the year round. A number of measures have been undertaken along the river's course to restore the natural environment. Along one stretch of 30 km, three sections of riverside have been declared nature protection areas.

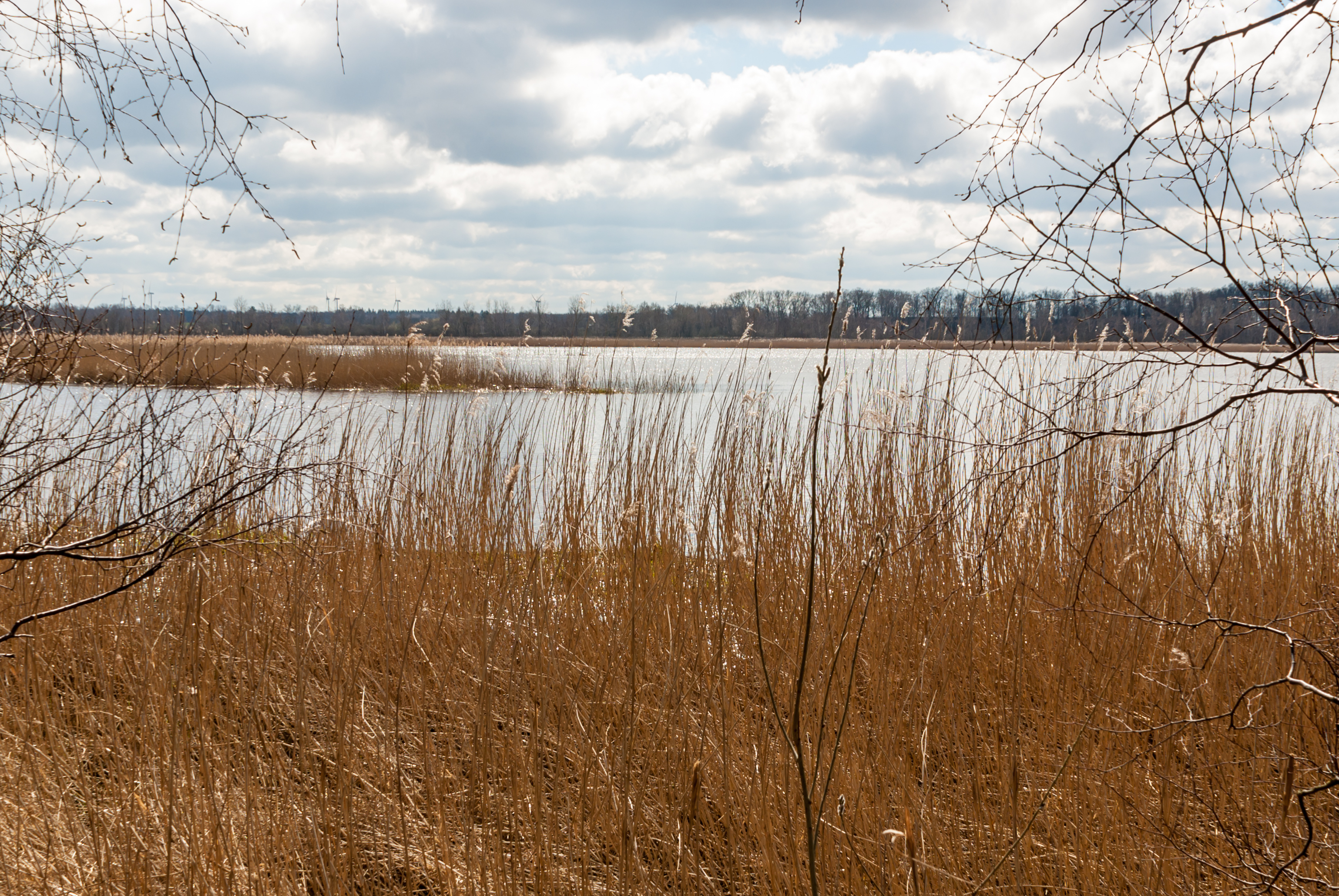
Mouth of the river Recknitz in Ribnitz-Damgarten

The Recknitz empties into the Saaler Bodden, the coastal waters of the Baltic Sea near Ribnitz-Damgarten.

In October 955 A.D. the vicinity of river was the site of famous Schlacht an der Raxa (Battle of Recknitz) between the German (Saxons and Frisians) army of Emperor Otto I of Germany commanded by Gero the Great and the Obodrite and other Polabian Slavs warriors army under prince Stoigniew, brother of prince Nakon.
