= Mściwój =

Mściwoj
- Gender: male

Origin
- Origin: Slavic
- Meaning: mści ("vengeance") + woj ("war, warrior")

Other names
- Nickname: Mszczuj
- Related names: Mścisław

Mściwój or Mściwoj is a Polish given name of Slavic origin, consists of two elements: mści "vengeance" and woj, derived from: wojna (war), wojownik (warrior) or wuj (uncle). A related name is: Mścisław. The Pomeranian form is Mestwin.

== List of people with the given name Mściwój ==
- Mestwin (Mściwoj) I, Duke of Pomerania
- Mestwin (Mściwoj) II, Duke of Pomerania
- Mszczuj of Skrzynno, Polish knight
