= Stoigniew =

Stoigniew (died 16 October 955) was an Obotrite leader, who reigned during the middle of the 10th century. He is mentioned as a member of the princely Nakonid dynasty in the medieval chronicles of Thietmar of Merseburg and Widukind of Corvey.

He was the co-ruler of the Obotrites, and, according to Thietmar's Chronicle written in 1012/1018, the brother of Prince Nakon. Widukind, in his Res gestae Saxonicae about 70 years earlier, mentioned a princeps barbarorum as Nakon's brother, though without giving his name. Both ruled over large territories of the Polabian Slavs, roughly corresponding to present-day Mecklenburg and the adjacent parts of Holstein up to the Elbe river. Another interpretation denotes Stoigniew as an autonomous ruler in the Circipania territory.

An entry in the Annales Sangallenses maiores report that in October 955, Stoigniew led the united Slavic forces of Obotrite, Veleti, Circipani, and Tollensians into the Battle on the Raxa against the East Frankish (German) king Otto I. Previous negotiations with the Saxon margrave Gero had failed. The Obotrites were defeated and Stoigniew was beheaded by one of Otto's knights.

== Annotations ==
- Name: also spelled Stojgniew, Stojgnev, Stoinef, Stoiniew, Stoinneg, Ztoignav.
