= Sønder Vissing Runestone =

Runestone in Jutland, Denmark

Coordinates: 56°1′23.41″N 9°38′31.66″E

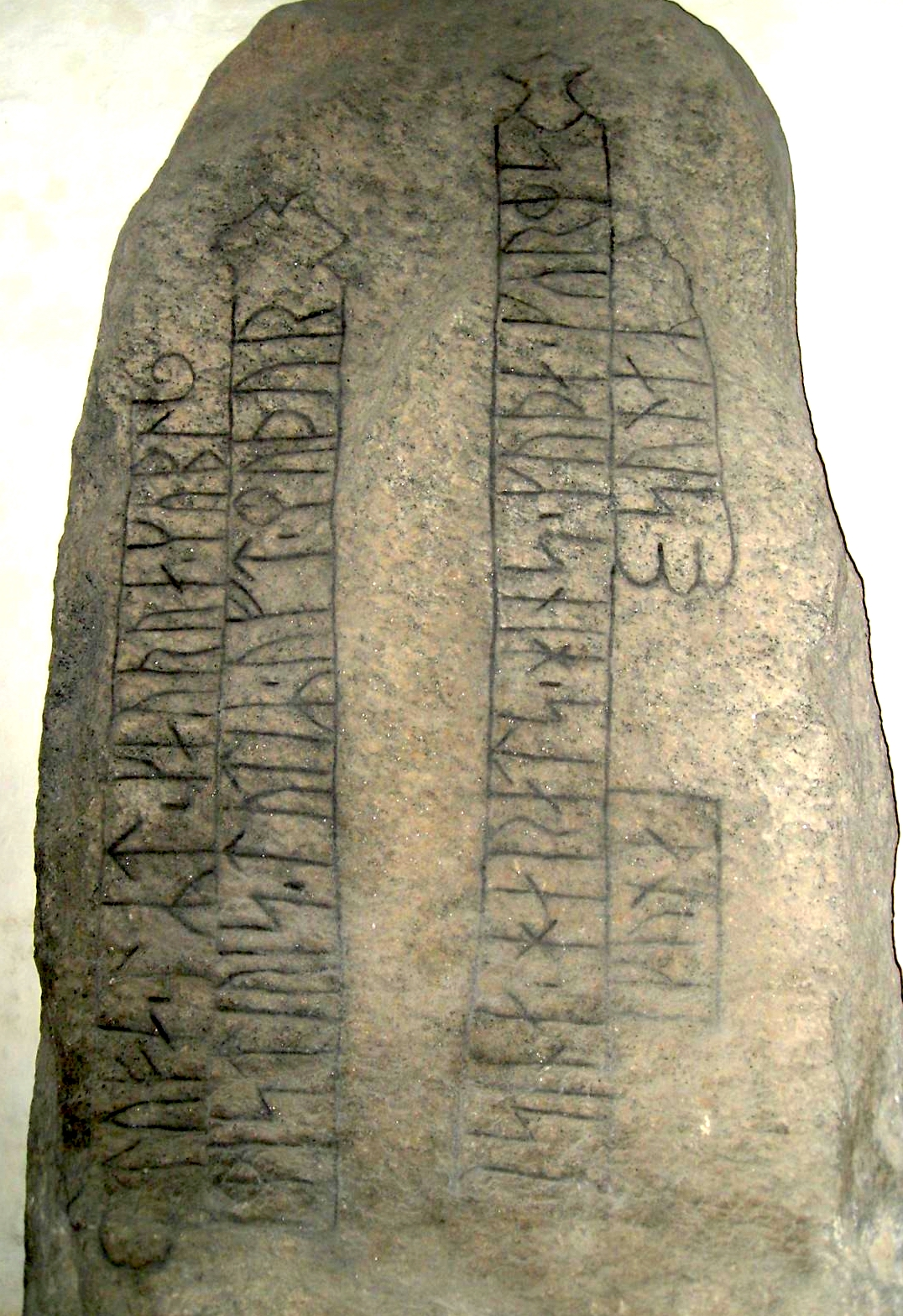
- Created: 10th century
- Discovered: Horsens, Jutland, Denmark
- Rundata ID: DR 55
- Runemaster: Unknown

Text – Native
- Old Norse: Tofa let gørwa kumbl, Mistiwis dottiʀ, æft moþur sina, kona Haralds hins Goþa, Gorms sonaʀ.

Translation
- Tófa, Mistivir's daughter, wife of Haraldr the good, Gormr's son, had the monument made in memory of her mother.

Sønder Vissing I or DR 55 is a runestone located in the church of Sønder Vissing in eastern Jutland, Denmark. Sønder Vissing is a small settlement located in Horsens municipality approximately 20 kilometres (12 mi) south of Silkeborg, 20 kilometres (12 mi) west of Skanderborg and 40 kilometres (25 mi) northeast of the Viking monuments of Jelling.

== Description ==
Sønder Vissing I was discovered in 1836 as part of the stone fence around the church cemetery. and became the object of a study by P. G. Thorsen published as Den Søndervissingske Runesten in 1839. It dates from the second half of the 10th century and was raised by one of Harald Bluetooth's wives Tofa after her mother. Tofa was the daughter of Mstivoj, a king of the Obodrites, and the stone is one of few runestones raised after a woman.

Danmarks Runeindskrifter considers the identification of the inscription's "Harald the Good" with Viking king "Harald Bluetooth" likely although this form of the name is not known from other sources. The actual inscription is possibly influenced by Swedish practice since the second word uses the rune "ʀ" to represent either "e" or "æ", a practice also seen on the Hobro II runestone. The connection with the Jelling stones is supported by the inscription's inclusion of a frame.

tufa ' lʀt ' kaurua ' kubl ¶ mistiuis ' tutiʀ ' uft ' muþur ¶ sina ' ¶ kuna ¶ harats ' hins ' kuþa ' kurms ¶ sunaʀ
Tofa {} let {} gørwa {} kumbl, {} Mistiwis {} dottiʀ, {} æft {} moþur {} sina, {} {} kona {} Haralds {} hins {} Goþa, {} Gorms {} sonaʀ.
Tófa, Mistivir's daughter, wife of Haraldr the good, Gormr's son, had the monument made in memory of her mother.

== Sønder Vissing II ==
A second runestone, Sønder Vissing II or DR 56, was discovered as part of the pavement of the entrance to the church cemetery, also in 1836. This exposed location — near the site of the first stone — is the reason why Sønder Vissing II's inscription is more damaged than the inscription of Sønder Vissing I.

Both stones were moved following their discovery. Sønder Vissing I was moved into the church by 1838 and has since 1897 been located next to the church organ. Sønder Vissing II was moved to the church cemetery in 1838 and has since 1897 been in the church porch.

tuki ' karþi ' kumbl ' þisi ' iaft ¶ aba ' faþur ' sin ¶ uhimskąn ' hal
Toki {} gærþi {} kumbl {} þæssi {} æft {} Apa/Æbba, {} faþur {} sin, {} uhemskan {} hal.
Tóki made this monument in memory of Api/Ebbi, his father, a wise hero.

== See also ==
- List of runestones

== Sources ==
- Peterson, Lena; Elmevik, Lennart; Williams, Henrik, eds. (2008-12-03). Scandinavian Runic-text Database (2008 ed.). Department of Scandinavian Languages, Uppsala University.
- A Norwegian site on runestones.
