= Mstivoj =

Obodrite prince

Mstivoj (c. 925 – 995) was an Obodrite prince (princeps Winulorum) from 965 or 967 until his death. He inherited his position along with his brother Mstidrag from their father Nako in an unknown year.

== Name ==
Mstiwoj is an old Slavic name popular among West Slavs and East Slavs, cognate with the Slavic word for “vengeance” (Polish: mścić, Czech: mstít, Ukrainian: mstiti), while “woj” or “wój” means “warrior”.

Thus the name has meaning "Avenger of warriors" or "Avenger warrior". Another forms of the name are: Mistivir, Mistiuis, Mistui, Mistuwoi, Mistiwoi, Mystiwoi, Mistivoj, Mstivoj and Polish Mściwój. The Christian name of Mstivoj was Billung - baptised after his probable godfather Hermann Billung.

== Biography ==
In 983, the brothers were leaders of the great Slavic revolt, which German historiography labels the Slawenaufstand, which followed news of the Emperor Otto II's defeat at the Battle of Stilo. He raided far to the west and even destroyed the relatively new city of Hamburg that year. There are two accounts of his life and his reasons for abandoning Christianity.

According to Adam of Bremen:

A Slavic prince named Billung married the beautiful sister of Bishop Wago of Starigard and had with her a daughter Hodica and a son Mstislaw, whom he, taking advantage of his jealousy of the Saxons, goaded into hatred of Christianity and his mother until, having so offended his wife, he began to connive against Christianity and the bishops.

According to Helmold:

Duke Herman Billung [actually Duke Bernard I] promised a niece of his to Mstivoj [or Mstivoj requested] if he accompanied him on campaign to Italy. That Mstivoj did and upon returning reminded him of the promise. Then Dietrich of Haldensleben proclaimed that "the high-born niece of a great prince may not be given to a dog," whereupon Mstivoj, recruiting the Liutizi to aid him, devastated Nordalbingia with fire and sword.

Helmold also justifies the Slavic rebellion repeatedly by citing the excessive greed of the Saxons.

Mstivoj's daughter Tove married in the spring of 962 Knut Danaást, the eldest son of Gorm the Old of Denmark. With the death of Knut in October 962 Tove became a widow, and instead she married Knut's younger brother Harald. It is not known whether she had any children or not, though some speculation has surrounded her as Sveyn Forkbeard's mother. Tove also raised the Sønder Vissing Runestone in memory of her mother. Another daughter, Hodica, was abbess of the monastery at the Mecklenburg. Mstivoj also had a son, Mstislaw, often being confused with his similarly named father.

== Sources ==
- Jacobsen, Lis. "Kong Haralds og Kong Gorms Jellingmonumenter." Scandia, IV. Lund, 1931. p. 264.
