= John Henry Augustus Bomberger =

German Reformed clergyman (1817–1890)

- Born: January 13, 1817; Lancaster
- Died: August 19, 1890; Collegeville
- Education: Franklin & Marshall College
- Occupation: Cleric
- Employer: Ursinus College

John Henry Augustus Bomberger (January 13, 1817, in Lancaster, Pennsylvania – August 19, 1890, in Collegeville, Pennsylvania) was a German Reformed clergyman. He was president of Ursinus College, and did a translation and condensation of the Schaff–Herzog Encyclopedia of Religious Knowledge.

== Biography ==
He graduated from Marshall College in 1837 and from Mercersburg Seminary in 1838, in which year he became a minister of the German Reformed Church. He was a pastor at Waynesboro, Pennsylvania, from 1840 to 1845; at Easton, Pennsylvania, from 1845 to 1854; and at the 1st Reformed Church (also known as the “Old Race Street Church”) of Philadelphia from 1854 to 1870. During the American Civil War, he was a radical abolitionist, and a firm supporter of the Union cause. In 1870, he became first president of Ursinus College, at Collegeville, Pennsylvania, which he had helped found.

== Literary endeavors ==
He started a condensed translation of Herzog's Protestant Theological and Ecclesiastical Encyclopaedia, of which two volumes appeared (Philadelphia, 1856–58), corresponding to the first six volumes of Herzog's work. Bomberger's work also incorporated information from other sources besides Herzog. He also published Five Years at Race Street Church (1859), Kurtz's Text-Book of Church History (2 vols., 1860–62), The Revised Liturgy (1866) and Reformed not Ritualistic (1867). He founded and edited the Reformed Church Monthly (1868-1876).
