= Gustav Leopold Plitt =

German Protestant theologian

Gustav Leopold Plitt (27 March 1836, Genin, near Lübeck – 10 September 1880, Erlangen) was a German Protestant theologian.

From 1854 to 1858, he studied theology at the Universities of Erlangen and Berlin. At Erlangen he was influenced by the work of Johann Christian Konrad von Hofmann. In January 1862, he became a privat-docent of theology at Erlangen, where he later became an associate professor (1867) and a full professor of theology (1876).

Beginning in 1877, he assisted Johann Jakob Herzog with a new edition of "Realenzyklopädie für protestantische Theologie und Kirche" (Edition 2: 18 volumes, 1877–1888). Upon Plitt's death in 1880, edition and publication of the encyclopedia was continued by Herzog and church historian Albert Hauck.

== Written works ==
Plitt's main work, an introduction to the Augsburg Confession ("Einleitung in die Augustana"), was published in two parts:

- First half: Geschichte der evangelischen Kirche bis zum Augsburger Reichstage, 1867 – History of the Protestant Church up until the Augsburg Reichstag.
- Second half: Enstehungsgeschichte des evangelischen Lehrbegriffs bis zum Augsburger Bekenntnisse, 1868 – Original history of the evangelical teaching concept of the Augsburg Confession.

Other noted works by Plitt include:

- Luther vor Kaiser und Reich, (A lecture held in December 1868.) Andreas Deichert, Erlangen 1869 – Martin Luther before the Emperor and Empire.
- Kurze Geschichte der lutherischen Mission in Vorträgen. Andreas Deichert, Erlangen 1871 – A brief history of the Lutheran mission in lectures.
- Die Apologie der Augustana geschichtlich erklärt, Andreas Deichert, Erlangen 1873 – The Apology of the Augsburg Confession.
- Jodokus Trutfetter von Eisenach der Lehrer Luthers in seinem Wirken geschildert. Andreas Deichert, Erlangen 1876 – Jodokus Trutfetter of Eisenach, etc.
