= Eduard Karl August Riehm =

19th-century German theologian

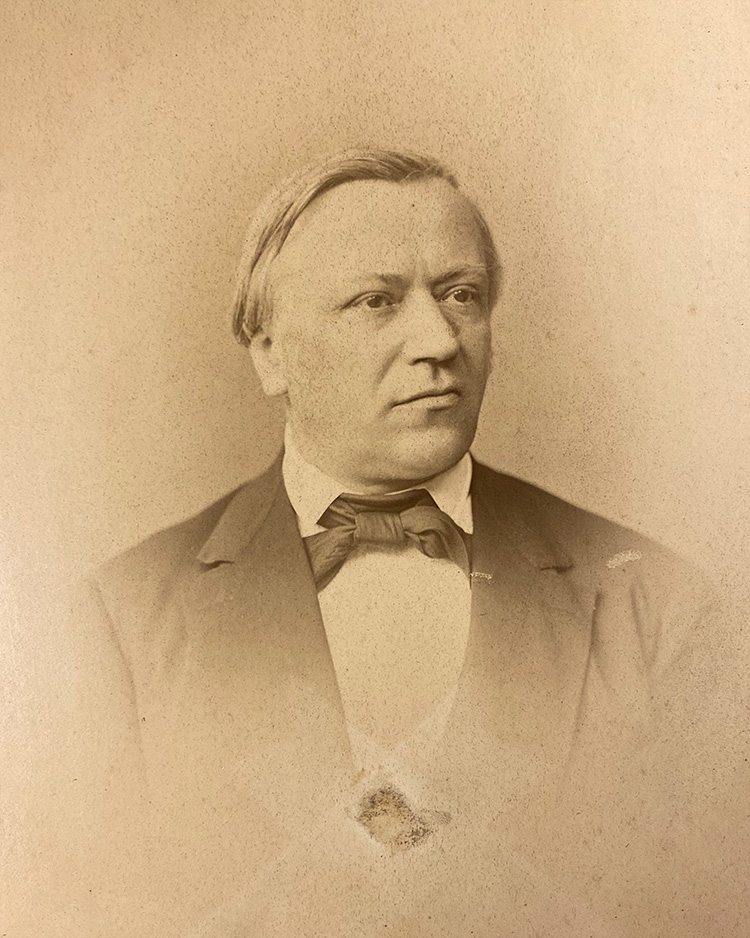
Eduard Riehm

Eduard Karl August Riehm (20 December 1830 – 5 April 1888) was a German Protestant theologian.

== Career ==
Riehm was born at Diersburg in Baden. He studied theology and philology at Heidelberg and later at Halle under Hermann Hupfeld, who persuaded him to include Arabic, Syriac and Egyptian. Entering the ministry in 1853, he was made vicar at Durlach soon afterwards, and became a licentiate in the theological faculty at Heidelberg. In 1854 he was appointed garrison-preacher at Mannheim for the Evangelical Church in Baden; and in 1858 he was licensed to lecture at Heidelberg, where in 1861 he was made professor extraordinarius. In 1862 he obtained a similar post at Halle, and in 1866 was promoted to the rank of professor ordinarius. As of 1878 he was a member of provincial synod of the Ecclesiastical Province of Saxony within the Evangelical Church of Prussia's older Provinces, advancing to member of the provincial synodal board in 1885, and becoming a member of the old-Prussian general synod too.

Throughout his life he followed Hupfeld's plan in his scientific treatment of the Old Testament, aiming to reconcile the results of a free criticism with a belief in divine revelation. His practical experience of pastoral work also proved of service to him when he became a professor of theology, for if there is one quality more striking than another in the writings of Riehm, it is that of sympathy with orthodox believers (TK Cheyne). In 1865 Riehm was made a member of the commission for the revision of Luther's translation of the Bible, and became one of the editors of the quarterly review, Theologische Studien und Kritiken.

== Publications ==
His works include:

- Die Gesetzgebung Moses im Lande Moab (1854), in which the Deuteronomic law book is assigned to the second half of the reign of Manasseh
- Lehrbegriff des Hebräerbriefes (1858–59, 2nd ed. 1867)
- Hermann Hupfeld, Lebens-und Charakterbild des deutschen Professors (1867)
- Die Messianische Weissagung (1875, 2nd ed. 1883; Eng. trans. 1890)
- Religion und Wissenschaft (1881)
- Handwörterbuchs des biblischen Altertums für gebildete Bibelleser (2 vols., 1884; 2nd. ed. revised by F. Baethgen, 1892–94)

After his death, his Einleitung in das Alte Testament (1889, ed. by A Brandt) was published, in which the date of the Deuteronomic law book was placed earlier than in his book on the legislation of Moses, shortly before or at the beginning of the reign of Hezekiah. His Alttestamentliche Theologie (1889, ed. by Pahncke) was also published posthumously. See Herzog-Hauck, Realencyklopädie, and TK Cheyne, Founders of Old Testament Criticism.
