= Vsevolod Mstislavich =

Vsevolod Mstislavich may refer to:

- Vsevolod Mstislavich of Volhynia, Rurikid, knyaz of Belz (1170–96), knyaz of Volodymyr (1188)
- Vsevolod Mstislavich of Novgorod and Pskov Rurikid, knyaz of Novgorod (1117–36), of Vyshgorod (1136), of Pskov (1137–38)
- Vsevolod Mstislavich of Smolensk (died 1249), also of Pskov (1213) and of Novgorod (1218-1221)
