= Tove of the Obotrites =

10th-century Queen of Denmark

Queen consort of Denmark
- Tenure: 963 – ?
- Born: 10th-century
- Spouse: Harald Bluetooth
- House: House of Denmark (by marriage)
- Father: Prince Mistivir of the Obotrites

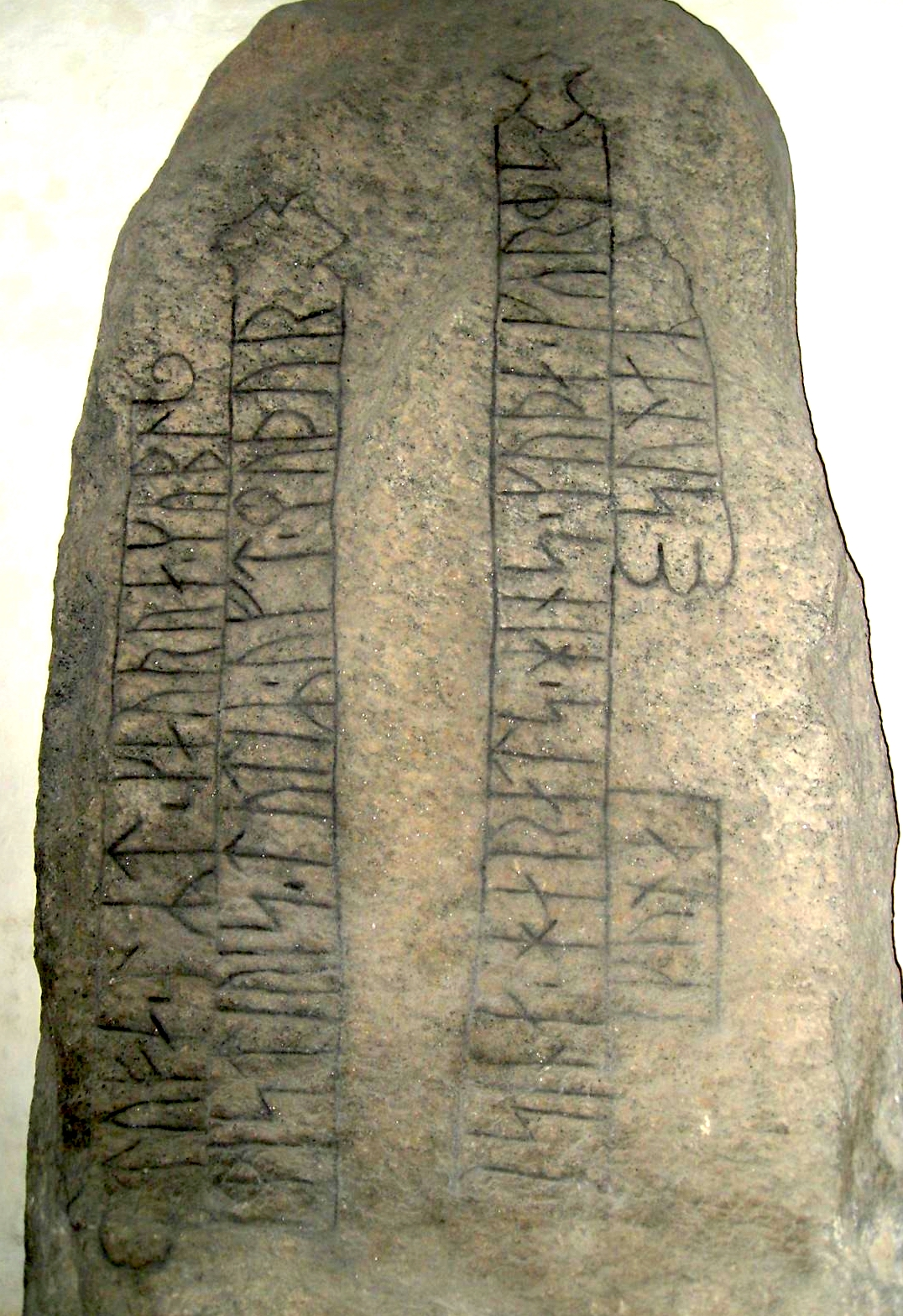
Sønder Vissing Runestone, raised by Tove in memory of her mother.

Tove of the Obotrites, also called Tova, Tofa or Thora, (10th century) was a Slavic princess and a Danish Viking Age queen consort, the spouse of King Harald Bluetooth.

Tofa, her name carved in runes as ᛏᚢᚠᛅ, was the daughter of Prince Mistivir of the Obotrites, a region also known as Wendland. She married King Harald in January 963. It is not known whether she had any children or not, though some speculation has surrounded her as Sveyn Forkbeard's mother. She had the Sønder Vissing Runestone carved in memory of her mother.

In 1772, the Danish historian Jakob Langebek recorded the wife of Harald Bluetooth under the name Thora in a translation of a runic chronicle of Danish kings.

Tove of the Obotrites Born: 10th century
Preceded by Thyra (Thorvi)	Queen consort of Denmark; 963 - ?	Succeeded by ? Gyrid Olafsdottir ?
