= Schaff–Herzog Encyclopedia of Religious Knowledge =

Christianity encyclopedia, from a primarily Protestant view (1882–1914)

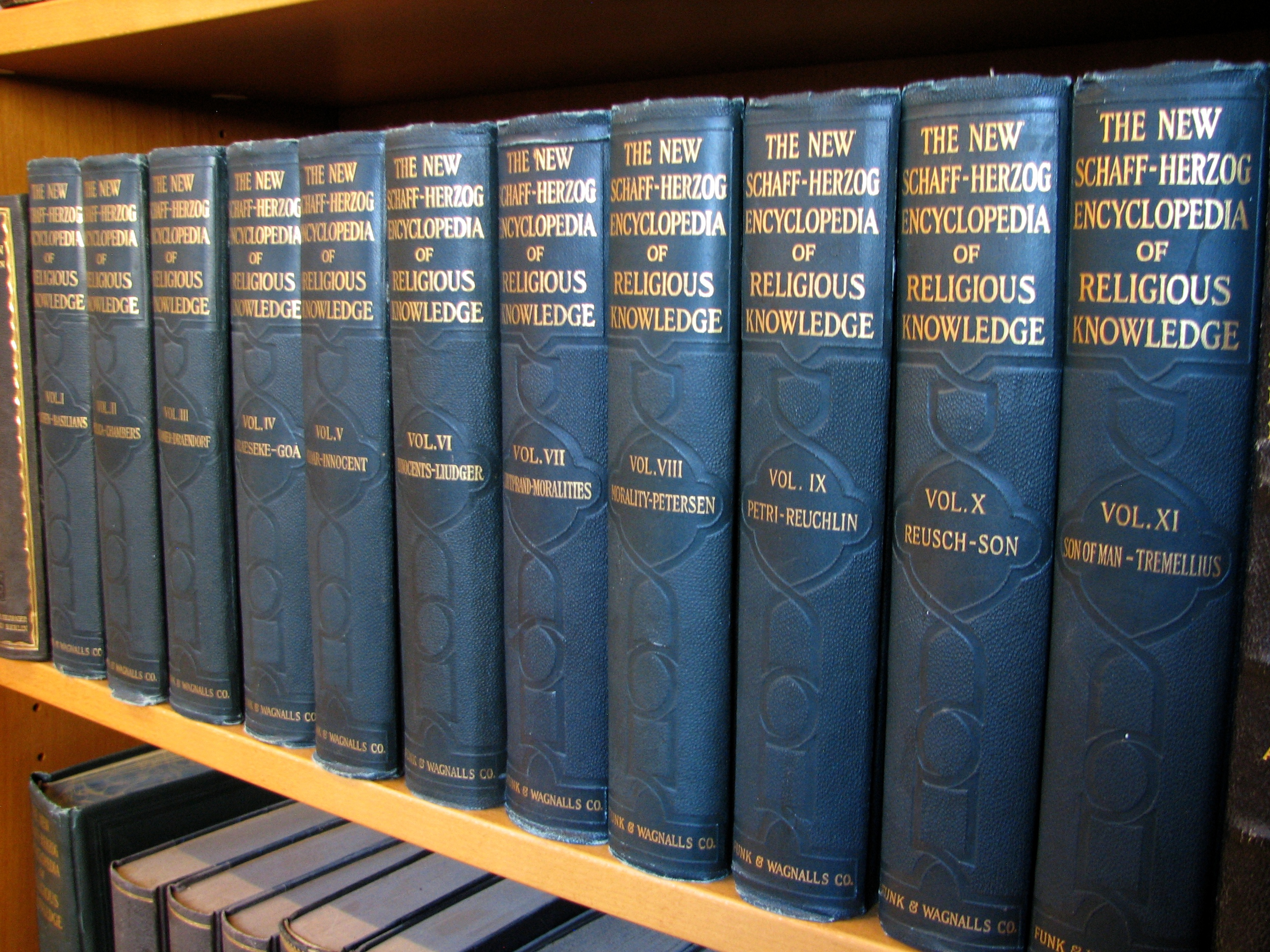
A set of The New Schaff-Herzog Encyclopedia of Religious Knowledge.

The Schaff–Herzog Encyclopedia of Religious Knowledge is a religious encyclopedia. It is based on an earlier German encyclopedia, the Realencyklopädie für protestantische Theologie und Kirche. Like the Realencyklopädie, it focuses on Christianity from a primarily Protestant point of view. The final edition, titled The New Schaff–Herzog Encyclopedia of Religious Knowledge, was published 1908–14 in 13 volumes, based on the third edition of the Realencyklopädie (1896–1909).

== Publishing history ==
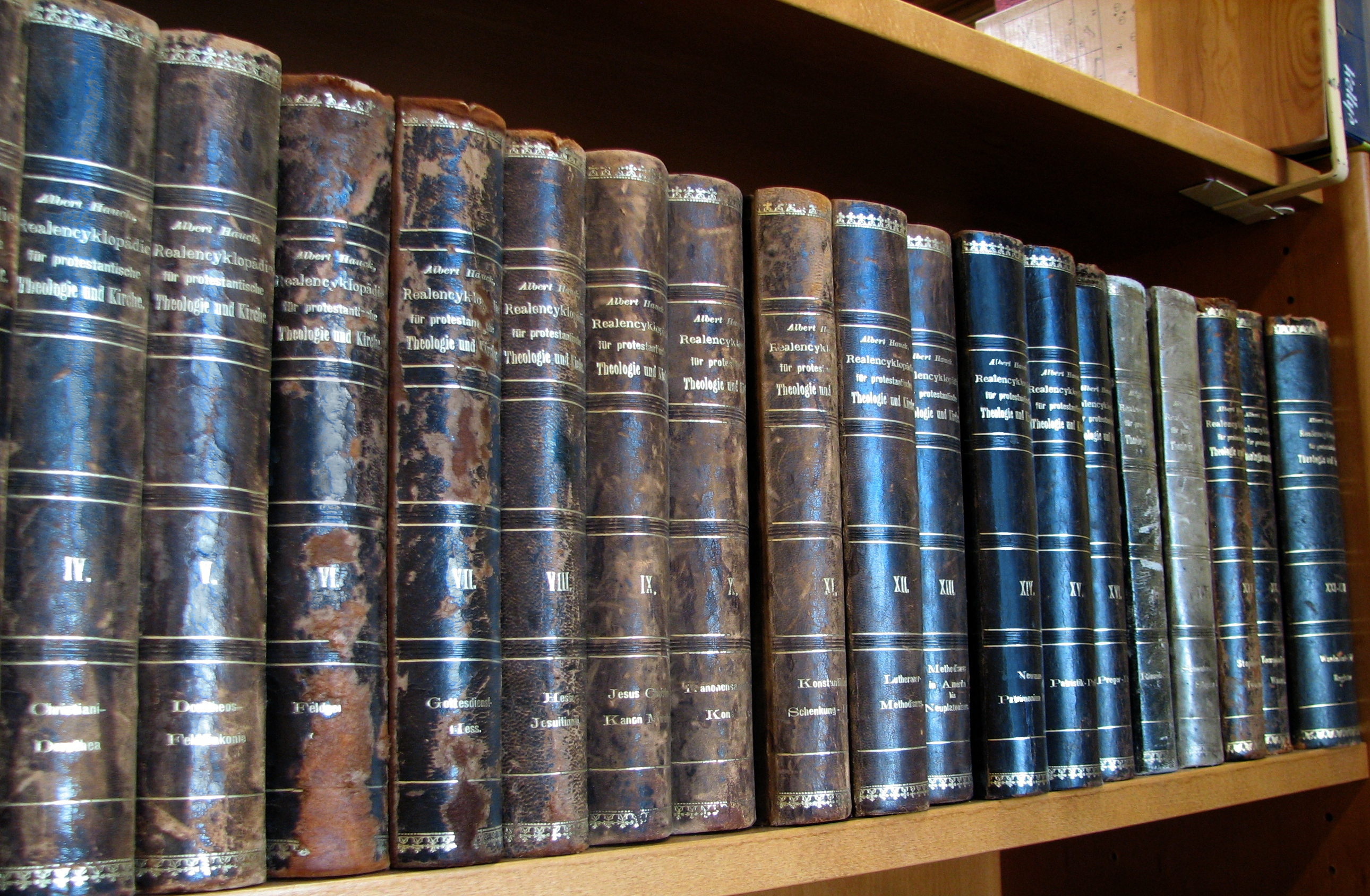
The German Realenzyklopädie für protestantische Theologie und Kirche, which Schaff-Herzog is based on.

The Realencyklopädie's publishing history was:

- 1853–1868: 1st ed. Ed. Johann Jakob Herzog (1805–1882). 22 vols.
- c. 1877: new ed. Ed. Herzog and G.L. Plitt (1836–1880).
- 1896–1909: 3rd ed. Ed. Albert Hauck (1845–1918). 22 vols.

The Schaff-Herzog's publishing history was:

- 1882–84: 1st ed. Ed. Philip Schaff (1819–93). (Based on the first two editions of the Realencyklopädie.)
- 1891: 3rd ed. Ed. Albert Hauck.
- 1908–14: The New Schaff-Herzog Encyclopedia of Religious Knowledge. 13 vols. This was a substantial update, based throughout on the Realencyklopädie, 3rd ed.

Christian Classics Ethereal Library has digitized the work and made it available online. Logos Bible Software is also undertaking a digitization project of it.

The new Schaff-Herzog encyclopedia of religious knowledge, embracing Biblical, historical, doctrinal, and practical theology and Biblical, theological, and ecclesiastical biography from the earliest times to the present day. Edited by Samuel MacAuley Jackson (Volumes 2 to 12 have abbreviated titles which vary slightly; volume 13 is an Index volume, which was edited by George William Gilmore).

Vol.	Year	From–to	Editor	Internet Archive (IA)	Christian Classics Ethereal library (CCEL)
1	1908	Aachen–Basilians	Samuel MacAuley Jackson	IA 1	CCEL 1
2	1908	Basilica–Chambers	Samuel MacAuley Jackson	IA 2	CCEL 2
3	1909	Chamier–Draendorf	Samuel MacAuley Jackson	IA 3	CCEL 3
4	1909	Draeseke–Goa	Samuel MacAuley Jackson	IA 4	CCEL 4
5	1909	Goar–Innocent	Samuel MacAuley Jackson	IA 5	CCEL 5
6	1910	Innocents–Liudger	Samuel MacAuley Jackson	IA 6	CCEL 6
7	1910	Liutprand–Moralities	Samuel MacAuley Jackson	IA 7	CCEL 7
8	1910	Morality–Petersen	Samuel MacAuley Jackson	IA 8	CCEL 8
9	1911	Petri–Reuchlin	Samuel MacAuley Jackson	IA 9	CCEL 9
10	1911	Reutsch–Son	Samuel MacAuley Jackson	IA 10	CCEL 10
11	1911	Son of Man – Tremellius	Samuel MacAuley Jackson	IA 11	CCEL 11
12	1912	Trench–Zwingli	Samuel MacAuley Jackson	IA 12	CCEL 12
13	1914	Index	George William Gilmore	IA 13 Index	CCEL 13 Index

== Developments ==
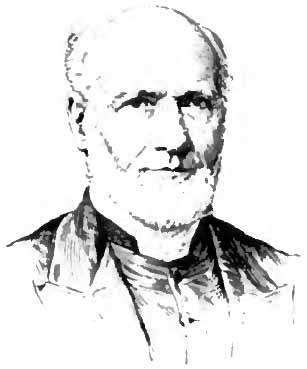
Philip Schaff

The idea of translating Herzog in a slightly condensed form occurred to John Henry Augustus Bomberger, a minister of the German Reformed Church, and then president of Ursinus College, Collegeville, Pennsylvania, and in 1856 he brought out in Philadelphia the first volume, whose title-page reads thus: The Protestant Theological and Ecclesiastical Encyclopedia: Being a Condensed Translation of Herzog's Real Encyclopedia. With Additions from Other Sources. By Rev. J. H. A. Bomberger, D.D., Assisted by Distinguished Theologians of Various Denominations. Vol. I. Philadelphia: Lindsay & Blakiston, x 1856. In this work he associated with himself twelve persons, all but one ministers. In 1860 he issued the second volume. But the American Civil War breaking out the next year put a stop to so costly an enterprise and it was never resumed. The first volume included the article "Concubinage", the second "Josiah". It had been issued in numbers, of which the last was the twelfth.

In 1877 Professor Philip Schaff (1819–93) was asked by Dr. Herzog himself to undertake an English reproduction of the second edition of his encyclopedia, and this work was fairly begun when, in the autumn of 1880, Clemens Petersen and Samuel Macauley Jackson were engaged to work daily on it in Dr. Schaff's study in the Bible House, New York City. The next year Dr. Schaff's son, the Rev. David Schley Schaff, later professor of church history in the Western Theological Seminary, Allegheny, Pa., joined the staff. The original publishers were S. S. Scranton & Company, Hartford, Conn., but a change was made before the issue of the first volume and the encyclopedia was issued by Funk & Wagnalls. The title-page read thus:

A Religious Encyclopædia: or Dictionary of Biblical, Historical, Doctrinal, and Practical Theology. Based on the Real-Encyklopädie of Herzog, Plitt, and Hauck. Edited by Philip Schaff, D.D., LL.D., Professor in the Union Theological Seminary, New York. Associate editors: Rev. Samuel M. Jackson, M. A., and Rev. D. S. Schaff. Volume I. New York: Funk & Wagnalls, Publishers, 10 and 18 Dey Street. The first volume was issued Wednesday, November 1, 1882, the second Thursday, March 1, 1883, and the third Tuesday, March 4, 1884. Volume I. had pp. xix. 1–847; volume II. pp. xvii. 848–1714; and volume III. pp. xix. 1715–2631. In November, 1886, a revised edition was issued and at the same time the Encyclopedia of Living Divines and Christian Workers of All Denominations in Europe and America, Being a Supplement to Schaff-Herzog Encyclopedia of Religious Knowledge. Edited by Rev. Philip Schaff, D.D., LL.D., and Rev. Samuel Macauley Jackson, M. A. New York: Funk & Wagnalls, Publishers, 18 and 20 Astor Place, 1887. In 1891 the third edition of the encyclopedia was issued and with it was incorporated the Encyclopedia of Living Divines, with an appendix, largely the work of Rev. George William Gilmore, bringing the biographical and literary notices down to December, 1890. The entire work was repaged sufficiently to make it one of four volumes of about equal size, and it is this four-volume edition which is known to the public as the Schaff-Herzog Encyclopedia, the volumes being respectively of pp. xlviii. 679 and four pages unnumbered; 680–1378; 1379–2086; iv. 2087–2629, viii. 296. As the German work at its base was overtaken by the time "S" had been reached, the Schaff-Herzog from that letter on was based on the first edition of Herzog. Therefore, much of its matter is now very old. Yet it has been a useful work, and in 1903 its publishers determined on a new edition based on the third edition of Herzog which had been appearing since 1896. But inasmuch as there was a space of ten years between the beginnings of the two works, it has been necessary to bring the matter from the German down to date. This end has been accomplished by two courses: first by securing from the German contributors to Herzog condensations of their contributions, in which way matter contributed to the German work has in many instances been brought down to date, and second by calling on department editors for supplementary matter.

The New Schaff-Herzog Encyclopædia of Religious Knowledge followed the previous editions. The points of similarities were:

- that at its base lay the Realencyklopädie für protestantische Theologie and Kirche
- that it gave in condensed form the information in that work, and took such matter directly from the German work in most instances, although occasionally while the topic was the same the treatment was independent of the German original;
- that it had much new information contributed by the editorial staff and specially secured contributors;
- that in biblical matters it limited its titles to those of the German base, so that it should not be considered to be a Bible dictionary.

The points of dissimilarity were:

- The new edition contains much information furnished directly by those contributors to the German work who have kindly consented to condense their articles and bring them within prescribed limits. These limits were often narrow, but in no other way was it possible to utilize the German text;
- The new edition contains hundreds of sketches of contemporary persons derived in almost every instance from information furnished by themselves. The entries are in more detail than those in the British and American Who's Who and from the German Wer ist's (a similar work for Germany);
- A much more thorough bibliography was furnished than in previous editions. The attempt was made to give sources so that students could pursue a subject to its roots; second, to supply the best literature in whatever language it occurred; third, to supply references in English for those who only read that language.
