= Battle on the Raxa =

955 AD battle between the allied Kingdom of Germany and Rani tribe against the Obotrites

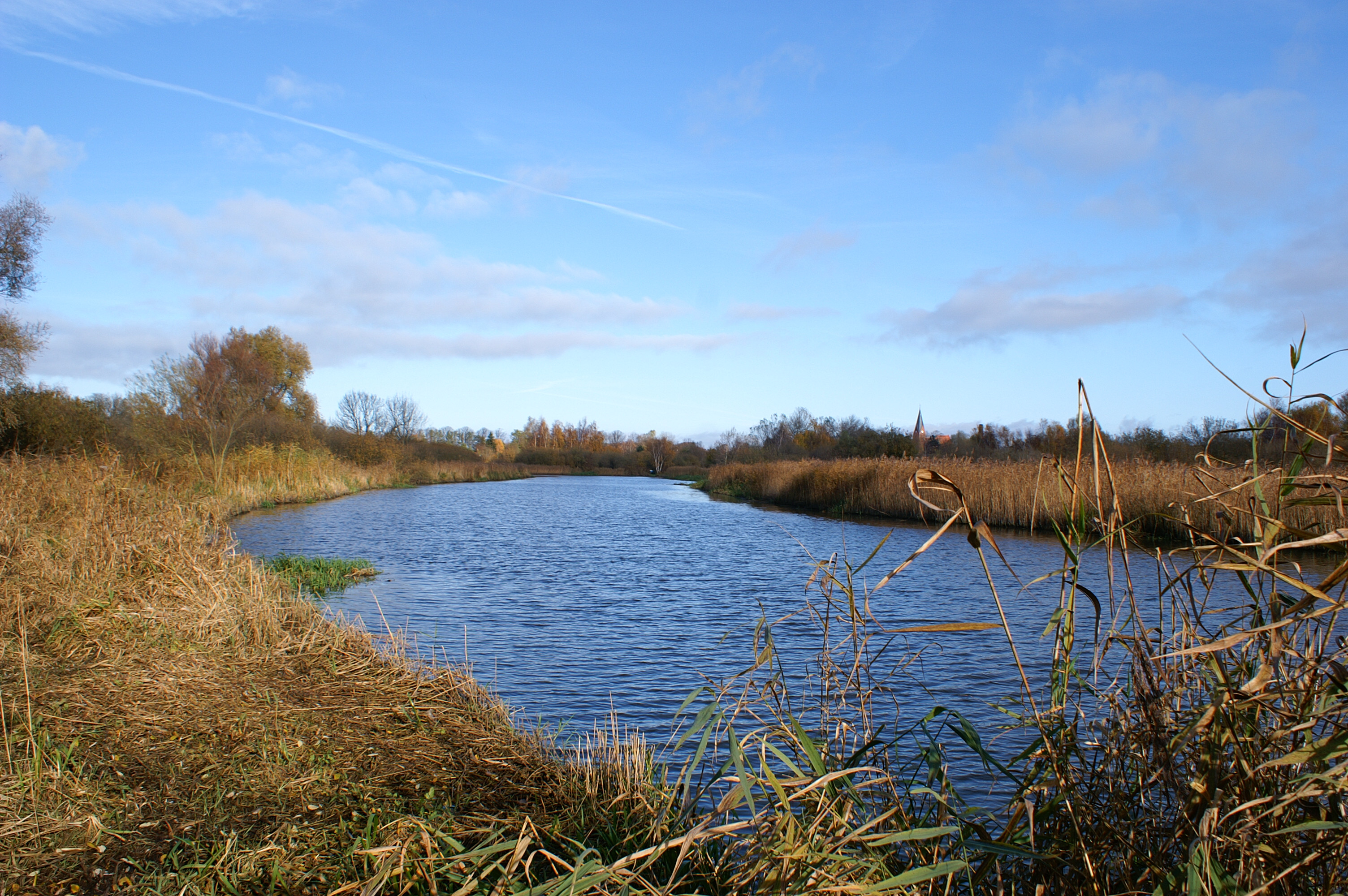
- Recknitz Damgarten
| Date | 16 October 955 |
| Location | uncertain, probably on the Recknitz or Elde rivers |
| Result | German victory |

Belligerents
| Kingdom of Germany; Rani | Obotrites, Veleti, and allied Slavs |

Commanders and leaders
| Otto I of Germany | Nako; Stoigniew (executed) |

Casualties and losses
| Unknown | 700 prisoners executed |

The Battle on the Raxa river (German: Schlacht an der Raxa) was fought on 16 October 955 over control of the Billung march (in present-day Mecklenburg-Vorpommern, northeast Germany) between the forces of Otto I of Germany allied with the Rani tribe on one side, and the Obotrite federation under Nako and his brother Stoigniew (Stoinef, Stoinneg, Stoinegin, Ztoignav) with their allied and tributary Slav neighbours on the other. The Raxa river is identified with either the Recknitz or the Elde river. The German victory over the Slavs followed up on the August victory at the Lechfeld over the Magyars and marked the high point of Otto's reign.

== Background ==
While King Otto was distracted by his campaigns against the Magyars, his vassals Wichmann the Younger and his brother Egbert the One-Eyed instigated a Slav revolt in the Billung March. The Obotrites invaded Saxony and sacked the Cocarescemians' settlement, killing the men of arms-bearing age and carrying off the women and children into slavery. According to Widukind of Corvey, in the aftermath of Lechfeld, Otto pressed hard into Slav territory, where Wichmann and Egbert had sought refuge.

Otto razed the Slav population centres and soon had encircled them; he offered to spare his enemies if they would surrender. A Slav embassy came to an assembly Otto held in Saxony and offered to pay annual tribute in return for being allowed self-government; "otherwise," they said, they would "fight for their liberty." Reuter argues that this is indicative of a change in German governing practice: a change from overlordship, which the Slavs were willing to accept, to lordship, which the Slavs protested.

Dendrodates reveal that in the context of the Saxon-Obotrite conflict, the Slavs in present-day northeast Germany started to build many forts – only few forts were built before. A second phase of extensive fort construction occurred in the 980s, in the context of the great uprising of 983.

== Contemporary accounts ==
The course of the battle is described in Widukind of Corvey's chronicle Rerum gestarum Saxonicarum lib. III c. LIII-LV and, in less detail, in Thietmar of Merseburg's Chronicon lib. II.12. Short mentions of the battle are recorded in the respective paragraphs about the year 955 in the continuation of the annals of Prüm Abbey and the annals of S^{t}. Gallen Abbey.

== Location ==
Sources are vague about the site of the battle. Widukind of Corvey said the battlefield was the swampy valley of a river named Raxa, which has been identified as either the Recknitz or Elde river.

== Battle ==
According to Timothy Reuter, Otto I's army of the day was drawn from every regnum (duchy) of the German kingdom, even Bohemia. According to Widukind of Corvey, who gave the only surviving detailed record of the battle, Otto I's campaign came to a halt at the bank of the Raxa river, where the Obotrites and their allies, led by Stoigniew (Stoinef), had taken a defensive position on the opposite embankment. Otto's margrave Gero, together with the allied tribe of the Ruani – most probably the earliest mention of the Rani – secretly moved to a distinct part of the river to build three bridges, while a feint assault by the remaining forces distracted Stoigniew's army. Stoigniew realized too late that Otto's forces were already crossing the river on another side, and the ensuing encounter was won by the latter.

The fate of Stoigniew is described by both Widukind of Corvey and Thietmar of Merseburg. While both agree that he was decapitated, their accounts on how that happened differ: Widukind says that during the battle, Stoigniew was chased into a wood, defeated, disarmed and beheaded by a soldier named Hosed, who was handsomely rewarded after presenting Otto with Stoigniew's severed head.

Thietmar of Merseburg claims the captured Stoigniew, whom he calls Stoinneg, was decapitated by Otto. After the battle, according to Widukind, Stoinegin's head was raised on a pole and seven hundred captured Slavs were executed before sundown.

The annals of St. Gallen also report the violent death of Stoigniew, whom they name Ztoignav, but do not detail how he had died. They do however date the battle to the day of their patron, Saint Gall – i.e. 16 October.

== Sources ==
=== Bibliography ===
Primary sources

- Annales Sangallenses maiores editit I. ab Arx. Pars altera a. 919 – 1056, in Georg Heinrich Pertz (ed.): MGH SS 1, Hannover 1826, p. 79 (a. 955).
- Reginonis abbatis Prumiensis Chronicon cum continuatione Treverensi, in Friedrich Kurze (ed.): MGH SS rer. Germ. 50, Hannover 1890, p. 168 (a. 955).
- Thietmari Merseburgensis episcopi chronicon, in Robert Holtzman (ed.): Die Chronik des Bischofs Thietmar von Merseburg und ihre Korveier Überarbeitung. MGH SS rer. Germ. NS 9, Berlin 1935, pp. 50 ff.
- Widukindi monachi Corbeiensis rerum gestarum Saxonicarum libri tres, in Paul Hirsch et al. (eds.): MGH SS rer. Germ. 60, Hannover 1935, pp. 132 ff.

Literature

- Joachim Henning: Der slawische Siedlungsraum und die ottonische Expansion östlich der Elbe. Ereignisgeschichte – Archäologie – Dendrochronologie. In: Joachim Henning (ed.): Europa im 10. Jahrhundert. Archäologie einer Aufbruchszeit. Internationale Tagung in Vorbereitung der Ausstellung "Otto der Große, Magdeburg und Europa," Mainz 2002, pp. 131–146.
- Leyser, Karl. "Henry I and the Beginnings of the Saxon Empire." The English Historical Review, Vol. 83, No. 326. (Jan., 1968), pp 1–32.
- Heike Reimann, Fred Ruchhöft, Cornelia Willich: Rügen im Mittelalter. Eine interdisziplinäre Studie zur mittelalterlichen Besiedlung auf Rügen (Forschungen zur Geschichte und Kultur des Östlichen Mitteleuropa vol. 36), Stuttgart 2011.
- Timothy Reuter: Germany in the Early Middle Ages 800–1056. New York: Longman, 1991.
- James Westfall Thompson: Feudal Germany. 2 vol. New York: Frederick Ungar Publishing Co., 1928.
