= Nako (Obotrite prince) =

Obotrite prince and leader

Nako, Nakon, Nakko, or Nacco (flourished 954 – c. 966) was an Obotrite leader who, along with his brother Stoigniew, led the forces of a Slavic confederacy in a revolt against the Germans, especially Herman Billung, Duke of Saxony.

In 955 Nako and Stoignew were defeated at the Battle of Recknitz by Otto I of Germany. While Stoignew was beheaded, Nako probably accepted Christianity, because there followed roughly thirty years of peace, during which, according to Adam of Bremen, the Slavs were Christian. Nako and his successors, the Nakonids, resided in a "ringwall" of fortresses: Mecklenburg, Starigard, Liubice, and Lenzen (Lunkini). When the Sephardic geographer Abraham ben Jacob travelled through the territory, he referred to Mecklenburg, Nako's principal palace, as "Nako's castle."

He was succeeded by his sons Mstivoj and Mstidrag, but they abandoned Christianity and revolted against the Germans again.
