= Johann Jakob Herzog =

Swiss-German Protestant theologian (1805–1882)

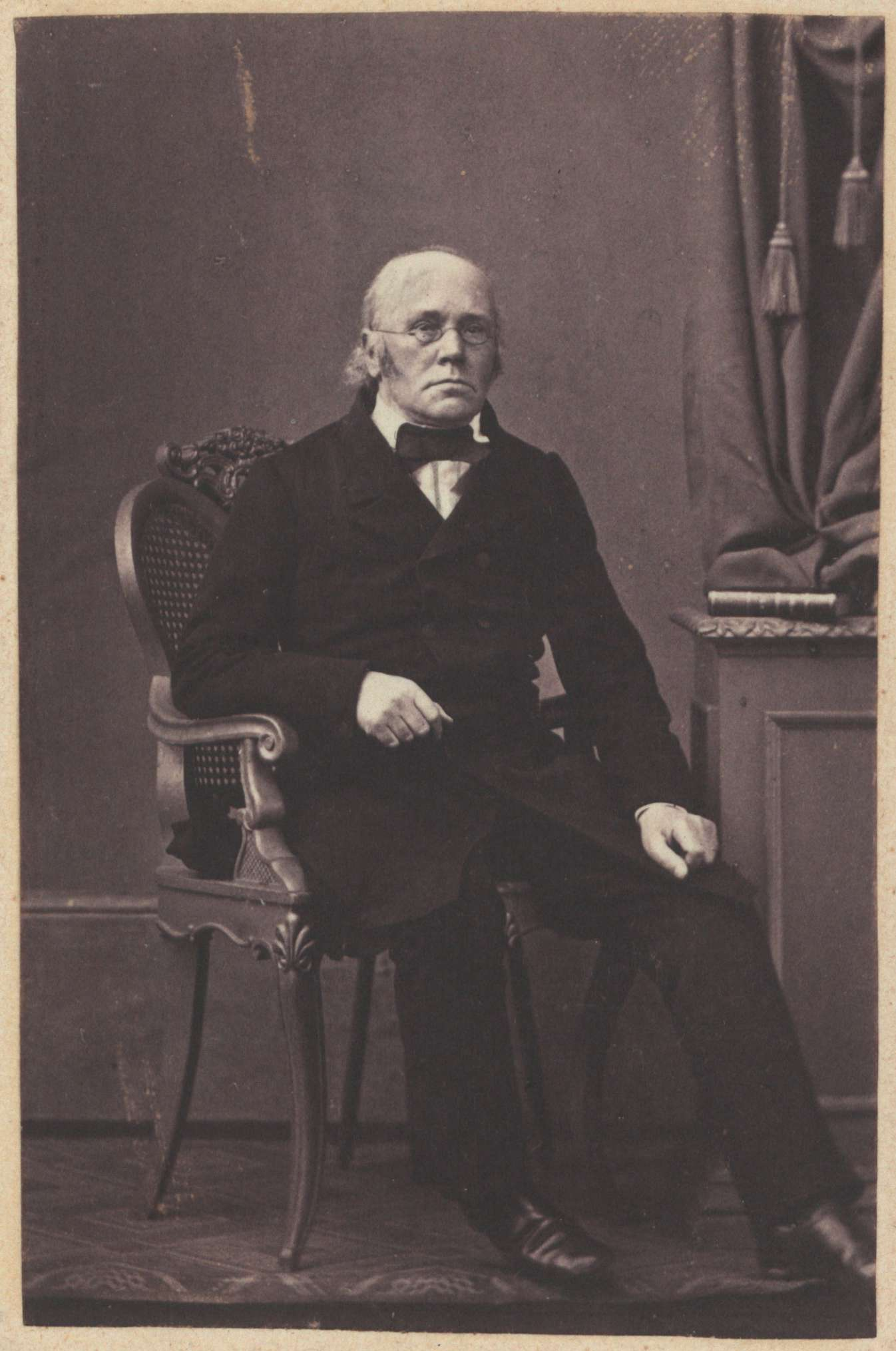
Johann Jakob Herzog

Johann Jakob Herzog (12 September 1805 – 30 September 1882) was a Swiss-German Protestant theologian.

== Life ==
Herzog was born in Basel. Herzog studied theology at the University of Basel and Berlin, earning his doctorate at the University of Basel in 1830. In 1835-1846 he was a professor of historical theology at the Academy in Lausanne. Afterwards he served as a professor in Halle, and eventually (1854), he settled at Erlangen as a professor of church history.

Herzog is remembered for his writings on the history of the Reformation (Zwingli, John Calvin, Johannes Oecolampadius), and for his studies of the Waldensian Church.

Herzog was author of the "Real-Encyklopädie für protestantische Theologie und Kirche" (1853–1868, 22 volumes), of which a new edition, in collaboration with Gustav Leopold Plitt and Albert Hauck, was published from 1877 to 1888 (18 volumes). From 1896 to 1913, Hauck released a third edition of the encyclopedia (24 volumes; Vol 1–22, 1896–1909, with two later supplements). Based on the encyclopedia's third edition, the New Schaff-Herzog Encyclopedia of Religious Knowledge was subsequently published in English from 1908 to 1914 (13 volumes). He died in Erlangen.

== Other writings by Herzog ==
- Das Leben Johannes Oekolampads und die Reformation der Kirche zu Basel, 1843.
- Die romanischen Waldenser, ihre vorreformatorischen Zustände und Lehren, 1853.
- Abriss der gesammten Kirchengeschichte (3 volumes, 1876–1882, 2nd edition, G Koffmane, Leipzig, 1890–1892).
