= Annales Sangallenses maiores =

The Annales Sangallenses maiores (Latin for Greater Annals of St. Gall) are annals compiled in St. Gallen, covering the years 927 through to 1059. They continue the Annales Alamannici, the St. Gallen version of which reaches up to 926.

The Annales record the most northerly sighting of the supernova of 1006, providing independent data as to its magnitude and location in the sky:

"[i]n a wonderful manner this was sometimes contracted, sometimes diffused, and moreover sometimes extinguished ... It was seen likewise for three months in the inmost limits of the south, beyond all the constellations which are seen in the sky".

== Editions, facsimiles, and translations ==
- 'XVI Annales Sangallenses Maiores', ed. by Ildefonsus ab Arx, in Annales et chronica aevi Carolini, ed. by Georgius Heinricus Pertz, Monumenta Germaniae Historica, 1 (Hannover: Tomusus, 1826), pp. 72–85
- Roland Zingg, Die St. Galler Annalistik (Ostfildern: Jan Thorbecke Verlag, 2019) [edition and German translation]
- Chris Halsted, 'The Greater Annals of St. Gall: Introduction, Translation, and Notes', Leeds Medieval Studies, 3 (2023), 25–59, doi:10.57686/256204/30 [English translation]
- Cod. Sang. 915 in E-codices; the annals begin on page 196. The autograph manuscript of the annals.
- Cod. Sang. 453 in E-codices; the annals begin on page 211. A twelfth-century copy.
