= Mstislav (given name) =

Name list

Mstislav, Mścisław
- Gender: male

Origin
- Origin: Slavic
- Meaning: msti/mści ("vengeance") + slav/sław ("glory, famous")

Other names
- Variant forms: Mstislava (f), Mścisława (f)
- Nicknames: Mszczuj, Slava, Slavko,
- Related names: Mściwoj, Mstivoj, Mszczuj

Mstislav or Mścisław (Polish) - is an old Slavic origin given name, consists of two elements: msti - "vengeance" and slav- - "glory, fame". The feminine forms are Mstislava and Mścisława.

== List of people with the given name Mstislav ==
=== Royalty ===
- Mstislav of Chernigov (d. 1036), or Mstislav the Brave, son of Vladimir the Great
- Mstislav I of Kiev (d. 1125), or Mstislav the Great, last sovereign of united Kievan Rus
- Mstislav II of Kiev (? - 1172)
- Mstislav III of Kiev, or Mstislav Romanovich the Old
- Mstislav the Eyeless (d. 1178), of Rostov and Novgorod
- Mstislav Rostislavich (d. 1180), "the Brave", of Smolensk
- Mstislav Mstislavich (d. 1228), or Mstislav the Bold, of Novgorod
- Mstislav Danylovich (d. aft 1300), King Danylo's son

=== Others ===
- Mstislav Dobuzhinsky (1875–1957), Russian-Lithuanian artist
- Mstislav Keldysh (1911–1978), Soviet scientist in the field of mathematics and mechanics
- Mstislav Rostropovich (1927–2007), Russian cellist and conductor

== See also ==
- Mieczysław
- Mislav
- Mstsislaw
