= Albert Hauck =

German theologian and church historian

- Born: Albert Heinrich Friedrich Stephan Ernst Louis Hauck; 9 December 1845; Wassertrüdingen, Kingdom of Bavaria, German Confederation
- Died: 7 April 1918 (aged 72); Leipzig, Kingdom of Saxony, German Empire
- Known for: Church historian

Albert Heinrich Friedrich Stephan Ernst Louis Hauck (9 December 1845 – 7 April 1918) was a German theologian and church historian.

Hauck began studying theology in 1864 in Erlangen, and then from 1866 in Berlin, where he was taught by Leopold von Ranke, the father of the source and methods-based German historiography; Hauck later commented that von Ranke was the greatest man he'd ever known. He passed the state exam in 1868 in Ansbach. In 1870 he became vicar in Munich, moved to Feldkirchen in 1871, and in 1875 was appointed priest for the parish of Frankenheim.

Since 1878 Hauck taught church history and Christian archeology at the University of Erlangen, and in 1889 was appointed professor of church history at the University of Leipzig. His most important publication is the Kirchengeschichte Deutschlands ("Church history of Germany," 1887–1920), a standard reference in the field. He also edited and published the third edition of the Schaff-Herzog Encyclopedia of Religious Knowledge.

== Sources ==
- Hermann Heimpel (1969). "Hauck, Albert". Neue Deutsche Biographie (in German). Vol. 8. Berlin: Duncker & Humblot. pp. 75–76.
- Friedrich Wilhelm Bautz (1990). "Hauck, Albert". In Bautz, Friedrich Wilhelm (ed.). Biographisch-Bibliographisches Kirchenlexikon (BBKL) (in German). Vol. 2. Hamm: Bautz. cols. 592–593. ISBN 3-88309-032-8.
- Martin Teubner: Historismus und Kirchengeschichtsschreibung. Leben und Werk Albert Haucks (1845–1918) bis zu seinem Wechsel nach Leipzig 1889. Göttingen 2008. ISBN 978-3-525-55205-6.
