= Arnoldi Chronica Slavorum =

Chronicle by Arnold of Lübeck

Arnoldi Chronica Slavorum is a medieval chronicle by Arnold of Lübeck (d. 1211–1214). It was composed at the beginning of the 13th century, as a continuation of an earlier Chronica Slavorum that was written by Helmold of Bosau. Arnold's chronicle was continued down to 1209.

== See also ==
- Polabian Slavs

== Sources ==
- Lappenbergius, Johannes Martinus; Pertz, Georgius Heinricus, eds. (1868). Arnoldi Chronica Slavorum. Hannoverae: Impensis Bibliopolii Hahniani.
- Lappenbergius, Johannes Martinus; Pertz, Georgius Heinricus, eds. (1869). "Arnoldi abbatis Lubecensis Chronica". Monumenta Germaniae Historica: Scriptores. Vol. 21. Hannoverae: Impensis Bibliopolii Auici Hahniani. pp. 100–250.
- Loud, Graham A., ed. (2019). The Chronicle of Arnold of Lübeck. London and New York: Routledge.
