= Johannes Tiedemann =

Last Prince-Bishop of Lübeck (1503–1561)

The Most Reverend Johannes IX Tiedemann
- Prince-Bishop of Lübeck
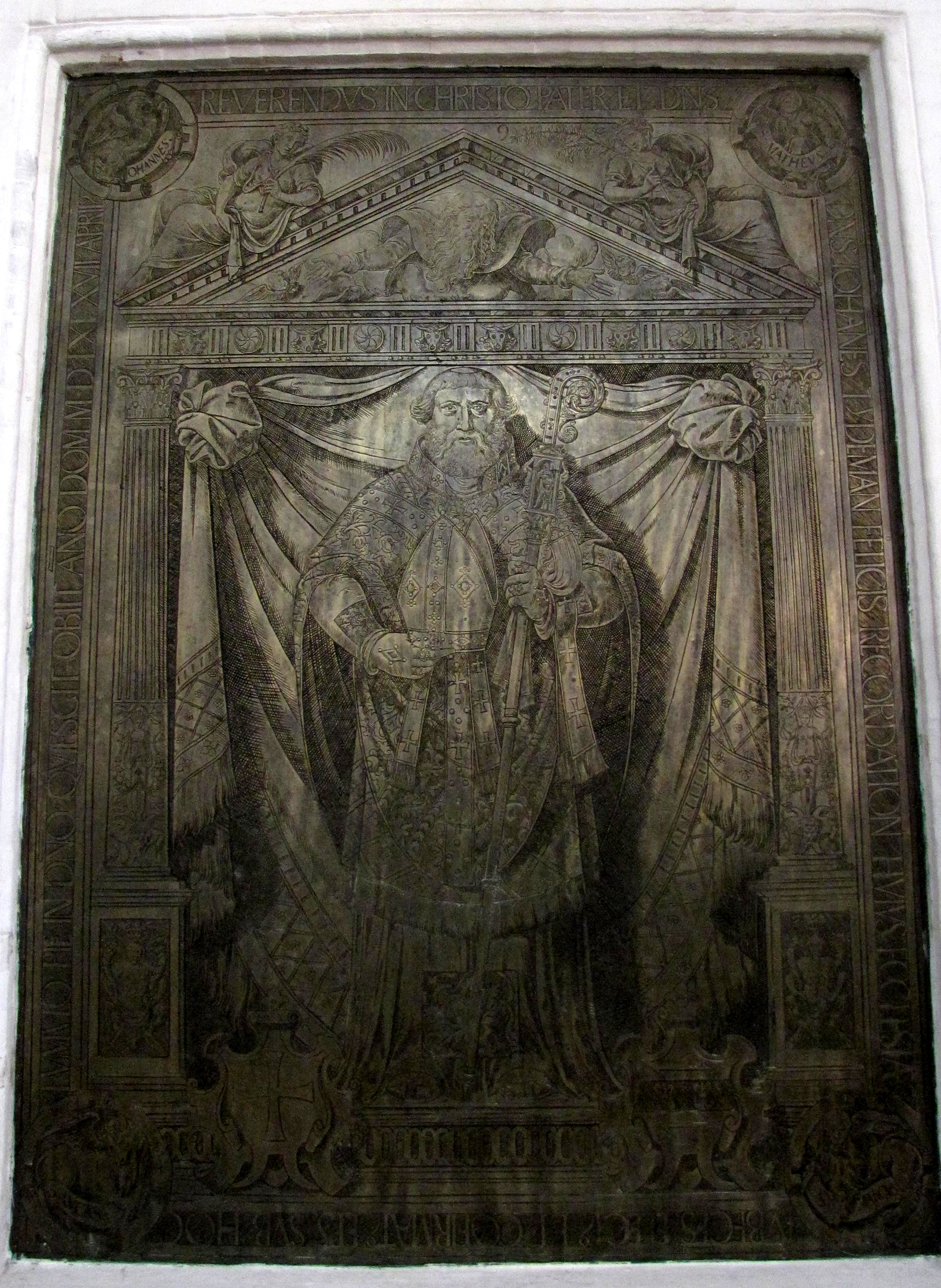
- Brass tombstone of Bishop Johannes Tiedemann in Lübeck Cathedral
- Church: Roman Catholic
- Diocese: Diocese of Lübeck
- Elected: 11 August 1559
- Term ended: 17 April 1561
- Predecessor: Andreas von Barby
- Successor: Eberhard von Holle

Personal details
- Born: c. 1503; Stadthagen
- Died: 17 April 1561; Bremen

Johannes Tiedemann (c. 1503 – 17 April 1561) known as Johannes IX, was the last Catholic Prince-Bishop of Lübeck.

== Life ==
Johann Tiedemann was born around 1503 in Stadthagen, a son of Hans Tiedemann and his wife Geseke and brother of Christoph Tiedemann. His mother was a sister of the Lübeck council secretary and cathedral dean Johannes Rode, who also came from Stadthagen. In 1528 Tiedemann received a prebend at Lübeck Cathedral. In 1544 he was appointed Vice Dean of the absent Dean Johannes von Weeze. After his death in 1548 he was elected cathedral dean by the cathedral chapter and in the same year appointed vicar general for the absent bishop Theodor von Rheden. On 11 August 1559, the chapter elected him to succeed Andreas von Barby as Bishop of Lübeck. He received papal confirmation on 20 February 1561, but died shortly thereafter.

His double epitaph together with his brother, the canons in Lübeck and Ratzeburg Christoph Tiedemann († 1561), with a Latin inscription is in the ambulatory of Lübeck Cathedral. His monumental bronze tombstone in the Renaissance style is also in the cathedral, formerly in the choir, since the end of the 19th century on the south wall in the south aisle. It shows him in full pontifical vestments, albeit not yet consecrated with the mitre in hand, and was made in 1563 by the Lübeck council founder Matthias Benningk. It is the only surviving Renaissance grave slab of this type and size in Lübeck.

== Literature ==
- Wolfgang Prange: Johannes Tiedemann der letzte katholische Bischof von Lübeck. In: Zeitschrift des Vereins für Lübeckische Geschichte und Altertumskunde. 1974, Bd. 54–56 S. 7 f.
- Wolfgang Prange: Tiedemann, Johannes. In: Olaf Klose, Eva Rudolph (Hrsg.): Schleswig-Holsteinisches Biographisches Lexikon, Bd. 4. Wachholtz, Neumünster 1976, S. 222f.
- Karl Hengst: Die Bischöfe des Heiligen Römischen Reiches 1448 bis 1648. S. 93.
- Friedrich Wilhelm Ebeling: Die deutschen Bischöfe bis zum Ende des sechzehnten Jahrhunderts - Biographisch, literarisch, historisch und kirchenstatistisch dargestellt. 1. Band, Leipzig 1858, S. 562–589.
- Ernst Friedrich Mooyer: Verzeichnisse der deutschen Bischöfe seit dem Jahre 800 nach Chr. Geb. Minden 1854, S. 56–57.
- Hermann Grote: Stammtafeln, Leipzig 1877
