= Rantzau =

Rantzau may refer to:

== Places ==
- Rantzau (Amt), an Amt in the district of Pinneberg, Schleswig-Holstein, Germany
- Rantzau, Plön, a municipality in the district of Plön, Schleswig-Holstein, Germany
- Rantzau (county), a former state in the Holy Roman Empire

== People ==
- Johan Rantzau (1492–1565), German-Danish general and statesman
- Balthasar Rantzau (c. 1497–1547), Prince-Bishop of Lübeck, Germany
- Heinrich Rantzau (1526–1598), German-Danish humanist writer and statesman
- Daniel Rantzau (1529–1569), Danish-German general
- Breide Rantzau (died 1618), German nobleman in Danish service
- Gert Rantzau (1558–1627) German nobleman in Danish service
- Christian zu Rantzau (1614–1663), governor of the Duchy of Holstein
- Jørgen Rantzau (1652–1713), Danish military officer
- Josias von Rantzau (1609–1650), Danish military officer and Marshal of France
- Christian Rantzau (1684–1771), Danish nobleman, civil servant and Governor-general of Norway
- Schack Carl Rantzau (1717–1789), Danish-German general
- Ulrich von Brockdorff-Rantzau (1869–1928), German diplomat
- Heino von Rantzau (1894–1946), German Luftwaffe General

== Other ==
- Rantzau (family), a noble family of Schleswig-Holstein, Germany
- Rantzau (horse) (1946–1971), a racehorse
- Rantzau (river), a river in Schleswig-Holstein, Germany
- I Rantzau, an 1892 opera by Pietro Mascagni
