= Bosau =

- Municipality
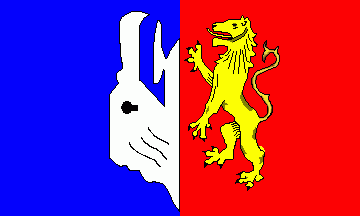
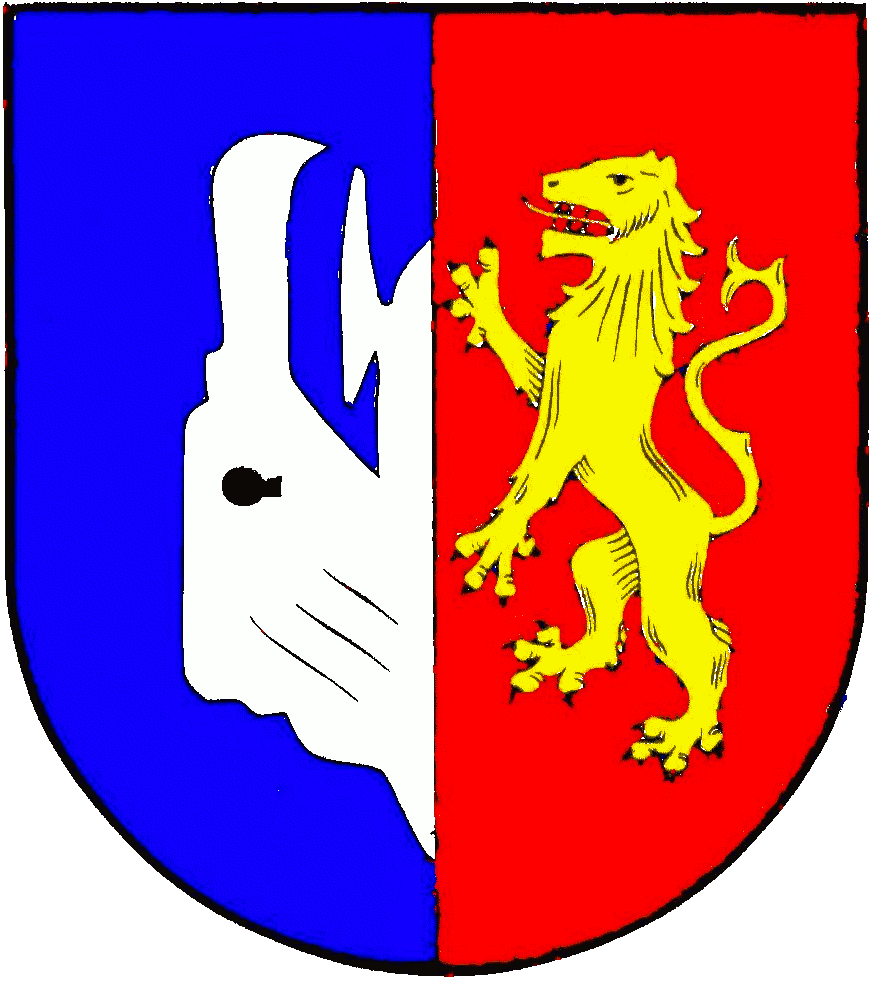
- Flag Coat of arms

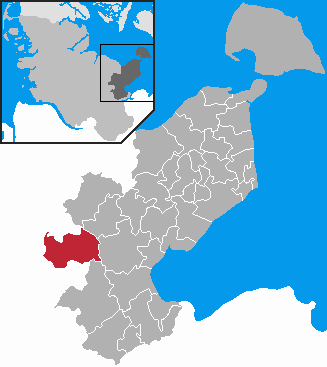
- Location of Bosau within Ostholstein district
- Interactive map of Bosau
- Location within Germany Location within Schleswig-Holstein
- Coordinates: 54°6′12″N 10°25′57″E
- Country: Germany
- State: Schleswig-Holstein
- District: Ostholstein
- Municipal assoc.: Großer Plöner See

Government
  - Mayor: Eberhard Rauch (CDU)

Area
  - Total: 64.25 km^{2} (24.81 sq mi)
- Elevation: 25 m (82 ft)

Population (2025-12-31)
  - Total: 3,443
  - Density: 53.59/km^{2} (138.8/sq mi)
- Time zone: UTC+01:00 (CET)
  - Summer (DST): UTC+02:00 (CEST)
- Postal codes: 23715
- Dialling codes: 04527
- Vehicle registration: OH
- Website: www.amt-grosser-ploener-see.de

Bosau (German pronunciation) is a municipality on the Great Plön Lake the district of Ostholstein, in Schleswig-Holstein, Germany. It is situated approximately 13 km west of Eutin, and 30 km southeast of the state capital of Kiel.

== Name ==
The name of this settlement was recorded as:

- Buzu (980);
- Bozoe (1156);
- Bosowe (1183).

== Parishes ==
The following villages belong to the municipality of Bosau: Bichel, Braak, Brackrade, Hassendorf, Hutzfeld, Kiekbusch, Kleinneudorf, Klenzau, Liensfeld, Löja, Majenfelde, Quisdorf, Thürk and Wöbs.

== St. Peter's Church, Bosau ==
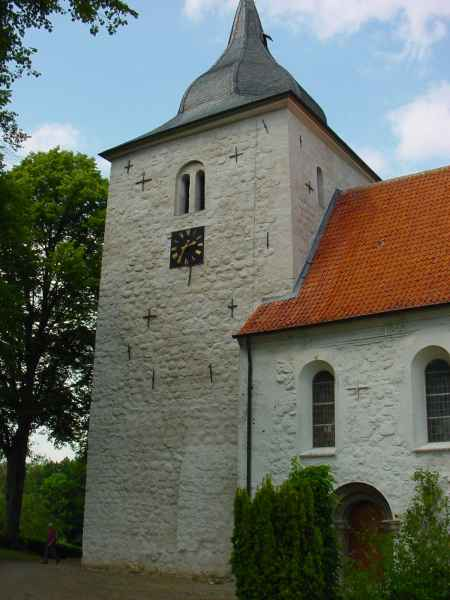
St. Peter's

Bosau is particularly well known for its church, dedicated to St. Peter, which was built in 1151/52. It was established during the Christianisation of Slavic East Holstein (Ostholstein). The missionary, Vicelin, who was appointed in 1149 by Henry the Lion as the bishop of Oldenburg in Holstein, was given Bosau as a temporary seat of office (Amtssitz), where he had a church built in 1151/52. In 1152 Vicelin suffered a stroke and died in 1154 in Neumünster. The priest, Helmold von Bosau, reported this in his Chronica Slavorum.

== Bosau summer concerts and summer academies ==
For over 40 years, the Evangelical Lutheran Church Bosau has organized the Bosau Summer Concert (Bosauer Sommerkonzerte) in St. Peter's Church. Since 2003, Bosau's church musician and organist, Sergei Tcherepanov, has been the artistic director of the summer concerts. He has designed this series of events to be an attractive festival with a different focus: organ concerts of classical style, days of the alternative organ music "The Organ Dances", concerts, chamber music, choral and solo performances. Since 2008, the summer concerts will be sponsored by a society, the Friends of the Bosau Summer Concerts (Freunde der Bosauer Sommerkonzerte), who will assist in laying on the event.

For the first time in 2009 a Bosau International Summer Academy (Internationale Sommerakademie Bosau) was held in parallel with the summer concerts, at which over 35 participants from several countries gave master classes in organ, harpsichord, oboe and baroque violin. The summer academy was also initiated and organised by S. Tcherepanov, but support came especially from the teachers of the Lübeck Academy of Music. The final concerts by the academy students and teachers are an attractive addition to the summer concerts. The summer academy will take place in future every year as part of the summer concerts.

== Weapons testing ==
In 1939 the company of Hellmuth Walter KG Kiel acquired land by the Plön lake and built their factory's test site in Stadtbek. Here torpedoes and launch systems (Schlitzrohrschleuder, lit. "slotted tube catapult") were tested. This Walter Schlitzrohrschleuder system was a chemical steam catapult that was used until the end of the war. The Fi 103 flying bomb, later called a Vergeltungswaffe ("revenge weapon") or V1, was fired into the air at a speed of 350 km/h from the Walter launch system (catapult) using a steam piston. The piston was released and the Fi-103 flew on under its own pulsating jet engine. The buildings of the test site, constructed on piles in the lake, were blown up after the war by the Allies.

== Politics ==
Although Bosau lies in the district of Ostholstein, it has belonged since 1 January 2007 to the Amt of Großer Plöner See, whose other parishes belong to Plön district, which also acts as the supervisory authority over the Amt. The Amt is managed by the higher council for the municipality of Bosau in Hutzfeld. The seat of the Amt is, however, in the town of Plon which does not belong to it.

=== Parish council ===
Following the 2008 local elections, of the 19 seats on the parish council, the CDU has had nine seats, the SPD and the Voter's Union (WGB) have had four each and the FDP two seats.

=== Mayors ===
- 1945-1946: Hans Sievert
- 1946-1950: Wilhelm Wulf
- 1950-1959: Alfred Ahrens, SPD
- 1960-1984: Günter Vogel, independent
- 1984-2001: Joachim Herrmann, independent
- since 2001: Mario Schmidt, independent

=== Coat of arms ===
Emblazonment:"Divided. On the left in blue, a silver stylized eagle head with the beak up, on the right in red a golden lion rampant. "

The coat of arms was chosen by the community after the Second World War, in the absence of official seals that were free from Nazi and imperial symbols, and approved by the British military government.

=== Twinning ===
Saujon in the French département of Charente-Maritime, between La Rochelle and Bordeaux; 6,281 inhabitants.

== Economy and infrastructure ==
Bosau is a recognised climatic spa (Luftkurort) with over 100,000 guest-nights per year. The Baltic Sea coast is about 20 km away.

== Sons and daughters of the town ==
- Helmold of Bosau (ca. 1120 – after 1177), Saxon historian and parish priest of Bosau
- Hugo Süchting (1874–1916), chess player
- Heinrich Böhmcker (1896–1944), SA general and Mayor of Bremen
- Hans-Heinrich Sievert, Dr. (1909–1963), light athlete and Olympic competitor

== Sources ==
- Habich, Johannes and Hartenstein, Matthias (1982). Die Kirche zu Bosau am Plöner See. Königstein i. Ts. o. J., ISBN 3-7845-0262-8
- Führer zu vor- und frühgeschichtlichen Denkmälern, Band 10: Hansestadt Lübeck - Ostholstein - Kiel. von Zabern, Mainz 1972.
