= Helmold =

12th-century Saxon historian and priest

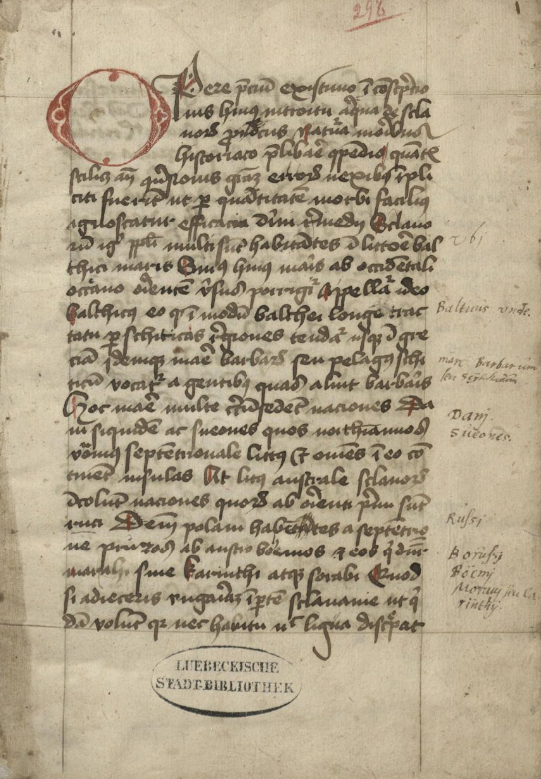
First page of the mid-15th century Lübeck manuscript of the Chronica slavorum

Helmold of Bosau (c. 1120 – after 1177) was a Saxon historian and a priest at Bosau near Plön. He was a friend of the two bishops of Oldenburg in Holstein, Vicelinus (died 1154) and Gerold (died 1163), who did much to Christianize the Polabian Slavs.

== History ==
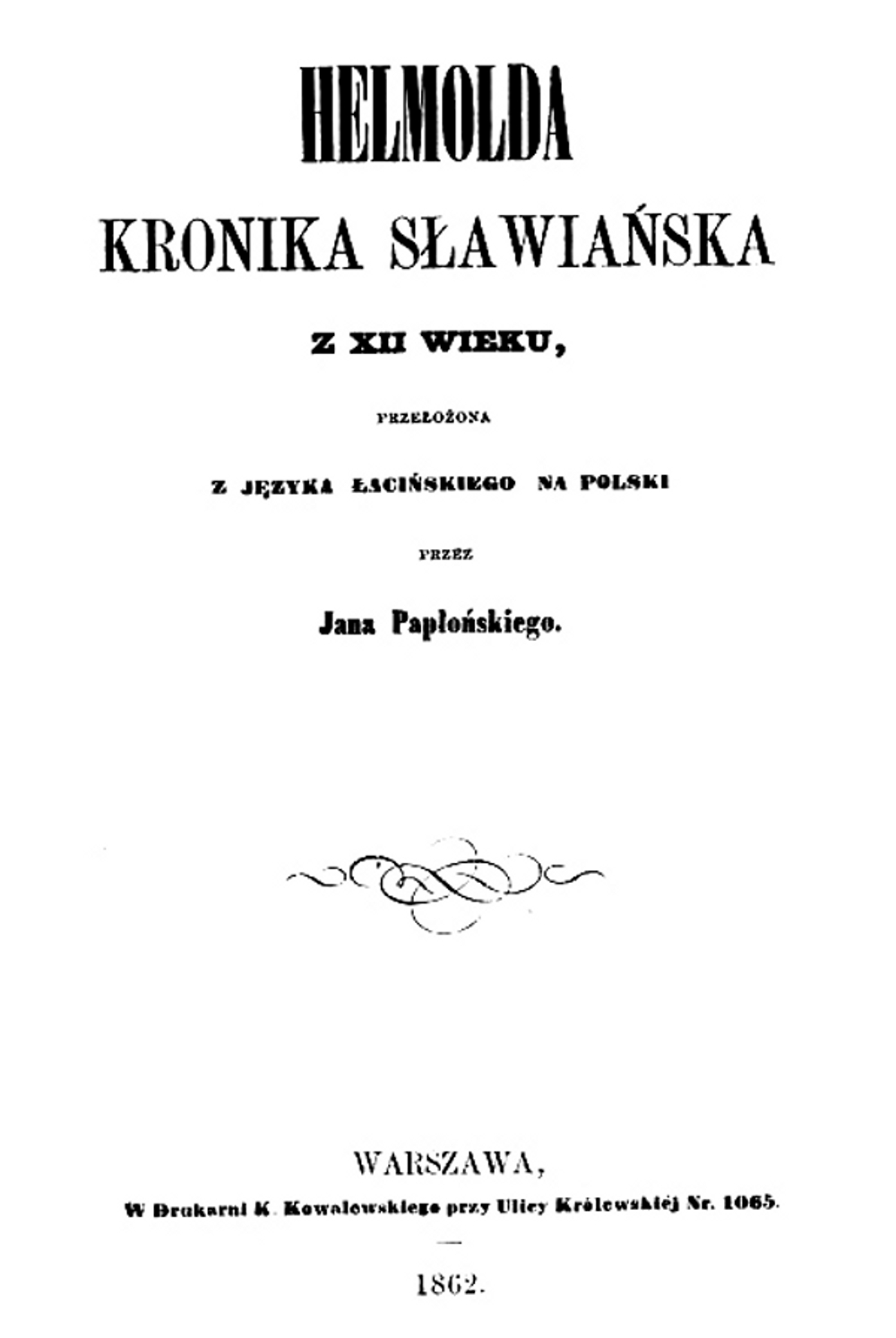
Chronica Slavorum translated into Polish by Jan Papłoński in 1862.

Helmold was born near Goslar. He grew up in Holstein, and received his instruction in Brunswick from Gerold, the future bishop of Oldenburg (1139–42). Later he came under the direction of Vicelinus, the Apostle of the Wends, first in the Augustinian monastery of Faldera, afterwards known as Neumünster (1147–53). He became a deacon about 1150, and finally became a parish priest in 1156 at Bosau on Großer Plöner See.

At Bishop Gerold's instigation Helmold wrote his Chronica Slavorum, a history of the conquest and conversion of the Polabian Slavs from the time of Charlemagne (about 800) to 1171. The purpose of this chronicle was to demonstrate how Christianity and the German nationality gradually succeeded in gaining a footing among the Wends, especially in the eastern portion of Holstein. As an eyewitness he gives a clear description in fluent Latin of Vicelinus's missionary labors, of the founding of the bishopric in Oldenburg, of the transfer of this bishopric to Lübeck when German commerce at the latter place had become more important than in the former city, of the spread of German influence among the Wends, of the merciless subjugation and extermination of these, and of the summoning to their lands of foreign settlers, principally Westphalian and Dutch. The work is divided into two parts: the first covers a period closing with the year 1168, while the second continues to the year 1171. This second part, however, was written subsequently to 1172.

Helmold was a critical historian, calling Henry the Lion "out for money", and criticizing the Wendish Crusades. He said that among the troops of Henry the Lion during the Wendish Crusade, there was "only talk of money, never about Christianity" and missionary conversion of the Slavs.

Helmold drew his knowledge of the earliest period from the church history of Adam of Bremen and the Saxon records bearing on Henry IV, besides the life of Willehadus, the list of Ansgarius, and perhaps also a life of Vicelinus, but the summaries which he made of these records are unreliable. He is, however, the most important source of information for the history of his own period, his account of which rests on the verbal information of Vicelinus and of Gerold. His fund of information becomes noticeably meager after the latter's death in 1163. His trustworthiness was seriously questioned in the 19th century (see particularly Sehirren, Beiträge zur Kritik holsteinischer Geschichtsquellen, Leipzig, 1876) owing to his antagonism towards the Archbishops of Bremen and his partiality for the Oldenburg-Lübeck bishopric, but it should not be supposed that he was guilty of an intentional falsification of facts.

The chronicle was first published in 1556 by Siegmund Schorkel, in Frankfurt am Main, while German translation was published by Johann Christian Mauritz Laurent in 1851 (1888). A scholarly edition of Latin text was published by Johann Martin Lappenberg and Georg Heinrich Pertz in 1868 (1869), while the modern edition of Latin text with German translation was published by Heinz Stoob, first in 1963, and later in several additional editions.

Henry the Lion, Duke of Saxony, was Helmold's patron. The chronicle was continued down to 1209 by Abbot Arnold of Lübeck.

== Sources ==
- Lappenbergius, Johannes Martinus; Pertz, Georgius Heinricus, eds. (1868). Helmoldi presbyteri Chronica Slavorum. Hannoverae: Impensis Bibliopolii Hahniani.
  - Lappenbergius, Johannes Martinus; Pertz, Georgius Heinricus, eds. (1869). "Helmoldi presbyteri Chronica Slavorum". Monumenta Germaniae Historica: Scriptores. Vol. 21. Hannoverae: Impensis Bibliopolii Auici Hahniani. pp. 1–99.
- Laurent, Johann Christian Mauritz, ed. (1852). Helmolds Chronik der Slaven. Berlin: Franz Duncker.
  - Laurent, Johann Christian Mauritz, ed. (1888) [1852]. Helmolds Chronik der Slaven (2nd ed.). Leipzig: Dyksche Buchhandlung.
- Rossignol, Sébastien (2014). "Bilingualism in Medieval Europe: Germans and Slavs in Helmold of Bosau's Chronicle". Central European History. 47 (3): 523–543.
- Stoob, Heinz, ed. (1963). Helmold von Bosau: Slawenchronik. Darmstadt: Wissenschaftliche Buchgesellschaft.
  - Stoob, Heinz, ed. (2002) [1963]. Helmold von Bosau: Slawenchronik (6th ed.). Darmstadt: Wissenschaftliche Buchgesellschaft.
