= Christoph Tiedemann =

German canon

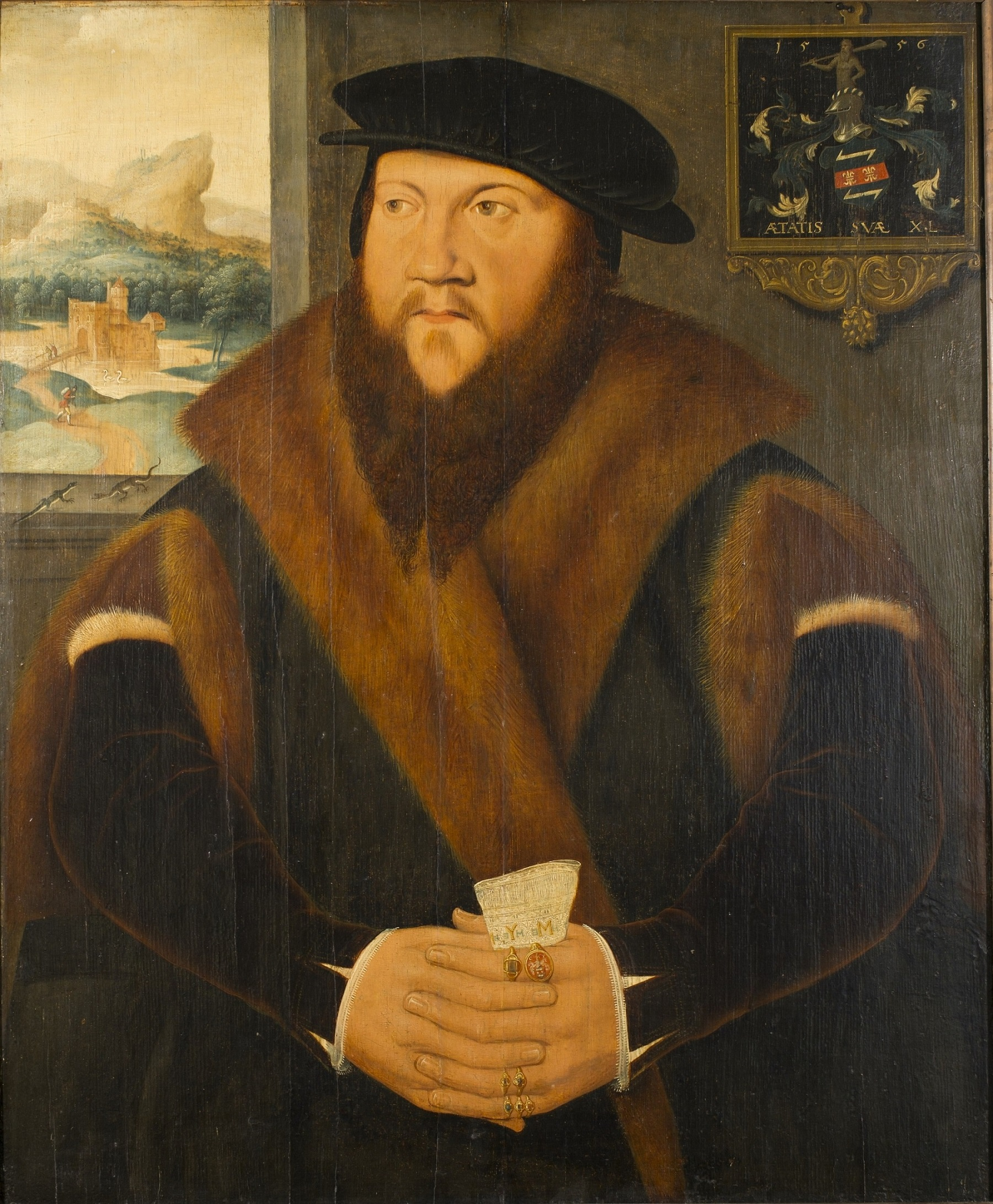
Portrait of Christoph Tiedemann, dated 1556, attributed to Hans Kemmer

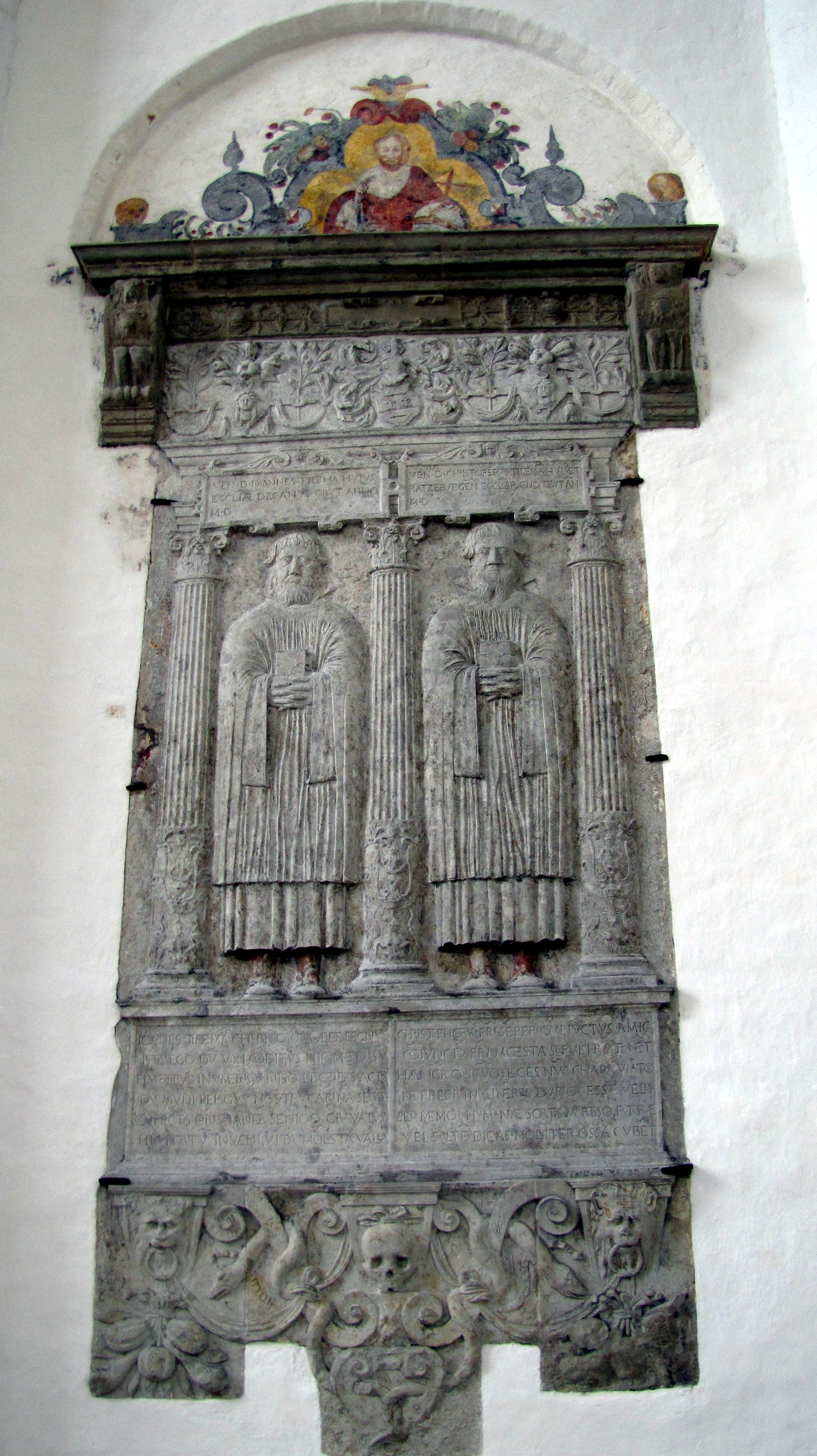
Epitaph for the brothers Christoph (right) and Johannes Tiedemann in the ambulatory of Lübeck Cathedral

Christoph Tiedemann (c. 1516 – 6 October 1561) was a German canon.

== Life ==
Christoph Tiedemann was born around 1516 in Stadthagen, a son of Hans Tiedemann and his wife Geseke. She was a sister of Stadthagen-born Lübeck council secretary and cathedral dean Johannes Rode, an opponent of the Reformation.

In 1545, Tiedemann was secretary to the Archbishop of Bremen Christoph von Braunschweig-Wolfenbüttel. In 1548 he received the Great Prebendary of the late Johannes Pumpel at the Lübeck Cathedral, where his brother Johannes Tiedemann became the cathedral dean in the same year and in 1559 the last Catholic bishop. At the same time he was canon at the Collegiate Monastery in Eutin and canon at the Ratzeburg Cathedral.

Before the election of Johannes as bishop in 1559, the two Tiedemann brothers had a double epitaph made of sandstone with a Latin inscription placed in the chancel of Lübeck Cathedral, which shows them both in choir dress.

He died on 6 October 1561 in Lübeck.

In January 2007, a portrait from 1556 was auctioned at Sotheby's, which Annette Kranz identified in 2011 without a doubt as a portrait of Christoph Tiedemann on the basis of the coat of arms and age and attributed it to Hans Kemmer. In contrast to the epitaph, it shows Tiedemann in secular clothing and pose.

It is on record that Tiedemann had a daughter Margarete with Anneke Bruneke. In his will of 1561, he considered his housekeeper Katharina Matz and her daughter Margarete.

== Bibliography ==
- Wolfgang Prange: Johannes Tiedemann der letzte katholische Bischof von Lübeck. In: Zeitschrift des Vereins für Lübeckische Geschichte und Altertumskunde. 54 (1974), S. 7–41
- Wolfgang Prange: Der Wandel des Bekenntnisses im Lübecker Domkapitel: 1530-1600. Lübeck: Schmidt-Römhild 2007 (Veröffentlichungen zur Geschichte der Hansestadt Lübeck: Reihe B; Bd. 44) ISBN 978-3-7950-0484-2, S. 136 f. (Nr. 66)
- Annette Kranz: Epitaph und Grabplatten der Brüder Johannes und Christoph Tiedemann im Lübecker Dom und ein bislang unbekanntes Porträt Hans Kemmers. In: Zeitschrift für Lübeckische Geschichte. 92 (2011), p. 81–99
