= Heinrich Böhmcker =

German Nazi politician and SA general (1896–1944)

Chairman, Bremen State Government
- In office 22 June 1937 – 16 June 1944

Bürgermeister, Bremen
- In office 16 April 1937 – 16 June 1944
- Preceded by: Otto Heider
- Succeeded by: Richard Duckwitz

Führer, SA-Gruppe Nordsee
- In office 10 July 1934 – 16 June 1944
- Preceded by: Wilhelm Freiherr von Schorlemer
- Succeeded by: Hans-Joachim Fischer

Additional positions
- 1937–1938: Senator, Bremen
- 1935–1944: State Councilor, Bremen
- 1932–1937: Regierungspräsident, Region of Lübeck
- 1931–1933: Deputy, Oldenburg Landtag

Personal details
- Born: 22 July 1896 Bosau, Grand Duchy of Oldenburg, German Empire
- Died: 16 June 1944 (aged 47) Hamburg, Nazi Germany
- Cause of death: Heart attack
- Party: Nazi Party
- Education: University of Göttingen; Westphalian Wilhelm University; Kiel University
- Profession: Lawyer
- Civilian awards: Golden Party Badge; Nuremberg Party Day Badge

Military service
- Allegiance: German Empire
- Branch/service: Imperial German Army
- Years of service: 1914–1919
- Rank: Unteroffizier
- Unit: Reserve Cavalry Detachment 78; 1st Guards Foot Artillery Regiment
- Battles/wars: World War I
- Military awards: Iron Cross, 1st and 2nd class War Merit Cross, Knight's Cross with swords

Johann Heinrich Adolph Böhmcker (22 July 1896 –16 June 1944) was a German lawyer, Nazi Party politician and member of the Party's paramilitary organization, the Sturmabteilung (SA), who rose to the rank of SA-Obergruppenführer. He served as the Regierungspräsident of the Region of Lübeck from 1932 to 1937, and as the Bürgermeister and chairman of the state government of Bremen from 1937 until his death.

== Early life and education ==
Böhmcker was born in Bosau, the only son of a farmer. He attended the local village school, followed by the Gymnasium in Eutin and left school in 1914 after passing his Notabitur exam. He volunteered for service in the First World War with the Imperial German Army. He was assigned to a dragoon unit and then to Reserve Cavalry Detachment 78 before transferring to the 1st Guards Foot Artillery Regiment. He was deployed to the eastern front in December 1914 and then to the western front. After the end of the war, he was discharged from the army in March 1919 as an Unteroffizier, having earned the Iron Cross, 1st and 2nd class.

Between March 1919 and July 1921, Böhmcker studied law at Kiel University, the University of Göttingen and the Westphalian Wilhelm University (today, the University of Münster). He was a member of the student fraternities Corps Brunsviga Göttingen and Suevia Straßburg. He passed the Referendar state examination in July 1921 at Kiel and began working as an apprentice lawyer. Around this time, Böhmcker was a member of the ultra-nationalist and antisemitic terrorist group Organisation Consul, and he was arrested and briefly detained for weapons smuggling in May 1923. In January 1927, he passed the Assessor state examination on his third attempt and became a self-employed attorney in Eutin until 1931.

== Career in the Sturmabteilung ==
Böhmcker joined the Nazi Party's paramilitary unit, the Sturmabteilung (SA), on 26 December 1925 in Eutin. He developed a reputation as a hard-drinking street brawler and acquired the nickname "Latten-Böhmcker" after his weapon of choice, a large wooden board. He was proud of this designation, and his behavior resulted in several appearances before the public prosecutor's office. As a lawyer, he successfully defended himself and his Party comrades before the courts against political charges, and often intimidated his opponents by filing lawsuits for defamation.

On 1 November 1928, Böhmcker became the leader of the SA in Eutin and, on 1 December, was named Führer of SA-Sturm (platoon) 30 in that city. On 2 June 1929, he advanced to become Führer of SA-Standarte III in Kiel and XI in the Plön District and the Region of Lübeck (not to be confused with the Hanseatic City of Lübeck). On 1 November 1930, he was named Führer of SA-Brigade XV and, on 1 July 1931, Führer of SA-Standarte 163. His next advancement came on 1 July 1932 when he was made Führer of SA-Untergruppe Ostholstein, commanding all SA units in eastern Holstein. This command was elevated to SA-Brigade Ostholstein on 1 July 1933 and he remained in command there until 9 July 1934. Following the purge of the SA known as the Night of the Long Knives, Böhmcker on 10 July 1934 replaced the ousted SA-Gruppenführer Wilhelm Freiherr von Schorlemer to take command as Führer of SA-Gruppe Nordsee, headquartered in Bremen. An SA-Gruppe was at the time the largest SA formation, and Böhmcker would hold this key post for ten years until his death.

=== SA ranks ===
SA ranks
Date	Rank
1 January 1931	SA-Standartenführer
1 July 1932	SA-Oberführer
1 July 1933	SA-Brigadeführer
9 November 1934	SA-Gruppenführer
6 October 1940	SA-Obergruppenführer

== Nazi Party political career ==
On 11 January 1926, Böhmcker joined the Nazi Party (membership number 27,601) in Ortsgruppe (local group) Eutin. As an early Party member, he would later be awarded the Golden Party Badge. By 1928, he was made a Gauredner (Gau speaker) and he took part in the 1929 Party rally in Nuremberg, for which he was awarded the Nuremberg Party Day Badge. From 1930 to 1932, he was the Bezirksleiter for Kreis Oldenburg in Holstein, Kreis Plön and the Region of Lübeck. In 1930 he was elected to the Eutin City Council, the Eutin Kreistag (district legislature) and the Landesausschuss (state committee) for the Region of Lübeck. On 17 May 1931, he was elected as a Nazi deputy to the Oldenburg Landtag (state legislature) and held this seat until that body was dissolved by the Nazis in October 1933. In November 1931, Böhmcker was the candidate for Minister-president of Oldenburg put forth by the Nazis and their coalition partner the German National People's Party, but he failed to form a government. Also in 1931, he became a member of the Association of National Socialist German Legal Professionals.

Following new Landtag elections in May 1932, the Nazis took control of the Oldenburg state government on 15 July 1932, the first German state to form a Nazi-majority government without the need for a coalition partner. The new Minister-president was Carl Röver, the Gauleiter of Gau Weser-Ems. He immediately appointed Böhmcker as the Regierungspräsident (regional president) of the Region of Lübeck, an Oldenburg exclave. After the Nazi seizure of power, Böhmcker ordered the establishment of the Eutin concentration camp in the summer of 1933. One of the so-called early camps, it was used to incarcerate the Nazi's political opponents such as Communists, Social Democrats and trade unionists. It is estimated that between 300 and 400 prisoners were jailed there in "protective custody". From October 1933 to May 1934, the prisoners were moved to the camp known as KZ Ahrensbök. In November 1933, Böhmcker ran unsuccessfully in the election for the Reichstag, an outcome that would be repeated in the March 1936 and April 1938 elections. On 30 January 1935, however, Röver appointed Böhmcker as a Staatsrat (State Councilor) of Bremen.

After the passage of the Greater Hamburg Act, the Region of Lübeck was ceded by Oldenburg to Prussia and was incorporated into its Province of Schleswig-Holstein on 1 April 1937. Böhmcker, losing his position as Regierungspräsident of the Region of Lübeck, was then appointed Regierender Bürgermeister (Governing Mayor) of Bremen by then Reichsstatthalter (Reich Governor) Röver on 16 April 1937. On 22 June, he was also made the chairman of the Bremen state government and the Senator for Internal Administration. In February 1938, he became a member of the Colonial Council of the Reichskolonialbund. In addition to his political leadership roles, Böhmcker also was directly involved in managing the economy of Bremen. He served as the chairman of the board of directors of the Bremer Landesbank (Bremen State Bank) and as a member of the supervisory board of the Bremen Cotton Exchange. From 1941, he served as the chairman of the supervisory board of the Bremen Public Utilities.

== Involvement in Kristallnacht ==
On 9 November 1938, Böhmcker was present in Munich at the 15-year memorial commemoration for the Beer Hall Putsch. When the news arrived of the assassination in Paris of the German legation secretary Ernst Eduard vom Rath, Propaganda Minister Joseph Goebbels delivered a speech to the assembled SA and Party leaders in which he blamed the Jews for vom Rath's death. Böhmcker telephoned his chief of staff in Bremen and issued the following orders for retaliation:

All Jewish shops are immediately to be destroyed by SA men in uniform … Jewish synagogues are to be immediately set on fire … The fire brigade is not allowed to interfere. Only residential buildings of Aryan Germans are to be protected by the fire brigade … The police are not permitted to interfere. The Führer wants the police not to interfere … All Jews are to be disarmed. In case of resistance, immediately shoot them down.

The outburst of organized terror came to be known as Kristallnacht, and in Bremen resulted not only in the massive destruction and arson of Jewish property, but in the deaths of five Jews and the arrest of over a thousand Jewish men from the region who were deported to the Sachsenhausen concentration camp.

== Death ==
Böhmcker was awarded the War Merit Cross, 1st and 2nd class with swords during the Second World War. He died of a heart attack on 16 June 1944 near Hanover, while traveling aboard a train from Berlin to Bremen. At his funeral on 21 June 1944, a floral wreath from Adolf Hitler was presented, and Böhmcker posthumously was awarded the Knight's Cross of the War Merit Cross with swords.

== Sources ==
- Campbell, Bruce (1998). The SA Generals and the Rise of Nazism. Lexington: University Press of Kentucky ISBN 978-0-813-12047-8
- Die SA-Gruppe Nordsee in Bremen
- Klee, Ernst (2007). Das Personenlexikon zum Dritten Reich. Wer war was vor und nach 1945. Frankfurt-am-Main: Fischer-Taschenbuch-Verlag. ISBN 978-3-596-16048-8.
- Miller, Michael D.; Schulz, Andreas (2017). Gauleiter: The Regional Leaders of the Nazi Party and Their Deputies, 1925–1945. Vol. 2 (Georg Joel – Dr. Bernhard Rust). R. James Bender Publishing. ISBN 978-1-932-97032-6.
- Miller, Michael D.; Schulz, Andreas (2015). Leaders of the Storm Troops. Vol. 1. Solihull, England: Helion & Company. ISBN 978-1-909-98287-1.
- Stockhorst, Erich (1985). 5000 Köpfe: Wer War Was im 3. Reich. Arndt. p. 66. ISBN 978-3-887-41116-9
- Stokes, Lawrence D. (1991). Biographisches Lexikon für Schleswig-Holstein und Lübeck. Vol. 9. Wachholtz. ISBN 978-3-529-02649-2.
