= List of bishops, prince-bishops and administrators of Lübeck =

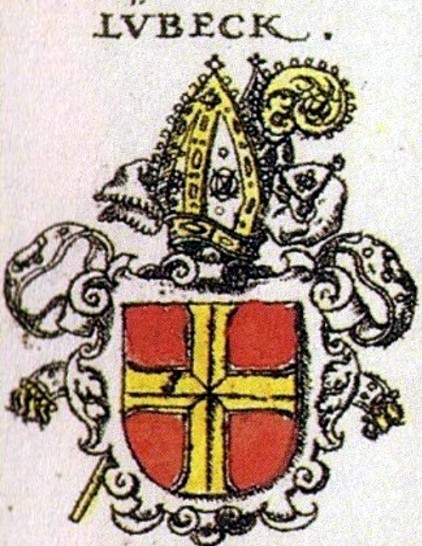
Coat-of-arms of the Prince-Bishopric of Lübeck as of 1605 in Siebmacher's Wappenbuch

The following persons were Bishops of the Diocese of Oldenburg or Lübeck (until 1180), Prince-Bishops of the diocese of Lübeck and the Prince-Bishopric of Lübeck (1180–1535), Lutheran Administrators of the Prince-Bishopric of Lübeck without pastoral function, and pastoral chairmen of the Evangelical Lutheran State Church in the Region of Lübeck.

== Titles of the incumbents of the Lübeck See ==
Not all incumbents of the Lübeck See were imperially invested princely power as Prince-Bishops and not all were papally confirmed as bishops. In 1180 part of the Lübeck diocesan territory were disentangled from the Duchy of Saxony and became an own territory of imperial immediacy called Prince-Bishopric of Lübeck, a vassal of the Holy Roman Empire. The prince-bishopric was an elective monarchy, with the monarch being the respective bishop usually elected by the Lübeck cathedral chapter, and confirmed by the Holy See, or exceptionally only appointed by the Holy See. Papally confirmed bishops were then invested by the emperor with the princely regalia, thus the title prince-bishop. However, sometimes the respective incumbent of the see never gained a papal confirmation, but was still invested the princely regalia. Also the opposite occurred with a papally confirmed bishop, never invested as prince. A number of incumbents, elected by the chapter, neither achieved papal confirmation nor imperial investiture, but as a matter of fact nevertheless de facto held the princely power. The respective incumbents of the see bore the following titles:

- Bishop of Oldenburg (Aldinborg/Starigard) until 1160
- Bishop of Lübeck 1160–1180
- Prince-Bishop of Lübeck from 1180 to 1586, which the incumbents in 1535 and between 1561 and 1586 being de facto Lutherans
- Administrator of the Prince-Bishopric of Lübeck 1586 to 1803. Either simply de facto replacing the Prince-Bishop or lacking canon-law prerequisites the incumbent of the see would officially only hold the title administrator (but nevertheless colloquially referred to as Prince-Bishop). After 1648 (Peace of Westphalia) the Lutheran administrators were generally imperially accepted as holding the princely regalia.

== Catholic Bishops of Oldenburg (Aldinborg/Starigard) till 1160 ==
Bishops	Life	Reign	Notes	Image	Coat-of-arms
Bishops of Oldenburg (Aldinborg/Starigard)
Mareus		952–968	also Marcus, Marko		
Ekward		968–974			
Wago		974–983			
Egizo		983–988			
Volkward		989–990			
Reginbert		992–1013			
Bernard		1013–1023	German: Bernhard		
Reynald		1023–1030	German: Reinhold		
Meinher		1030–1038			
Abelin		1038–1048			
Ehrenfried		1051–1066			
sede vacante		1066–1149			
Vicelinus	ca. 1090–1154	1149–1154	After Oldenburg's destruction by the Danes in 1149 the see provisionally moved to St. Peter's Church in Bosau, built in 1151		
Gerald of Oldenburg (Lübeck)		1155–1163	In 1156 Gerald started the construction of St. John's Cathedral in Oldenburg. In 1160 the see moved to Lübeck		

== Catholic Bishops of Lübeck (1160–1180) ==
Bishops	Life	Reign	Notes	Image	Coat-of-arms
Bishops of Lübeck
Gerald of Oldenburg (Lübeck)		1155–1163	In 1156 Gerald started the construction of St. John's Cathedral in Oldenburg. In 1160 the see moved to Lübeck		
Conrad of Riddagshausen as Conrad I		1164–1172	under his reign Lübeck's St. Peter's Church, the city's second main church, was established		
Henry of Brussels as Henry I		1172–1182	on his Holy Orders Duke Henry the Lion laid the cornerstone for the Lübeck Cathedral		

== Catholic Prince-Bishops of Lübeck (1180–1535) ==
Catholic Prince-Bishops of Lübeck (1180–1535)
Prince-Bishops	Life	Reign	Notes	Image	Coat-of-arms
Henry of Brussels as Henry I		1172–1182	on his Holy Orders Duke Henry the Lion laid the cornerstone for the Lübeck Cathedral		
Conrad II		1183–1184			
Theodoric I		1186–1210	German: Dietrich I.		
Bertold		1210–1230	German: Berthold		
John I		1230/1231–1247	German: Johannes I.		
Albert Suerbeer as Albert I	b. ca. 1200	1247–1253	before Archbishop of Armagh (1240–1246), Administrator of the Diocese of Chiemsee (1246–1247), later Prince-Archbishop of Riga (1253–1273)		
John of Diest as John II		1254–1259	German: Johannes II., also Dyst or Deest, d. 21 September 1259		
John of Tralau as John III		1260–1276	German: Johannes III., also Tralowe, d. 4 January 1276; Rudolph I, King of the Germans invested him with the princely regalia for the prince-bishopric, founder of the prince-episcopal castle in Eutin		
Burkhard of Serkem	b. ca. 1236	1276–1317	double tomb with Johannes Mul (1341–50)		
Heinrich Bochholt as Henry II		1317–1341			
Johannes Mul as John IV	b. ca. 1291	1341–1350	German: Johannes IV., also Muel or Muhl; double tomb with Burkhard of Serkem (1341–1350)		
Bertram Cremon		1350–1377	d. 5 January 1377		
Nicolaus Vollkrathen as Nicholas I	?–1392	1377–1379	German: Nikolaus I., also named Ziegenbock, since 1379 Bishop of Meissen		
Conrad of Geisenheim as Conrad III		1379–1386	also Gysenheim, Giesenheim, Beymondi; b. in Geisenheim, d. 30 May 1386 in Lübeck.		
John of Klenedenst as John V		1386–1387	German: Johannes V., also Clendenst, Kleendienst, or Kleindienst, b. in Lübeck, d. 3 August 1387 ibidem.		
Eberhard Attendorn as Eberhard I		1387–1399	also Everhardus de Atendorn, Evert von Attenderen, Athendorn; b. in Lübeck, d. on 21 March 1399.		
Johann Hundebeke as John VI		1399–1420	German: Johannes VI., also Dülmen, Johann Dulmen, b. in Dülmen, d. 1 January 1420 in Lübeck		
Johannes Schele as John VII	b. ca. 1385/1390	1420–1439	German: Johannes VII.		
Nicolaus Sachau as Nicholas II	b. ca. 1385	1439–1449	German: Nikolaus II., also Czachow		
Arnold Westphal	b. 1399	1450–1466			
Albert Krummendiek as Albert II	b. 1417/1418	1466–1489	also Krummediek; donated the triumphal cross created by Bernt Notke in the Lübeck Cathedral in 1477		
Thomas Grote	b. ca. 1425	1489–1492			
Dietrich Arndes as Theodoric II	b. 1442	1492–1506	also Diderich Arnd, Theodorich Arndes, Arends		
Wilhem Westphal	b. 1443	1506–1509			
Johannes Grimholt as John VIII	ca. 1450	1510–1523	German: Johannes VIII., also Grymmolt or Grymmelt		
Heinrich Bockholt as Henry III	b. 1463	1523–1535	also Bokholt, Bokhold, Buchholtz; since 1531 the Free City of Lübeck adopted Lutheranism and inhibited Catholic pastoring in its part of the Lübeck diocese		

== Catholic and Lutheran Prince-Bishops of Lübeck (1535–1586) ==
Catholic and Lutheran Prince-Bishops of Lübeck (1535–1586)
Prince-Bishops	Life	Reign	Notes	Image	Coat-of-arms
Detlev von Reventlow	b. ca. 1485	1535–1535	also Ditlev; first Lutheran prince-bishop, started the Protestant Reformation in the diocese of Lübeck		
Balthasar Rantzau	ca. 1497	1536–1547	papally confirmed		
Jodokus Hodfilter	b. 1500	1547–1551	also Hodefilter, papally confirmed		
Theodor von Rheden as Theodoric III	b. 1492–1556	1551–1554	also Theodorich, Dietrich von Reden, papally confirmed, resigned		
sede vacante		1554–1556			
Andreas von Barby	b. 1508	1556–1559	not papally confirmed		
Johannes Tiedemann as John IX		1559–1561	German: Johannes IX, papally confirmed, double epitaph with his brothers and capitular canon in Lübeck and Ratzeburg Christopher Tiedemann (d. 1561)		
Eberhard von Holle as Eberhard II	b. 1531/1532	1561–1586	papally confirmed; completed the Protestant Reformation in the prince-bishopric proper		

== Lutheran Administrators of the Prince-Bishopric (1586–1803) ==
Administrators of the Prince-Bishopric of Lübeck
Administrators	Life	Reign	Notes	Image	Coat-of-arms
John Adolf, Duke of Holstein-Gottorp	1575–1616	1586–1607	also Administrator of the Prince-Archbishopric of Bremen (1589–1596) and co-ruling Duke of Holstein and of Schleswig (1590–1616)		
John Frederick of Holstein-Gottorp	b. 1579	1607–1634	also administrator of the Prince-Archbishopric of Bremen (1596–1634) and the Prince-Bishopric of Verden (1631–1634)		
John X of Schleswig-Holstein-Gottorp	b. 1606	1634–1655	German: Hans		
Christian Albert, Duke of Holstein-Gottorp	1641–1695	1655–1666	also co-ruling Duke of Holstein and Schleswig (1659–1695)		
August Frederick of Holstein-Gottorp	b. 1646	1666–1705			
Christian August of Holstein-Gottorp	b. 1673	1705–1726			
Charles August of Holstein-Gottorp	b. 1706	1726–1727			
Adolf Frederick of Holstein-Gottorp	1710–1771	1727–1750	King of Sweden since 1751		
Frederick August I, Duke of Oldenburg	b. 1711	1750–1785	by the Treaty of Tsarskoye Selo in 1773 also ruling the Duchy of Oldenburg		
Peter Frederick Louis, Duke of Holstein-Gottorp	1755–1829	1785–1803	in 1803 secularised to Principality of Lübeck within the Duchy of Oldenburg; also Duke of Oldenburg (1823–1829)		

== Chairperson of the Evangelical Lutheran State Church of Lübeck (Eutin) (1921–77) ==
Duke Frederick August and his successors served as summus episcopus of the Lutheran church of the Duchy of Oldenburg, including the Principality of Lübeck. After the abdication of the Duke in 1918 the Lutheran church in the principality seceded as Evangelical Lutheran State Church of the Region of Lübeck within the Free State of Oldenburg with effect of 19 May 1921.
Pastoral chairperson of the Evangelical Lutheran State Church of the Region of Lübeck (Eutin)
Land Provosts/Bishops	Life	Term	Notes	Image	Coat-of-arms
Paul Rahtgens	1867–1929	1921–1929	titled Superintendent and later Land Provost, the new office was established after summepiscopacy (monarchic governorate of the Lutheran church) ended with the abdication of Oldenburg's monarchs		
Wilhelm Kieckbusch	1891–1987	1930–1978	titled Land Provost (1930–61), thereafter Bishop		
On 1 January 1978 the Evangelical Lutheran State Church merged with other neighbouring Landeskirchen in the new North Elbian Evangelical Lutheran Church, which also staffed a position titled Bishop of Lübeck and Holstein between 1978 and 2008.

== Sources ==
- Friedrich Wilhelm Ebeling, Die deutschen Bischöfe bis zum Ende des sechzehnten Jahrhunderts - Biographisch, literarisch, historisch und kirchenstatistisch dargestellt, vol. 1, Leipzig 1858, S. 562-589.
- Ernst Friedrich Mooyer, Verzeichnisse der deutschen Bischöfe seit dem Jahre 800 nach Chr. Geb., Minden 1854, S. 56-57.
- Hermann Grote, Stammtafeln, Leipzig 1877
