= Heinrich Bockholt =

Catholic Prince-Bishop of Lübeck

The Most Reverend Heinrich III Bockholt
- Prince-Bishop of Lübeck
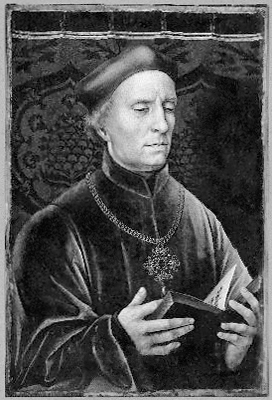
- Heinrich III Bockholt, Portrait by Jacob van Utrecht (1523)
- Church: Roman Catholic
- Diocese: Diocese of Lübeck
- Elected: 19 June 1523
- Term ended: 15 March 1535
- Predecessor: Johannes Grimholt
- Successor: Detlev von Reventlow

Orders
- Consecration: 6 March 1524 by Gottschalk von Ahlefeldt

Personal details
- Born: c. 1463; Hamburg
- Died: 15 March 1535; Hamburg

Heinrich Bockholt (also: Bokholt, Bokhold, Buchholtz; c. 1463 – 15 March 1535) known as Heinrich III, was a Catholic Prince-Bishop of Lübeck.

== Life ==
Bockholt was born around 1463 in Hamburg, the son of the Hamburg tailor and councilor Eberhard (Ewert) Bockholt and his wife Anna, a daughter of Heinrich Arnd († 1467). He was thus a nephew of Dietrich II Arndes, who should have exerted no insignificant influence on him. His parents made sure that he got a good basic education. He studied at the University of Rostock in 1478, where he earned his bachelor's degree in the winter semester of 1479/80 and his master's degree in the seven liberal arts in 1481/82. Pursuing a law degree, he later went to the University of Cologne and University of Cologne and from there to Italy.

Financially secured by a diaconate in Udine, one finds him in 1487 at the University of Bologna. In Italy, he also appears to have obtained a Doctor of both laws degree. After spending some time in Rome, he became a member of the papal court and a protonotary. Soon after he returned to Germany. In 1493, he served as vicar at Lübeck Cathedral. He also had other ecclesiastical benefices as provost in Ratzeburg, as dean in Hildesheim, and as vicar in Hamburg, as Archdeacon in Stapel, and acquired as a cathedral provost in Lübeck in 1508.

On 19 June 1523, he was elected bishop by the Lübeck cathedral chapter. After receiving his papal confirmation on 13 August 1523, he was installed on 6 March 1524. In the year he took office, the influence of the Reformation began to increase in his diocese. As a vehement representative of the Catholic Church, he attempted to suppress the burgeoning Lutheran doctrines, but was unsuccessful in his attempts, which was also due to the tense situation between the council, citizens and cathedral chapter. After the council and citizens had agreed in 1531 to introduce Johannes Bugenhagen's evangelical Lübeck church order, the bishop increasingly lost influence in Lübeck and withdrew completely to Eutin. When troops from Lübeck under Marx Meyer Eutin attacked in connection with the Count's Feud at the end of May 1534, he fled to Hamburg, where he died a year later of poisoning.

Books from his estate came with the cathedral library to the city library (Lübeck). His copy by Johannes de Imola: Lectura in tertium librum Decretalium, Venice: Bernardinus Stagninus 1500, which he had acquired in Rome in 1511, came to the Soviet Union as looted art after being evacuated during World War II and is now in the Tomsk University Library.

=== Portraits ===
From Heinrich Bockholt exist two portrait paintings from 1523/24 that Max J. Friedländer attributed to Jacob van Utrecht. One of them, which was in the Paris art trade in 1939, ended up in Hermann Göring's collection and was restituted to France after 1945. It then went to the Nureyev Collection and was auctioned at Christie's in New York in 1995.

== Literature ==
- Wilhelm Jannasch (1969). "Heinrich III. Bockholt". Neue Deutsche Biographie (in German). Vol. 8. Berlin: Duncker & Humblot. pp. 368–368. (full text online).

Heinrich Bockholt
Catholic Church titles
Regnal titles
Preceded by Johannes Grimholt	Prince-Bishop of Lübeck; 1523–1535	Succeeded by Detlev von Reventlow
