= Chronica Slavorum =

Medieval chronicle by Helmold

Chronica Slavorum, original title: Chronica Sclavorum
- Chronicle of the Slavs
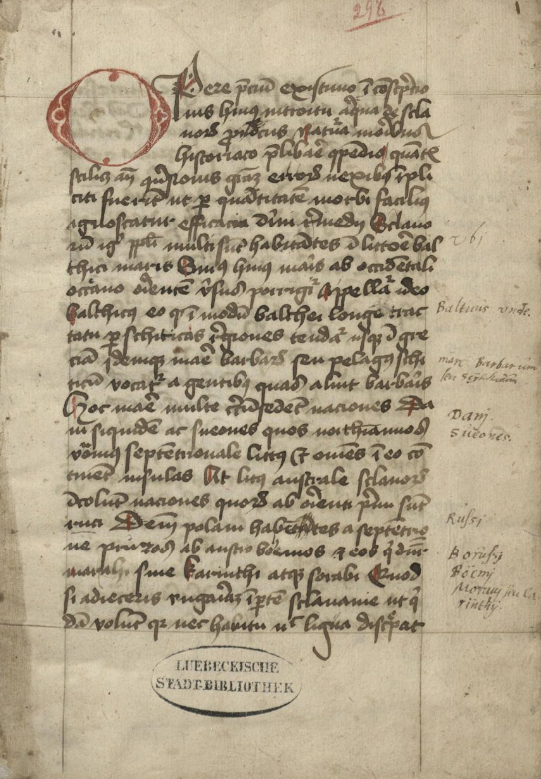
- First page of the mid-15th century Lübeck manuscript
- Language: Latin
- Date: 1168–1169
- Genre: History

The Chronica Sclavorum or Chronicle of the Slavs is a medieval chronicle which recounts the pre-Christian culture and religion of the Polabian Slavs, written by Helmold of Bosau (c. 1120 – after 1177), a Saxon priest and historian. It describes events related to northwest Slavic tribes known as the Wends up to 1171.

It is a continuation of Adam of Bremen's Deeds of Bishops of the Hamburg Church and was in turn continued by Arnold of Lübeck's Chronica Slavorum.

== See also ==
- Polabian Slavs

== Sources ==
- Lappenbergius, Johannes Martinus; Pertz, Georgius Heinricus, eds. (1868). Arnoldi Chronica Slavorum. Hannoverae: Impensis Bibliopolii Hahniani.
- Laurent, Johann Christian Mauritz, ed. (1852). Helmolds Chronik der Slaven. Berlin: Franz Duncker.
  - Laurent, Johann Christian Mauritz, ed. (1888) [1852]. Helmolds Chronik der Slaven (2nd ed.). Leipzig: Dyksche Buchhandlung.
- Rossignol, Sébastien (2014). "Bilingualism in Medieval Europe: Germans and Slavs in Helmold of Bosau's Chronicle". Central European History. 47 (3): 523–543.
- Stoob, Heinz, ed. (1963). Helmold von Bosau: Slawenchronik. Darmstadt: Wissenschaftliche Buchgesellschaft.
  - Stoob, Heinz, ed. (2002) [1963]. Helmold von Bosau: Slawenchronik (6th ed.). Darmstadt: Wissenschaftliche Buchgesellschaft.
