= Balthasar Rantzau =

Bishop of Lubeck (1497–1547)

The Most Reverend Balthasar Rantzau
- Prince-Bishop of Lübeck
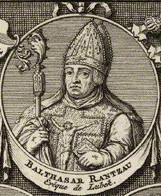
- Church: Roman Catholic
- Diocese: Diocese of Lübeck
- In office: 1536–1547
- Predecessor: Detlev von Reventlow
- Successor: Jodokus Hodfilter

Personal details
- Born: c. 1497 possibly Wartenfels Castle
- Died: 23 May 1547; Stavenow Castle
- Buried: Karstädt
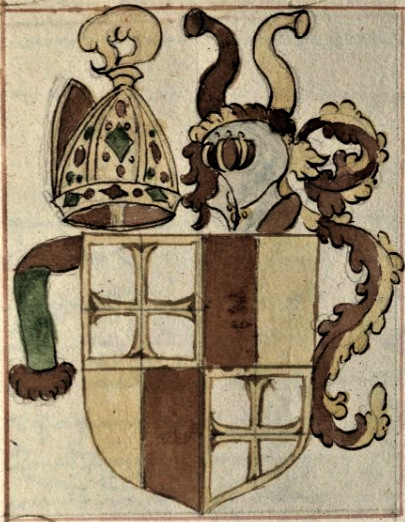
- Coat of arms

Balthasar Rantzau (c. 1497 – 23 May 1547 probably at Wartenfels Castle in Lusatia) was a Prince-Bishop of the Diocese of Lübeck. He became known for his tragic end as a kidnapping victim.

== Family ==
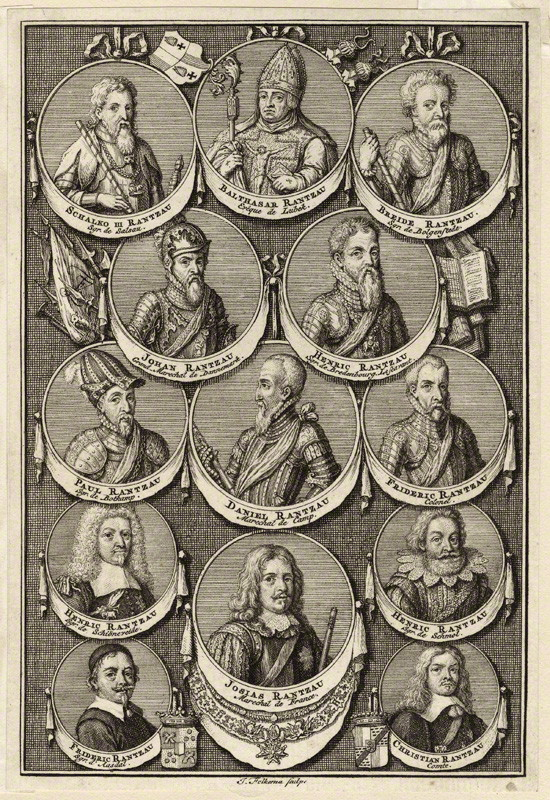
Johannes Jakosbz Folkema: Balthasar Rantzau (above) as bishop with other members of the Rantzau family

Balthasar Rantzau came from the Holstein noble family Rantzau. He was the son of the bailiff Hans Rantzau (1452–1522) on Gut Neuhaus and Schmoel in today's Plön district and Margarethe Brockdorff (1477–19 August 1547). His eldest brother was Melchior Rantzau (around 1496–1539), the most important statesman for foreign and financial policy in the duchies of Schleswig and Holstein. Five other brothers of his also held important positions in the government of the duchies: Heinrich (or Henrik) (1501–1561) and Sievert († 1576) were ducal councilors and bailiffs, Jasper (or Caspar) († 1562) royal councilor and bailiff, Breide († 1562) royal governor of the duchies and Otto († 1585) provost of Uetersen monastery. Together the family had rich land holdings in Holstein.

== Life ==
Presumably the second son destined for the ecclesiastical office, Balthasar Rantzau received minor orders as a youth. As early as 1511, Duke Friedrich presented him to the cathedral chapter in Schleswig as cathedral provost. He never stayed there, however, and began studying at the University of Rostock together with Melchior in 1514. In 1521 he received a prebend in Lübeck, later also in Ratzeburg, without settling there, as the rules actually stipulated.

=== Bishop ===
In 1536, after the sudden death of Detlev von Reventlow, the first evangelical bishop of Lübeck, he was elected his successor. Although the cathedral chapter had refused, King Christian III demanded he be allowed to appoint the bishop, but the choice was probably made to please the king, because the relationship between Lübeck and Denmark was not the best after the feud of the counts. Little is known about Rantzau's attitude towards the Reformation. At the office he was only interested in the source of the money. He repeatedly postponed the ordination of priests and bishops, which would actually have been necessary for this. It probably didn't happen at all. He also refused to take the oath to the cathedral chapters until 1539. And instead of living on the bishopric in Eutin, he preferred to live on the Gut Neuhaus family estate, which he had inherited together with his brother Sievert.

=== Kidnapping and death ===
Balthasar Rantzau was kidnapped together with a noble boy at the beginning of August 1545 from his episcopal estate Kaltenhof on the Trave in the area of Alt-Lübeck not far from today's Bad Schwartau. The culprit was the Mecklenburg nobleman Martin von Waldenfels, owner of Gut Gorlosen, who tried in this way to recover outstanding pay payments, which amounted to 1400 guilders, from King Christian III to blackmail from Denmark. Waldenfels, a mercenary leader in his 60s and heavily indebted, had called for them several times in recent years. In 1543 he came to Kiel in the entourage of Prince Magnus of Mecklenburg for his marriage to Elisabeth, one of the king's sisters, where he repeated his claim. However, he was put off by Johann Rantzau for arbitration. Eventually, Governor Breide Rantzau, the bishop's brother, nullified the guilt in the king's name because Waldenfels could produce no written contract for the alleged enlistment of horsemen, and threatened him with a lawsuit for his "lies". As a result, Waldenfels sent the king a feud letter on 10 August 1545, in which he declared that he had kidnapped Rantzau. The ransom demanded was 20,000 guilders, about a third of Denmark's annual government spending.

The king was not willing – and probably not able – to pay the ransom, the Rantzau brothers saw the kidnapping as a matter of state and the cathedral chapter only wanted to participate if the others paid. The negotiations – a longer exchange of letters, which also contains letters from the abductees from the first months of imprisonment, have been preserved – therefore dragged on at the highest level with the involvement of the Holy Roman Empire. Waldenfels and his assistants were accused of breaching the peace and persecuted as robbers throughout the empire. However, since only the approximate whereabouts of the abductee and the kidnapper were known, intermediaries were used to negotiate with the princes of Mecklenburg and Brandenburg, including the chancellor Andreas von Barby, who was to become Rantzau's successor in 1556. Even Balthasar's elderly mother traveled to Mecklenburg in 1546 in hopes of freeing her son. Elector Joachim von Brandenburg summoned several nobles, including two von Bredow brothers, who were accused of being involved in the kidnapping, but even this leverage did not persuade Waldenfels to release his prisoner. Bishop Balthasar, whose health was increasingly failing, was dragged from one castle to another. In addition to the ransom, Waldenfels repeatedly demanded reimbursement of the expenses for his proper maintenance. In the end, Breide Rantzau took matters into his own hands and in the spring of 1547, together with a group of horsemen, searched an estate in the Mark, where according to witnesses Balthasar Rantzau was staying. Although he did not find his brother, he robbed the wedding of one of the Bredow brothers and in turn kidnapped some nobles. In response to the complaint from the Knights of Brandenburg, the Danish king explained the whole case in detail. Waldenfels, who meanwhile fought for Moritz of Saxony in the Schmalkaldic War, met Elector Joachim in Berlin. However, he claimed not to be able to dispose of the prisoner. It is possible that Rantzau had already died by this time, as his brother assumed due to the lack of letters for a long time. The historian Wolfgang Prange assumes that he died at Stavenow Castle and was buried in Blüthen. When an imperial mandate threatened Waldenfels with the imperial ban in the summer of 1547 if he did not immediately release the bishop and renounce the feud, Waldenfels only agreed to negotiations if Denmark dropped the lawsuit against him, to which Christian III. wasn't ready. However, since Waldenfels was under Moritz von Sachsen's personal protection, Elector Joachim opened the trial at the end of 1548 only against the Bredows and a few other suspects. It became clear that the bishop was already dead. Waldenfels protested in writing against the allegation of the noble boy, who had since been freed, of having murdered Rantzau. He was ostracized and his goods awarded to King Christian, which led to new disputes with the Dukes of Mecklenburg. Waldenfels himself remained undamaged in Saxon service.

After Rantzau's kidnapping, the cathedral chapter argued with the Rantzau brothers about the bishop's estates, which they initially refused to hand over. Only after his death was officially confirmed in 1548 did they hand over the pen administration, but kept half the inventory and quite a bit of money. The cathedral chapter therefore refused to comply with the king's wish and to elect another nobleman as bishop.

== Literature ==
- Wilhelm Mantel (1875). "Balthasar (Rantzau)". Allgemeine Deutsche Biographie (in German). Vol. 2. Leipzig: Duncker & Humblot. p. 27.
- Behrmann: Nachrichten über die Entführung des Bischofs von Lübeck Balthasar Ranzaus durch Martin von Waldenfels im Jahre 1545 nebst deren weitern Folgen, in Michelsen/Asmussen: Archiv für Staats- und Kirchengeschichte der Herzogthümer Schleswig, Holstein, Lauenburg. Band II., S. 301 ff.
- Poul Colding: En kidnappingaffære i 16. arhundrede, in: Historie/Jyske Samlinger, Bind Ny række, 9 (1970–1972) 4, S. 574–612.
- Dieter Lohmeier: Das „Rantzauische" Zeitalter der schleswig-holsteinischen Geschichte (pdf, retrieved 14 June 2014).
- Wolfgang Prange: Rantzau, Balthasar. In: Olaf Klose, Eva Rudolph (Hrsg.): Schleswig-Holsteinisches Biographisches Lexikon. Bd. 4. Karl Wachholtz Verlag, Neumünster 1976, S. 191f.

Balthasar Rantzau
Catholic Church titles
Regnal titles
Preceded by Detlev von Reventlow	Prince-Bishop of Lübeck; 1536–1547	Succeeded by Jodokus Hodfilter
