= Hans Kemmer =

German painter

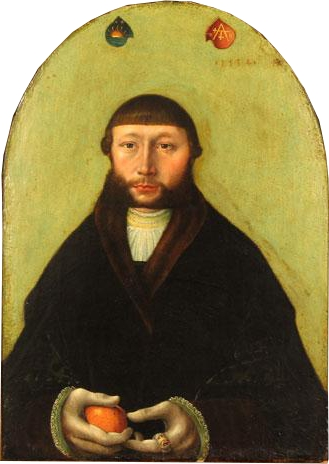
Portrait of the merchant Hans Sonnenschein by Hans Kemmer

Hans Kemmer (sometimes Johann Kemmer, fl. c. 1495–1561) was a German Northern Renaissance painter, active in Lübeck.

== Life and works ==
Hans Kemmer came from Lübeck and was educated by Lucas Cranach the Elder in Wittenberg. In 1522 he returned to his native city and appears to have worked there for the duration of his life. In 1528 he is recorded as having bought a house on Königsstrasse street in Lübeck.

The known executed work by Hans Kemmer includes 16 panel paintings, 1 mural, 7 portraits, and 3 drawings or prints; in addition, 18 other works of art have been accredited to him. His masterpiece, an altarpiece dedicated to Saint Olaf, was executed for St. Mary's Church in Lübeck. It was destroyed during World War II.
