= Johann Martin Lappenberg =

German diplomat and historian (1794–1865)

Johann Martin Lappenberg (July 30, 1794 – November 28, 1865) was a German diplomat, groundbreaking medievalist, and historian with a focus on the early Holy Roman Empire, the Hanseatic League, and Saxon England.

== Biography ==
He was born at Hamburg, where his father, Valentin Anton Lappenberg (1759–1819), held an official position. He attended the Johanneum and the Akademisches Gymnasium of Hamburg. Like his father he studied medicine, but afterwards history, at the University of Edinburgh. He continued to study history in London, at Frederick William University of Berlin and at Göttingen, where he graduated as doctor of laws in 1816. In 1820 he was sent by the Hamburg senate as Minister Resident to the Prussian court in Berlin. In 1823 he became keeper of the Hamburg archives. In this office, he had the fullest opportunities for the laborious and critical research work upon which rests his reputation. He was in this office until 1863, when a serious eye problem compelled him to resign. In 1850 he represented Hamburg in the German parliament at Frankfurt, and he died at Hamburg.

== Works ==
Lappenberg's most important work is his Geschichte von England, which deals with the history of England from the earliest times to 1154. This work was published in two volumes at Hamburg in 1834–1837. It has been translated into English by Benjamin Thorpe as History of England under the Anglo-Saxon Kings (1845), and History of England under the Norman Kings (Oxford, 1857), and was continued in three additional volumes from 1154 to 1509 by R. Pauli.

For the Monumenta Germaniae historica he edited the Chronicon of Thietmar of Merseburg, the Gesta Hammenburgensis ecclesiae pontificum of Adam of Bremen and the Chronica Slavorum of Helmold, with its continuation by Arnold of Lübeck. Lappenberg, who was a member of numerous learned societies in Europe, wrote many other historical works.

These other works deal mainly with the history of Hamburg, particularly during the era of the Hanseatic League, and include:

- Hamburgische Chroniken in niedersächsischer Sprache (Hamburg: Perthes & Mauke, 1852–1861; reprint Niederwalluf: Sändig, 1971, ISBN 3-500-23100-4)
- Geschichtsquellen des Erzstiftes und der Stadt Bremen (Bremen: Heyse, 1841; reprint Aalen: Scientia-Verlag, 1967)
- Hamburgisches Urkundenbuch (Hamburg: Perthes, Besser & Mauke, 1842)
- Urkundliche Geschichte des Hansischen Stahlhofes zu London (Hamburg: Langhoff, 1851; reprint Osnabrück: Zeller, 1967)
- Hamburgische Rechtsalterthümer (Hamburg: Meissner, 1845)
- Urkundliche Geschichte des Ursprunges der deutschen Hanse (Hamburg, 1830), as editor, continuation of the work of GF Sartorius.
