= Eberhard von Holle =

Bishop of Lübeck

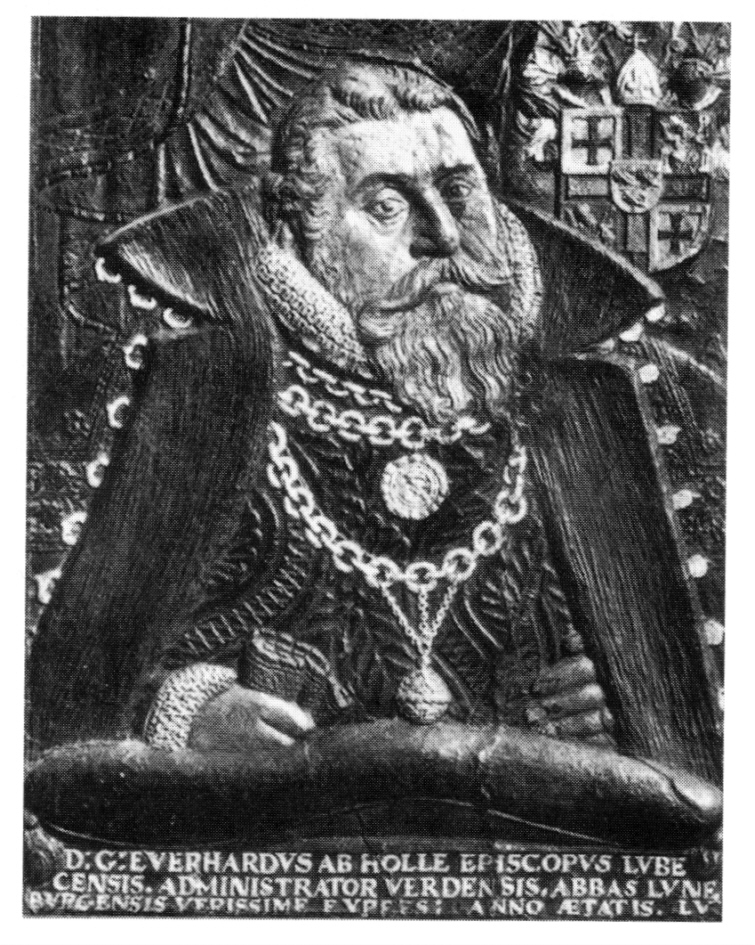
Everhard Von Holle

Eberhard von Holle (born 1531/32 in Uchte; died 5 July 1586 in Lübeck) was bishop of Lübeck from 1561, also abbot of the Michaelis monastery in Lüneburg and administrator of the diocese of Verden from 1564. And was one of the bishops who signed the Book of Concord, and supported the reformation.

On 16 May 1561, at the instigation of the Holstein nobility and the King of Denmark, he was appointed by the cathedral chapter of the diocese of Lübeck to be the coadjutor of Bishop Johannes Tiedemann. Only two months later, after Tiedemann's death, he succeeded him as bishop. Eberhard von Holle's Lutheran position was far from clear and the research as a diplomat and an opportunist indicates even more in 1562 to achieve the papal confirmation of his choice after he led the Emperor by the investiture with the regalia. With the introduction of the Reformation in the city of Lübeck in 1531 and in the Holstein areas he no longer had any spiritual power, but was still an imperial prince and sovereign in the Lübeck monastery.

He died as a result of a severe fall and was buried in the church of St. Michaelis. In April 1965 a monument to him was placed in the entrance hall of the cathedral grammar school when it was redesigned.
