= Arnold of Lübeck =

Benedictine chronicler

Arnold of Lübeck (died on 27 June, 1211–1214) was a Benedictine abbot, a chronicler, and advocate of the papal cause in the Hohenstaufen conflict. He was a monk at St. Ägidien monastery in Braunschweig, then from 1177 the first abbot of the newly founded St. John's monastery in Lübeck. As an abbot, he secured four papal privileges for his monastery, first from pope Celestine III in 1191, and later in 1193-1195 he also served as a papal delegate who judged a disputed election in the Bishopric of Schwerin. He was the author of the Chronica Slavorum, covering historical events up to 1209. He also composed a Latin translation of The Deeds of Gregory the Sinner, a German poem written by Hartmann von Aue. Arnold dedicated his translation to a prominent noble William of Lunenburg, the son of Saxon duke Henry the Lion.

== Sources ==
- Lappenbergius, Johannes Martinus; Pertz, Georgius Heinricus, eds. (1868). Arnoldi Chronica Slavorum. Hannoverae: Impensis Bibliopolii Hahniani.
- Lappenbergius, Johannes Martinus; Pertz, Georgius Heinricus, eds. (1869). "Arnoldi abbatis Lubecensis Chronica". Monumenta Germaniae Historica: Scriptores. Vol. 21. Hannoverae: Impensis Bibliopolii Auici Hahniani. pp. 100–250.
- Loud, Graham A., ed. (2019). The Chronicle of Arnold of Lübeck. London and New York: Routledge.
