= Vicelinus =

German bishop (1086–1154)

Saint Vicelinus
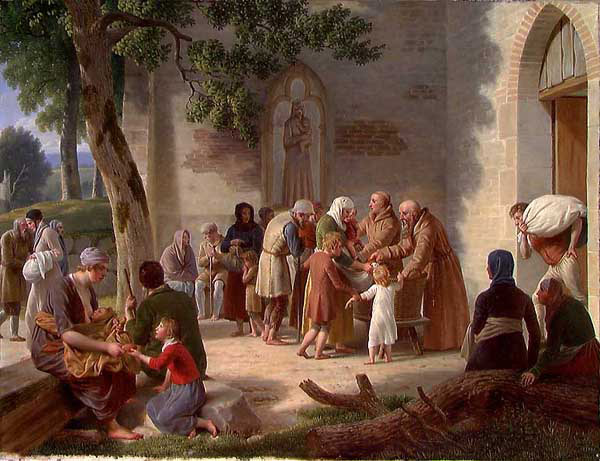
- Vicelinus distributes food to the needy. Oil painting by Christoffer Wilhelm Eckersberg, 1812

Apostle of Holstein and Bishop of Oldenburg
- Born: 1086; Hamelin, Lower Saxony, Germany
- Died: 12 December 1154 (aged 67–68); Neumünster, Schleswig-Holstein, Germany
- Venerated in: Catholic Church
- Major shrine: Augustine Collegiate Church (orig. Neumünster), Bordesholm (as of 1330), Germany
- Feast: 12 December
- Attributes: Church resting on his left arm

Vicelinus (also Vicelin, German: Vizelin; 1086 – 12 December 1154) was a German bishop of Oldenburg in Holstein who was considered the apostle of Holstein. He was also known as Apostle of Obodriten, of the Wends, Vicelinus, Vincelin, Vizelin, Wissel, Witzel.

== Life ==
Vicelinus was born in Hamelin around 1086. Orphaned at an early age, he was raised by his uncle Ludolf, a priest in a neighboring village. He left for Paderborn, where he enjoyed the home and instructions of Hartmann, and soon surpassed his companions and assisted in the management of the cathedral school.

Vicelinus was called to Bremen to act as teacher and principal of the school, and was offered a canonry by Archbishop Frederick of the Archbishopric of Hamburg-Bremen. In 1122, he may have gone to Laon to complete his studies under Abelard. In 1126, Vicelinus decided to travel to Magdeburg, in order to see Norbert of Xanten, who at that time was the archbishop. He hoped that Norbert would ordain him a priest and he could begin missionary work among the Slavs. For one reason or another this plan failed and so Vicelinus returned to Bremen, where Bishop Albero ordained him. Hamburg-Bremen's Archbishop Adalbero sent him among the Polabian Slavs, and in the fall of 1126 Henry, Prince of the Obotrites, gave him a church in Liubice, near the site of the later Lübeck. Upon the death of Henry (22 March 1127), Vicelinus returned to Bremen, and was appointed pastor at Wippenthorp. This gave him an opportunity to work among the Wagrians and neighbouring Obotrites.

Vicelinus's preaching gathered crowds of eager listeners, and many priests helped him in founding the new monastery (Latin: novum monasterium) in 1127, which became eponymous for Wippenthorp as Neumünster. This monastery of Canons Regular followed the Rule of St. Augustine, and was endowed by the archbishop. Wars among the tribes in 1137 caused the missionaries to abandon their labours for two years. Vicelinus sent two priests to Liubice, but with little success. In 1134, he founded a second canonry at Segeberg.

Several years later, Vicelinus established a house at Hogersdorf. In Harsefeld, Hamburg-Bremen's Archbishop Hartwig I made him Bishop of Starigard (or Aldinborg by the Saxons, today's Oldenburg) in 1149. There he did much for the spiritual and temporal welfare of his diocese. In 1152, he was struck by paralysis and lingered amid much suffering for two years before dying in Neumünster.

== Veneration ==
In 1330, the Augustine canon-law college moved to Bordesholm, and in 1332, his body was transferred there and buried before the main altar. In 1874, the small Catholic parish at Hamelin had his picture engraved on a new bell. He is usually represented with a church resting on his left arm; his feast is celebrated on 12 December.

Vicelinus Born: 1086 in Hamelin Died: 12 December 1154 in Neumünster
Catholic Church titles
Vacant Title last held by Ehrenfried sede vacante 1066–1149	Bishop of Oldenburg in Holstein; 1149–1154	Succeeded by Gerald of Oldenburg
