= Prince-Bishopric of Lübeck =

State of the Holy Roman Empire (1180–1803)

Prince-Bishopric of Lübeck Hochstift Lübeck (German)
- 1180–1803
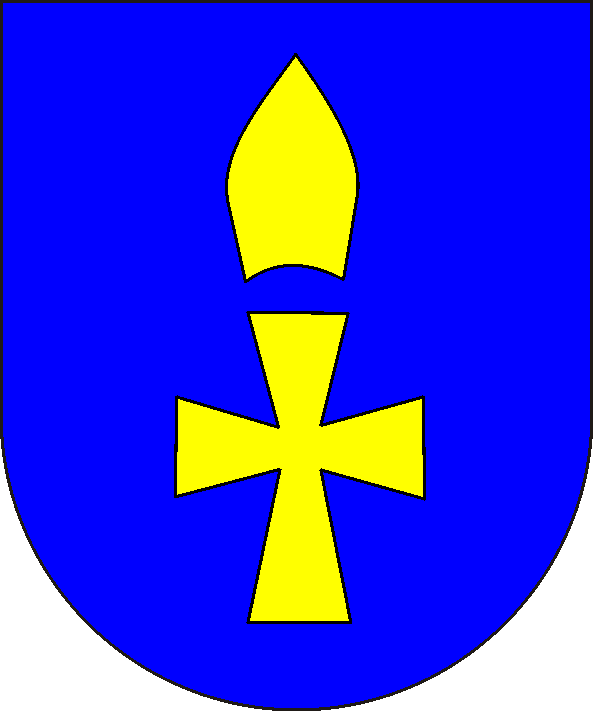
- Coat of arms

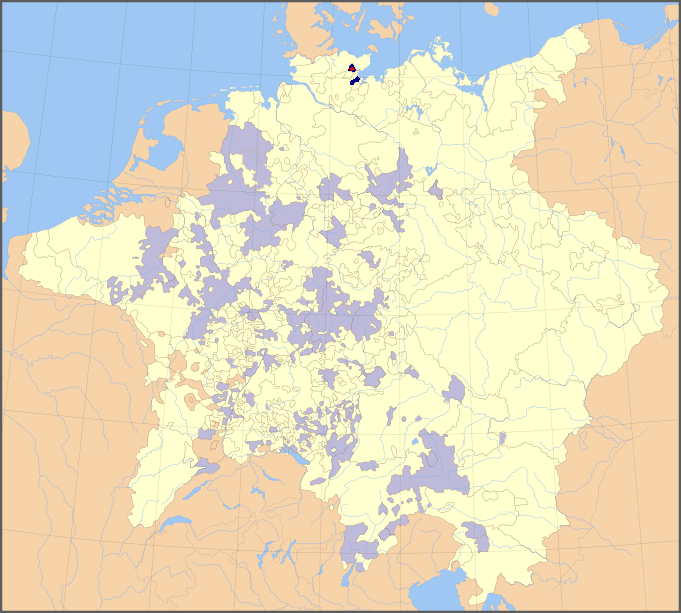
- Prince-Bishopric of Lübeck (Dark blue) with in the Holy Roman Empire (as of 1648), the episcopal residence in Eutin shown by a red spot (other prince-bishoprics in light blue)
- Status: Prince-Bishopric
- Capital: Lübeck (seat of the chapter), Eutin (prince-episcopal residence) since 1309
- Common languages: Holsatian
- Historical era: Middle Ages
  - Diocese reestablished at Oldenburg: 1149
  - Moved to Lübeck: 1180
  - Reichsfreiheit: 1180
  - Joined Lower Saxon Circle: 1500
  - Protestant Reformation: 1535
  - Secularized to Duchy of Oldenburg: 1803
Preceded by	Succeeded by
Duchy of Saxony	Duchy of Oldenburg

The Prince-Bishopric of Lübeck, (German: Hochstift Lübeck; Fürstbistum Lübeck; Bistum Lübeck) was an ecclesiastical principality of the Holy Roman Empire until 1803. Originally ruled by Roman-Catholic bishops, after 1586 it was ruled by lay administrators and bishops who were members of the Protestant Holstein-Gottorp line of the House of Oldenburg. The prince-bishops had seat and vote on the Ecclesiastical Bench of the College of Ruling Princes of the Imperial Diet.

The Prince-Bishopric of Lübeck, a secular state, should not be confused with the Diocese of Lübeck, which was larger and over which the bishop exercised only pastoral authority.

== History ==
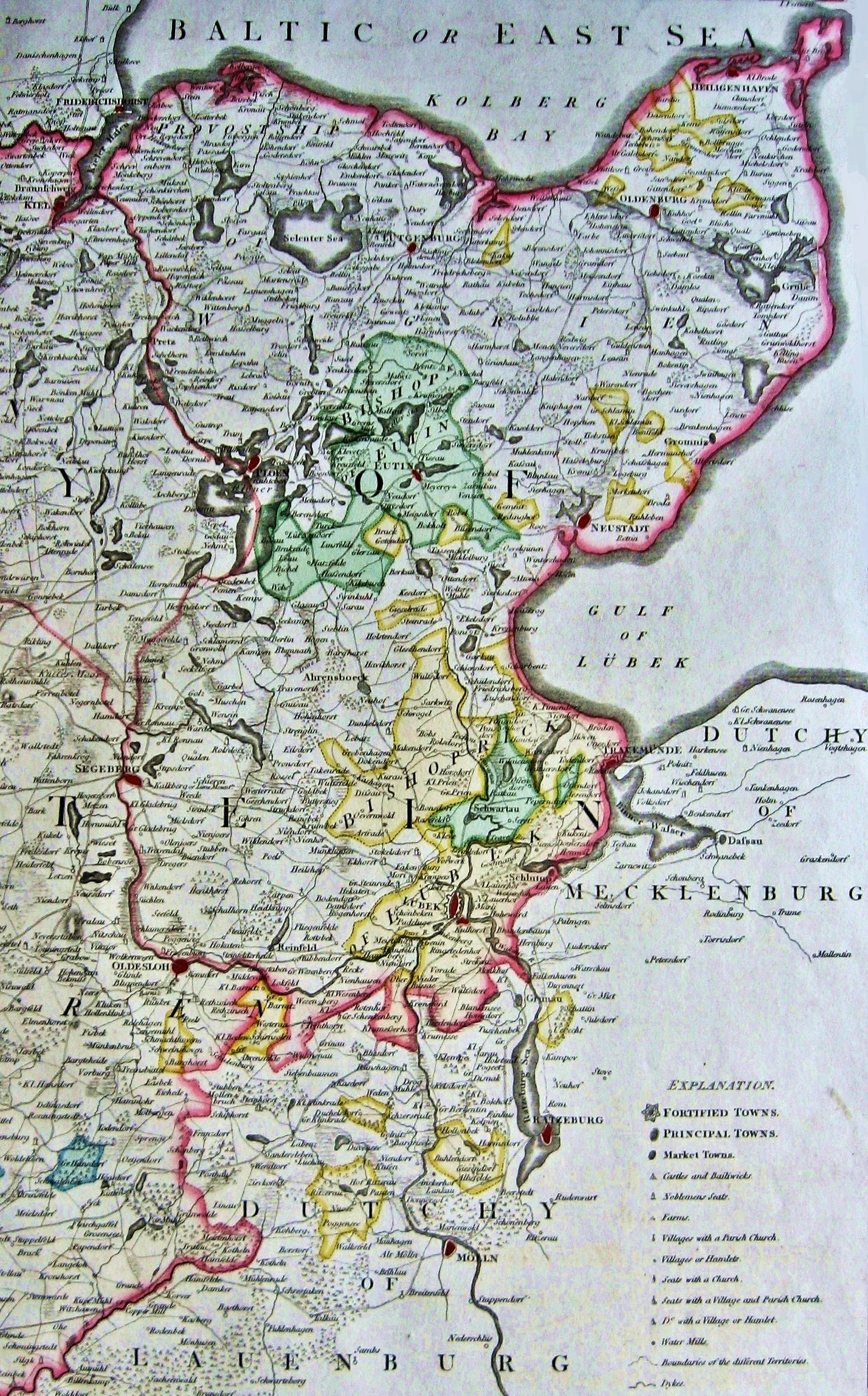
Territory of the Prince-Bishopric of Lübeck

The original diocese was founded about 970 by Emperor Otto I in the Billung March at Oldenburg in Holstein (Aldinborg or Starigard), the former capital of the pagan Wagri tribe. Oldenburg was then a suffragan diocese of the Archbishopric of Bremen, meant to missionize the Obotrites. However, in the course of the 983 Slavic uprising (see Lutici), the Wagri shook off Imperial supremacy and in 1038, the bishops were barred from entering their diocese. In 1052, the dioceses of Ratzeburg and Schwerin were split off from Oldenburg and no bishop was appointed after 1066.

After the Saxon count Henry of Badewide had campaigned in the Wagrian lands east of the Limes Saxoniae in 1138/39, a new Bishop of Oldenburg, Vicelinus, was appointed in 1149. Duke Henry the Lion of Saxony moved the seat of the diocese from Oldenburg to Lübeck in 1160. When the Duchy of Saxony was dissolved with Henry's deposition in 1180, the Bishopric gained the status of Imperial State (reichsunmittelbar). Quarrels arose after the City of Lübeck gained imperial immediacy in 1226 and as the territory of the state was centered on Eutin, the town in 1309 became the residence of the bishops.

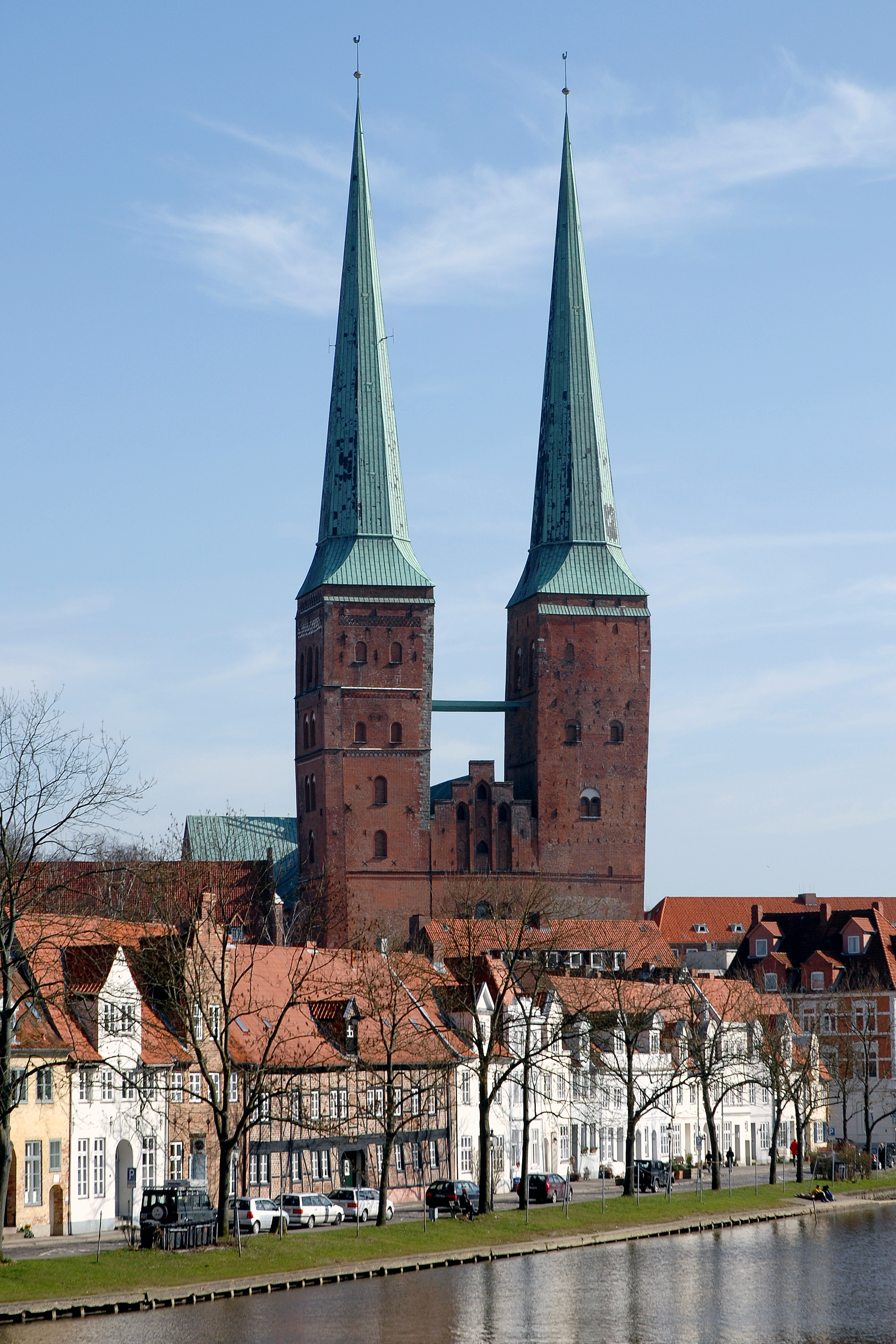
Lübeck Cathedral

The Bishopric did not attempt to fight the Protestant Reformation. In 1531 the Free City of Lübeck, instanced by Johannes Bugenhagen, had turned Protestant, further inhibiting Catholic pastoring in the part of the Lübeck diocese under city rule. And in 1535 the Lübeck cathedral chapter and subsequently all its diocesan territories adopted the Lutheran confession. The Prince-Bishop was elected by the chapter; since 1586, all administrators of the prince-bishopric were members of the Holstein-Gottorp line of the House of Oldenburg. After the 1648 Peace of Westphalia, Lübeck was one of only two Protestant prince-bishoprics in the Empire (together with Osnabrück, which however was alternately led by Protestant and Catholic bishops).

== Principality and Region of Lübeck ==
With the Reichsdeputationshauptschluss of 1803, the Prince-Bishopric was mediatized. It became the Principality of Lübeck and was given to the Duchy of Oldenburg, since the last prince-bishop (Peter I of Holstein-Gottorp) was also prince regent of Oldenburg. In 1803 the principality comprised 9.5 German square miles (Note: One German sq. mile (Quadratmeile) = 21.25 Eng. sq. miles or 55.05 km^{2}.) with 22,000 inhabitants. Its capital was Eutin.

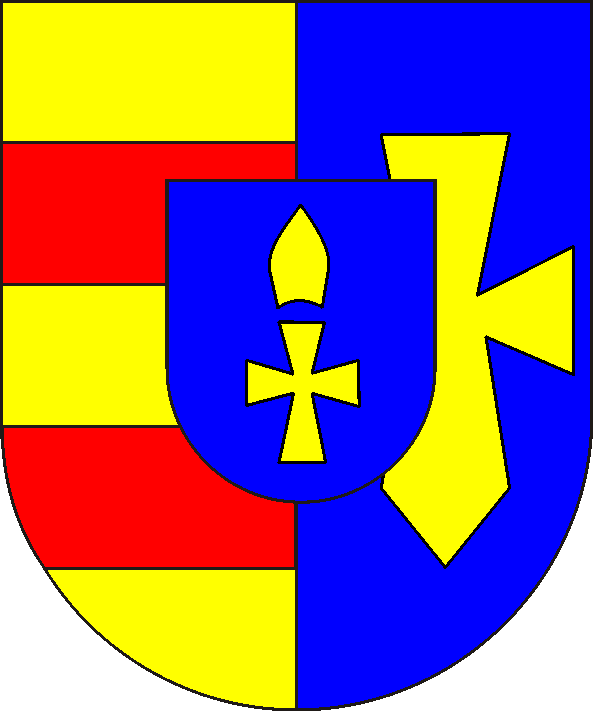
The coat-of-arms of the Principality of Lübeck as of 1829

Between 1810 and 1814 the principality was annexed to France as part of the Département des Bouches de l'Elbe, before it was restituted to the Duchy of Oldenburg. The Duchy of Oldenburg, named after its capital Oldenburg in Oldenburg, thus shared its name with the town of Oldenburg in Holstein, the original seat of the Bishopric, only by coincidence.

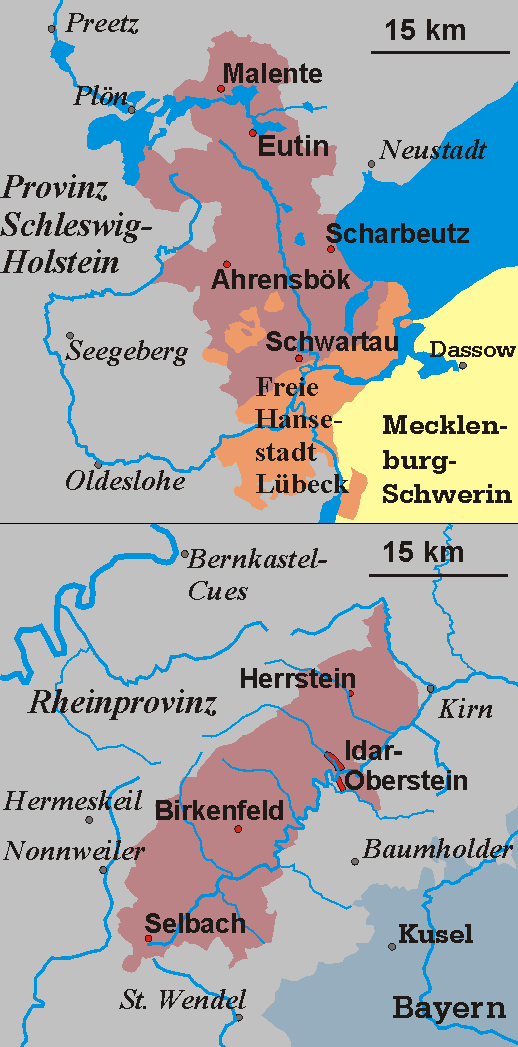
The Oldenburgian exclaves: the Principality of Lübeck as of 1868 (top) and the Principality of Birkenfeld (bottom).

Following the Austro-Prussian War in 1867 the principality was enlarged by the prior Holsteinian bailiwick of Ahrensbök, as a compensation for hereditary claims of the ducal House of Oldenburg to Holstein. After Oldenburg became a republic in 1918 the area remained an exclave of the Free State of Oldenburg now named Region of Lübeck (German: Landesteil Lübeck).

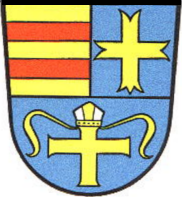
Coat-of-arms of the District of Eutin

In 1937 the region was incorporated into the Prussian Province of Schleswig-Holstein by a territorial redeployment according to the Greater Hamburg Act. The Region of Lübeck then became the District of Eutin, which was merged with the neighbouring District of Oldenburg in Holstein in the new district of Eastern Holstein in 1970.

The Lutheran Church, since the Protestant Reformation comprising the majority of the inhabitants, remained a separate entity, named Evangelical Lutheran State Church of the Oldenburgian Region of Lübeck (German: Evangelisch-Lutherische Landeskirche des oldenburgischen Landesteils Lübeck, chaired by a land provost or bishop in Eutin) until it merged with neighbouring Landeskirchen in the new North Elbian Evangelical Lutheran Church in 1977.

== Geography ==
The state had an area of 541 km^{2} (209 sq mi); as the imperial city of Lübeck was not incorporated, its only city was Eutin.
